= Victoria Vesna =

American digital media artist

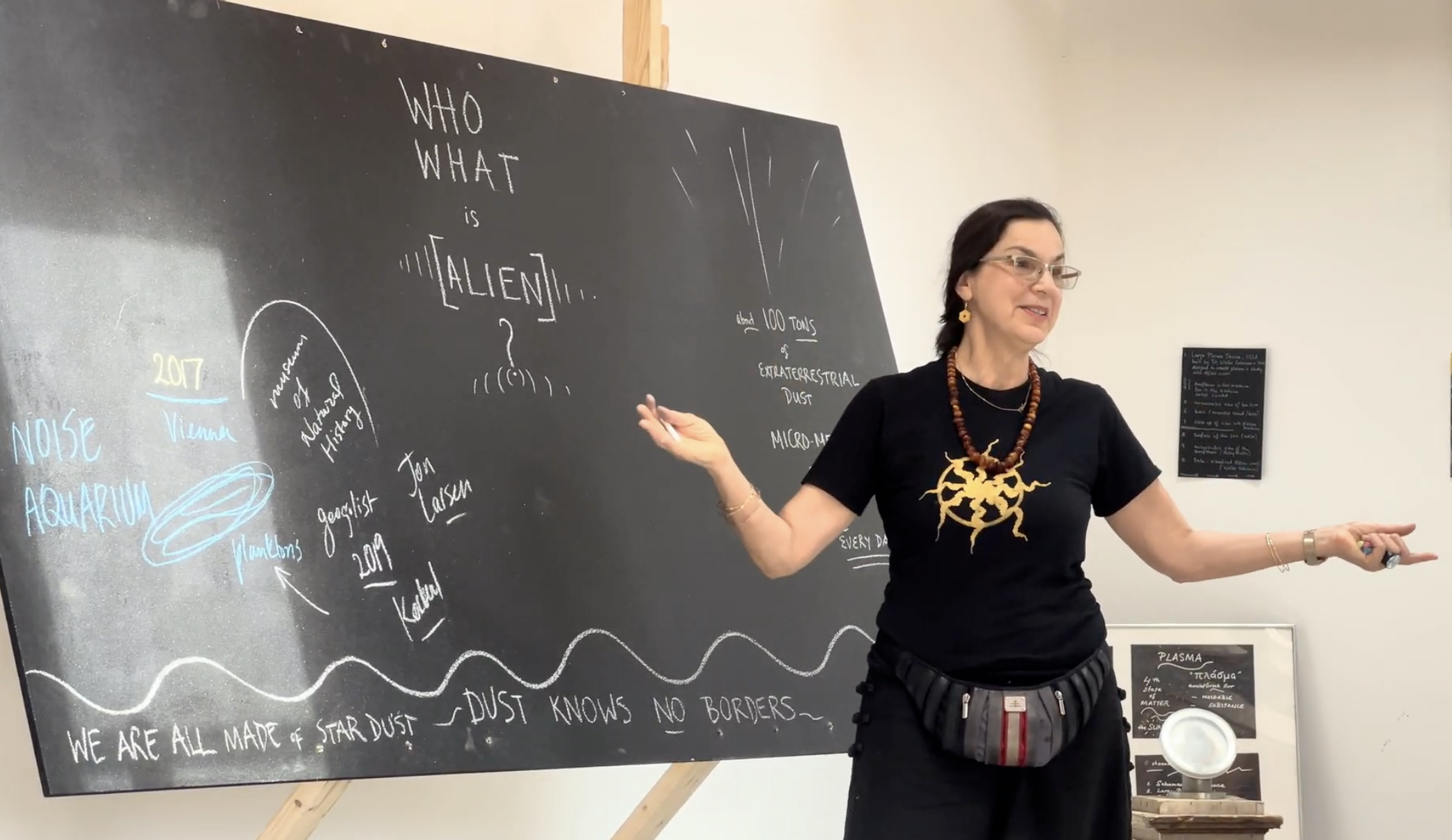
- Victoria Vesna giving a performative lecture [SUN]Flower Plasma at Birdsong gallery, Hamden, NY, 2025. Photo: John Halpern
- Born: June 9, 1959 (age 66); Washington D.C.
- Education: University of Wales and University of Belgrade
- Known for: nanoart, digital art, computer art, video art
- Notable work: Bodies INC (1997), NanoMandala (2003), Blue Morph (2008), Noise Aquarium (2017), [Alien] Star Dust: signal to noise (2020)
- Awards: Oscar Signorini Prize, CINE Golden Eagle
- Website: https://victoriavesna.com/

Victoria Vesna (born 1959) is a digital media artist, theorist, and professor whose work investigates the interplay between art, science, technology, and consciousness. She is widely recognized as a pioneer of early Internet art: her projects Virtual Concrete (1993) and Bodies INC (1997) were among the first to use the web as a participatory, social, and performative environment, exploring virtual identity, collective authorship, and embodied presence online.

Since the early 80s, Vesna has developed large-scale installations and long-term collaborations with scientists—including nanoscientists, plasma physicists, biologists, and neuroscientists—resulting in influential works such as NanoMandala, Zero@WaveFunction, Blue Morph, Noise Aquarium, Alien Star Dust, and [SUN]Flower Plasma.

== Early life and education ==
Victoria Vesna was born in Washington, D.C., on June 9, 1959. She graduated from the High School of Art & Design in New York City, New York, in 1976. She received a Fine Arts Diploma from the University of Belgrade, Yugoslavia in 1984. In 2000, she completed her Ph.D. under the mentorship of Roy Ascott, a pioneer of telematic and interactive art, at CAiiA (The Centre for Advanced Studies in Interactive Arts) at the University of Wales with a thesis entitled "Networked Public Spaces: An Investigation into Virtual Embodiment" in 2000.

In her early years in New York City, Vesna formed the post-punk band Crazy Hearts, immersing herself in the city’s 1980s industrial sound art and experimental post-punk movement, which later influenced her interest in sound as a performative and collaborative medium.

== Career ==
=== Teaching ===
Victoria Vesna was as the chair of the Department of Design | Media Arts at the UCLA School of the Arts and Architecture from 2000-2007. She previously held teaching positions at the University of Linz, University of Tsukuba, Parsons School of Design, and UC Santa Barbara. She is the founder and director of UCLA's Art|Sci Center since 2005. Through the UCLA School of the Arts and Architecture’s Design Media Arts Department and the California NanoSystems Institute (CNSI), the center supports visiting research scholars and artists-in-residence from around the world. Through various lectures, mixers, and symposia, artists and scientists are brought together in order to mesh these cultures and inspire individuals to think about art and science as interrelated and a very relevant synergism of society. The Art|Sci Center also hosts the Sci|Art NanoLab Summer Institute for high school students, introducing them to the vast possibilities in the field of art|science for the present and future generations. Art|Sci Center is home to the Art|Sci Collective, an international group of researchers and creatives that develops projects, workshops, performances, and exhibitions that address social, ethical, and environmental issues related to scientific innovations. Among the projects she hosts as the Art|Sci Center Director are 'the art & science dialogue series' Vibrations Matter and lecture series 'Color, Light, Motion' Color, Light, Motion.

== Awards and honors ==
She received the Oscar Signorini award for best net artwork in 1998 and the CINE Golden Eagle award for best scientific documentary in 1986. In 2011, she received the National Science Foundation Grant for their project, Acoustic Sensor Arrays for Understanding Bird Communication, with collaborators Charles Taylor and Takashi Ikegami. She also received the Pacific Standard Time (PST) Art X Science Grant "Atmosphere of Sound: sonic arts in times of climate disruption" (2020–25) from the Getty Foundation and Burroughs Wellcome (2024–25) for FEAST Fostering Ecocentric Art Science Together Boroughs Wellcome Fund.

In 2026, Victoria Vesna received the Distinguished Teaching of Art Award from the College Art Association, presented at its 114th Annual Conference in Chicago. The award is part of the CAA Awards for Distinction, which are announced annually during the conference’s Convocation to recognize outstanding achievements in visual arts and art scholarship.

=== Artwork ===
Through creative research, she examines perception and identity shifts in connection with scientific innovation as well as examining bio and nanotechnology through art.

Exhibitions include Spaceship Earth at the Centre of Contemporary Art Znaki Czasu in Toruń (2011) and MORPHONANO at the Beall Center for Art and Technology, Irvine, California (2012).

Artweek reviewer Claudine Isé writes, “Vesna has created a number of Web-based works that examine the dichotomy between concepts of “virtual’ and ‘concrete.’ Her on-line projects include an upcoming electronic conference about the cultural production of death as well as a popular site called Bodies INCorporated, which gives visitors an opportunity to design their own ‘cyber bodies’ from a selection of organic and synthetic textures, such as water, lava, chocolate, rubber or plastic.”

Sound and vibration is central in Vesna's practice, as Claire Farago, the art historian, writes: "it’s more than sound – it’s also vibration and frequency. And not just any vibration, but the hum of the universe. In an interview with art historian Dobrila Denegri, Vesna describes the long term collaborative nature of her work which brings the art and science world together.

=== Early Work ===
Victoria Vesna produced and directed "Stephen Hawking: Life in the Universe CD," an interactive CM-ROM software program, for MetaTools (1996). Based on an essay by Stephen Hawking, the software combined animations, data visualizations, and interactive elements to explore cosmology, particle physics, black holes, and the possibility of life beyond Earth.

=== Author ===
In Christopher Hanson's review of her book Database Aesthetics: Art in the age of information overflow, he says that Vesna provides an engaging collection of essays about changing aesthetics in interactive art and its relationship to the database.

Vesna is the North American Editor for AI & Society journal (Springer Verlag, UK), and on the advisory board of Technoetic Arts: A Journal of Speculative Research (Intellect, UK).

== Personal life ==
Victoria Vesna was married to nuclear physicist Bogdan Maglich, with whom she has two children. During this period, she collaborated with Maglich on the documentary Searching for Hidden Chambers Using Modern Physics, which received a CINE Golden Eagle Award and marked the beginning of her sustained engagement with art and science.

From 2003 to 2023, Vesna was in a long-term partnership with nanoscientist James Gimzewski, a co-founder of the UCLA Art|Sci Center and longstanding collaborator on projects developed at the California NanoSystems Institute (CNSI) and the UCLA Broad Art Center. Their partnership significantly shaped her early art–science installations, including NanoMandala, Zero@WaveFunction, and Blue Morph.

== Works ==
- [SUN]Flower Plasma (since 2024) in collaboration with plasma physicist Walter Gekelman and biomedical engineer Haley Marks.
- [ALIEN] Star Dust (since 2019)
- Noise Aquarium (since 2016), in collaboration with the Science Visualization Lab of the University of Applied Arts Vienna, documentary film maker Alfred Vendl, computer animator Martina R. Fröschl, biologists Stephan Handschuh and Thomas Schwaha, and programmer Glenn Bristol.
- Octopus Brainstorming (since 2015), in collaboration with neuroscientist Mark Cohen.
- Octopus Mandala Glow (2013), in collaboration with Ray Zimmerman, Dawn Faelnar, Mike Datz, Peter Rand, Steven Amrhein, and others
- Bird Song Diamond (2012), in collaboration with biologist Charles Taylor and physicist Takashi Ikegami
- HOX Zodiac (since 2009), in collaboration with neuroscientist Siddharth Ramakrishnan
- Blue Morph (since 2007), in collaboration with James Gimzewski
- Water Bowls (2006)
- Water Bodies (2006)
- Mood Swings (2005-2007)
- Datamining Bodies (2004), in collaboration with Gerald de Jong and David Beaudry
- Nanomandala (2003)
- NANO (2004), in collaboration with nanoscientist James Gimzewski
- Quantum Tunneling (2003-2008)
- Zero@wavefunction (2002) in collaboration with James Gimzewski
- Cell Ghosts (2001)
- n0Time (2001)
- Datamining Bodies (2000)
- Virtual Concrete (1995)
- Rambona (1995)
- Bodies© INCorporated (1993)
- Another Day in Paradise (1992)
- Sometimes a Cigar is Only a Cigar (1990)
- Vesper's Stampede to my Holy Mouth (1988)

== Publications ==
- Atmosphere of Sound: Sonic Arts in Times of Climate Disruption, co-authored with Anuradha Vikram, Pacific Standard Time: Art + Science Collide, Getty Foundation. 2024.
- Towards a Non-Anthropocentric Ecology: VICTORIA VESNA and Art in the World of Anthropocene, Kluszczynski, Ryszard, W. Ed., Lodz University press. 2020.
- Context Providers: Conditions of Meaning in Digital Arts. Co-edited with Margot Lovejoy and Christiane Paul. Intellect. 2011.
- Blue Morph: Metaphor and Metamorphosis, MM ’10: ACM Multimedia Conference Proceedings. 2010.
- Metamorphosis of the Human Animal: Hox Zodiac. Co-authored with Siddharth Ramakrishnan. 2010.
- Toward a Third Culture: Being In Between: Art and Electronic Media, Phaidon Press. 2008.
- Database Aesthetics: Art in the age of information overflow, University Of Minnesota Press. 2007.

== Exhibitions ==
=== Solo exhibitions ===
- [Sun]Flower Plasma: Harvestworks, New York, NY. (2025)
- [ALIEN] Star Dust: signal to noise: Natural History Museum, Vienna, Austria. (2020)
- Noise Aquarium: Ars Electronica, Linz, Austria. (2018)
- Bird Song Diamond: Times Square Alliance, New York, NY. (2015)
- MORPHONANO: Beall Center for Art and Technology, Irvine, California. (2012)
- Spaceship Earth: Centre of Contemporary Art Znaki Czasu in Torun, Poland. (2011)
- Quantum Tunneling: Median Kunst Labor (Media Art Laboratory), Graz, Austria. (2008)
- Cell Ghosts: Apeejay Media Gallery, New Delhi. (2005)
- NANO: Los Angeles County Museum of Art, Los Angeles, CA. (2003)
- Zero@wavefunction: Biennale for Electronic Arts, Perth. John Curtin University of Technology, Perth, Australia. (2002)
- Bodies INCorporated: San Francisco Art Institute, San Francisco, CA. (1997)

=== Group exhibitions ===
- Our Time on Earth: Peabody Essex Museum, Salem, MA, organized by the Barbican, UK. (2024)
- A Future of Possibilities: Cairotronica Festival, Cairo, Egypt. (2018)
- Post-humanist Desire: Museum of Contemporary Art, Taipei, Taiwan. (2013)
- Microwave International New Media Arts Festival, Hong Kong. (2011)
- Telematic Connections: the Virtual Embrace, San Francisco Art Institute, San Francisco, CA. (2001)
- Vesper's Stampede to my Holy Mouth; Cinescope with Carolee Schneemann: Museum of Modern Art, New York, NY. (1992)
- Red Angel, Installation. Art & Science, Aperto '86, Venice Biennale, Italy. (1986)
