= LAPD (disambiguation) =

LAPD commonly refers to the Los Angeles Police Department.

LAPD may also refer to:

- L.A.P.D. (band), an American heavy metal band
- The Large Plasma Device a plasma physics research machine at UCLA
- "L.A.P.D." (The Offspring), a song by The Offspring
- LAPD: Life on the Beat, a reality television show
- Future Cop: LAPD, a Sony PlayStation video game
- Los Angeles Poverty Department, a Skid Row neighborhood performance group
- LAPD, an Irish folk supergroup featuring Liam O'Flynn, Andy Irvine, Paddy Glackin and Dónal Lunny
