= Giovanni Valentini (artist) =

Italian artist (born 1939)

Giovanni Valentini (born 1939 in Galatina) is an Italian artist who has been part of the main international avant-garde since 1968. He was the first artist using the term cyborg, coined in the early 60s by two American scientists.

== Training ==
He began his studies into the cities of Lecce, Naples, Rome and Milan. In 1959 he formed friendship with Lucio Fontana and went often to his studio; that year he also met his friend Gianni Colombo. Around the 60s he formed friendship with Silvio Ceccato and first met Roberto Sanesi and Bruno Munari, who are stroke by his innovative ideas and they convinced him to move to Milan. In the same years he started a good relationship with Pedro Fiori and Domenico Cara.

== Beginnings ==
In the later years he met Giulio Carlo Argan, Carmelo Strano, Luciano Inga Pin and Pierre Restany, who esteemed his work and who invited him to participate to the 10th anniversary of Nouveau Réalisme in 1970, in Milan. For the event Valentini realized a work in honour of Yves Klein.

He made scientific and interdisciplinary studies knowing several scientists, among whom the astrophysicist Cesare Guaita and Silvio Ceccato. He collaborated with research institutes and universities, such as the University of Pavia. He associated to biology and studies of organic matter the interest for telematics, information technology, cybernetics and astrophysics. He used for the first time various techniques whose name would be today nanoart, such as in the work “Cristalli, stomi e cellule epidermali di stilo” (1978), or in other works made with cells cultures in vitro, or in any experiments touching the boundaries of science. In his various exhibitions in Italy and abroad Giovanni Valentini follows a route where art works with microscope and telescope to reveal matter’s facets, the complexity of life and her various shapes.

Valentini also used programming language to realize images showing stars, planets and astronomical phenomena's scenery. In 1964 and 1966 he showed his works in personal exhibitions at the Montenapoleone art gallery in Milan, then in 1967 at the Rizzato-Whitworth-Diagramma art gallery of Luciano Inga Pin and finally at the Italian newspaper Il Giorno art gallery.

Giovanni Valentini won the San Fedele prize in 1971 and then he held an exhibition on suspended animation, with nitrogen freezers containing animals placed in suspended animation, and radars which detect visitors movement. Again in 1971 he held a personal exhibition at the Apollinaire art gallery of Guido Le Noci, in Milan, and at the Obelisco art gallery, in Rome.

== Sources ==
- Vero Pizzigoni, Enciclopedia universale SEDA dell'arte moderna, 1971, IDAF
- Aldo Calò, Ab Origine - presenze pugliesi nell’arte contemporanea, 1983, Laterza
- Giorgio Genova, Storia dell’Arte Italiana del Novecento per Generazioni, 1990, Bora
- Ugo Gelli, Dolmen e Menhir in Terra d'Otranto, 2000, Congedo Editore
- Enciclopedia dell’Arte Zanichelli, 2004, Zanichelli
- Autori vari, Cyborg Astrophysics by Giovanni Valentini 57/98, 2010, D'Ars, Eupalino
