= Errol Damelin =

South African businessman

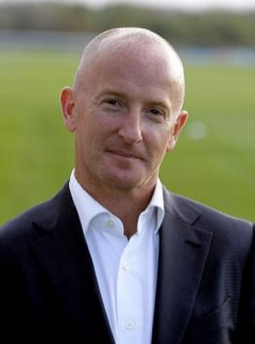
- Damelin in 2016.
- Born: Errol Damelin; 23 August 1969 (age 57); South Africa
- Education: University of Cape Town; Boston University
- Occupations: Entrepreneur and early-stage technology investor
- Known for: Founding Wonga.com
- Children: 3
- Website: ErrolDamelin.net

Errol Damelin (born 23 August 1969) is a South African entrepreneur and early-stage technology investor. In 2007 he co-founded Wonga, an internet payday loan company that gained notoriety for charging extremely high interest on short-term loans. After Damelin stepped down as CEO of the company in 2013, the company went into administration on 30 August 2018.

== Biography ==
Errol Damelin was born in South Africa on 23 August 1969. Damelin grew up in a Jewish family in Klerksdorp, South Africa, with his father being an anaesthesiologist. Upon graduating from high school Damelin attended the University of Cape Town. He was politically active at the university, winning an election to the UCT Students Representative Council and participating in anti-apartheid rallies. During this time he was detained for protesting against the apartheid government policy of detention without trial. He graduated from the University of Cape Town in 1995, before eventually getting an MBA at Boston University in Boston, United States. Damelin subsequently emigrated to Israel, where he began working as a corporate finance banker at an Israeli investment bank. In 1997 he left his job to help found Barzelan, a producer of speciality steel wire based in Beit Shemesh, Israel. In 2000 Damelin founded Supply Chain Connect, a cloud based supply chain software company. Based in London, United Kingdom, the company developed software for the supply chains of companies, including Dow Chemicals, DuPont, Phelps Dodge, General Cable, Mondi Packaging, and Corning. In 2005 Damelin sold the business to ChemConnect for an undisclosed amount.

In 2007 Damelin and Jonty Hurwitz launched Wonga.com, a payday loan website that provided short-term loans to borrowers in the United Kingdom and abroad. Despite initial skepticism from banks, Wonga processed one hundred thousand loans within two years and lowered its initial 50% default rate significantly. By 2013 the company had grown to over five hundred employees, with revenues of £300 million. That year it also acquired the Germany-based BillPay and launched Everline, a provider of loans for small and medium-sized businesses. In November 2013 Damelin stepped down as CEO of the company due to its declining profits and allegations that it was exploiting the most vulnerable in society. Several weeks later, Wonga was required by the Financial Conduct Authority to offer about £2.6 million in compensation to customers for poor historic debt collection practices, which had included the sending of fake solicitor letters to its customers. Several months prior, Damelin had called for better regulation of the consumer lending sector and more transparency in the wider financial services industry of the United Kingdom. When asked about Wonga's controversial lending practices after his resignation, Damelin said that he had no moral issues with them, claiming that credit could be an important force for good when given transparently and fairly and that Wonga's customers were overwhelmingly happy with and supportive of the company. After an increase in customer compensation claims, Wonga went into administration on 30 August 2018.

== Personal life ==
Damelin lives in London and has three children.

== Awards ==
Damelin has received several entrepreneurial awards:

- 2008 – Credit Suisse Entrepreneur of the year at the National Business Awards, South East
- 2009 – Ruban d’Honneur in the RSM International Entrepreneur of the Year category of the European Business Awards
- 2010 – Digital Entrepreneur of the Year (Digital Entrepreneur Awards)
- 2010 – Entrepreneur of the Year (Growing Business Awards)
- 2010 – Founder of the Year (Tech Crunch – The Europa's)
- 2011 – Ernst & Young Entrepreneur of the Year
- 2011 – The Guardian's Digital Entrepreneur of the Year
- 2012 – Founder of the Year (Founders Forum)

== Philanthropy ==
Damelin has donated to Jewish charities and has appeared on panels and discussions for World Jewish Relief and Jewish Care. Damelin has also been an ambassador for Charity: Water and ran the Antarctic Ice marathon, where he raised substantial funds for the charity. In 2015 Damelin became a founding member of Founders Pledge, a group of technology entrepreneurs who pledged 2% of the equity in their companies to philanthropic causes.
