= Kevin Krautgartner =

German architectural and landscape photographer

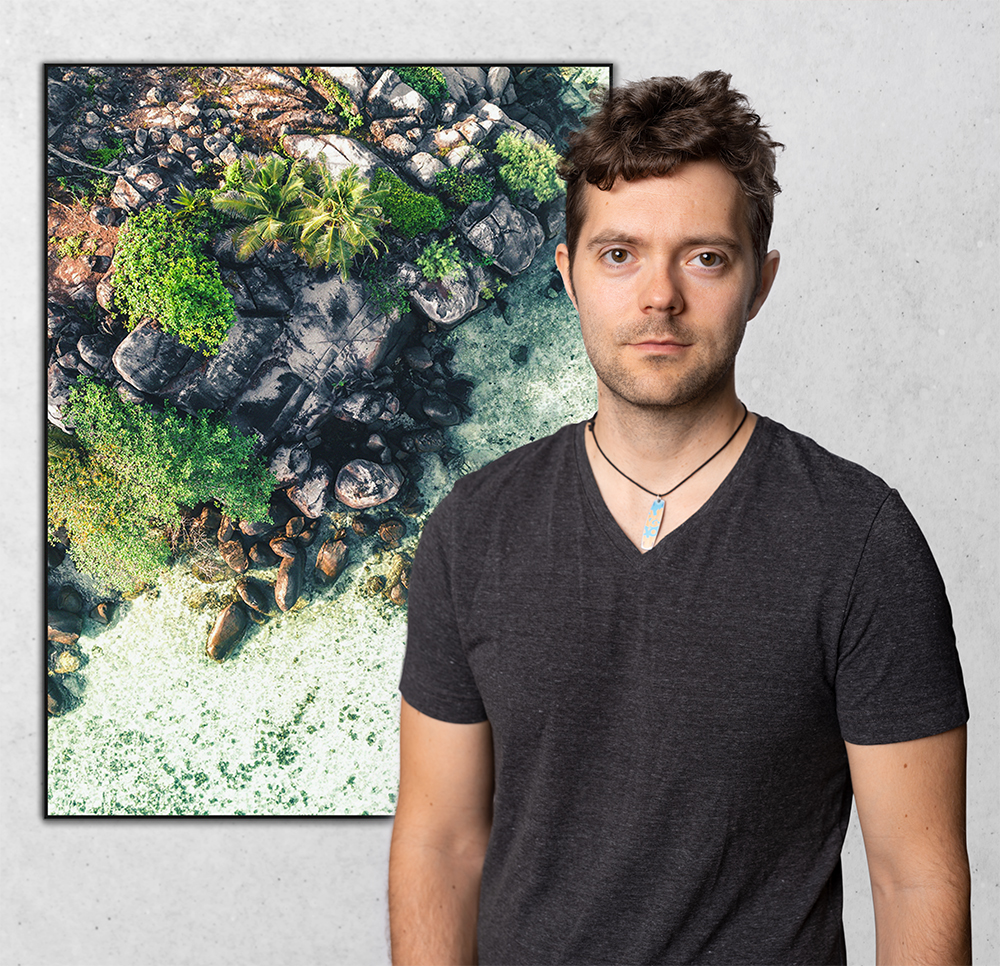
Kevin Krautgartner next to a photograph from Endangered Paradises

Kevin Krautgartner (born 1988) is a German architectural and landscape photographer, best known for his aerial images of urban and large ground spaces highlighting the aesthetic value of colors, lines and geometric patterns in them. His oeuvre has been awarded at international contests, and featured in mainstream media.

== Life and work ==
Krautgartner was born in 1988 in Schwelm, Germany and currently lives and works in Wuppertal.

He graduated from the Dortmund University of Applied Sciences and Arts with a degree in photography and graphic design. Digital photography is the basis for his work today. He uses helicopters and light planes to capture his objects -architectural interiors, urban skylines, remote landscapes- from different perspectives which he later uses to digitally select and frame aesthetically appealing views. His landscapes include icy mountains, volcanoes, glaciers, fjords and salt fields in many countries.

Krautgartner's work has been used in NatGeo, Der Spiegel, Colossal, The Mirror, Novosti, FAZ, Die Welt and WDR, and Yahoo! News, which annotated his images as being evocative of abstract masterpieces.

== Exhibitions ==
- 2021 Exhibition at South Australian Museum, Adelaide, Australia
- 2022 Exhibition at Christopher Martin Gallery, Dallas TX, USA
- 2022 Exhibition at VINTA Series Showroom, Hamburg, Germany

== Awards ==
- 2014 Winner of the EISA MAESTRO Audience Award
- 2016 Wuppertaler-Photoaward
- 2018 Epson Pano Awards / Highest Scoring Aerial Image
- 2019 Fine Art Photography Awards, Gold in Travel for his series The Long Journey
- 2019 CIWEM Environmental Photographer of the Year, shortlisted for Colors of the Salt
- 2019 One Eyeland Fine Art Photo Award: a)International, Silver and Bronze prizes in Architecture, Silver and Bronze in Abstract; National: Germany Top Rank
- 2019 101 International Landscape Photographer of the year for River Delta, Iceland
- 2019 Lynx International Award, First Prize in Photography
- 2019 Young Guns 17 Award in Photography
- 2019 Epson International Pano Award, Fourth place Gold, in Built Environment/Architecture for Office Space No. 6
- 2019/2020 Fine Art Photography Award, 1st Place Winner in Nature for River Flame (single)
- 2020 Moscow International Photography Award, Gold in Nature/Aerial for Traces of Water
- 2020 ADC International Award, in Drone / Aerial /Series for Face of Bauxite Mining – Source of Our Aluminium
- 2020 Vienna International Photo Award, winners shortlist
- 2020 Andrei Stenin Award, winners shortlist
- 2020 PX3 - Prix de la Photographie, "Gold" Winner
- 2021 TIFA Awards, Gold Award
- 2022 The Independent Photographer: Landscape Award

== Publications ==
- Baumann, André Alexander; Hulsch, Johannes; Krautgartner, Kevin; Krebs, Julius; Sperner, Sebastian; Schauer, Michael (2019). Fotografieren mit Drohnen (in German). Bonn: Galileo Press. ISBN 978-3-8362-6750-2. OCLC 1079589844.
- Krautgartner, Kevin; Werner, Florian (2021). Wasser.Farben Wie Wasser unsere Welt formt (in German). München: von dem Knesebeck GmbH & Co. Verlag KG. ISBN 978-3-95728-427-3. OCLC 1248719226. "A nature picture book documenting water in all its facets, with its accompanying resources of life, colors and fragile beauty"
