= Daily tous les jours =

Canadian art and design studio

- Company type: Private
- Founded: 2010
- Headquarters: Montreal, Quebec, Canada
- Key people: Mouna Andraos, Melissa Mongiat
- Products: Public Art, Interactive design
- Number of employees: 20
- Website: https://www.dailytouslesjours.com/en

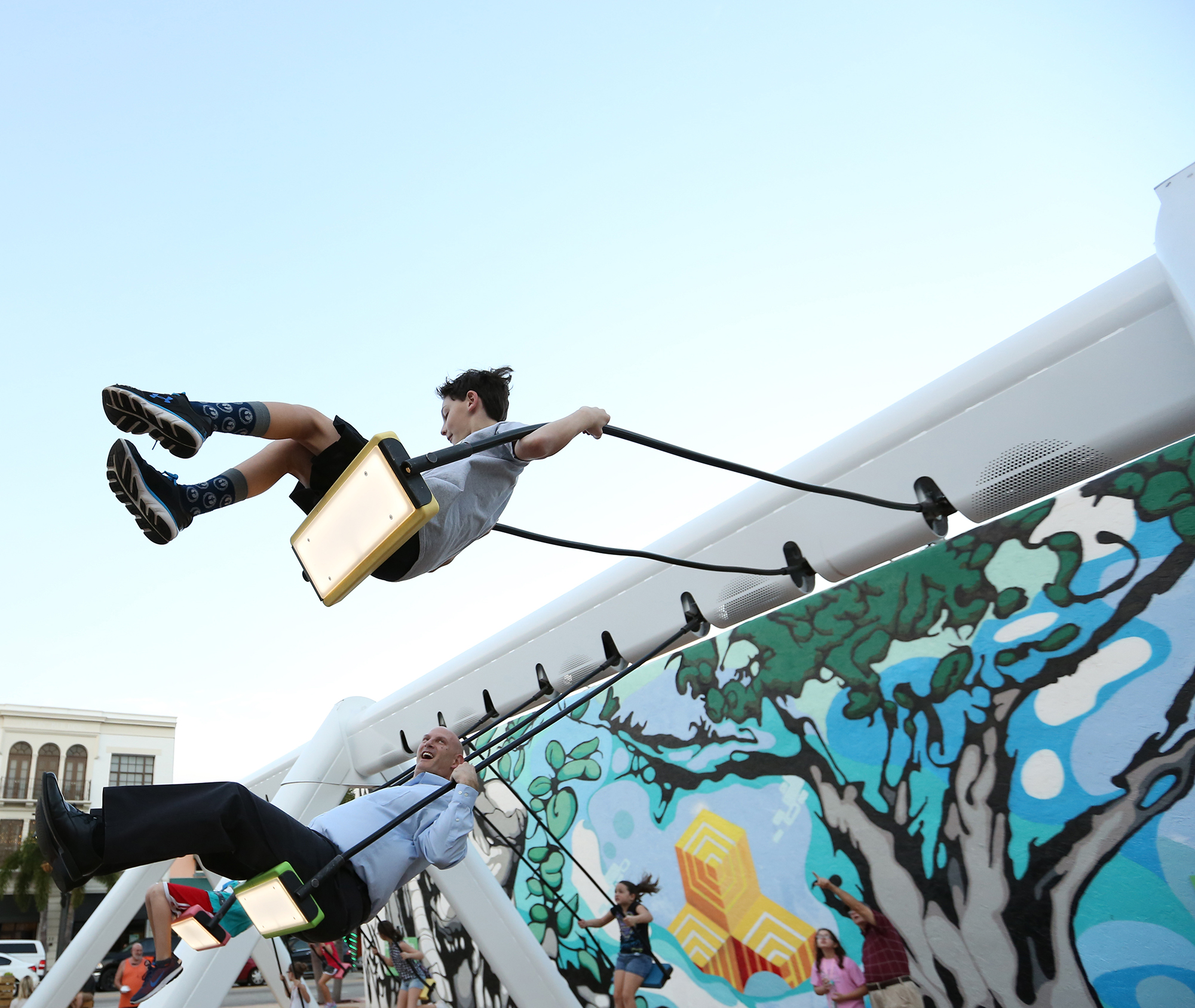

Daily tous les jours is a Canadian company specializing in the design of interactive installations and immersive public experiences. Founded in 2010 by Mouna Andraos and Melissa Mongiat, Daily tous les jours is based in Montreal, Quebec. The company is recognized for its innovative work in art, technology, and urban design, and has completed turnkey original projects in over 40 cities around the world. Daily's interventions in public spaces invite humans to play an essential role in transforming their environment, contributing to the construction of more resilient cities.

== History ==
Daily tous les jours was founded in 2010 by Mouna Andraos and Melissa Mongiat. The company's initial goal was to create innovative public projects, combining the fields of art, design, and technology to encourage citizen participation and collaboration.

== Types of Projects ==
Daily tous les jours creates various types of artistic interventions and public experiences, with a focus on inclusive and participatory approaches.

=== Permanent and Temporary Installations ===
Daily's permanent and temporary installations aim to generate meaningful collective experiences and promote positive change. Temporary works evoke a sense of infinite possibilities for improving interactions between individuals. Daily's catalog offers works suitable for various site sizes, uses, and environmental conditions.

=== Public Art ===
Daily's interventions in public spaces bring works of art to life through citizen participation. Using light, music, and movement, they enchant everyday life.

=== Urban Design & Public Realm ===
Over the years, Daily has expanded the impact of its work by developing strategies and tactics for entire neighborhoods or cities.

=== Visitor Experience ===
Daily designs and programs participatory spaces that tell stories, both indoors and outdoors. Pop-up store for tech company LittleBits won a Fast Company Innovation x Design Award.

=== Community engagement ===
Daily tous les jours emphasizes community engagement, creating work that is relevant and integrated within a community. Their practice involves learning and co-creating with stakeholders, fostering a sense of ownership and pride among the people who interact with their installations. The studio aims to build meaningful connections and open dialogues with diverse audiences, promoting social cohesion. By combining art, technology, and social interaction, they create transformative experiences that empower communities and inspire positive change.

== Notable projects ==
Daily tous les jours has completed several iconic projects around the world, including:

=== Musical Swings Series ===
==== 21 Balançoires (21 Swings) ====
The 21 Swings project is one of Daily tous les jours' most talked about projects. It consists of a set of 21 musical swings installed in a public space in Montreal. When people swing on these swings, they create music together, creating a social and interactive experience. The project was quickly adopted by Montrealers and tourists alike. People raved about how wonderful it is to make music with their entire body. The first edition of the Musical Swings has received numerous awards and distinctions, including the Best in Show from the Interaction Design Association (IxDA), the Grand Prize at the UNESCO Shenzhen Design Award in 2014. Influential media such as This is Colossal, Fast Company have acclaimed this interactive installation and even the famous Oprah Winfrey has called it a "living work of art".

Musical Swings, Touring Edition

Following the success of the 21 Swings in Montreal, Daily tous les jours created a touring version of the work for the Green Box Arts Festival in Green Mountain Falls, Colorado. The Musical Swings, Touring Edition have since visited New York, Detroit, West Palm Beach, Dhahran, Singapore, and other cities, enchanting public spaces with smiles and laughter.

In 2016, with support from the Knight Foundation, Daily tous les jours commissioned an independent study to analyze the social and economic impact of the Musical Swings in three American cities: West Palm Beach, Detroit, and San Jose.

The study revealed $4,498,000 in economic impact over a 19-week period, and a 293% return on investment. The study reports how collective experiences have the power to break down the social barriers that prevent us from interacting in public space. The cooperative nature of the installation transformed unusual and underused sites into thriving destinations that are welcoming for all.

1 out of 3 participants reported interacting with a stranger.

Over time, new urban habits were adopted by the public, creating a new sense of ownership over the shared space.

When asked about the Musical Swings, participants repeatedly testified to feeling renewed pride for their city. Participants used the words happy, therapeutic, calming, peaceful, awesome to describe the experience.

Musical Swings, Permanent Edition

The first permanent edition of the Musical Swings was installed in Lawrence in 2021, transforming the city once considered a stopover into a destination in its own right.

The work has become an extension of the living space of the residents, a dynamic place for exchanges, and a space for collective relaxation on a daily basis. Judy Byron, executive director of Arts for Lawrence, highlighted the impact of the Musical Swings on Lawrence's reputation, stating, "We wanted people to come here and stay (...) The Musical Swings are the star of the campus for engaging community members. Everyone is starting to talk about Lawrence to get there, not to transit, but to visit the Musical Swings."

=== Musical Pavement Series ===
Installed permanently in Dubai, Arizona, and recently in Budapest, this award-winning series of artworks invites passersby to explore how their movements trigger musical notes and how they can express themselves with their entire body in public space. The Musical Pavement series includes interactive light sensors and audio tiles triggered by movement or shadows.

==== Cimbalom Circle ====
Cimbalom Circle is an interactive installation located at the entrance to the Budapest House of Music. It invites passersby to collectively play a traditional musical instrument, the cimbalom, by walking on interactive paving. This project was ranked among the top 10 public space projects of 2022 by AZURE Magazine and won the Interaction Award 2022 from Core77.

==== Pearl Divers ====
Pearl Divers is a musical pavement installation that revives an ancient Emirati tradition. It won the Best in Optimizing award at the Interaction Design Awards (IxDA) and NUMIX awards in 2021.

=== Daydreamer ===
Daydreamer is a public space artwork that won the Best Artwork in Public Space award at Hub Montréal in 2022. It is a kinetic musical bench that invites people to stop and play with the installation while enjoying their surroundings. Several design magazines have featured the project such as Wallpaper, Design Milk, Monocle and Icon Eye Magazine.

=== Walk Walk Dance ===
Walk Walk Dance is a series of permanent and touring musical lines, adaptable to all paths and streets, facilitating their deployment in various urban contexts. Walk Walk Dance, a touring installation from this series, won the Grand Prize for International Outreach at Hub Montréal in 2021 and was recognized as notable at the Core77 Interaction Awards in 2021. It is also part of the COVID-19 Directory of Design Vanguard, highlighting its impact and success in the field of interactive design.

== Awards and distinctions ==
Best artwork in public space – Hub Montreal	Hub Montreal	Daydreamer	2022-10-01	
TOP10 – Public Space project – Azure	AZURE Magazine	Cimbalom Circle	2022-12-01	Link
Winner – Interaction Award – Core77	Core77	Cimbalom Circle	2022-03-01	Link
Winner – Mention Exportation – Numix Award	Prix Numix	Daily tous les jours	2022-03-01	Link
Best Optimizing – IxDA	Interaction Design Award (IxDA)	Pearl Divers	2021-03-01	Link
Winner – Experiential – Numix Award	Prix Numix	Pearl Divers	2021-03-01	Link –
Grand Prize – International Outreach – Hub Montreal – 2021	Hub Montreal	Walk Walk Dance, Touring Edition	2020-12-01	
Honoree – Interaction Award – Core77	Core77	Walk Walk Dance, Touring Edition	2021-03-01	Link
COVID-19 Directory – Design Vanguard	Design Vanguard	Walk Walk Dance, Touring Edition	2021-03-01	Link
Grand prix du design	INT DESIGN	Ici a été fondée Montréal	2019-01-21	
Americans Association for the Arts Award	Americans for the Arts	Musical Shadows	2017-03-01	Link
Knight Cities Challenge for Civic Innovation Winner	Knight Foundation	Musical Swings, Touring Edition	2015-03-01	Link
IxDA Best In Show, Best Engagement	Interaction Design Award (IxDA)	21 Swings (21 Balancoires)	2013-03-01	Link
Grand Prize – UNESCO Creative Cities Design Award	UNESCO Shenzhen Design Award	21 Swings (21 Balancoires)	2014-04-01	Link
Fast Company Innovation by Design Award	Fast Company	littleBits pop up	2016-12-01	Link
Bourse Phillys Lambert Design Montréal			2010-09-01	
