= Lorraine Loots =

South African artist and miniaturist

- Born: Bloemfontein, South Africa
- Education: Stellenbosch University (BA Visual Communications, 2010); University of Cape Town (MA Film and Media, 2011); UCT Graduate School of Business (Diploma in Business Acumen for Artists, 2012)
- Known for: 365 Paintings for Ants (2013); 365 Postcards for Ants (2014); 100 Paintings for Ants (2015); Miniature depictions of landscapes and everyday objects
- Notable work: Over 900 miniature paintings exhibited in London (2019)
- Style: Painting; Miniature art
- Movement: Contemporary miniature art

Lorraine Loots is a South African artist and miniaturist from Cape Town. She has created miniature depictions of circular landscapes and everyday objects on a white background. Lorraine first rose to notoriety during 2013 when she began a project called 365 Paintings for ants and later in 2014 with 365 Postcards for ants where she painted one painting every day of the year and posted it on social media platforms for two consecutive years. This project gained her much media attention where she was featured on CBS, CNN, Charlie Rose, Huffington Post and Colossal to name a few.

== Education ==
Loots initially studied art but dropped it as a subject in high school. She later completed a BA in Visual Communications at Stellenbosch University in 2008, graduating in 2010. In 2011, she earned an MA in Film and Media from the University of Cape Town. In 2012, she obtained a diploma in Business Acumen for Artists from the UCT Graduate School of Business.

== Career ==
Despite completing her art-related education, Loots initially chose not to pursue a career in art. However, in 2013, she launched the side project 365 Paintings for Ants, in which she painted a miniature artwork every day for a year, allowing people to "book" dates for personalised pieces. The project received significant international attention, leading her to continue with 365 Postcards for Ants in 2014 and 100 Paintings for Ants in 2015.

These series enabled Loots to hold international exhibitions in cities including New York, Los Angeles, Chicago, Hong Kong, Singapore, and Sydney. In June 2019, she presented her largest exhibition to date her first in London displaying over 900 miniature paintings created over the previous six years.

Loots' work, grounded in nostalgia, sentimentality, and attention to everyday details, has been featured in media outlets such as CNN, The Huffington Post, The Daily Mail, Colossal, Buzzfeed, and Gizmodo. As of August 2019, she had 292,000 followers on Instagram.
