= Daizy =

Artificial intelligence company

- Formerly: Vesti.AI
- Company type: Private
- Industry: Personal investment
- Founded: 2018
- Founder: Jonty Hurwitz
- Area served: Worldwide
- Key people: Deborah Yang (CEO)
- Website: daizy.com

Daizy is an artificial intelligence firm that conducts long-term research in the field of generative AI for investment transparency.

== History ==
Daizy was founded as Vesti.AI by Jonty Hurwitz in 2018. The company focuses on conversational AI and continues research in the field of generative AI with portfolio, crypto, and ETF analytics capabilities.

In 2020, Daizy was joined by its current CEO, Deborah Yang.

Yang and Hurwitz gathered their team of experts in the fields of risk analysis, sustainability, and artificial intelligence. The company’s AI research aims to release capabilities on an ongoing basis that help investors and financial advisors with actionable intelligence in fields such as sustainability (ESG) and risk.

== Awards ==
- WealthTech100 2025, annual list of 100 of the world’s most innovative WealthTech companies.
- Best AI-Enabled Financial Content Generation Company 2024 - FinTech Awards by Wealth & Finance International
- Most Innovative AI-Led Financial Analysis Tool 2024 - Wealth & Asset Management Awards by Wealth & Finance International
- Winner of the Best AI-Enabled Sustainable Investment Platform 2021.
