= Wonga.com =

British payday loan provider

Wonga Group Limited
- Trade name: Wonga.com
- Type: Private
- Industry: Technology finance
- Founded: 2006; 20 years ago
- Founders: Errol Damelin; Jonty Hurwitz
- Defunct: 2020; 6 years ago
- Fate: Administration
- Headquarters: London, United Kingdom
- Areas served: United Kingdom; Spain; Poland; South Africa
- Key people: Tara Kneafsey (CEO); Grant Thornton (Administrators)
- Products: Payday loans
- Subsidiaries: BillPay (2013-2017)
- Website: www.wonga.com

Wonga.com, also known as Wonga, was a British payday loan firm that was founded in 2006. The company focused on offering short-term, high-cost loans to customers via online applications, and began processing its first loans in 2007. The firm operated across several countries, including the United Kingdom, Spain, Poland, and South Africa; it also operated in Canada until 2016, and in Germany, Switzerland, Austria, and the Netherlands through the German payments business, BillPay, between 2013 and 2017.

The company was responsible for inventing fully automated risk processing technology to provide short-term, unsecured personal loans online, including via tablet and mobile app. However, it also drew wide criticism for the interest it charged, equated to an annual percentage rate (APR) of 1,509%; an example of this was that a loan of £100 over seventeen days (Wonga's average loan term) required £113.60 to repay. The company was criticised heavily by politicians, including former Labour Party leader Ed Miliband as a leading example of predatory lending. The firm's debt collection practices were also scrutinised by the Financial Conduct Authority (FCA), who found the firm had lent money to many who would never be able to repay and Wonga agreed to compensate 45,000 customers for unfair and misleading debt collection practices.

By 2015, the company began to incur losses, which were further increased by discontinuation of sponsorship deals, a data breach in 2017, and a surge of customer compensation claims. Despite an emergency cash injection from shareholders to prevent it becoming insolvent, the firm fell into administration on 30 August 2018, with Grant Thornton appointed to wind down the business, sell assets and identify creditors. By March 2019, administrators noted that compensation claims against the firm increased, but with many claimants unlikely to receive the full value of their claim.

== History ==
=== Founding and growth ===
Wonga was co-founded by Errol Damelin and Jonty Hurwitz in October 2006, who derived the name from the Romany slang term for money that was in use in some parts of Britain since the 1980s. The plan for the company was to disrupt the short-term credit industry with a new branch of lender that provided transparency, exact control of amount and payment date, and immediate access to funds to customers, without hassling them through faxing or emailing documents. Although both men had previous experience in internet start-up operations, neither Damelin or Hurwitz had any within retail banking, which presented a problem when seeking out funding, as many potential investors they approached perceived the short-term, small-loans business as an unprofitable, risky backwater. After being denied funding by UK banks, Wonga secured venture capital through Balderton Capital.

The company's first year was spent on software development for a beta website. The business model of lending only to those who could pay back reliably, as opposed to the much wider catchment practice of payday loans, required an algorithm that could fully determine risk in an automated manner – something they had difficulty developing in the early stages. In addition, Damelin and Hurwitz required the co-operation of leading banks to help get funds directly to customers' bank accounts as quickly as possible, by convincing them that customer identity could be provided without physical documentation, a factor in their plan that banks were uncertain with. A beta website was eventually finalised and launched in 2007, and within five minutes, Wonga was processing its first loan application; within a week, the firm faced its first loan default. The subsequent months of operation showed increased demand, but traditional methods of credit risk assessment proved inadequate, leading the company to experience default rates of around 50%. During the first year of operations, the company used this period to gather data on customer behaviour in order to develop their own proprietary risk technology.

The full market launch of Wonga.com was officially made in July 2008, and within a year it had processed around 100,000 loans. Through the experience of processing these loans, the company developed technologies which began to dramatically reduce the percentage of defaults. In July 2009, Wonga raised a further £13.9m of funding in a Round B led by Accel Partners, Greylock Partners, and Dawn Capital. In 2009, the company was already profitable and default rates were below 10%, less than the average for credit cards. A third round of funding was completed in 2011, for £73m led by Oak Investment Partners, including additional investors Meritech Capital Partners and the Wellcome Trust. By the end of 2011, Wonga's technology could reliably reject two-thirds of applications and predict the ability of a customer to repay a loan by an accuracy of around 93%. In May 2012, the firm expanded into South Africa, offering consumer loans, and began testing their technology in November that year for a possible expansion into Canada.

By 2011, Wonga had started to make significant profits and in September 2012 it reported profits of £45.8m for 2011 from revenue of £185m, up from a profit of £12.4m in 2010.

=== Decline and collapse ===
On 30 September 2014, Wonga announced that its profits for the previous year had fallen by 53% to £39.7 million. The company blamed the cut in profits to "remediation costs" – compensation paid to customers – which in total cost the company £18.8m, and predicted its profitability would be reduced through new controls set out by the Financial Conduct Authority (FCA) from June of that year. Along with conforming to the new rules set out by the FCA, which limited roll-overs of loans and forced them to increase affordability checks, price caps were introduce from the start of 2015. The tougher regulations on the payday loan sector impacted the firm significantly, doubling its loss as its UK consumer base was greatly reduced; around almost 3.8 million of the 4 million loans it granted around that time were to UK customers. By the end of 2015, the company reported a pre-tax loss of £80.2m for the year – up from £38.1m the year before . In April 2017, Wonga suffered a data breach which affected around 245,000 of its customers in the UK. The range of information stolen in the breach included details on customers' bank cards – information used by some banks as part of the login process for online accounts.

On 4 August 2018, the company received an emergency £10m cash injection from shareholders after its chief executive warned it was in danger of becoming insolvent due to a surge in customer compensation claims. On 26 August, Grant Thornton were lined up to act as administrators in the event Wonga became insolvent, pending a decision to be made within weeks, and assumed these responsibilities the day after the firm went into administration on 30 August. Grant Thornton focused on conducting a wind-down of the business that would involve the sale of assets and identifying creditors, along with handling claims for compensation. By March 2019, the administrators informed the Treasury Select Committee that the number of claims had increased fourfold - increasing from around 10,500 to over 40,000 - since the firm's collapse, but that the lack of assets and the sheer volume meant that many claimants — denoted as unsecured creditors — were likely to receive much less than they were entitled to.

By January 2020, the number of claimants was 358,000. They shared around £23m in compensation, around 4.3% of what they were owed.

Wonga was dissolved on 19 December 2020.

== Ownership and corporate structure ==
Over 180 million shares of the company were owned by venture capital firms, around 77.1%. The balance of the company was owned by staff, board members and founders with Errol Damelin owning 26.5m shares through Castle Bridge Ventures, an offshore trust based in the British Virgin Islands, while Jonty Hurwitz owns 12.6m shares (around 5.5%) through a BVI company. Damelin resigned as Chief Executive in November 2013 to become part-time chairman and non-executive director. He resigned entirely as a Director in June 2014. Hurwitz resigned from the company in November 2011 and left the board of Wonga in November 2013.

=== CEOs ===
- December 2006 to November 2013 – Errol Damelin.
- November 2013 to May 2014 – Neil Wass.
- May 2014 to November 2014 – Tim Weller.
- November 2014 – Tara Kneafsey – Managing Director.

== Customer profile ==
Wonga claimed that its customers were "tech-savvy young professionals who previously used the banks to borrow money". It accepted that its APR was "not cheap" but claimed that its typical customer was someone on a mid-level salary temporarily short of cash because of an unexpected bill, for example to buy a new central heating boiler or tickets to a music festival.

Dr Gathergood of the University of Nottingham described payday loan users as falling into two groups, those who have had a financial shock but can repay the money and those who were unable to control their expenditure, though he said lenders preferentially associated their clients with the first group. A Parliamentary committee also looked at credit unions. Mark Lyonette of Association of British Credit Unions said that although credit unions now provided 90 million loans in the United States, they were not able to match the "sophisticated automation and credit scoring behind the scenes" of the "high-tech, payday-lending Wonga model", though he welcomed the possibility of using post offices as a vehicle to expand the Credit Union market in the UK.

Wonga said that most applicants were not credit-worthy enough to obtain a loan from the firm, but that it only lent to those with a good credit record. Some commentators, however, warned that taking a loan from a payday lender could damage the customer's credit record and their ability to obtain a mortgage, even where the loan was repaid years prior. Ray Boulger of John Charcol, for instance, told BBC Newsnight that "Our experience is that mortgage lenders will often turn down requests for people who have had a payday loan...", and Robert Sinclair, Chief Executive of the Association of Mortgage Intermediaries, said "From a consumer perspective, anybody who takes out a payday loan is clearly showing some financial distress and existing lenders will think these consumers may be maxed out."

== Defaults and renewal of loans ==
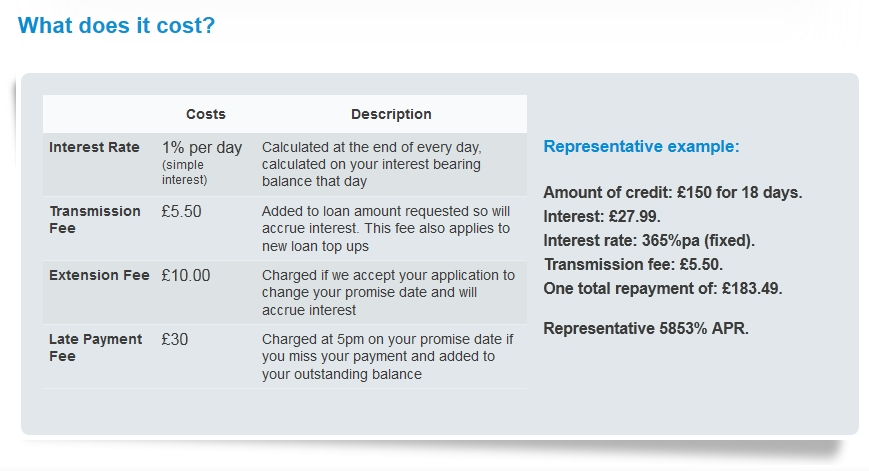
Screenshot from Wonga.com, 3 February 2014, showing the costs of a loan.

Wonga stated that if the money was not available on the day a customer has nominated to pay it back, a £30 fee would be charged and interest would accrue for a maximum of 60 days and that it did not allow automatic "rolling over" of loans, limiting to specific requests and to a maximum of three instances in accordance with the Finance and Leasing Association lending code.

On 28 November 2012, following concerns that small loans, intended to be short-term, could become prohibitively expensive, the government announced it would give the Financial Conduct Authority powers to prevent indefinite rolling over of loans and effectively limit charges.

In August 2018, the company announced that it would not be offering more loans because of the critical financial situation of the company. However, it decided to only entertain their existing clients.

== Sponsorship and public relations ==
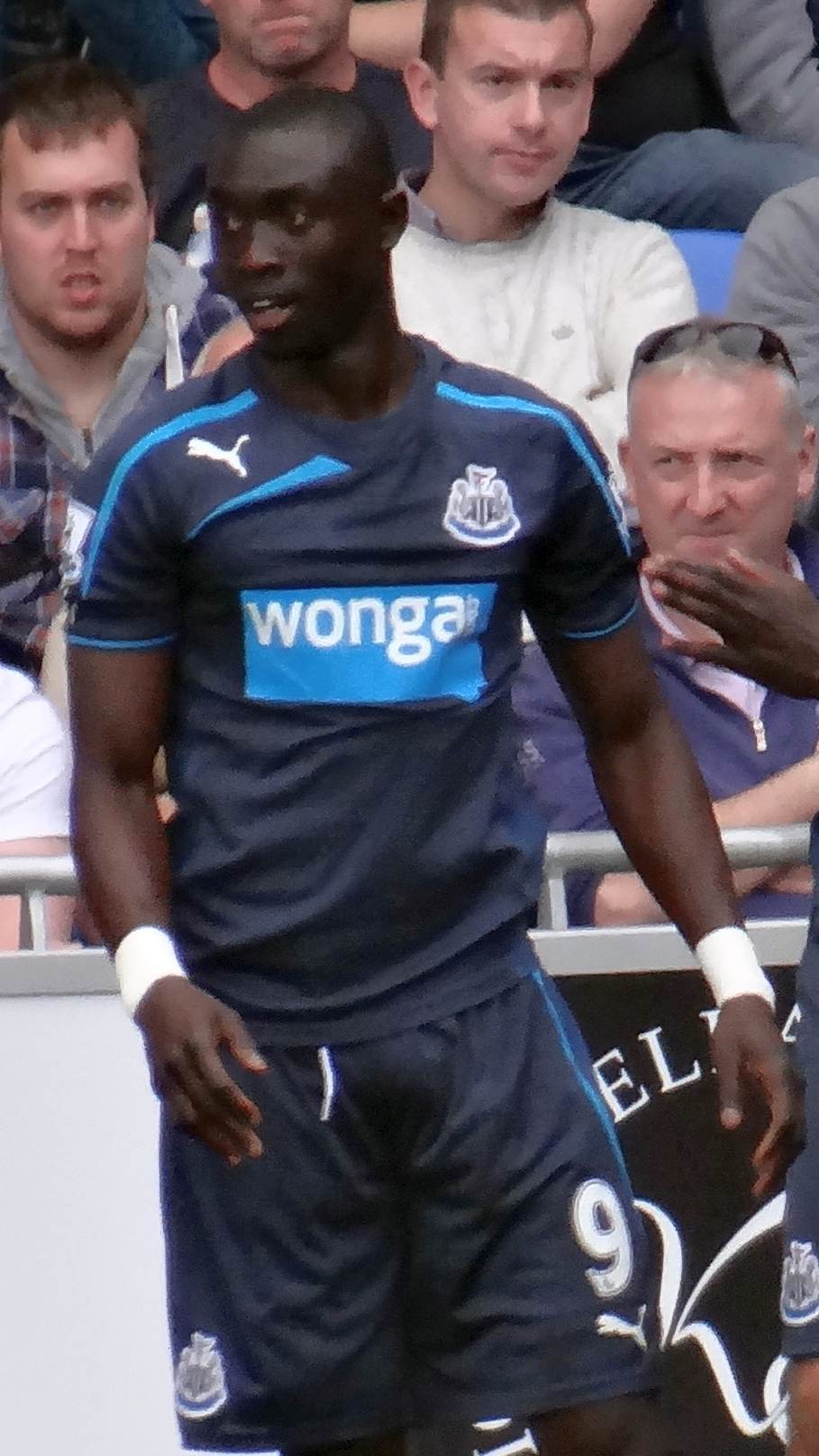
Footballer Papiss Cissé of Newcastle United in a Wonga sponsored shirt.

Wonga sponsored free travel on the London Underground on New Year's Eve in 2010, and posters were put up on the network advertising the website with the slogan "sometimes you need some extra cash". A member of the London Assembly said that it was 'shameful' that the Mayor of London, Boris Johnson, had allowed such sponsorship at a time of year when people are most vulnerable financially. Media Week noted that the deal was "highly criticised" and that Transport for London later banned payday loan companies from sponsoring their services.

In August 2012, the company launched OpenWonga, an online "digital platform that aims to 'inform the debate' around the brand".

In October 2012, Wonga announced that they were sponsoring the football team Newcastle United for £8 million a year. Several MPs spoke out against the deal and the leader of Newcastle City Council told The Guardian he was "appalled and sickened" that the club had signed a deal with "a legal loan shark" and, in July 2013, Papiss Cissé refused to wear the kit, citing religious reasons as a practising Muslim despite "pictures ... of him gambling in a casino". The sponsorship was not renewed after the 2016–17 season.

In 2012, Wonga.com sponsored ITV's Red or Black?, which was widely criticised.

The Guardian reported, in November 2012, that a computer in the Wonga offices appeared to have been used to remove from the company's Wikipedia page a reference to controversy over its sponsorship of Newcastle United Football Club and to delete the category of "usury" under the See Also section.

Wonga sponsored Blackpool Football Club from 2010 to the end of the 2014–15 season. Wonga's sponsorship of Heart of Midlothian Football Club ended prematurely in 2014 after the club cancelled the deal.

== Awards ==
- Alternative Lender of the Year, Credit Today Magazine 2010.
- Winner, The Guardian Digital Innovation Digital Entrepreneur Award 2011.
- Number 1, The Sunday Times Tech Track 100 2011.
- Fastest Growing Company, Media Momentum Awards 2012.

== Criticism ==
=== Alleged tax avoidance ===
The involvement of the Swiss company and the transfer of the trademark to it in 2012 have been seen by Corporate Watch as part of a scheme by the firm designed to avoid tax. According to Accountancy Age, in 2012, a net amount of £35 million was paid to WDFC SA, the profit on which will only be taxed in Switzerland. Several Wonga executives, are now believed to be based in Geneva in connection with the business of WDFC SA.

In 2013, an Irish subsidiary of Wonga patented "user authentication software", telling Corporate Watch that "it is common practice for international groups to consolidate their IP holdings in a location where the substantial activity relating to the IP is performed." Richard Murphy from Tax Research UK commented that "the transfer of key business processes – especially those that are technology based and that can be protected by patents and copyrights – is a classic way in which companies try to move their profits between countries."

=== Debt collection practices ===
In May 2012, the company was required by the Office of Fair Trading (OFT) to improve its debt collection practices, after it was found that it had sent letters to customers in 2010 accusing them of committing fraud and saying that the police might be informed. Telephone scripts used by Wonga warned borrowers working in the public or financial sectors that their terms of employment said they should not be in debt. Wonga appealed the decision and said it believed it had grounds for suspecting dishonest conduct by the specific customers to whom letters had been sent, and that they had been sent on isolated occasions more than 18 months previously and had not been sent since. It stated that it had put in place procedures to make sure similar problems did not occur in future, and that since then it referred cases of suspected fraud to an in-house team to investigate. The phone scripts had not been used since January 2010, it said. In November 2013, after being challenged repeatedly by members of Parliament in a Business, Innovation and Skills select committee hearing on pay day lenders, Wonga said that they had not been censured by the OFT, but had been asked to make various changes, and that criticism by the OFT was "an open issue"; the company could not say more on an ongoing process. The practice of allowing debtors to "roll on" an existing loan was also called into question by the MPs. Regulation for the consumer credit industry passed from the OFT to the new Financial Conduct Authority (FCA) from April 2014.

In June 2014, the FCA found that Wonga's debt collection practices were unfair and ordered that they compensate affected customers. The FCA found that between October 2008 and November 2010, Wonga had sent their customers letters purporting to be from non-existent law firms "Chainey, D'Amato & Shannon" and "Barker and Lowe Legal Recoveries", described as "fake" in reports, to collect money from them. In some cases, customers were charged for the supposed lawyers' fees for these letters; Labour MP Stella Creasy asked why the police were not investigating. This practice had been uncovered by the OFT in 2011, after Wonga was asked to disclose information about its debt collection practices. "Wonga's misconduct was very serious because it had the effect of exacerbating an already difficult situation for customers in arrears," said Clive Adamson, director of supervision at the FCA. He added: "The FCA expects firms to pay particular attention to fair treatment of those who have difficulty in meeting their loan repayments". Richard Lloyd of Which? described the findings as "a shocking new low for the payday industry that is already dogged by bad practice and Wonga deserves to have the book thrown at it." Wonga UK managing director, Tessa Cook, said: "Today is not a proud day for Wonga and I'd like to apologise". As the misconduct happened before the FCA took over the regulation of payday lenders, it is unable to fine Wonga. It also said there would be no criminal investigation as it wanted to set up a compensation scheme (of about £2.6 million) as quickly as possible and a criminal probe would take time. However, the issue was later passed onto the police for potential criminal investigation. The head of the Law Society, Desmond Hudson, said that Wonga's activity, which he qualified as dishonest, could amount to blackmail, deception, and other breaches of the law. The City of London Police began reassessing the case for an investigation, but announced the following year that after a thorough review of all the material gathered, that there was insufficient evidence to progress an investigation.

Consequent to discussions with the FCA, on 2 October 2014 Wonga agreed to write off the debts – thought to total £220m – of 330,000 customers who were in arrears of thirty days or more.

=== Church of England ===
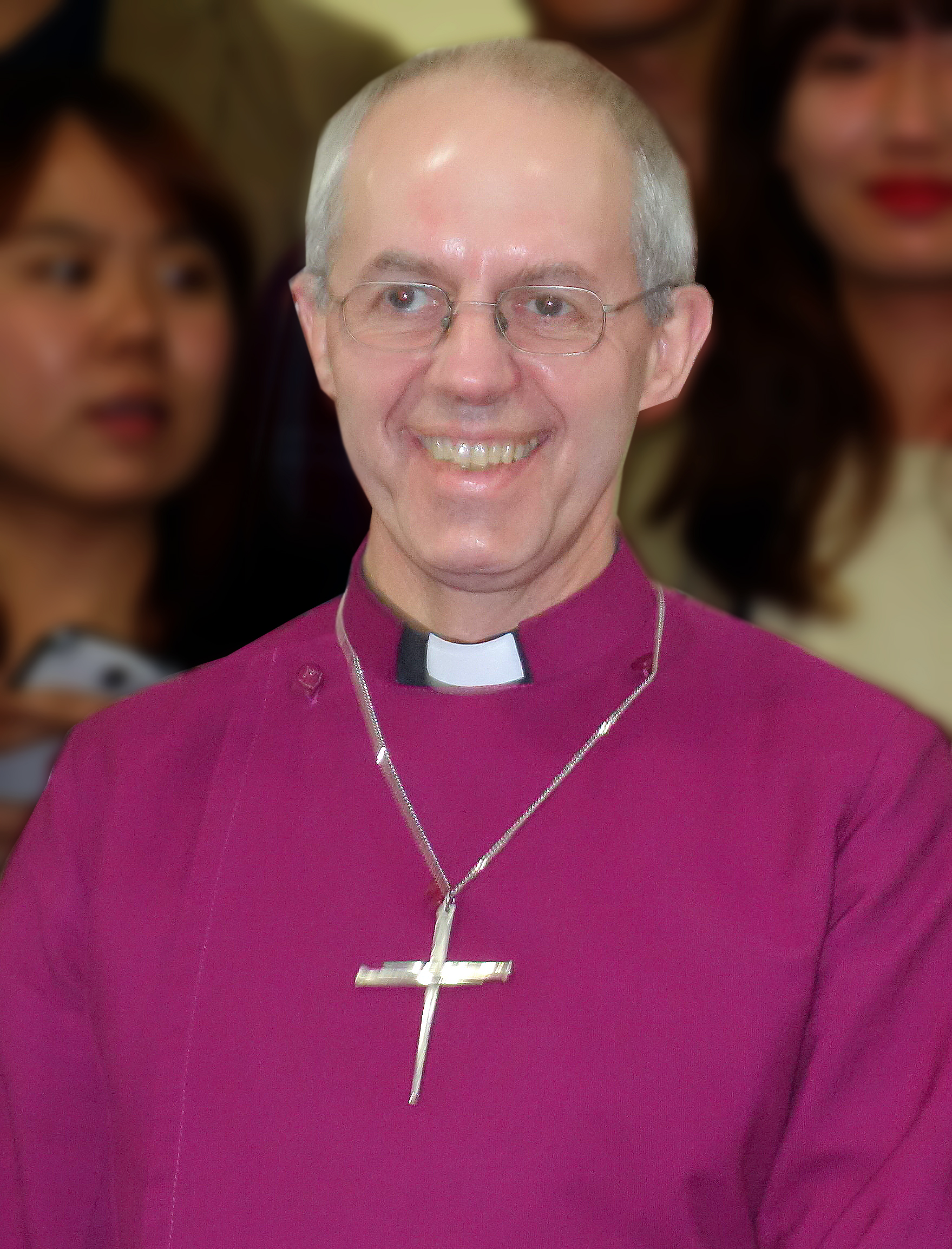
Justin Welby was highly critical of Wonga.

In May 2012, Justin Welby (then the Bishop of Durham) called Wonga.com's high interest rates "shocking" and "usurious". Wonga declined to comment.

By July 2013, Welby was Archbishop of Canterbury and had been a member of the Parliamentary Commission on Banking Standards. He announced that he had had a "good conversation" with Errol Damelin and told him that he wanted to see competition, not legislation, put Wonga out of business. According to the BBC, the church would help credit unions by providing premises and expertise. However, Welby was reported to be furious when the Financial Times pointed out that, despite denying involvement in payday lending, the Church Pension fund invested in venture capitalists Accel Partners which raised funds for Wonga in 2009.

In a November 2013 interview for ITV, Niall Wass defended the firm's practices and challenged critics to "go use the service, see if you think it is fair and transparent, take out £30 for ten days, pay it back after a week, look at the price, tell me if that is fair and transparent."

By July 2014, The Church of England had severed its ties with the payday lender.

=== Politicians ===
An all-party Early Day Motion tabled in November 2011 highlighted Wonga's "high APR" and sought to restrict the level of interest that can be charged on all loans by financial institutions. British MP Stella Creasy has also proposed legislation for interest rate caps. A Policis report on proposed interest rate capping said it would cause an exit from the market and those with access to the credit mainstream would be diverted to products such as overdrafts and revolving credit that could be higher cost than high APR products and those without access to credit would be diverted to the black credit market. The Times said capping will further limit the availability of credit to people from regulated entities.

On 20 November 2012, Creasy demanded an apology from the company after The Guardian reported that abusive tweets were sent to her by Wonga employees. Further investigation of the Creasy case showed that computers registered to Wonga.com's London office were used to abuse Creasy over Twitter, and delete criticism, as well as the reference to "usury" from the English Wikipedia's Wonga.com page. Wonga.com admitted that a "junior employee" may have sent the tweets and defended what it regards as its right to correct "inaccurate" Wikipedia articles, though Wikipedia policy on conflict of interest says such edits are "strongly discouraged." Wonga.com later apologised to Creasy and condemned the Twitter comments, saying they were posted without the knowledge of the company and disciplinary action would be taken.

In June 2013, the consumer minister called payday lenders to a summit to discuss "widespread irresponsible lending." The article quoted the APR of Wonga -the largest lender as 5835%. Wonga's pre-tax profits were quoted as £62.4m.

In November 2013, Labour Party leader Ed Miliband criticised payday lenders for creating a "Wonga economy" and "a quiet crisis of thousands of families trapped in unpayable debt." He also called for Wonga's cartoon-type ads aired during children's programmes to be banned, and promised to introduce legislation to that effect. He accused Wonga and other payday lenders of 'targeting children'.

In 2018, once the company had gone into administration, chairman of the Commons Work and Pensions Committee Frank Field wrote to the Archbishop of Canterbury, Justin Welby, in a letter urging the Archbishop to lead a consortium with Wonga's administrators and for the Church of England to purchase the company's loans, preventing the company from selling its loans on to debt recovery businesses at "knockdown rates".

=== APR and the cost of a loan ===
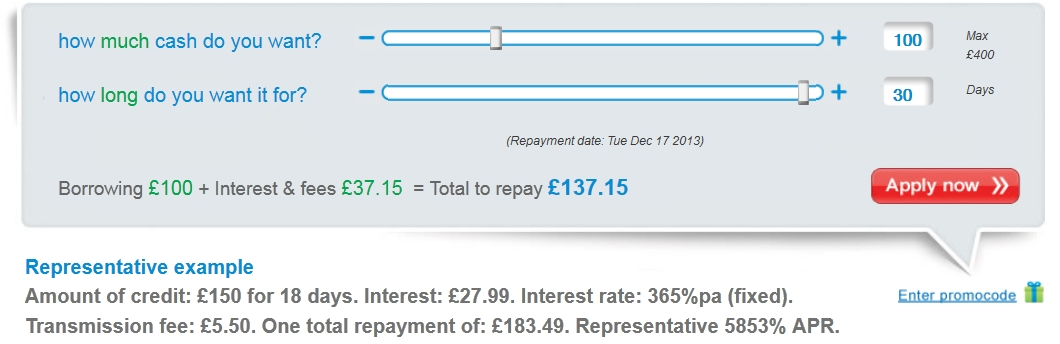
Screenshot from Wonga.com showing the cost of borrowing £100 for 30 days on 17 November 2013.

The firm claimed its loans were often cheaper than unauthorised bank charges and although APR disclosure is mandatory, it is a poor comparison measure for short-term loans. The Business, Innovation and Skills Committee heard evidence from consumer money expert Martin Lewis that the total cost of a payday loan was more useful than APR. Lewis calculated in his blog that at a compounding interest rate of 4,212%, a £100 loan that is not repaid would in seven years amount to more than the USA's entire national debt, however, he explained that his calculation "bears little resemblance to reality", because Wonga does not charge compound interest. He also explained that he had performed this calculation purely to raise awareness of the risks of payday loans and concluded by expressing the hope that his example would make people "think twice before getting payday borrowing". Wonga stated that they stopped charging interest altogether once a loan became more than 60 days overdue.

Wonga argued that their rates may be high but the amount charged is transparent and without lenders like them, borrowers would be forced to use illegal lenders. In April 2014, a loan shark in Manchester was jailed for illegal money lending and other offences despite claiming that his rates were lower than Wonga. His lawyer said: "Within his community there are large numbers of people who because of their debt history are very limited in terms of the places they can go, other than companies such as Wonga."

In October 2014, the UK's Advertising Standards Authority (ASA) banned Wonga from using a TV advert that it said breached its code because of a claim that customers would save money. The authority said this was likely to be interpreted as a statement that Wonga's loans were cheaper than those of other lenders and was therefore a price comparison. It ruled that Wonga should consequently have informed consumers of its 5,853% annual interest rate. The ruling was in response to a complaint from the charity Citizens Advice, whose chief executive Gillian Guy, said: "Adverts must be clear about what taking out a loan means and how much it will cost. The consequences are really serious when payday lending goes wrong. High interest rates and fees can mean that a small loan balloons into a huge debt... both the advertising and payday loan industries need to look at why so many adverts are not meeting the grade and change their ways". It was the third Wonga advert to be banned by the ASA in 2014.
