= Masaaki Yamada =

Japanese plasma physicist (born 1942)

- 山田雅章
- Born: August 9, 1942 (age 83); Japan
- Education: University of Tokyo (B.S.); University of Illinois (Ph.D.)
- Awards: James Clerk Maxwell Prize for Plasma Physics (2015)
- Scientific career
- Fields: Plasma physics
- Thesis: (1973)
- Doctoral students: Troy Carter

Masaaki Yamada (Japanese: 山田雅章, Hepburn: Yamada Masaaki; born August 9, 1942 in Japan) is a Japanese plasma physicist known for his studies on magnetic reconnection.

Yamada obtained a bachelor's degree in applied physics at the University of Tokyo in 1966 and a master's degree in nuclear engineering in 1968, and received a doctorate in physics from the University of Illinois in 1973. He was then at Princeton University and from 1978 at its Princeton Plasma Physics Laboratory (PPPL), where he and Robert Ellis led the development of the Spheromak S-1, a compact toroidal device for plasma confinement from 1978 to 1988, which was investigated for some time as an alternative to the Tokamak. He has been a Principal Research Physicist at the PPPL since 1982 (2015 he is a Distinguished Laboratory Research Fellow). Since the beginning of the 1990s, he has been leading a research program to research magnetic reconnection at the PPPL (Magnetic Reconnection Experiment, MRX) with applications both on fusion plasmas and in astrophysics.

He is a Fellow of the American Physical Society in 1985, received the John Dawson Award for Excellence in Plasma Physics Research from APS in 2002 and the Kaul Prize from Princeton University in 2003. In 2015, he received the James Clerk Maxwell Prize for Plasma Physics for his research on reconnection and as a pioneer in laboratory plasma physics for astrophysics. He has published over 200 scientific publications.

He was a visiting professor at the École Polytechnique Fédérale de Lausanne, the University of Tokyo and Kyoto University.
