= Russell Kulsrud =

American physicist (1928–2025)

Russell M. Kulsrud
- Born: April 10, 1928; Lindsborg, Kansas, U.S.
- Died: September 23, 2025 (aged 97)
- Education: University of Maryland (B.A.); University of Chicago (M.S., Ph.D.)
- Awards: James Clerk Maxwell Prize for Plasma Physics (1993)
- Scientific career
- Fields: Plasma physics
- Thesis: Effect of Magnetic Fields on Generation of Noise by Isotropic Turbulence (1954)
- Doctoral advisor: Subrahmanyan Chandrasekhar
- Doctoral students: Troy Carter
- Website: web.archive.org/web/20250124191726/theory.pppl.gov/people/profile.php?pid=3&n=Russell-KulsrudBiography

Russell M. Kulsrud (April 10, 1928 – September 23, 2025) was an American physicist who specialized in plasma physics and astrophysics.

== Life and career ==
Kulsrud studied at the University of Maryland where he received his bachelor's degree in 1949, and then at the University of Chicago, where he completed his master's degree in 1952 and received his doctorate from Subrahmanyan Chandrasekhar in 1954 (Effect of Magnetic Fields on Generation of Noise by Isotropic Turbulence). From 1954, he was in the Matterhorn Nuclear Fusion Project at Princeton University and subsequently at the Princeton Plasma Physics Laboratory. In 1964, he became head of the theoretical department. In 1966, he and his wife Helene Kulsrud moved to Yale University where he became a professor. He returned to Princeton University as Professor of Astrophysical Sciences in 1967, where he remained until he retired in 2004.

In 1993, he received the James Clerk Maxwell Prize for Plasma Physics for "his pioneering contributions to basic plasma theory, to the physics of magnetically confined plasmas, and to plasma astrophysics. His important work en-compasses plasma equilibria and stability, adiabatic invariance, ballooning modes, runaway electrons, colliding beams, spin-polarized plasmas, and cosmic-ray instabilities".

Kulsrud died on September 23, 2025, at the age of 97.

== Books ==
- Plasma Physics for Astrophysics. Princeton University Press, Princeton, N.J. 2004, ISBN 978-0-691-12073-7.
