= Robert Ellis (physicist) =

African American physicist known for work in plasma physics

Robert A. Ellis
- Born: Robert Anderson Ellis Jr. 1927; Kansas City, Missouri, U.S.
- Died: December 15, 1989 (aged 62); Princeton, New Jersey, U.S.
- Education: Fisk University; Yale University; University of Iowa
- Scientific career
- Fields: Plasma physics
- Workplaces: Tennessee Agricultural & Industrial State College; Princeton Plasma Physics Laboratory
- Thesis: Low momentum end of the spectrum of heavy primary cosmic rays (1954)
- Doctoral advisor: James Van Allen

Robert Anderson Ellis Jr. (1927 – 15 December 1989) was an American physicist and head of experimental projects at the Princeton Plasma Physics Laboratory.

== Early life and education ==
Robert Ellis was born in Kansas City, Missouri.

Ellis received a bachelor's degree from Fisk University in 1948, and a master's degree from Yale University in 1949. After completing his master's education, Ellis began work as an instructor at the Tennessee Agricultural & Industrial State College, in Nashville, Tennessee (now Tennessee State University).

While on leave from his instructor position, Ellis began doctoral studies at the University of Iowa. James Van Allen was Ellis' advisor, and Ellis was Van Allen's first doctoral student. At Iowa, Ellis also worked as a research assistant.

Ellis' thesis was titled "Low momentum end of the spectrum of heavy primary cosmic rays," and was published in February 1954.

== Career ==
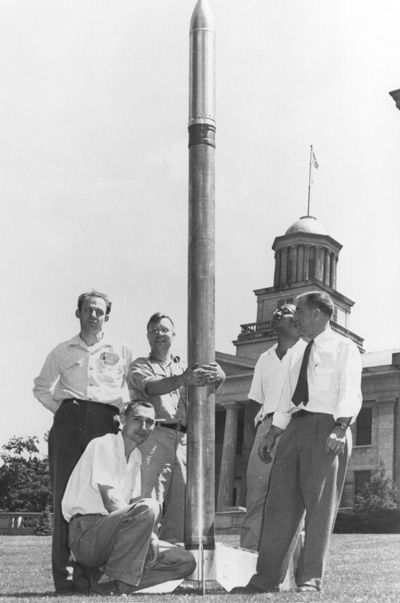
A model Deacon rocket with payload, representative of those used to test the ionosphere. Ellis is second from the right.

After completing his PhD, Ellis returned to his instructor position at Tennessee Agricultural & Industrial State College, where he was later promoted to full professor. In 1954, he was invited as one of 73 "outstanding physicists" to take part in the Cosmic Ray Conference, sponsored by Duke University and the National Science Foundation. The same year, he joined a research team with James Van Allen and Melvin B. Gottlieb that traveled to the Arctic to investigate cosmic ray activity in the polar region. In a report on this trip, Ellis was credited with the development of balloon launched rocket techniques.

In 1956, Ellis joined Project Matterhorn, a Princeton-based working group focused on controlled fusion studies. In his work within Project Matterhorn, Ellis focused on magnetic confinement and heating of plasmas in stellarators. The group's studies on B-1 and B-3 devices were the first to document ohmic heating; anomalous transport across the magnetic field; radio frequency plasma heating at the lower-hybrid frequency; and nonlinear cyclotron harmonic interactions.

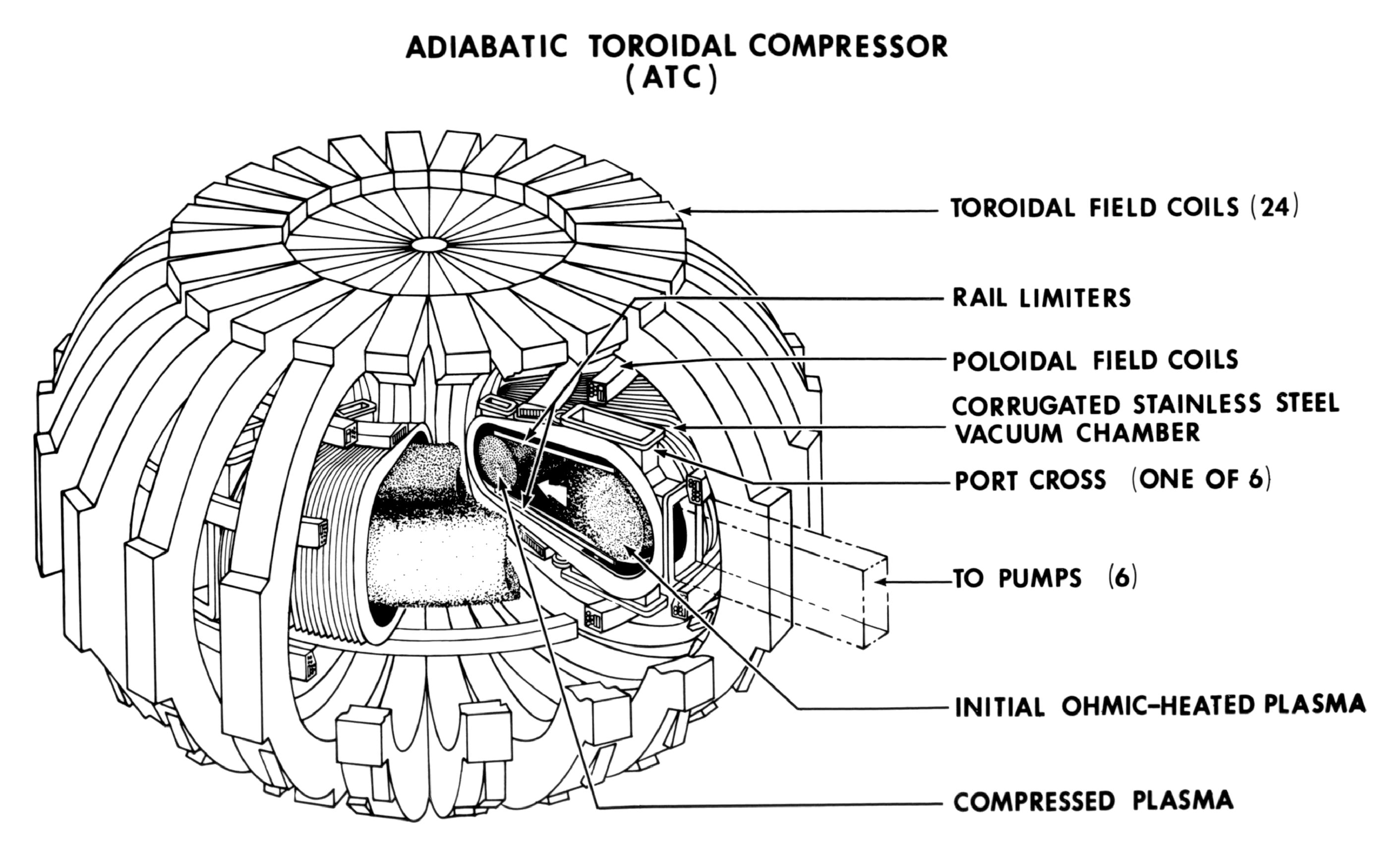
Schematic of the Adiabatic Toroidal Compressor (ATC)

Project Matterhorn was led by Lyman Spitzer, Jr., and after the termination of nuclear weapons research in 1958, in 1961 the project was declassified and renamed the Princeton Plasma Physics Laboratory (PPPL).

In 1969, Ellis spent six months at the Institute of Nuclear Physics in Novosibirsk, USSR, with a focus on fostering international collaboration in the sciences. Ellis also served as foreign secretary of the Advisory Committee on the USSR and Eastern Europe for the National Academy of Sciences.

From 1972 to 1976, Ellis was the group leader for the Adiabatic Toroidal Compressor tokamak at Princeton University. This device was used in fusion experiments for the U.S. Atomic Energy Commission at PPPL from 1972 to 1977. It was the first tokamak without a copper liner.

During his career, Ellis was a member of the Department of Energy's Compact Toroid Coordination Committee, in which he and Japanese plasma physicist Masaaki Yamada led the Spheromak project. Other professional appointments included:

- Member, the Science Advisory Committee for NASA Research Laboratories (1976-1978)
- Head of the physics section of the International Atomic Energy Agency in Vienna, Austria (two years)
- U.S. representative to the Commission on Plasma Physics of the International Union of Pure and Applied Physics (1984)

In 1988, Ellis began as head of experimental projects at PPPL, where he would work until his death in 1989. In this role, he was responsible for all non-TFTR experimental work.

== Personal life ==
Robert Ellis married fellow Tennessee State University professor Victoria Toms while they were both teaching there. Together they moved to New Jersey for his research job.

Robert Ellis's son, Bob Ellis, is also a physicist. Bob Ellis studied at Princeton University and the New Jersey Institute of Technology, and is currently chief engineer at the Princeton Plasma Physics Laboratory. The father and son duo briefly worked together in the PPPL in 1981, when Robert Ellis, Jr., headed the S-1 Spheromak and Bob Ellis worked on S-1 before moving to TFTR to work on diagnostics.

Ellis died December 15, 1989, in Princeton, New Jersey, from kidney failure.

== Legacy ==
Princeton University sponsors a fellowship honoring Robert A. Ellis that is awarded at the Princeton Plasma Physics Laboratory.
