= Melvin B. Gottlieb =

American high-energy physicist

Melvin Burt Gottlieb (May 25, 1917 in Chicago, Illinois – December 1, 2000 in Haverford Township, Pennsylvania) was a high-energy physicist and director of the Princeton Plasma Physics Laboratory (1961–1980). With Van Allen he did the early studies of the magnetosphere, and he later led US fusion research.

== Personal life ==
Gottlieb was born on May 25, 1917, to Ezra Benjamin Gottlieb and Sara Gottlieb née Hotz in Chicago and received his bachelor's degree in mathematics in 1940 and doctorate in physics in 1952 from the University of Chicago. He was married on June 26, 1948, to Golda Gehrman and they had two daughters.

== Early physics ==
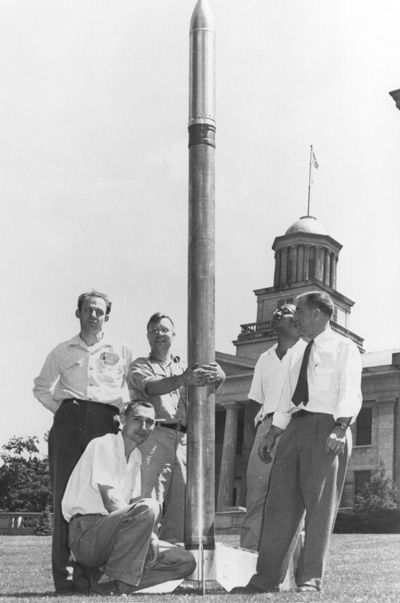
A model Deacon rocket with payload, representative of those used to test the ionosphere. Left to right, standing: Melvin B. Gottlieb, Lee Blodgett, Robert Ellis, Jr., and James Van Allen, and in front, Leslie H. Meredith.

During World War II Gottlieb worked on radar counter-measures and with Van Allen on early cosmic ray studies.

In 1950 Gottlieb accepted an appointment as assistant professor at the State University of Iowa where he continued to work with Van Allen. Starting in 1952 he went on several expeditions to the Arctic on behalf of the Office of Naval Research, where balloons, attached to ion chambers, and launched from rockets were used to study the magnetosphere.

== Fusion ==
Beginning in 1954 Gottlieb started work on fusion research at the Princeton Plasma Physics Laboratory for the federal government. The work was at the time highly classified. When he arrived Lyman Spitzer’s Stellarator was in its early development. His administrative abilities were quickly recognized and as early as 1958 he was testifying before congress about the need for adequate funds for fusion research.

The declassification of fusion research in 1958 brought Gottlieb’s work international attention at the Atoms-for-Peace Conference in 1958. He became director of the Princeton Plasma Physics Laboratory in 1961 succeeding Lyman Spitzer, Jr. Fusion research had reached an impasse with its inability to control the high-energy plasma. This impasse was not broken until the 1969 Russian development of the tokamak (doughnut-shaped) electromagnetic plasma container. Despite doubts of other American physicists, Gottlieb seized upon the tokamak concept, even visiting the Institute of Atomic Energy in Moscow in 1969. In 1971, funded by the US Air Force, he traveled throughout western Europe visiting plasma research facilities, and by 1972 had managed to get the $13 million funding to build the Princeton Large Torus. He subsequently obtained the funding for the follow-on Tokamak Fusion Test Reactor (TFTR), but didn’t stay as director to see it finally completed in 1982. He was succeeded as director in 1981 by Harold Furth.

In the 1980s he was employed by Grumman Aerospace Corporation, as a technical advisor and "de facto" lobbyist.
