= Jonty Hurwitz =

Artist, engineer, polymath (born 1969)

- Born: 3 September 1969 (age 57); Johannesburg, South Africa
- Education: University of the Witwatersrand; University of Cape Town
- Known for: Sculpture and Financial Technology, CTO of Wonga.com
- Website: sentient.art

Jonty Hurwitz (born 2 September 1969 in Johannesburg) is a British South African artist, engineer and entrepreneur. Hurwitz creates scientifically inspired artworks and anamorphic sculptures. He is recognised for the smallest human form ever created using nano technology.

== Early life ==
Jonty Hurwitz was born in Johannesburg, South Africa, to Selwin, a hotelier and entrepreneur and Marcia Berger, a drama lecturer and teacher. Jonty and his sister (Tamara) spent their early life living in small hotels in rural towns in South Africa while his father built up his business.

Jonty studied Electrical Engineering at the University of the Witwatersrand in Johannesburg from 1989 to 1993. His major was Signal Processing. He then joined the University of Cape Town Remote Sensing Group as a full-time researcher under Professor Michael Inggs, publishing a paper on radar pattern recognition.

== Career in art ==
Hurwitz, in collaboration with is partner, Yifat Davidoff, produces work focuses on the aesthetics of art in the context of human perception. His early body of sculpture was discovered by Estelle Lovatt during 2011 in an article for Art of England Magazine: "Thinning the divide gap between art and science, Hurwitz is cognisant of the two being holistically co-joined in the same way as we are naturally, comfortably split between our spiritual and operational self".

Hurwitz began producing sculptures in 2008. In 2009, his first sculpture 'Yoda and the Anamorph' won the People's Choice Bentliff Prize of the Maidstone Museum and Art Gallery. Later in 2009 he won the Noble Sculpture Prize and was commissioned to install his first large scale work (a nude study of his father called 'Dietro di me') in the Italian village Colletta di Castelbianco. In 2010, he was selected as a finalist for the 4th International Arte Laguna Prize in Venice, Italy.

In January 2013, Hurwitz's anamorphic work was described by the art blogger Christopher Jobson. In early 2013 Hurwitz was introduced to the Savoy Hotel by London art agent Sally Vaughan. Hurwitz was commissioned to be Artist in Residence at the hotel and produce a sculpture of the hotel's historically iconic Mascot Kaspar the Cat. Hurwitz lived for several months in the hotel producing the sculpture. By late 2013, in a special edition of Art of England on portraiture, Hurwitz was cited as the No. 1 portrait artist in the UK. In January 2014 Hurwitz was voted No. 46 in the top 100 artists of 2013 by the American art site, Empty Kingdom. In the same month, Hurwitz's anamorphic work was blogged as "The best of 2013" by the American Art and Culture magazine, Juxtapoz. In 2013 Hurwitz's work was also curated by Science Gallery International for a touring group show entitled 'Illusion' curated by Trinity College Dublin. The exhibition led to a 2014/2015 tour in the USA, Kuala Lumpur, Malaysia and Leipzig, Germany.

In late 2014, he released a series of "nano sculptures" under the title of ″Trust″. This series of works captured the attentions of both the scientific and art community, being cited by among others, Nature, Scientific American, Popular Science and Phys.org. In 2015, Hurwitz was elected a member of the Royal British Society of Sculptors. In a 2015 documentary by CNN International on Hurwitz's artwork, BBC Radio 2 art critic Estelle Lovatt commented on Hurwitz's work: "If Leonardo da Vinci were alive today, he would have been doing what Jonty is doing. He would have been using algorithms. No one else works like him today. His art is the mix between the emotional and the intelligent, and that's what gives it that spark." In 2016 the Royal Photographic Society selected a scanning electron microscope photograph by Hurwitz and Stefan Diller as one of the top 100 'Royal Society International Images for Science'.

=== Anamorphic sculpture ===
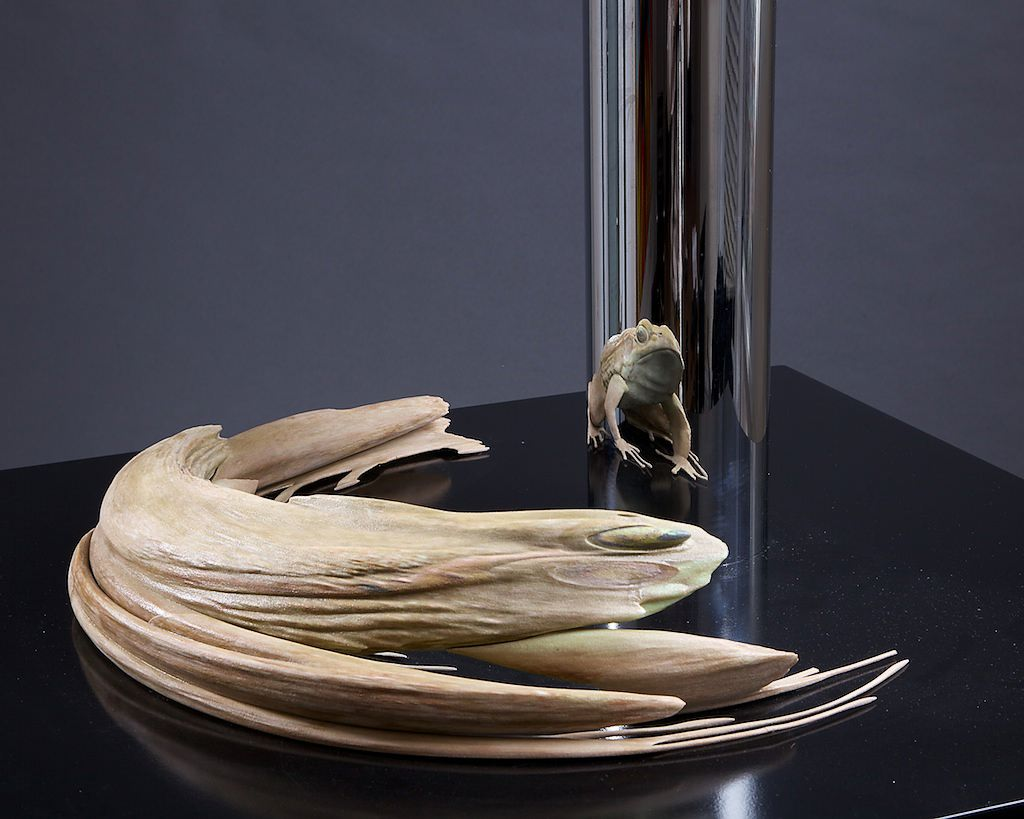
Anamorphosis. Cylindrical anamorphic frog sculpture by Jonty Hurwitz

Hurwitz has produced a body of work using both oblique (perspective) and catoptric (mirror) anamorphosis. Hurwitz names William Scrots, Hans Holbein, M. C. Escher and Da Vinci as influences. In his online talks, Hurwitz explains that this is a function of processing power and that whilst painting is possible in a mirror, three dimensional anamorphosis could only have come into being with the advent of powerful computers. Each of his sculptures involves billions of calculations using an algorithm derived from the mathematical constant π. Hurwitz asserts that his art is "contemporary to the millisecond". Kinetic Art curator and director of the London Kinetica Museum, Dianne Harris, described Hurwitz's art as "the works of polymath Jonty Hurwitz are contemporary trompe-l'œil, at first glance appearing abstract, but in mirrored reflections, representational".

=== Nano sculpture ===
In 2014, Hurwitz and Davidoff worked in the field of Nanoart using multiphoton lithography and photogrammetry to create the world's smallest human portraits of his first love. The works of art were inspired by the nineteenth century marble sculpture of Cupid and Psyche by Antonio Canova. Smaller details of the works are at approximately the 300 nanometer scale, similar to the wavelengths of visible light and hence visualised by a scanning electron microscope. To create these works Hurwitz collaborated with a team of over 20 people, including Stephan Hengsbach of the Karlsruhe Institute of Technology and Yehiam Prior of the Weizmann Institute of Science. In February 2015, Hurwitz's sculpture "Trust" was awarded the world record for the "Smallest sculpture of a human" by the Guinness Book of Records.

== Technology ==
Hurwitz is the Founder and Chairman of the AI research company Daizy, overseeing the long-term research generative AI model for financial media, with a focus on Risk and Impact. He is also the co-founder of Claim Technology Ltd.

Hurwitz arrived in London in 1995 following his travels in India and got his first job researching financial data visualization for Gilbert de Botton, Chairman and Founder of Global Asset Management (GAM). Hurwitz left Global Asset Management after two years forming his own company, Delve, to develop the R&D in financial data visualisation. In 1996, GAM launched its financial reporting technology built by Hurwitz. Hurwitz's newly formed graphics and software team evolved over several years publishing several visualization projects (non-exhaustive list) like News International visual archives on the Cold War and the Industrial Revolution (1997), Biosys an environmental simulation published by Take 2 Interactive (1998) and "Oceans of Innovation" by the British Foreign Office (1998). The latter work was nominated for a BAFTA Award. In 2005, Hurwitz's company Delve was acquired by Alternative Investment Market listed company Statpro Group PLC (SOG). Hurwitz joined Statpro as Creative Director where he designed the first Cloud Computing analytics and risk platform for asset data. In 2008, Statpro launched its flagship product Statpro Revolution which was the result of this R&D. By 2014, eight out of the top ten largest asset managers in the world were Statpro Clients.

Hurwitz was co-founding Chief Technology Officer of Wonga.com in 2007 where he designed and built the first real-time online consumer loan system in the world. During this period, Wonga's technology won several awards (listed below). By 2011, Wonga had begun to attract criticism and Hurwitz, as the inventor of the technology, found himself with not enough influence to guide the now large company's use of his designs. After several attempts at changing Wonga's strategy, he resigned from his operational role in November 2011, and released his sculpture entitled Co-Founder.

Hurwitz's technology is credited with several innovations in the financial services industry:

- Financial sliders. A User Interface innovation which allowed customers to easily to get a real-time quote on the exact cost of a loan in pound and pennies. This method of communicating loan information to consumers has been adopted by several of the major high street UK lenders. These include (non-exhaustive list): HSBC, Royal Bank of Scotland, Barclays, Halifax, Lloyds, Nationwide, Santander Bank, Co-operative Bank, NatWest and Bank of Scotland.
- Real-time risk technology. Wonga's risk engine was the first ever to evaluate the credit worthiness of a customer in near real time on the internet based on the collection of data from alternative sources in combination with traditional credit scores. The consumer risk technology provided the ability to transfer money to customers within 12 minutes on the basis of the decision.

== Publications ==
=== TEDx Talk ===
- The Art and Science of Love: The World's Smallest Sculpture, TEDx MPI Stuttgart, Baden-Württemberg, Germany.

=== Academic references and citations ===
- Vračarević, Dejan (4 February 2021). СЈАЈАН ТРЕНУТАК У РАСКОРАКУ – мапирана пројекција у просторно ограниченим условима. Интердисциплинарне студије Универзитета уметности (Thesis) (in Sardinian). hdl:123456789/490.
- Anamorphic projection on an arbitrary uneven surface, Cej, Rok and Solina, Franc (2020, Univerza v Ljubljani, Slovenia
- Li, Danzhu; Van Der Veer, Gerrit C. (2020). "Supporting the Experience of Stakeholders of Multimedia Art – Towards an Ontology". Beyond Interactions. Lecture Notes in Computer Science. Vol. 11930. pp. 3–15. doi:10.1007/978-3-030-46540-7_1. hdl:1871.1/221a8f17-7559-46e4-af85-f6d74a6f92b9. ISBN 978-3-030-46539-1. S2CID 218489981.
- Beyond Interactions, 2019. JA Nocera. INTERACT 2019 IFIP TC 13 Workshops, Paphos, Cyprus, September 2–6, 2019, Revised Selected Papers.
- Baldacchini, Tommaso (2020). "A collection of microsculptures". Three-Dimensional Microfabrication Using Two-Photon Polymerization. pp. 429–443. doi:10.1016/b978-0-12-817827-0.00011-4. ISBN 978-0-12-817827-0. S2CID 242635768.
- Kaya-, Yunus (2020). "Sanatta Evrimleşen Bakış Açısı: 'Anamorfoz' ve Çağdaş Bir Uygulayıcısı Olarak Kurt Wenner" [The Evolving Perspective in Art: 'Anamorphosis' and Kurt Wenner As a Contemporary Anamorphosis Artist]. Journal of Turkish Studies (in Turkish). 15 (2): 1079–1099. doi:10.29228/TurkishStudies.42083.
- Yetisen, Ali K.; Coskun, Ahmet F.; England, Grant; Cho, Sangyeon; Butt, Haider; Hurwitz, Jonty; Kolle, Mathias; Khademhosseini, Ali; Hart, A. John; Folch, Albert; Yun, Seok Hyun (March 2016). "Art on the Nanoscale and Beyond" (PDF). Advanced Materials. 28 (9): 1724–1742. Bibcode:2016AdM....28.1724Y. doi:10.1002/adma.201502382. PMID 26671704. S2CID 5825217.
- Technology and the Arts: Current Works of Eric Whitaker and Jonty Hurwitz. International Science and Technology Conference (ISTEC) 2015, St. Petersburg, Russia. Written and presented by Mark Konewko, Marquette University, Wisconsin, USA.
- Nanotechnology Cleans Up, Carolien Coon, Physics World, May 2016.
- Schüller, Christian; Panozzo, Daniele; Sorkine-Hornung, Olga (19 November 2014). "Appearance-mimicking surfaces". ACM Transactions on Graphics. 33 (6): 1–10. doi:10.1145/2661229.2661267. S2CID 14742918.
- Čučaković, Aleksandar; Paunović, Marijana (July 2015). "Cylindrical Mirror Anamorphosis and Urban-Architectural Ambience". Nexus Network Journal. 17 (2): 605–622. doi:10.1007/s00004-015-0239-7.
- Two Photon Absorption & Carrier Generation in Semiconductors. F.R. Palomo1, I. Vila, M.Fernández, P.DeCastro, M. Moll, Departamento Ingeniería Electrónica, Escuela Superior de Ingenieros Universidad de Sevilla, Spain, Instituto de Física de Cantabria, Santander, Spain, SSD Group, CERN, Geneva, Switzerland.
- Symeonidou, Ioanna (December 2016). "Anamorphic Experiences in 3D Space: Shadows, Projections and Other Optical Illusions". Nexus Network Journal. 18 (3): 779–797. doi:10.1007/s00004-016-0298-4.
- The Magic of Anamorphosis in Elementary and Middle School. Marina Barreto and Diego Lieban, Proceedings of Bridges 2017: Mathematics, Art, Music, Architecture, Education, Culture Pages 553–556.
- de Comite, Francesco; Grisoni, Laurent (2 November 2015). "Numerical anamorphosis: An artistic exploration". SIGGRAPH ASIA 2015 Art Papers. pp. 1–7. doi:10.1145/2835641.2835642. ISBN 9781450339162. S2CID 8855773.
- Sanat ve Tasarımda Anamorfik Görüntüler (Anamorphic Images in Art and Design). Bengisu KELEŞOĞLU, Mehtap UYGUNGÖZ, Anadolu University Art & Design Magazine, Issue 7, 2016.
- Ferreira, Helena (5 September 2016). "Entre a realidade e o engano: as anamorfoses na comunicação visual". Visualidades. 14 (1). doi:10.5216/vis.v14i1.33969.
- Letkiewicz, Marek (1 January 2012). "Drzwi Do Nowej Percepcji – Londyński Festiwal Kinetica Art Fair 2013" [Doors To A New Perception – The London Festival Kinetica Art Fair 2013]. Annales UMCS, Artes (in Polish). 10 (2). doi:10.2478/umcsart-2013-0004.
- Anamorphosis in the work of foreign artists at the end of the XX-XXI century (Russian), статья в журнале – научная статья, YOUTH BULLETIN OF THE ST PETERSBURG STATE INSTITUTE OF CULTURE, 2(6), pages 136–139,2016.
- Art and Science Education in Optics: From Multidisciplinary to Transdisciplinary (Arte e Ciência no Ensino de Óptica: Da Multidisciplinaridade à Transdisciplinaridade), Claudemir Batista, Edivaldo Lima, Universidade de São Paulo, e-Disciplinas, Sistema de Apoio às Disciplinas.
- Rodrigues, Maria Helena Wyllie L.; Grimaldi, Madalena R.; Rodrigues, Daniel W. L. (2019). "A Geometric Look at 3D Illusionist Techniques". ICGG 2018 - Proceedings of the 18th International Conference on Geometry and Graphics. Advances in Intelligent Systems and Computing. Vol. 809. pp. 1139–1151. doi:10.1007/978-3-319-95588-9_98. ISBN 978-3-319-95587-2. S2CID 192764592.

=== Documentaries ===
- "Is this the World's Smallest Sculpture?". A documentary on Hurwitz's nano sculpture made by CNN featuring curator of the Tate Modern, Chris Dercon, sculptor Antony Gormley and art critic Estelle Lovatt. CNN Ones to Watch shines a spotlight on the up-and-coming creative talents set to be the next big names in culture and the arts. Published online and on CNN International, March 2015.

== Charity ==
Hurwitz is founder of the Separated Child Foundation which supports unaccompanied refugee children arriving on UK shores.

== Exhibitions ==
- 2020, Science Gallery, Venice
- 2019, Body+Soul exhibition, One Canada Square, London
- 2019, SCOPE Art Show, Miami USA
- 2019, Parallel Lines - Drawing and Sculpture Exhibition, The Lightbox Museum, Woking
- 2018, Guangdong Science Center, China
- 2018, Puke Ariki Museum, New Zealand
- 2017, SCOPE Art Show with Modus Art Gallery, Miami, USA
- 2017, Oregon Museum of Science and Industry, USA
- 2017, Science Centre Singapore, Singapore
- 2017, Liberty Science Center, New York, USA
- 2016, Opera Gallery, London, United Kingdom
- 2016, Kunstkraftwerk Museum, Leipzig, Germany
- 2016, International Images for Science, The Royal Photographic Society, London
- 2015, Discovery Place Museum of Science and Technology, Charlotte, USA
- 2015, Petrosains Museum, Kuala Lumpur
- 2014, Fleet Science Center, San Diego
- 2014, Threadneedle Prize Exhibition, ICA London
- 2013, Savoy Hotel, Unveiling of Kaspar the Anamorphic Cat sculpture, Solo show
- 2010, Arte Laguna Prize, Arsenale, Venice
- 2009, Bentlif Gallery, Maidstone Museum & Art Gallery
