= Nanoart =

Art discipline

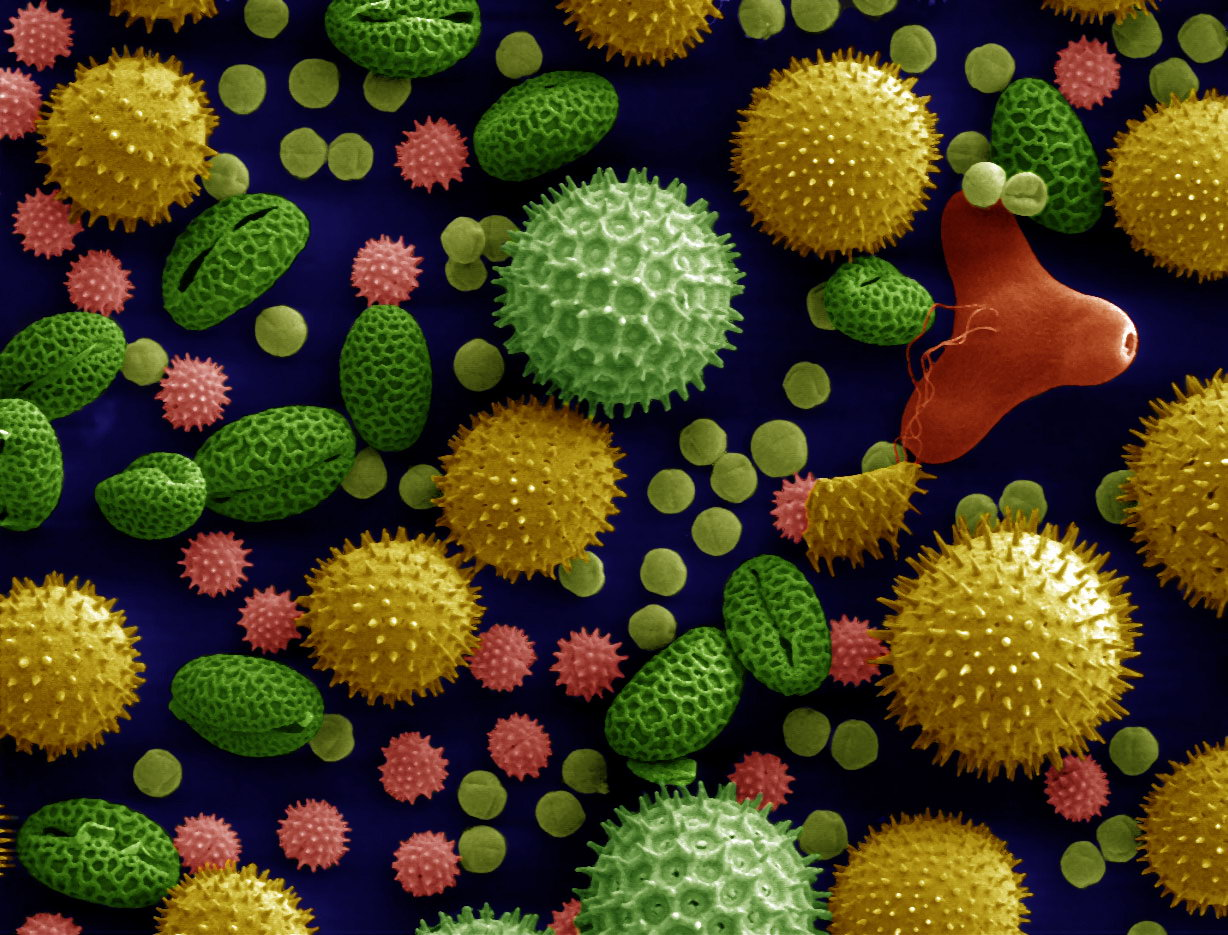
Colorized scanning electron microscopy (SEM) image of pollen from a variety of common plants: sunflower, morning glory, hollyhock, lily, primrose and castor bean

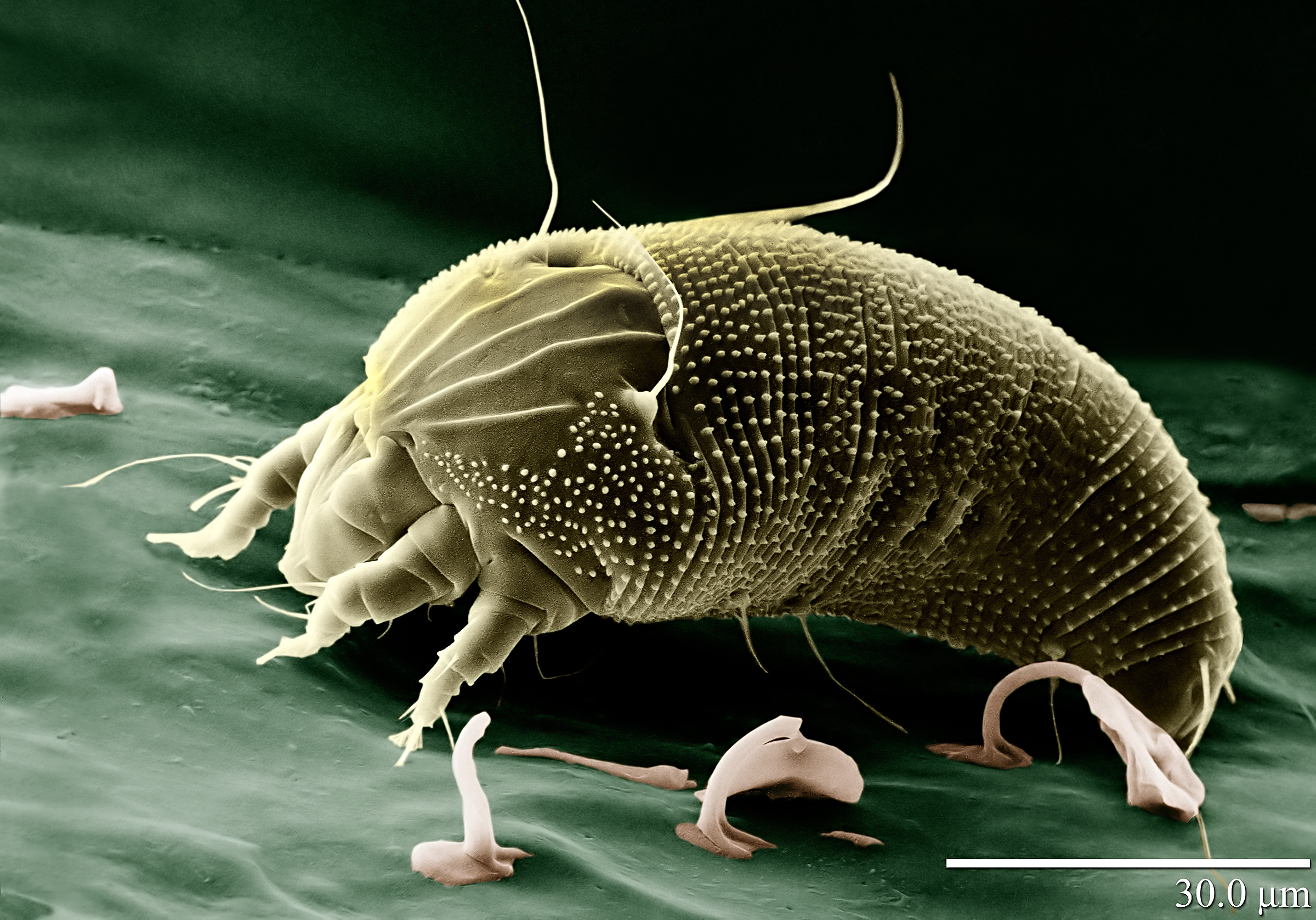
Colorized SEM image of a rust mite

NanoArt is a novel art discipline related to science and technology. It depicts natural or synthetic structures with features sized at the nanometer scale, which are observed by electron or scanning probe microscopy techniques in scientific laboratories. The recorded two or three dimensional images and movies are processed for artistic appeal and presented to the general audience.

One of the aims of NanoArt is to familiarize people with nanoscale objects and advances in their synthesis and manipulation. NanoArt has been presented at traditional art exhibitions around the world. Besides, online competitions have been launched in the 2000s such as the “NANO” 2003 show at Los Angeles County Museum of Art and “Nanomandala”, the 2004 and 2005 installations in New York and Rome by Victoria Vesna and James Gimzewski, and the regular "Science as Art" section launched at the 2006 Materials Research Society Meeting.

A characteristic example of nanoart is A Boy and His Atom, a one-minute stop-motion animated film created in 2012 by IBM Research from 242 images sized by 45×25 nm, which were recorded with a scanning tunneling microscope. The movie tells the story of a boy and a wayward atom who meet and become friends. The film was accepted into the Tribeca Online Film Festival and shown at the New York Tech Meet-up and the World Science Festival.

Earlier in 2007 a book Teeny Ted from Turnip Town was created at the Simon Fraser University in Canada using a gallium-ion beam with a diameter of ~7 nanometers. The book contains 30 silicon-based pages sized by 0.07×0.10 mm; it was published in 100 copies and has an ISBN.

Between 2006 and 2014, Italian artists Alessandro Scali and Robin Goode, working in collaboration with the Department of Applied Science and Technology at the Polytechnic University of Turin, created a series of nanolithographic and microlithographic works etched on silicon wafers. These include Actual Size (2007), a representation of the African continent measuring 300×280 nm documented in Nature, and Key to Paradise (2007), a nanometric camel placed inside the eye of a needle, exhibited at the 3rd International Biennial of Contemporary Art of Seville (BIACS3, 2008) curated by Peter Weibel.

In 2015, Jonty Hurwitz pioneered a new technique for creating nanosculpture using multiphoton lithography and photogrammetry. His work Trust was prepared in collaboration with Karlsruhe Institute of Technology and set a Guinness World Record as the "Smallest Sculpture of a Human Form".
