= Walter Gekelman =

American plasma physicist

- Born: Walter N. Gekelman
- Education: Brooklyn College (B.S.); Stevens Institute of Technology (Ph.D.)
- Known for: Large Plasma Device
- Scientific career
- Fields: Plasma physics
- Institutions: UCLA
- Thesis: Optical Determination of the Ion and Electron Temperatures in a Barium Q Plasma (1972)

Walter N. Gekelman is an experimental plasma physicist and a professor emeritus at the University of California, Los Angeles (UCLA). He is known for the development and construction of the Large Plasma Device (LAPD), an over 20-meter long cylindrical plasma device to study fundamental plasma processes, such as Alfvén waves and magnetic flux ropes, under laboratory conditions. He is an elected fellow of the American Physical Society.

== Early life and career ==
Gekelman received a B.S. in physics from Brooklyn College in 1966 and a Ph.D. in experimental plasma physics at Stevens Institute of Technology in 1972.

Gekelman joined UCLA in 1974. In 1991, he constructed the original 10-meter-long LAPD to study Alfvén waves in plasmas and served as the director of the facility for 15 years until he was succeeded by Troy Carter in 2016. During his tenure as director, the LAPD was upgraded to a 20-meter long version in 2001 and became a designated national user facility for the study of basic plasma science, which garnered funding support from the National Science Foundation (NSF) and the US Department of Energy. He was also a member of the National Research Council (NRC) Plasma Science Committee and the NRC Burning Plasma Assessment Committee.

In 2015, Gekelman and UCLA engineer Patrick Pribyl received funding from the NSF GOALI program to research plasma processing technologies for the semiconductor industry, particularly for Lam Research, a semiconductor equipment manufacturing company.

== Scientific outreach ==
Gekelman was involved in scientific outreach for high school students. In 1993, he led the formation of the Los Angeles Teachers Alliance Group (LAPTAG) and established a plasma laboratory for high school students to conduct research that was subsequently published. The laboratory is a device similar in construct to the LAPD, but smaller.

In 2002, Gekelman was interviewed by Robyn Williams on his science talk show to discuss the LAPD. He also appeared in the Death Stars episode of Phil Plait's science TV documentary Bad Universe in 2010.

Gekelman also collaborates with UCLA's Art Sci Center as a scientist to deliver public lectures and create works of art inspired by plasma physics.

== Honors ==
In 1996, Gekelman was elected as a fellow to the American Physical Society for "a unique, original program of complete and definitive diagnostic studies of magnetic field reconnection and current disruptions in plasmas, achieving major advances and linking space and laboratory plasma physics".
