= Troy Carter (physicist) =

American plasma physicist

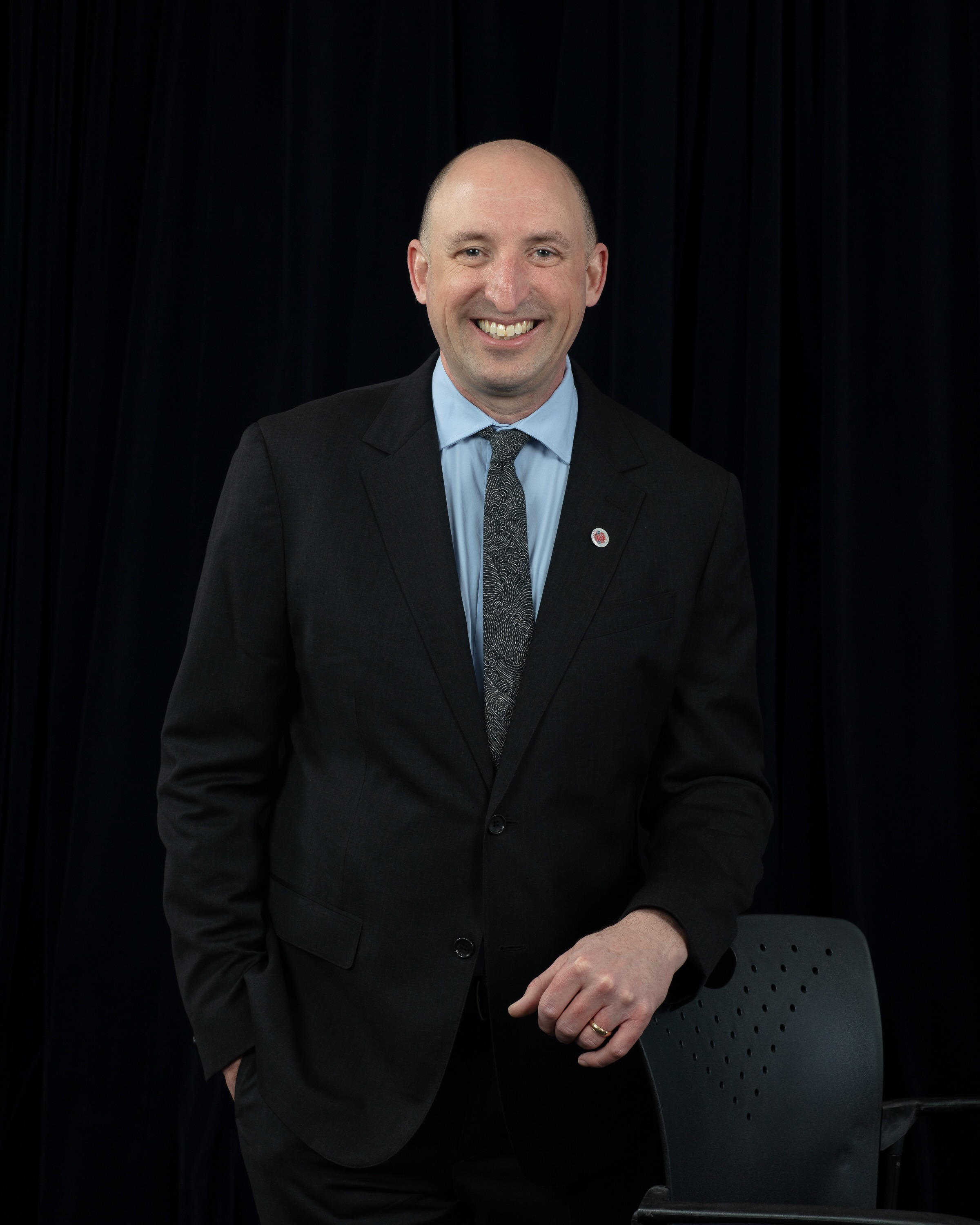
- Troy Carter in 2025
- Born: Troy Alan Carter; July 31, 1973 (age 53)
- Education: North Carolina State University (B.S., B.S.), Princeton University (M.A., Ph.D.)
- Awards: John Dawson Award (2002)
- Scientific career
- Fields: Plasma physics
- Workplaces: Oak Ridge National Laboratory; UCLA
- Thesis: Experimental Studies of Fluctuations In a Reconnecting Current Sheet (2001)
- Doctoral advisor: Masaaki Yamada; Russell Kulsrud

Troy Alan Carter (born July 31, 1973) is an American plasma physicist and the Director of Fusion Energy Division at Oak Ridge National Laboratory. He was formerly a professor at the University of California, Los Angeles. He was co-awarded the 2002 John Dawson Award for Excellence in Plasma Physics Research for his work on driven magnetic reconnection in a laboratory plasma.

== Early life and career ==
Carter received a Bachelor of Science (B.S.) in physics and a B.S. in nuclear engineering from North Carolina State University in 1995. He then received a Master of Arts and a Doctor of Philosophy in Astrophysical Sciences from Princeton University in 1997 and 2001 respectively, where he was supervised by Masaaki Yamada and Russell Kulsrud. Upon graduation, Carter was awarded a Fusion Energy Postdoctoral Fellowship from the US Department of Energy and pursued his postdoctoral work at UCLA.

In 2002, Carter became a faculty member at UCLA's department of physics and astronomy. He was an Assistant Professor until 2008 where he was promoted to Associate Professor, and was later promoted to full Professor in 2011. In 2016, he became the director of the Basic Plasma Science Facility and oversaw the renewal of the facility funding from the Department of Energy and the National Science Foundation. In 2017, he became a director of the Plasma Science and Technology Institute at UCLA. Carter led the DOE Fusion Energy Sciences Advisory Committee (FESAC) Subcommittee on Long Range Planning in 2020, resulting in the report "Powering the Future: Fusion and Plasmas" published in 2021. In 2024, Carter assumed the role of Director of Fusion Energy Division at Oak Ridge National Laboratory.

== Honors and awards ==
In 2002, Carter was jointly awarded the John Dawson Award for Excellence in Plasma Physics Research with Hantao Ji, Masaaki Yamada and Scott Hsu for "the experimental investigation of driven magnetic reconnection in a laboratory plasma. In this work, careful diagnostic studies of the current sheet structure, dynamics and associated wave activity provide a comprehensive picture of the reconnection process." In 2014, Carter was inducted as a fellow of the American Physical Society, with citation "For novel and impactful experimental research into fundamental processes relevant to laboratory, space and astrophysical plasmas including magnetic reconnection, wave-wave interactions, and turbulence and transport in magnetically-confined plasmas." In 2021, Carter was selected for the Fusion Power Associates Leadership award.

.
