= Sagaki Keita =

Japanese artist

Sagaki Keita is a Japanese artist who draws replicas of famous paintings composed of hundreds of tiny, whimsical cartoon characters.

As with many artists of his generation, Keita is influenced by Japanese manga and anime culture, which he integrates in his art. His knowledge of art history, both Japanese and European, has led him to dedicate various work cycles to main topics of art.

His work has been featured in shows around the world, including Japan, Hong Kong, Germany, Taiwan and Portugal.

Instead of working on a draft, Keita draws directly onto the final copy. His drawings often take months to create.

Keita was born in Ishikawa, Japan in 1984. He currently lives in Tokyo. He received an MFA from Fukushima University in 2008.

Keita's art has appeared in Walk The Line: The Art of Drawing, published in 2013. In March and April 2018, his work was showcased at Fabrik Gallery in Hong Kong, which featured his reinterpretations of works by Vermeer, Caravaggio, Rembrandt and Brueghel.

His most recent work cycle is named "Hystorical Portraits". Keita recreates iconic depictions of famous people, mainly of the 20th century, as drawings, and tells their biographic events, as well as the contemporary historical environment in the form of his signature whimsical characters.
