= Large Plasma Device =

Coordinates: 34.0607°N 118.4493°W

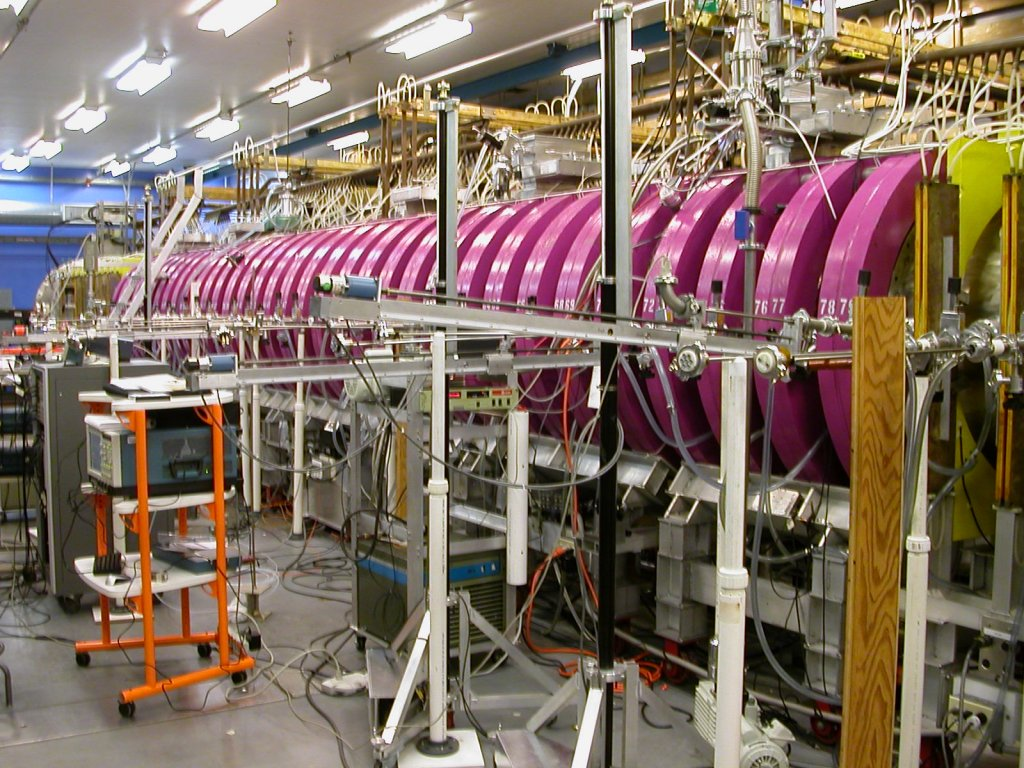
The Large Plasma Device during an experiment.

The Large Plasma Device (often stylized as LArge Plasma Device or LAPD) is an experimental physics device located at UCLA. It is designed as a general purpose laboratory for experimental plasma physics research. The device began operation in 1991 and was upgraded in 2001 to its current version. The modern LAPD is operated as the primary device for a national collaborative research facility, the Basic Plasma Science Facility (or BaPSF), which is supported by the US Department of Energy, Fusion Energy Sciences and the National Science Foundation. Half of the operation time of the device is available to scientists at other institutions and facilities who can compete for time through a yearly solicitation.

== History ==
The first version of the LAPD was a 10 meter long device constructed by a team led by Walter Gekelman in 1991. The construction took 3.5 years to complete and was funded by the Office of Naval Research (ONR). A major upgrade to a 20 meter version was funded by ONR and an NSF Major Research Instrumentation award in 1999. Following the completion of that major upgrade, the award of a $4.8 million grant by the US Department of Energy and the National Science Foundation in 2001 enabled the creation of the Basic Plasma Science Facility and the operation of the LAPD as part of this national user facility. Gekelman was director of the facility until 2016, when Troy Carter became BaPSF director.

== Machine overview ==
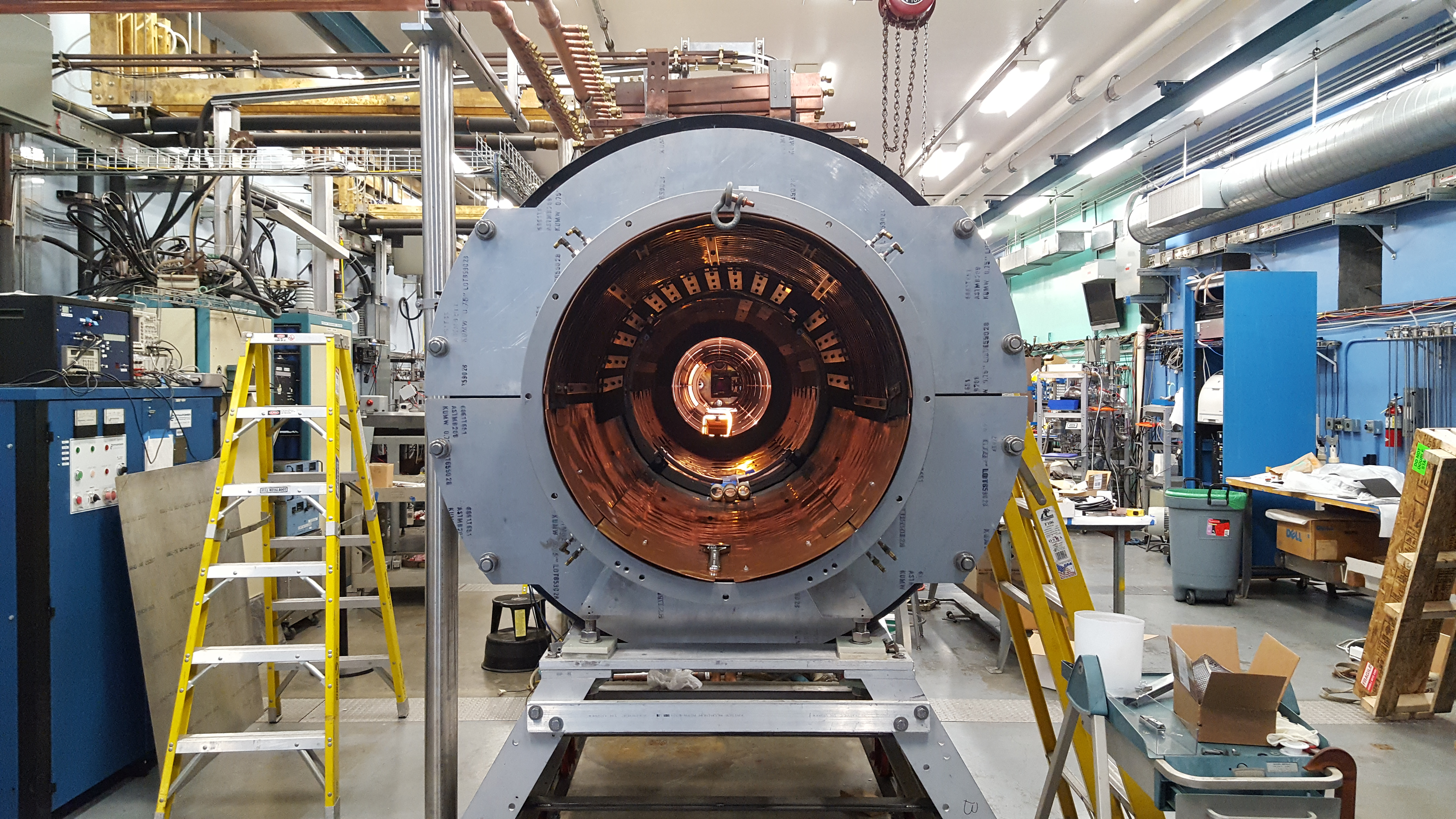
A view of the laboratory and the interior of the Large Plasma Device down the south end of the machine during its upgrade in January 2020.

The LAPD is a linear pulsed-discharge device operated at a high (1 Hz) repetition rate, producing a strongly magnetized background plasma which is physically large enough to support Alfvén waves. Plasma is produced from a barium oxide (BaO) cathode-anode discharge at one end of a 20-meter long, 1 meter diameter cylindrical vacuum vessel (diagram). The resulting plasma column is roughly 16.5 meters long and 60 cm in diameter. The background magnetic field, produced by a series of large electromagnets surrounding the chamber, can be varied from 400 gauss to 2.5 kilogauss (40 to 250 mT).

=== Plasma parameters ===
Because the LAPD is a general-purpose research device, the plasma parameters are carefully selected to make diagnostics simple without the problems associated with hotter (e.g. fusion-level) plasmas, while still providing a useful environment in which to do research. The typical operational parameters are:

- Density: n = 1–4 $\times$10^{12} cm^{−3}
- Temperature: T_{e} = 6 eV, T_{i} = 1 eV
- Background field: B = 400–2500 gauss (40–250 mT)

In principle, a plasma may be generated from any kind of gas, but inert gases are typically used to prevent the plasma from destroying the coating on the barium oxide cathode. Examples of gases used are helium, argon, nitrogen and neon. Hydrogen is sometimes used for short periods of time. Multiple gases can also be mixed in varying ratios within the chamber to produce multi-species plasmas.

At these parameters, the ion Larmor radius is a few millimeters, and the Debye length is tens of micrometres. Importantly, it also implies that the Alfvén wavelength is a few meters, and in fact shear Alfvén waves are routinely observed in the LAPD. This is the main reason for the 20-meter length of the device.

=== Plasma sources ===
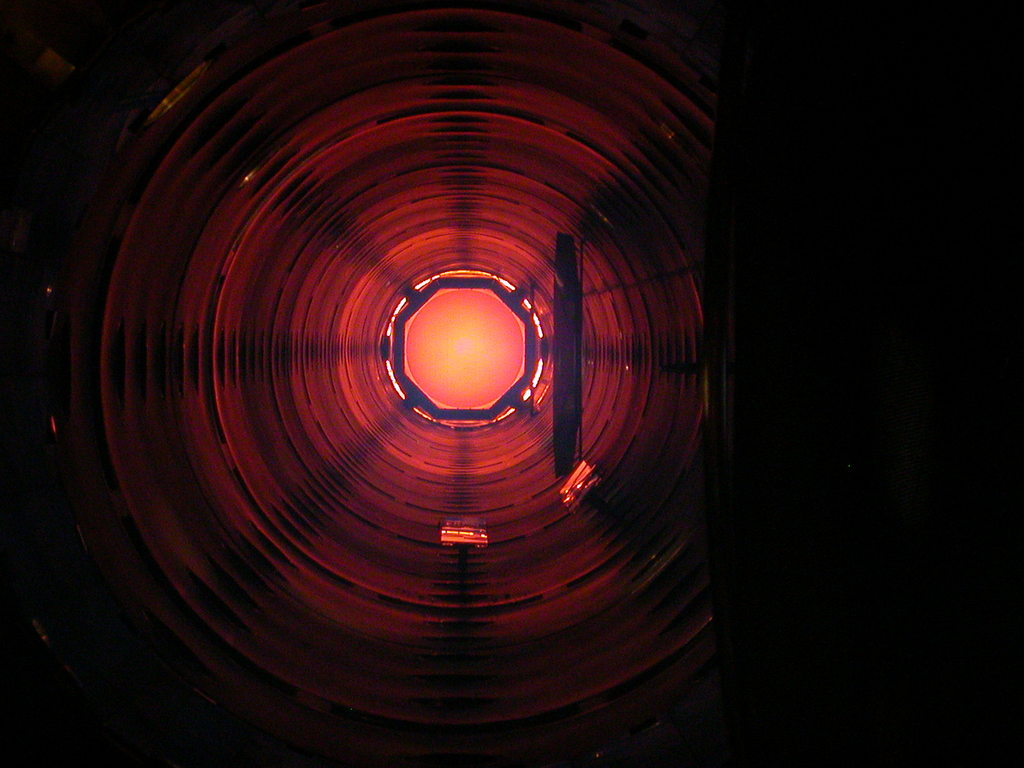
An interior view from an end port on the north end of the device showing a heated barium oxide cathode. The machine is under vacuum but the plasma discharge is turned off.

The main source of plasma within the LAPD is produced via discharge from the barium oxide (BaO) coated cathode, which emits electrons via thermionic emission. The cathode is located near the end of the LAPD and is made from a thin nickel sheet, uniformly heated to roughly 900 °C. The circuit is closed by a molybdenum mesh anode a short distance away. Typical discharge currents are in the range of 3-8 kiloamperes at 60-90 volts, supplied by a custom-designed transistor switch backed by a 4-farad capacitor bank.

A secondary cathode source made of lanthanum hexaboride (LaB_{6}) was developed in 2010 to provide a hotter and denser plasma when required. It consists of four square tiles joined to form a 20 $\times$20 cm^{2} area and is located at the other end of the LAPD. The circuit is also closed by a molybdenum mesh anode, which may be placed further down the machine, and is slightly smaller in size to the one used to close the BaO cathode source. The LaB_{6} cathode is typically heated to temperatures above 1750 °C by a graphite heater, and produces discharge currents of 2.2 kiloamperes at 150 volts.

The plasma in the LAPD is usually pulsed at 1 Hz, with the background BaO source on for 10-20 milliseconds at a time. If the LaB_{6} source is being utilized, it typically discharges together BaO cathode, but for a shorter period of time (about 5–8 ms) nearing the end of each discharge cycle. The use of an oxide-cathode plasma source, along with a well-designed transistor switch for the discharge, allows for a plasma environment which is extremely reproducible shot-to-shot.

One interesting aspect of the BaO plasma source is its ability to act as an "Alfvén Maser", a source of large-amplitude, coherent shear Alfvén waves. The resonant cavity is formed by the highly reflective nickel cathode and the semitransparent grid anode. Since the source is located at the end of the solenoid which generates the main LAPD background field, there is a gradient in the magnetic field within the cavity. As shear waves do not propagate above the ion cyclotron frequency, the practical effect of this is to act as a filter on the modes which may be excited. Maser activity occurs spontaneously at certain combinations of magnetic field strength and discharge current, and in practice may be activated (or avoided) by the machine user.

== Diagnostic access and probes ==
=== Probes ===
The main diagnostic is the movable probe. The relatively low electron temperature makes probe construction straightforward and does not require the use of exotic materials. Most probes are constructed in-house within the facility and include magnetic field probes, Langmuir probes, Mach probes (to measure flow), electric dipole probes and many others. Standard probe design also allows external users to bring their own diagnostics with them, if they desire. Each probe is inserted through its own vacuum interlock, which allows probes to be added and removed while the device is in operation.

A 1 Hz rep-rate, coupled with the high reproducibility of the background plasma, allows the rapid collection of enormous datasets. An experiment on LAPD is typically designed to be repeated once per second, for as many hours or days as is necessary to assemble a complete set of observations. This makes it possible to diagnose experiments using a small number of movable probes, in contrast to the large probe arrays used in many other devices.

The entire length of the device is fitted with "ball joints," vacuum-tight angular couplings (invented by a LAPD staff member) which allow probes to be inserted and rotated, both vertically and horizontally. In practice, these are used in conjunction with computer-controlled motorized probe drives to sample "planes" (vertical cross-sections) of the background plasma with whatever probe is desired. Since the only limitation on the amount of data to be taken (number of points in the plane) is the amount of time spent recording shots at 1 Hz, it is possible to assemble large volumetric datasets consisting of many planes at different axial locations.

Visualizations composed from such volumetric measurements can be seen at the LAPD gallery.

Including the ball joints, there are a total of 450 access ports on the machine, some of which are fitted with windows for optical or microwave observation.

=== Other diagnostics ===
A variety of other diagnostics are also available at the LAPD to complement probe measurements. These include photodiodes, microwave interferometers, a high speed camera (3 ns/frame) and laser-induced fluorescence.

== See also ==
- Enormous Toroidal Plasma Device (ETPD), a toroidal plasma device housed in the same facility as the LAPD
