= Takashi Ikegami =

Takashi Ikegami (born February 1961) is a professor at the University of Tokyo. He specializes in artificial life and complexity, and has been known to engage on the border between art and science.
