= Colossal (blog) =

Art and visual culture blog

- Website type: Blog, Art, Culture
- Owner: Christopher Jobson
- Website: thisiscolossal.com
- Launched: August 2010
- Current status: Active

Colossal is an art and visual culture blog founded by Chicago-based editor Christopher Jobson. The site covers topics ranging from art, design, and photography, to visual aspects of science and general creativity.

== History ==
Colossal is an art blog that features 15 to 25 posts per week on photography, design, animation, painting, installation art, architecture, drawing, and street art. It started as a personal blog in the fall of 2010. Web designer by trade, Jobson began his blog as one of one hundred things he wanted to accomplish in 2010. On March 9, 2011, Jobson posted artist Sagaki Keita's surreal, intricately detailed ink drawings to his blog. By 5:00 p.m. that day, so many visitors flooded the site that his server crashed. The blog grew in popularity to the point New York-based advertising agency Nectar Ads asked Colossal to be a part of an "art ad network" with site-specific content. This allowed Jobson to quit his job in 2013 and focus on the site full-time. Jobson explains the mission of Colossal, "I want Colossal to be a place where anyone, from any background, can discover art and aspects of visual culture that are interesting, fun, and approachable. To that end I shy away from criticism and interpretation and instead provide as many resources as possible for visitors to learn more on their own. I want to share art as it is, without justification."

== Recognition ==
Colossal has garnered a Utne Media Award for arts coverage, a Webby Award nomination, and was described as the "Tate Modern of the Internet" by Fast Company. The National Endowment for the Arts has called the website a "must read." American blogger Jason Kottke describes it as "a top-notch visual art/design blog," and PBS' Art:21 said the publication "brings recognition to under-represented (or even unrepresented) artists." In 2020 Jobson curated an exhibit Par Excellence Redux at the Elmhurst Art Museum.

Colossal was praised by American actor Neil Patrick Harris as "artistic, smart, and inspiring," and the publication was cited by the TED blog as one of "100 Websites You Should Know and Use" in 2013.
