= List of plasma physicists =

This is a list of physicists who have worked in or made notable contributions to the field of plasma physics.

Name	Known for	Recognition			
Félicie Albert	development and characterization of x-ray sources from laser-wakefield accelerators	Weimer Award (2017); APS Fellow (2019)			
Hannes Alfvén	magneto-hydrodynamics	Nobel Prize (1970)			
Radu Bălescu		Alfvén Prize (2000)			
Elena Belova	numerical contributions to the fundamental physics of magnetically confined plasmas	Weimer Award (2005); APS Fellow (2020)			
Emily Belli	simulations of transport and turbulence in strongly rotating plasmas	APS Fellow (2024)			
Willard Harrison Bennett	Z-pinch is a form of "Bennett pinch". Also invented radio frequency mass spectrometry.				
Ira B. Bernstein	fundamental theoretical contributions plasma physics including a wave mode in his name	Maxwell Prize (1982)			
Kristian Birkeland	First suggested that polar electric currents (or auroral electrojets) are connected to a system of filaments (now called "Birkeland currents") that flow along geomagnetic field lines into and away from the polar region.				
David Bohm	derived the Bohm sheath criterion, which states that a plasma must flow with at least the speed of sound toward a solid surface				
Jana Brotánková	COMPASS CASTOR tokamak, GOLEM tokamak				
Oscar Buneman	computational plasma physics and plasma simulation, Farley–Buneman instability				
Keith H. Burrell	established the links between sheared plasma flow and turbulent transport	Maxwell Prize (2018)			
Franklin Chang-Diaz	created the Variable Specific Impulse Magnetoplasma Rocket (VASIMR) concept, an electromagnetic thruster for spacecraft propulsion				
Nam Chang-hee	relativistic laser-matter interactions using femtosecond PW lasers	APS Fellow (2008)			
Sydney Chapman	developed kinetic theory of gases and applied it to study the magnetosphere				
Francis F. Chen	electrostatic probes, textbook	Maxwell Prize (1995)			
Liu Chen		John Dawson Prize (2004); Alfvén Prize (2008); Maxwell Prize (2012)			
Bruno Coppi	design of high field tokamaks	Maxwell Prize (1987)			
Sir Steven Cowley	astrophysical and turbulent plasmas				
William Crookes	vacuum tubes and the Crookes tube				
Ronald C. Davidson	one-component non-neutral plasmas	Maxwell Prize (2008)			
John M. Dawson	introduced the use of computer simulation to plasma physics	Maxwell Prize (1977)			
Peter Debye	Debye shielding and Debye length	Nobel Prize (1936)			
James F. Drake	theory of the fundamental mechanism of fast reconnection of magnetic fields in plasmas	Maxwell Prize (2010)			
Robert Ellis	co-led the Spheromak project				
Harold P. Eubank	magnetic fusion energy research	APS Fellow (1975)			
Philo Farnsworth	invention of the cathode-ray tube, television and Farnsworth-Hirsch Fusor				
Nathaniel Fisch	theoretical development of efficient rf-driven current in plasmas	Maxwell Prize (2005); Alfvén Prize (2015)			
Edward A. Frieman	theory of magnetically confined plasmas, including fundamental work on the formulation of the MHD Energy Principle	Maxwell Prize (2002)			
Harold Fürth	resistive instabilities	Maxwell Prize (1983)			
Vitaly Ginzburg	theory of electromagnetic wave propagation in plasmas				
Valery Godyak	fundamental contributions to the physics of low temperature plasmas	Maxwell Prize (2004)			
Robert J. Goldston	empirical scaling relationship for the confinement of energy in tokamak plasmas	APS Fellow (1987)			
Melvin Gottlieb	responsible for building Princeton Large Torus and Tokamak Fusion Test Reactor at PPPL				
Roy W. Gould	beam-plasma interactions	Maxwell Prize (1994)			
Harold Grad	theoretical contributions to magnetohydrodynamics	Maxwell Prize (1986)			
John M. Greene	contributions to theory of magnetohydrodynamic equilibria and ideal and resistive instabilities	Maxwell Prize (1992)			
Hans R. Griem	contributions to plasma spectroscopy and spectral line broadening in plasmas	Maxwell Prize (1991)			
Akira Hasegawa	theories of nonlinear drift wave turbulence, including the Hasegawa-Mima equation	Maxwell Prize (2000); Alfvén Prize (2011)			
Noah Hershkowitz	fundamental contributions to the physics of low temperature plasmas	Maxwell Prize (2004)			
Laura Berzak Hopkins	hohlraum design for inertial confinement fusion	APS Fellow (2025)			
Ratko Janev	nuclear processes in low-temperature plasmas	Macedonian Academy of Sciences and Arts			
Allison Jaynes	interaction of solar plasma with the Earth's magnetosphere and radiation belts	Weimer Award (2023)			
Li Jiangang	HT-7 tokomak	Chinese Academy of Engineering			
Maria Gatu Johnson	inertial fusion science stellar nucleosynthesis	Weimer Award (2019); APS Fellow (2023)			
Chandrashekhar J. Joshi	application of plasma concepts to high energy electron and positron acceleration	Maxwell Prize (2006); Alfvén Prize (2023)			
Boris B. Kadomtsev	early plasma turbulence theory, stability and nonlinear theory of MHD and kinetic instabilities	Maxwell Prize (1998)			
Predhiman Krishan Kaw	founding director of Institute for Plasma Research				
Charles F. Kennel	fundamental contributions to the basic plasma physics of collisionless shocks	Maxwell Prize (1997)			
Donald W. Kerst	invention of the levitated toroidal multipole	Maxwell Prize (1984)			
Shaukat Hameed Khan	laser isotope separation, Chief Science Officer of the Pakistan Atomic Energy Commission (1969-2005)				
Craig Kletzing	studies of Alfven waves and aurorae	APS Fellow (2022)			
Andrea Kritcher	hohlraum design, first laboratory burning and igniting fusion plasma	APS Fellow (2022)			
William L. Kruer	theoretical and experimental understanding of intense electromagnetic waves with plasmas	Maxwell Prize (1990)			
Russell M. Kulsrud	plasma theory including magnetic reconnection	Maxwell Prize (1993)			
Lev Landau	Landau damping	Nobel Prize (1962)			
Irving Langmuir	coined the term "plasma" to hint at the lifelike behavior of this state of matter. Developed electron temperature concepts and an electrostatic probe, the Langmuir probe.	Nobel Prize (1932)			
Mounir Laroussi	Plasma pencil, biomedical applications of low temperature plasma, plasma medicine	APS Fellow (2023)			
Eric Lerner	focus fusion and plasma cosmology				
John Lindl	contributions in high energy density physics and inertial confinement fusion research	Maxwell Prize (2007)			
Yu Lin	computational research in nonlinear physics in the boundary layers of space plasmas	Weimer Award (2002)			
John H. Malmberg	experimental demonstration of Landau damping and development of pure electron plasmas	Maxwell Prize (1985)			
A A Mamun	nonlinear dynamics of dusty plasma physics	Friedrich Wilhelm Bessel Research Award (2009)			
William H. Matthaeus	turbulence in space and astrophysical plasmas	Maxwell Prize (2019)			
Saskia Mordijck	particle transport in tokamaks	APS Fellow (2025)			
Gregor Eugen Morfill	plasma crystals as a solid state of aggregation of dusty plasmas	Maxwell Prize (2011)			
Warren Bicknell Mori	theory and kinetic simulations of nonlinear processes in plasma-based acceleration	Maxwell Prize (2020)			
Forrest S. Mozer	electric field measurements in space plasma	APS Fellow (1977)			
Ghulam Murtaza	theory of ionized plasmas				
John Nuckolls	introduced the inertial confinement approach to fusion	Maxwell Prize (1981)			
Thomas M. O'Neil	plasma theory, including extension of Landau damping to the nonlinear regime	Maxwell Prize (1996)			
Tihiro Ohkawa	developed the doublet approach for toroidal confinement fusion	Maxwell Prize (1979)			
Eugene N. Parker	plasma astrophysics, including predicting the solar wind, explaining the solar dynamo, and formulating the theory of magnetic reconnection	Maxwell Prize (2003); Alfvén Prize (2012)			
Friedrich Paschen	Paschen's law, an equation relating the breakdown voltage to the gas pressure and electrode gap length				
Anthony Peratt	influential advocate of plasma cosmology		Yuan Ping	inertial confinement fusion, Raman amplification of lasers in plasma	Weimer Award (2011); APS Fellow (2015)
Maxim G. Ponomarev	pioneering investigations of disturbances of all plasma species by modeling charged particle emissions from imaginary and additional sources:. Imaginary-emission method for modeling disturbances of all magnetoplasma species: Reflecting and absorbing objects in motion through a rarefied plasma at different angles to the ambient magnetic field (Phys. Rev. E 54, 5591 – Published 1 November 1996)				
Miklos Porkolab	linear and nonlinear plasma waves and wave-particle interactions	Maxwell Prize (2009); Alfvén Prize (2013)			
Richard F. Post	developed the magnetic mirror concept for magnetic confinement fusion	Maxwell Prize (1978)			
Annick Pouquet	energy transfer in magneto-fluid turbulence	Alfvén Prize (2020)			
Ksenia Aleksandrovna Razumova	stable plasmas in tokamaks, experimental measurement of plasma energy	Alfvén Prize (2017)			
Caterina Riconda	laser-plasma interactions	APS Fellow (2023)			
Marshall Rosenbluth	fundamental theoretical contributions plasma physics, and in particular, plasma instabilities	Maxwell Prize (1976); Alfvén Prize (2002)			
Norman Rostoker	statistical mechanics of particles with Coulomb interactions	Maxwell Prize (1988)			
Subrata Roy	Wingless Electromagnetic Air Vehicle and serpentine geometry plasma actuator				
Dmitri Ryutov	theory of low and high energy density plasmas	Maxwell Prize (2017)			
Roald Sagdeev	theory of collisionless shocks and stochastic magnetic fields	Maxwell Prize (2001)			
Meghnad Saha	Saha ionization equation				
Andrey Dmitriyevich Sakharov	proposed development of tokamaks				
Rudolf Seeliger	electric discharges in gases and plasma physics				
Vitaly Shafranov	Grad–Shafranov equation, Kruskal–Shafranov instability)	Alfvén Prize (2001)			
Lyman Spitzer	Spitzer resistivity, Project Matterhorn	Maxwell Prize (1975)			
Phillip A. Sprangle	high intensity laser interactions with plasmas	Maxwell Prize (2013)			
Thomas H. Stix	doublet approach for toroidal confinement fusion	Maxwell Prize (1980)			
Ravindra Sudan	generation and propagation of intense ion beams	Maxwell Prize (1989)			
Linda Sugiyama	developer of numerical simulations for plasma physics	APS Fellow (2004)			
Clifford Surko	invention of and development of techniques to accumulate, confine, and utilize positron plasmas	Maxwell Prize (2014)			
John Bryan Taylor	helicity conservation, bootstrap current, ballooning transformation, plasma theory	Maxwell Prize (1999); Alfvén Prize (2004)			
Weichao Tu	dynamics of charged particles and plasma in the Van Allen radiation belt	Weimer Award (2021)			
Anatoly Vlasov	Vlasov equation models plasma with long-range interaction between particles				
Friedrich Wagner	discovery of H-mode in ASDEX in 1984	Alfvén Prize (2007)			
Katherine Weimer	plasma magnetohydrodynamic equilibrium and stability theory				
Anne E. White	turbulent transport in tokamaks	Weimer Award (2014)			
Masaaki Yamada	experimental studies of magnetic reconnection relevant to space, astrophysical and fusion plasmas	Maxwell Prize (2015)			
Lin Yin	laser-plasma interactions	Weimer Award (2008)			
Ellen G. Zweibel	energetics, stability, and dynamics of astrophysical plasmas	Maxwell Prize (2016)			
