= Amitava Bhattacharjee =

Amitava Bhattacharjee may refer to:

- Amitava Bhattacharjee (physicist), theoretical plasma physicist
- Amitabh Bhattacharjee (born 1973), Indian actor
- Amitabh Bhattacharya (born 1976), Indian lyricist and playback singer

== See also ==
- Bhattacharya (surname)
