= Morfill =

Morfill is a surname. Notable people with the surname include:

- Gregor Morfill (born 1945), German physicist
- William Morfill (1834–1909), first professor of Russian in the UK
