= Hantao Ji =

Physics professor

- Awards: John Dawson Award (2002) John Dawson Award (2025)
- Scientific career
- Fields: Plasma physics
- Institutions: Princeton University; Princeton Plasma Physics Laboratory
- Website: w3.pppl.gov/~hji

Hantao Ji is a professor of astrophysical sciences at Princeton University. He received the John Dawson Award in 2002 for his work on magnetic reconnection and in 2025 for his work on magneto-rotational instability. He is also a fellow of the American Physical Society.
