= Liu Chen (physicist) =

Taiwanese-American physicist

- 陳騮
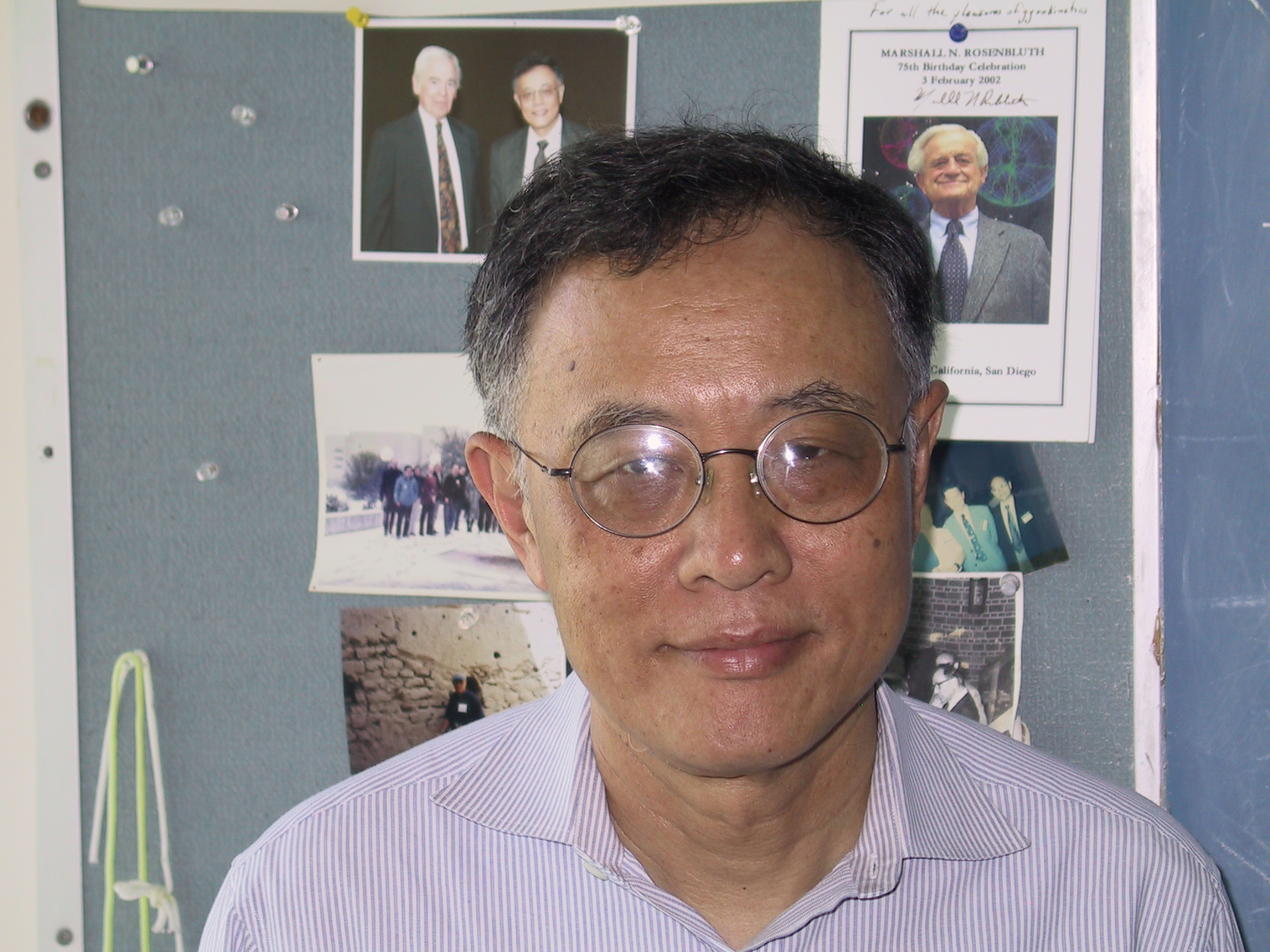
- Chen at UCI in 2004
- Born: February 4, 1946 (age 80); Hangzhou, Zhejiang, China
- Citizenship: Republic of China; United States
- Education: National Taiwan University (BS); Washington State University, Pullman (MS); University of California, Berkeley (PhD)
- Spouse: Shingshah Lee (李醒夏) (m. 1969)
- Children: 1
- Awards: John Dawson Award (2004); Hannes Alfvén Prize (2008); James Clerk Maxwell Prize for Plasma Physics (2012); Subramanyan Chandrasekhar Prize of Plasma Physics (2019)
- Scientific career
- Fields: Plasma physics
- Workplaces: Bell Labs; Princeton University; University of California, Irvine; Zhejiang University
- Thesis: I. Heating of Magnetized Plasmas by Large-Amplitude Electric Field. II. Reduction of the Grid Effects in Simulation Plasmas (1972)
- Doctoral advisor: Charles K. Birdsall
- Website: www.faculty.uci.edu/profile.cfm?faculty_id=2034

Liu Chen (simplified Chinese: 陈骝; traditional Chinese: 陳騮; pinyin: Chén Liú; born February 4, 1946) is a Taiwanese-American theoretical physicist who has made original contributions to many aspects of plasma physics. He is known for the discoveries of kinetic Alfven waves, toroidal Alfven eigenmodes, and energetic particle modes; the theories of geomagnetic pulsations, Alfven wave heating, and fishbone oscillations, and the first formulation of nonlinear gyrokinetic equations. Chen retired from University of California, Irvine (UCI) in 2012, assuming the title professor emeritus of physics and astronomy.

== Early life and education ==
Chen was born in 1946 in Hangzhou, China, to a family whose ancestral home is in Yuyao. Chen's ancestral family name is Huang (黃). He is a descendant of the philosopher Zongxi Huang (黃宗羲). His great-grandfather, Cheng-yi Huang (黃承乙) was the mayor of Taiwan County (now Taichung City) during the Qing reign of the Guangxu Emperor.

In 1950, after the Kuomintang defeat in the Chinese Civil War, Chen left mainland China during the Great Retreat with his mother, Shyue Yan King Chen (金學言; 1916–2006), and three siblings. They joined his father, Lee Chen (陳禮; 1913–2003), at the Tiu Keng Leng refugee camp in Hong Kong, where he began his education. The Chen family then moved to Taiwan in 1951.

After graduating from the Affiliated Senior High School of National Taiwan Normal University in 1962, Chen attended National Taiwan University, earning his bachelor's degree in 1966. He then left Taiwan in 1967 to complete graduate studies in the United States. He earned a Master of Science (M.S.) from Washington State University, Pullman, in 1969, and his Ph.D. from the University of California, Berkeley, in 1972. His doctoral dissertation, completed under Charles K. Birdsall, was titled, "I. Heating of Magnetized Plasmas by Large-Amplitude Electric Field. II. Reduction of the Grid Effects in Simulation Plasmas."

== Academic career ==
From 1972 to 1974, Chen did his postdoctoral research with Akira Hasegawa at the Bell Labs. They developed a theory for long-period magnetic pulsations in the magnetosphere based on resonant coupling between hydromagnetic compressional waves and transverse Alfvén continuous spectrum. This theory, later referred to as Chen-Hasegawa field-line-resonance model, successfully explained the observations in the Earth's magnetosphere by Louis J. Lanzerotti, and has become the standard model for magnetic pulsations in the Earth's and other planetary magnetospheres. Soon, their focus turned to the charged particle heating via resonant absorption within Alfvén wave continuous spectrum. They discovered the Kinetic Alfvén wave, which resolves the logarithmic singularity of magnetohydrodynamic shear Alfvén waves and plays important roles in the heating, acceleration and transport of charged particles in solar, magnetospheric, and laboratory plasmas.

From 1974, Chen worked for 19 years at Princeton Plasma Physics Laboratory (PPPL) and Princeton University, there his interest was directed to the study of fusion plasmas. He, in collaboration with Edward A. Frieman, formulated and derived the first nonlinear gyrokinetic equation, the Frieman-Chen equation named in their honor, which has played a fundamental role in the physics understanding of strongly magnetized plasmas in the last decades. With Chio-Zong Cheng and Morrell S. Chance, Chen predicted the existence of hydromagnetic Alfvén bound states in laboratory plasmas due to realistic symmetry-breaking equilibrium conditions. These hydromagnetic Alfvén bound states were later observed in worldwide plasma experimental devices. Chen is also well known for his collaboration with Roscoe White and Marshall Rosenbluth in demonstrating theoretically that supra-thermal energetic particles can spontaneously excite in laboratory plasmas a unique macroscopic hydromagnetic wave, observed experimentally as “fishbones” from the magnetic signals. From 1986 until 1993, Chen served as the deputy head of the Theory Department at PPPL.

In 1993, Chen became a professor of Department of Physics & Astronomy at the University of California, Irvine (UCI). During this period, Chen discovered the existence of energetic-particle modes within the shear Alfvén wave continuous spectrum and introduced a unified theoretical framework to understand the distinctive features of different Alfvén bound states and energetic-particle continuum modes. Subsequently, in the past two decades, this theory was generalized by a series of papers written jointly with Fulvio Zonca, and named as the general fishbone-like dispersion relation. In 2000, Chen and coworkers elucidated that drift wave turbulence can spontaneously generate coherent zonal flows via intensity-modulation interactions, resulting in turbulence self-regulation. This nonlinear process has a broad scope of applications and has been generalized to the zonal structures in charged particle phase space. Chen retired from UCI in 2012.

Chen visited mainland China in 1975 for the first time after the normalization of US-China relationship. Chen has, throughout the years, played active roles in the development of plasma physics research as well as training next generation of plasma physicists both in mainland China and Taiwan. In 1985, Chen helped Shih-Tung Tsai and Changxuan Yu to establish the Chinese Summer School for Plasma Physics. In 2007, Chen initiated the Cross-Strait Symposium on the Fusion Energy and Plasma Science. Chen served, from 1997 to 2016, as the Founding Chairman of Foundation of Shih-Tung Tsai Award for Plasma Physics. Chen was appointed as an Honorary Research Professor at Institute of Physics, Chinese Academy of Sciences, Beijing, in 1990, Visiting Kuang-Piu Chair Professor at Zhejiang University, Hangzhou, in 2004, and Visiting Kuo-Ting Chair Professor at National Central University, Zhongli, Taiwan, in 2007. From 2006 to 2016, Chen served as the founding director of the Institute for Fusion Theory and Simulation (IFTS) at Zhejiang University. In 2016, Chen became the director emeritus.

Chen has also published a graduate textbook Waves and Instabilities in Plasmas (World Scientific Publication Co., 1987), and nurtured generations of graduate students and postdocs worldwide.

== Personal life ==
Chen married to Shingshah Lee (李醒夏) in August 1969. They have one son, Chen Pei-jin (陳培進).

== Honors and awards ==
- 1981, Fellow, American Physical Society
- 2004, John Dawson Award for Excellence in Plasma Physics Research, from the American Physical Society
- 2008, Hannes Alfvén Prize, from the European Physical Society
- 2009, Fellow, American Association for Advancement of Sciences
- 2011, Fellow, American Geophysical Union
- 2012, James Clerk Maxwell Prize for Plasma Physics, from the American Physical Society
- 2019, Subrahmanyan Chandresekhar Prize, from the Association of Asia Pacific Physical Societies
- 2022, Academician, Academia Sinica
- 2023, Yushan Fellow, Ministry of Education, ROC
- 2026, Distinguished Alumnus of National Taiwan University
