= Noah Hershkowitz =

American experimental plasma physicist (1941–2020)

- Born: August 16, 1941; New York City, New York
- Died: November 13, 2020 (aged 79); Madison, Wisconsin
- Education: Union College (B.S.); Johns Hopkins University (Ph.D.)
- Awards: James Clerk Maxwell Prize for Plasma Physics (2004); IEEE Marie Sklodowska-Curie Award (2015)
- Scientific career
- Fields: Plasma physics
- Thesis: Mössbauer Effect of the Second Excited State of Fe^{57}. (1966)
- Doctoral advisor: James Calvin Walker

Noah Hershkowitz (August 16, 1941 – November 13, 2020) was an American experimental plasma physicist. He was known for his pioneering research on the understanding of plasma sheaths, solitons and double layers in plasmas, as well as the development of the emissive probe which measures the plasma potential (i.e. the electric potential within a plasma sheath).

In 2004, Hershkowitz was co-awarded the 2004 James Clerk Maxwell Prize for Plasma Physics for his contributions to the field of low-temperature plasmas. He was also awarded the 2015 IEEE Marie Sklodowska-Curie Award for his research and education of basic and applied plasma science.

== Early life and career ==
Hershkowitz obtained a bachelor's degree from Union College in 1962 and a Ph.D. in physics from Johns Hopkins University in 1966. Upon graduation, Hershkowitz remained at the university to become an instructor in physics until 1967, where he was employed as assistant professor at the University of Iowa until 1980. During this time between 1974 and 1975, he was a visiting professor at the University of California, Los Angeles. Between 1980 and 1981, he was a visiting professor at the University of Colorado, Boulder. In 1981, he became a professor at the University of Wisconsin-Madison, and was the Irving Langmuir Professor of Engineering Physics.

In 1992, Hershkowitz founded the journal Plasma Sources Science and Technology as the editor-in-chief.

== Scientific contributions ==
Hershkowitz' work on low temperature plasmas included radio frequency wave heating, sheath physics, potential profiles, diagnostic probes and the industrial applications of plasmas.

Hershkowitz became director of the Phaedrus Tandem Mirror experiment at the University of Wisconsin-Madison in 1980. The group made contributions in demonstrating the stability of RF (radio frequency) heating in magnetic confinement devices.

His work also has applications in magnetic confinement fusion (e.g. tokamaks, magnetic mirrors).

== Honors and awards ==
Hershkowitz has been a fellow of the American Physical Society and the IEEE since 1981.

In 2004, Hershkowitz was jointly awarded the James Clerk Maxwell Prize for Plasma Physics with Valery Godyak for his research on low-temperature plasmas. That same year he received the Plasma Prize of the American Vacuum Society. In 2015, he received the IEEE Marie Sklodowska-Curie Award for "innovative research and inspiring education in basic and applied plasma science".
