= Amitava Bhattacharjee (physicist) =

Plasma physicist

- Education: Princeton University (Ph.D.)
- Awards: James Clerk Maxwell Prize for Plasma Physics (2022)
- Scientific career
- Fields: Plasma physics
- Institutions: Columbia University; University of Iowa; University of New Hampshire; Princeton Plasma Physics Laboratory
- Website: PPPL Theory Department - Amitava Bhattacharjee

Amitava Bhattacharjee is a theoretical plasma physicist and a professor at Princeton University. He was awarded the 2022 James Clerk Maxwell Prize for Plasma Physics for his work on dusty plasmas and fundamental plasma processes such as magnetic reconnection, magnetohydrodynamic turbulence and dynamo actions, as well as his contributions in connecting laboratory plasmas to astrophysical plasmas.
