= Dmitri Ryutov =

Russian theoretical plasma physicist

Dmitri Dmitriyevich Ryutov
- Дми́трий Дми́триевич Рю́тов
- Born: March 6, 1940 (age 86); Moscow, USSR
- Education: Moscow Institute of Physics and Technology (M.S.); Kurchatov Institute (Ph.D.)
- Scientific career
- Fields: Plasma physics
- Thesis: (1966)
- Website: pls.llnl.gov/people/staff-bios/physics/ryutov-d

Dmitri Dmitriyevich Ryutov (Russian: Дми́трий Дми́триевич Рю́тов; born March 6, 1940, in Moscow) is a Russian theoretical plasma physicist.

== Early life and career ==
Ryutov graduated from the Moscow Institute of Physics and Technology in 1962 and from the Kurchatov Institute in 1965, where he received his doctorate in plasma theory in 1966. From 1968 to 1997, he was at the Budker Institute of Nuclear Physics in Novosibirsk, where he expanded the fusion research program from 1979 and was promoted from deputy director to chief scientist in 1994. He was also a professor of plasma physics at the Novosibirsk State University. From 1994, he was a senior visiting scientist at the Lawrence Livermore National Laboratory (LLNL), where he became a Distinguished Member of the Technical Staff in 2012. Ryutov retired from LLNL in 2016.

Among other things, he dealt with mirror machines (including having proposed the Gas Dynamic Trap (GDT) in Novosibirsk), Tokamak divertors, particle beams with high energy density, the Z-Pinch, solar and space physics, laboratory astrophysics, X-ray optics and magnetic levitation. He was involved in the experimental magnetic levitation system Inductrack, the Snowflake Divertor for tokamaks and X-ray diagnostics at Linac Coherent Light Source.

== Honors and awards ==
Ryutov has been a corresponding member of the Russian Academy of Sciences since 1976 and a full member since 1992. He became a Fellow of the American Physical Society in 1998 and the Institute of Physics in 2004. He became an Edward Teller Fellow of the LLNL in 2007 and received the Distinguished Career Award from Fusion Power Associates in 2010.

In 2017, he received the James Clerk Maxwell Prize for Plasma Physics for "many outstanding contributions to the theoretical plasma physics of low and high energy density plasmas, open and closed magnetic configurations, and laboratory and astrophysical systems".

In 2020, Ryutov, with 10 other researchers from different institutions, jointly received the John Dawson Award for Excellence in Plasma Physics Research for the generation of Weibel-mediated collisionless shocks in laboratory plasma experiments. He was part of a team that studied and observed Weibel-mediated collisionless shocks at the National Ignition Facility of LLNL.

== Other publications ==
- Ryutov, D. D. (1999). "Landau damping: half a century with the great discovery". Plasma Physics and Controlled Fusion. 41 (3A): A1–A12. Bibcode:1999PPCF...41A...1R. doi:10.1088/0741-3335/41/3a/001. ISSN 0741-3335. S2CID 250810726.
- Ryutov, D. D. (2002). "On drift instabilities in magnetized target fusion devices". Physics of Plasmas. 9 (9): 4085–4088. Bibcode:2002PhPl....9.4085R. doi:10.1063/1.1496508. ISSN 1070-664X.
