= Valery Godyak =

American physicist

- Валерий Годяк
- Born: June 8, 1941 (age 84); Czernowitz, Ukrainian SSR
- Education: Leningrad Technical University (M.S.); Lomonosov University (Ph.D.)
- Awards: James Clerk Maxwell Prize for Plasma Physics (2004)
- Scientific career
- Fields: Plasma physics
- Thesis: (1968)

Valery Antonovich Godyak (born June 8, 1941 in Czernowitz) is a Russian-American physicist who specializes in plasma physics. As a scientist, he made fundamental contributions to the understanding of radio frequency (RF) induced discharges in plasmas as well as in associated nonlinear phenomena. As an industrial physicist, he developed induction lamps such as the Icetron-Endura RF lamp and received honors from companies such as Osram Sylvania and Siemens.

== Early life and career ==
Godyak received his Engineer-Physicist degree from Leningrad Technical University in 1964. In the same year, he became an assistant professor at Ryazan Radiotechnological University. In 1968, he received his Ph.D. in Plasma Physics at the Lomonosov University in Moscow. He then worked at the Laboratory of Fusion Engineering at the State Institute of Electro-Physical Apparatus in Leningrad, where he was involved in relativistic electron beams, electron optics and accelerator physics. In 1972, he joined Lomonosov University as a group leader for gas discharges with radio waves.

In 1980, he was dismissed on political grounds and worked in auxiliaries, for example as an elevator electrician in a Moscow hospital. In 1984, he joined the United States and became a scientist with the GTE Corporation (a follower of the Bell Telephone Company), following the 1993 takeover of the Lamp Party by Osram at Osram Sylvania.

== Honors and awards ==
Godyak is a fellow of the American Physical Society and the IEEE.

In 2004, he received the James Clerk Maxwell Prize for Plasma Physics with Noah Hershkowitz for "fundamental contributions to the physics of low temperature plasmas, including radio frequency wave heating, sheath physics, potential profiles, diagnostic probes, and the industrial applications of plasmas".

== Books ==
- Godyak, Valery A. (1986). Soviet radio frequency discharge research. Delphic Associates. OCLC 714769732.
