= Keith Burrell =

American plasma physicist

Keith Howard Burrell
- Born: April 13, 1947 (age 78); Santa Monica, California
- Education: Stanford University (B.S.); California Institute of Technology (M.S., Ph.D.)
- Awards: John Dawson Award (2001); James Clerk Maxwell Prize for Plasma Physics (2018)
- Scientific career
- Fields: Plasma physics
- Thesis: (1975)

Keith Howard Burrell (born April 13, 1947 in Santa Monica, California) is an American plasma physicist.

== Early life and career ==
Burrell received bachelor's degree in physics from Stanford University in 1968. He then received a master's degree and a Ph.D. in physics from Caltech in 1970 and 1975 respectively. He then worked at General Atomics in fusion research with tokamaks, in particular DIII-D tokamak from General Atomics. Before that, he did research at the ISX-A and ISA-B Tokamak of the Oak Ridge National Laboratory.

He played an important role in the study of the H-mode (i.e. high-confinement mode) discovered in 1982 at the ASDEX tokamak in magnetically enclosed fusion plasmas and the underlying transport mechanisms, in particular the suppression of turbulence by the formation of shear currents. Burrell was involved in the discovery of quiet H-mode (quiescent H-mode) at DIII-D in 1999, which has the advantages of H-modes but no edge instabilities (edge localized modes, ELM). Burrell also developed methods for plasma diagnostics.

== Honors and awards ==
Burrell is a fellow of the American Physical Society (1985) and the Institute of Physics.

In 2001, Burrell received the Excellence in Plasma Physics Award (now known as the John Dawson Award for Excellence in Plasma Physics Research) from the American Physical Society for "experiments that show that sheared ExB flows can suppress turbulence and transport in tokamak plasmas and that such flows can spontaneously arise at the edge and in the core of tokamak plasmas.".

In 2018, he received the James Clerk Maxwell Prize for Plasma Physics for "pioneering research, including key experimental advances and diagnostic development, that established the links between sheared plasma flow and turbulent transport, leading to improved confinement regimes for magnetized plasmas through turbulent transport reduction by sheared flow".
