= Linda Sugiyama =

American plasma physicist

Linda Ellen Sugiyama
- Born: American
- Occupation: American plasma physicist
- Known for: Fellow of the American Physical Society (APS)
- Notable work: Plasma Science And The Environment (American Institute of Physics, 1997)

Linda Ellen Sugiyama is an American plasma physicist, a research affiliate in the High Energy Plasma Physics Group of the Laboratory for Nuclear Science at the Massachusetts Institute of Technology, where she earned her PhD in 1980 under the joint supervision of Chia-Chiao Lin and Bruno Coppi.

Sugiyama's research has included the development of computer simulations to model the effects of breakdowns of plasma confinement in tokamaks, and to model plasma density snakes, a common type of instability in confined plasma. With Wallace Manheimer and Thomas H. Stix, she is co-editor of the book Plasma Science And The Environment (American Institute of Physics, 1997), on the applications of plasma in environmental engineering.

Sugiyama was named a Fellow of the American Physical Society (APS) in 2004, after a nomination from the APS Division of Plasma Physics, "for contributions to the development of numerical simulation for the study of basic questions in plasma physics and the inter-relationship between the numerical and analytical approaches to plasma theory".
