= James Clerk Maxwell Prize for Plasma Physics =

The James Clerk Maxwell Prize for Plasma Physics is an annual American Physical Society (APS) award that is given in recognition of outstanding contributions to the field of plasma physics. It was established in 1975 by Maxwell Technologies, in honor of the Scottish physicist James Clerk Maxwell. It is currently sponsored by General Atomics. The prize includes a $10,000 USD monetary award and recognition at the annual American Physical Society Division of Plasma Physics conference.

== Recipients ==
Year	Recipient	Country of Birth	Rationale	Reference
1975	Lyman Spitzer	United States	"For his pioneering investigations of the behavior of plasma and guiding and inspiring a generation of plasma physicists through his research and leadership in the controlled thermonuclear program."	
1976	Marshall Nicholas Rosenbluth	United States	"For his pioneering analyses of the behavior of plasma in its various manifestations. His wide ranging work has had a strong impact on important facets of plasma theory, particularly stability but also including transport processes, interactions of radiation with plasma, fluctuations, wave phenomena, and other fundamental processes."	
1977	John M. Dawson	United States	"For his outstanding contributions to plasma physics and controlled fusion as both as innovative theorist and a prolific inventor, whose ideas have provided the basis for several current fusion configurations. He initiated the use of computer simulation as a new and powerful tool for the study of plasmas. He inspired and trained a cadre of younger theorists to continue the development of the field he initiated."	
1978	Richard F. Post	United States	"For many original contributions to both fundamental plasma physics and the design of Fusion Reactors. In particular for his unswerving dedication to all aspects of the study of magnetic mirror plasma confinement."	
1979	Tihiro Ohkawa	Japan	"For his development of multi-current or doublet approach to the design of tokamaks with non-circular cross sections and for investigation of plasma confinement in toroidal multipoles."	
1980	Thomas H. Stix	United States	"For his contributions to the development and formalization of the theory of wave propagation in plasmas and for his pioneering research on radio frequency plasma heating. His work has played the guiding role in the understanding of waves in space plasmas and in the development of advanced plasma heating methods for controlled fusion devices."	
1981	John H. Nuckolls	United States	"For his contributions to the genesis and progress of inertial confinement fusion. His insight into the fundamental physics issues has served to guide and in-spire the technical evolution of the field."	
1982	Ira B. Bernstein	United States	"For his pioneering contributions to the theory of plasmas. His incisive studies of the physics of waves, stability, and transport have provided essential guidance to a generation of colleagues and disciples."	
1983	Harold P. Furth	Austria/United States	"For his extraordinary scientific and intellectual leadership of research on toroidal magnetic confinement fusion. His outstanding technical contributions range from his pioneering investigations of resistive instabilities to his mastery of magnetic topology which has led to new configurations of confinement."	
1984	Donald W. Kerst	United States	"For his path-breaking contributions to plasma physics, including the invention of the levitated toroidal multipole, the elucidation of classical and anomalous transport mechanisms, and the demonstration of high beta plasma confinement; for his seminal ideas on particle accelerators; and for the inspired guidance of a generation of productive experimentalists."	
1985	John H. Malmberg	United States	"For his outstanding experimental studies which expanded our understanding of wave-particle interactions in neutral plasmas and increased our confidence in plasma theory; and for his pioneering studies of the confinement and transport of pure electron plasmas."	
1986	Harold Grad	United States	"For outstanding contributions to magneto-fluid dynamics, plasma physics and Magnetic Fusion Energy. His investigations, using rigorous mathematical methods with advanced analytical and computational techniques, include seminal research on the Boltzmann equations, collisionless shocks, guiding center plasmas, and equilibrium, stability and transport theory. His work expresses a scientific philosophy that serves as a model for a new generation of theoretical physicists and mathematicians."	
1987	Bruno Coppi	Italy	"For outstanding contributions to fundamental theory, experimental interpretation and engineering design in fusion research. Among his theoretical discoveries are the ion mixing, impurity gradient, and ubiquitous modes and his work on m=1 tearing has recently been extended to explain anomalous loss of fast particles. His experimental interpretations include confinement scalings, slideaway electrons, detailed transport laws, and the principle of profile consistency. He has pioneered in the conceptual and engineering design of high field tokamaks, many of which now operate successfully, and which serve as the basis for proposals for low cost fusion ignition devices such as Ignitor."	
1988	Norman Rostoker	Canada	"In recognition of his pioneering theoretical contributions to the statistical mechanics of particles with Coulomb interactions; to the treatment of inhomogeneities, fluctuations and Larmor radius effects in plasmas; and his outstanding leadership in both experimental and theoretical research on the acceleration of electron and ion beams and their interactions with plasmas."	
1989	Ravindra N. Sudan	India	"For wide-ranging contributions to the theory of plasma stability and turbulence, and pioneering work on the generation and propagation of ion beams; his penetrating analytic and computational studies, often done with his numerous students, have had considerable impact on ionospheric and magnetospheric physics, on confinement and heating in field reversed ion rings, and on light-ion-beam drivers for inertial confinement fusion."	
1990	William L. Kruer	United States	"For outstanding and seminal contributions to the theoretical and experimental understanding of the intense electromagnetic waves with plasmas and for numerous contributions to the understanding of basic plasma phenomena via numerical simulation."	
1991	Hans R. Griem	United States	"For his numerous contributions to experimental plasma physics and spectroscopy, particularly in the area of improved diagnostic methods for high temperature plasmas, and for his books on plasma spectroscopy and spectral line broadening in plasmas that have be-come standard references in the field."	
1992	John M. Greene	United States	"For outstanding contributions to the theory of magnetohydrodynamic equilibria and ideal and resistive instabilities, for discovery of the inverse scattering trans-form leading to soliton solutions of many nonlinear partial differential equations, and for invention of the residue methods of determining the transition to global chaos."	
1993	Russell M. Kulsrud	United States	"For his pioneering contributions to basic plasma theory, to the physics of magnetically confined plasmas, and to plasma astrophysics. His important work en-compasses plasma equilibria and stability, adiabatic invariance, ballooning modes, runaway electrons, colliding beams, spin-polarized plasmas, and cosmic-ray instabilities."	
1994	Roy W. Gould	United States	"For outstanding contributions to the knowledge of plasma physics, pioneering research in beam-plasma interactions, plasma waves, cyclotron and plasma wave echoes, resonance cones, and for the dissemination of knowledge about plasmas through more than thirty years of teaching."	
1995	Francis F. Chen	United States	"For his rare combination of physical insight, theoretical ability and skill for performing careful, clear and definitive experiments. He has made fundamental contributions to plasma physics in such diverse areas as magnetic confinement devices, laser plasma interactions, novel plasma based accelerators and sources for plasma processing. Of particular note are his pioneering works on: electrostatic probes, low frequency fluctuations in magnetized plasma, parametric instabilities in laser plasma interactions, and helicon plasma sources. In addition, his classic text book Introduction to Plasma Physics and Controlled Fusion has helped educate a generation of plasma physicists."	
1996	Thomas Michael O'Neil	United States	"For seminal contributions to plasma theory, including extension of Landau damping to the nonlinear regime and demonstration of the importance of particle trapping; discovery of the plasma-wave echo; and pioneering studies of the confinement, transport, and thermal equilibria of non-neutral plasmas, liquids and crystals. His theoretical work and active guidance of experiments with trapped, non-neutral plasmas provide much of the foundation for this branch of plasma physics."	
1997	Charles F. Kennel	United States	"For his fundamental contributions to the basic plasma physics of collisionless shocks, magnetic reconnection and quasilinear theory, and to plasma astrophysics - including the Van Allen radiation belt and the Crab Nebula."	
1998	Boris B. Kadomtsev	Russia	"For fundamental contributions to plasma turbulence theory, stability and nonlinear theory of MHD and kinetic instabilities in plasmas, and for international leadership in research and teaching of plasma physics and controlled thermonuclear fusion physics."	
1999	John Bryan Taylor	United Kingdom	"For ground breaking research, distinguished by its ingenuity and clarity, in such topics as: relaxation theory, transport, finite Larmor radius effects, the minimum-B concept, adiabatic invariance, the standard map, bootstrap currents, the ballooning representation, and confinement scaling laws."	
2000	Akira Hasegawa	Japan	"For innovative discoveries and seminal contributions to the theories of nonlinear drift wave turbulence, Alfven wave propagation in laboratory and space plasmas, and optical solitons and their application to high speed communication."	
2001	Roald Sagdeev	Russia	"For an unmatched set of contributions to modern plasma theory including: collisionless shocks, stochastic magnetic fields, ion temperature gradient instabilities, quasi-linear theory, neo-classical transport, and weak turbulence theory."	
2002	Edward A. Frieman	United States	"For contributions to the theory of magnetically confined plasmas, including fundamental work on the formulation of the MHD Energy Principle and on the foundations of linear and nonlinear gyrokinetic theory essential to the analysis of microinstabilities and transport."	
2003	Eugene N. Parker	United States	"For seminal contributions in plasma astrophysics, including predicting the solar wind, explaining the solar dynamo, formulating the theory of magnetic reconnection, and the instability which predicts the escape of the magnetic fields from the galaxy."	
2004	Noah Hershkowitz	United States	"For fundamental contributions to the physics of low temperature plasmas, including radio frequency wave heating, sheath physics, potential profiles, diagnostic probes, and the industrial applications of plasmas."	
2004	Valery Godyak	Russia	"For fundamental contributions to the physics of low temperature plasmas, including radio frequency wave heating, sheath physics, potential profiles, diagnostic probes, and the industrial applications of plasmas."	
2005	Nathaniel Fisch	United States	"For theoretical development of efficient rf-driven current in plasmas and for greatly expanding our ability to understand, to analyze, and to utilize wave-plasma interactions."	
2006	Chandrashekhar J. Joshi	India	"For his insight and leadership in applying plasma concepts to high energy electron and positron acceleration, and for his creative exploration of related aspects of plasma physics."	
2007	John Lindl	United States	"For 30 years of continuous plasma physics contributions in high energy density physics and inertial confinement fusion research and scientific management."	
2008	Ronald C. Davidson	Canada	"For pioneering contributions to the physics of one-component non-neutral plasmas, intense charge particle beams, and collective nonlinear interaction processes in high-temperature plasmas."	
2009	Miklos Porkolab	Hungary	"For pioneering investigations of linear and nonlinear plasma waves and wave-particle interactions; fundamental contributions to the development of plasma heating, current drive and diagnostics; and leadership in promoting plasma science education and domestic and international collaborations."	
2010	James Drake	United States	"For pioneering investigations of plasma instabilities in magnetically confined, astrophysical and laser-driven plasmas; in particular, explication of the fundamental mechanism of fast reconnection of magnetic fields in plasmas; and leadership in promoting plasma science."	
2011	Gregor Morfill	Germany	"For pioneering, and seminal contributions to, the field of dusty plasmas, including work leading to the discovery of plasma crystals, to an explanation for the complicated structure of Saturn's rings, and to microgravity dusty plasma experiments conducted first on parabolic-trajectory flights and then on the International Space Station."	
2012	Liu Chen	United States	"For seminal contributions to plasma theory, including geomagnetic pulsation, kinetic Alfvén wave, toroidal Alfvén eigenmode, fishbone oscillation and energetic particle mode, nonlinear dynamics of drift wave, and nonlinear gyrokinetic equation."	
2013	Phillip A. Sprangle	United States	"For pioneering contributions to the physics of high intensity laser interactions with plasmas, and to the development of plasma accelerators, free-electron lasers, gyrotrons and high current electron accelerators"	
2014	Clifford Surko	United States	"For the invention of and development of techniques to accumulate, confine, and utilize positron plasmas, and for seminal experimental studies of waves and turbulence in tokamak plasmas."	
2015	Masaaki Yamada	Japan	"For fundamental experimental studies of magnetic reconnection relevant to space, astrophysical and fusion plasmas, and for pioneering contributions to the field of laboratory plasma astrophysics."	
2016	Ellen G. Zweibel	United States	"For seminal research on the energetics, stability, and dynamics of astrophysical plasmas, including those related to stars and galaxies, and for leadership in linking plasma and other astrophysical phenomena."	
2017	Dmitri Ryutov	Russia	"For many outstanding contributions to the theoretical plasma physics of low and high energy density plasmas, open and closed magnetic configurations, and laboratory and astrophysical systems."	
2018	Keith H. Burrell	United States	"For pioneering research, including key experimental advances and diagnostic development, that established the links between sheared plasma flow and turbulent transport, leading to improved confinement regimes for magnetized plasmas through turbulent transport reduction by sheared flow."	
2019	William Matthaeus	United States	"For pioneering research into the nature of turbulence in space and astrophysical plasmas, which has led to major advances in understanding particle transport, dissipation of turbulent energy, and magnetic reconnection."	
2020	Warren B. Mori	United States	"For leadership in and pioneering contributions to the theory and kinetic simulations of nonlinear processes in plasma-based acceleration, and relativistically intense laser and beam plasma interactions."	
2021	Margaret G. Kivelson	United States	"For groundbreaking discoveries in space plasma physics and for seminal theoretical contributions to understanding space plasma processes and magnetohydrodynamics."	
2022	Amitava Bhattacharjee	United States	"For seminal theoretical investigations of a wide range of fundamental plasma processes, including magnetic reconnection, magnetohydrodynamic turbulence, dynamo action, and dusty plasmas, and for pioneering contributions to linking laboratory plasmas to space and astrophysical plasmas."	
2023	Thomas M. Antonsen Jr.	United States	"For pioneering contributions in the theory of magnetized plasma stability, RF current drive, laser-plasma interactions, and charged particle beam dynamics."	
2024	Greg Hammett	United States	"For pioneering work in kinetic plasma turbulence that revolutionizes turbulent transport calculations for magnetic confinement devices and inspires research in astrophysical plasma turbulence."	
2024	William Dorland	United States	"For pioneering work in kinetic plasma turbulence that revolutionizes turbulent transport calculations for magnetic confinement devices and inspires research in astrophysical plasma turbulence."	
2025	William Walter Heidbrink	United States	"For studies of resonant and non-resonant energetic particle transport in magnetized plasmas, innovative diagnostic methods, and the experimental discovery of detrimental fast-ion driven instabilities."	

== See also ==
- Hannes Alfvén Prize
- List of physics awards
- List of prizes named after people
