= Double layer (plasma physics) =

Structure in a plasma

A double layer is a structure in a plasma consisting of two parallel layers of opposite electrical charge. The sheets of charge, which are not necessarily planar, produce localised excursions of electric potential, resulting in a relatively strong electric field between the layers and weaker but more extensive compensating fields outside, which restore the global potential. Ions and electrons within the double layer are accelerated, decelerated, or deflected by the electric field, depending on their direction of motion.

Double layers can be created in discharge tubes, where sustained energy is provided within the layer for electron acceleration by an external power source. Double layers are claimed to have been observed in the aurora and are invoked in astrophysical applications. Similarly, a double layer in the auroral region requires some external driver to produce electron acceleration.

Electrostatic double layers are especially common in current-carrying plasmas, and are very thin (typically tens of Debye lengths), compared to the sizes of the plasmas that contain them. Other names for a double layer are electrostatic double layer, electric double layer, plasma double layers. The term 'electrostatic shock' in the magnetosphere has been applied to electric fields oriented at an oblique angle to the magnetic field in such a way that the perpendicular electric field is much stronger than the parallel electric field, In laser physics, a double layer is sometimes called an ambipolar electric field.

Double layers are conceptually related to the concept of a 'sheath' (see Debye sheath). An early review of double layers from laboratory experiment and simulations is provided by Torvén.

== Classification ==
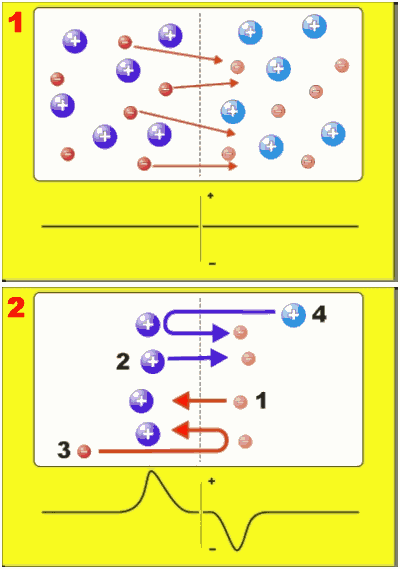
Double layer formation. Formation of a double layer requires electrons to move between two adjacent regions (Diagram 1, top) causing a charge separation. An electrostatic potential imbalance may result (Diagram 2, bottom)

Double layers may be classified in the following ways:

- Weak and strong double layers. The strength of a double layer is expressed as the ratio of the potential drop in comparison with the plasma's equivalent thermal energy, or in comparison with the rest mass energy of the electrons. A double layer is said to be strong if the potential drop within the layer is greater than the equivalent thermal energy of the plasma's components.
- Relativistic or non-relativistic double layers. A double layer is said to be relativistic if the potential drop within the layer is comparable to the rest mass energy (~512keV) of the electron. Double layers of such energy are to be found in laboratory experiments. The charge density is low between the two opposing potential regions and the double layer is similar to the charge distribution in a capacitor in that respect.
- Current carrying double layers These double layers may be generated by current-driven plasma instabilities that amplify variations of the plasma density. One example of these instabilities is the Farley–Buneman instability, which occurs when the streaming velocity of electrons (basically the current density divided by the electron density) exceeds the electron thermal velocity of the plasma. It occurs in collisional plasmas having a neutral component, and is driven by drift currents.
- Current-free double layers These occur at the boundary between plasma regions with different plasma properties. A plasma may have a higher electron temperature, and thermal velocity, on one side of a boundary layer than on the other. The same may apply for plasma densities. Charged particles exchanged between the regions may enable potential differences to be maintained between them locally. The overall charge density, as in all double layers, will be neutral.

Potential imbalance will be neutralised by electron (1&3) and ion (2&4) migration, unless the potential gradients are sustained by an external energy source. Under most laboratory situations, unlike outer space conditions, charged particles may effectively originate within the double layer, by ionization at the anode or cathode, and be sustained.

The figure shows the localised perturbation of potential produced by an idealised double layer consisting of two oppositely charged discs. The perturbation is zero at a distance from the double layer in every direction.

If an incident charged particle, such as a precipitating auroral electron, encounters such a static or quasistatic structure in the magnetosphere, provided that the particle energy exceeds half the electric potential difference within the double layer, it will pass through without any net change in energy. Incident particles with less energy than this will also experience no net change in energy but will undergo more overall deflection.

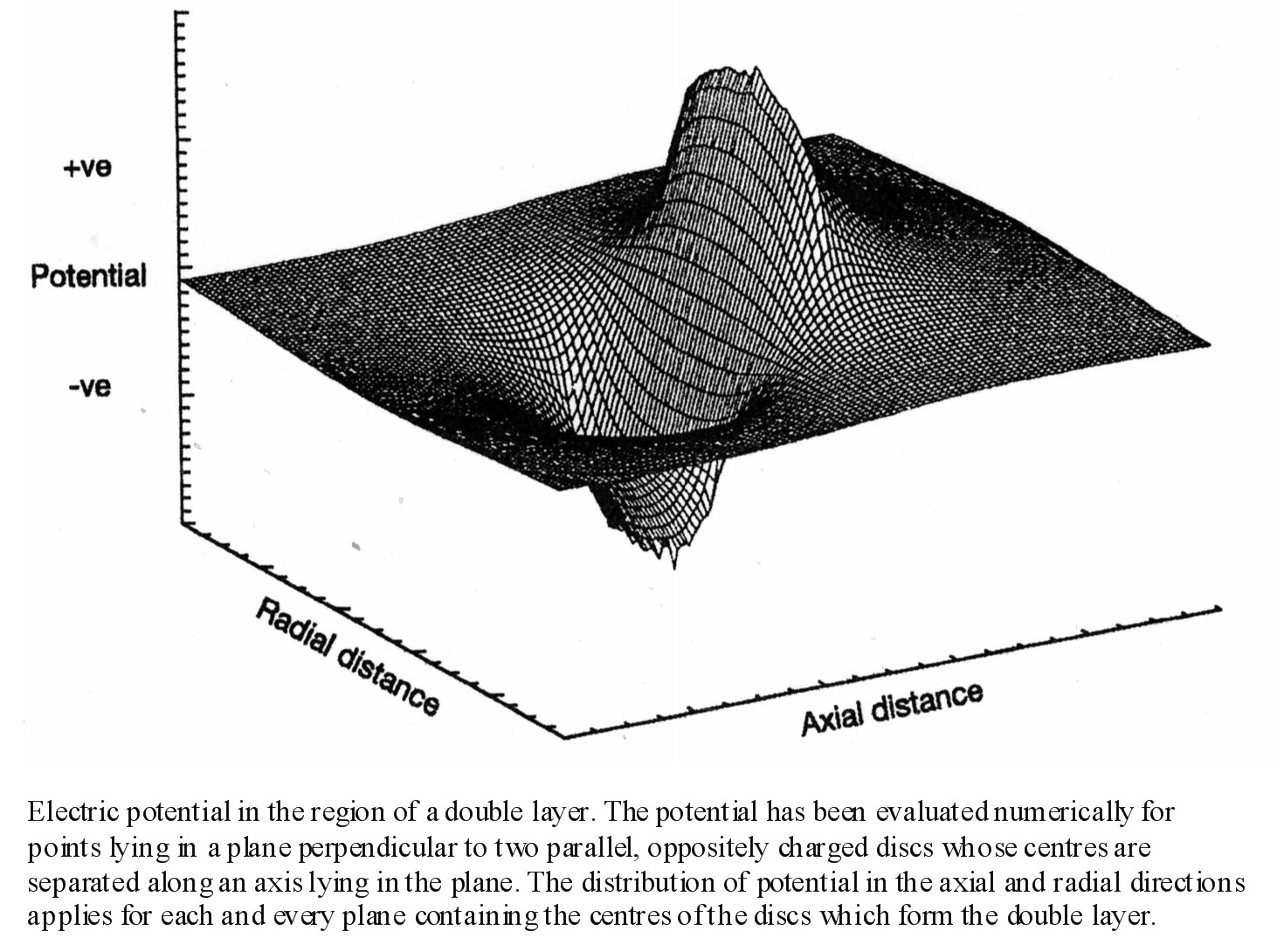

Four distinct regions of a double layer can be identified, which affect charged particles passing through it, or within it:

1. A positive potential side of the double layer where electrons are accelerated towards it;
2. A positive potential within the double layer where electrons are decelerated;
3. A negative potential within the double layer where electrons are decelerated; and
4. A negative potential side of the double layer where electrons are accelerated.

Double layers will tend to be transient in the magnetosphere, as any charge imbalance will become neutralised, unless there is a sustained external source of energy to maintain them as there is under laboratory conditions.

=== Formation mechanisms ===
The details of the formation mechanism depend on the environment of the plasma (e.g. double layers in the laboratory, ionosphere, solar wind, nuclear fusion, etc.). Proposed mechanisms for their formation have included:

- 1971: Between plasmas of different temperatures
- 1976: In laboratory plasmas
- 1982: Disruption of a neutral current sheet
- 1983: Injection of non-neutral electron current into a cold plasma
- 1985: Increasing the current density in a plasma
- 1986: In the accretion column of a neutron star
- 1986: By pinches in cosmic plasma regions
- 1987: In a plasma constrained by a magnetic mirror
- 1988: By an electrical discharge
- 1988: Current-driven instabilities (strong double layers)
- 1988: Spacecraft-ejected electron beams
- 1989: From shock waves in a plasma
- 2000: Laser radiation
- 2002: When magnetic field-aligned currents encounter density cavities
- 2003: By the incidence of plasma on the dark side of the Moon's surface. See picture.

== Features and characteristics ==
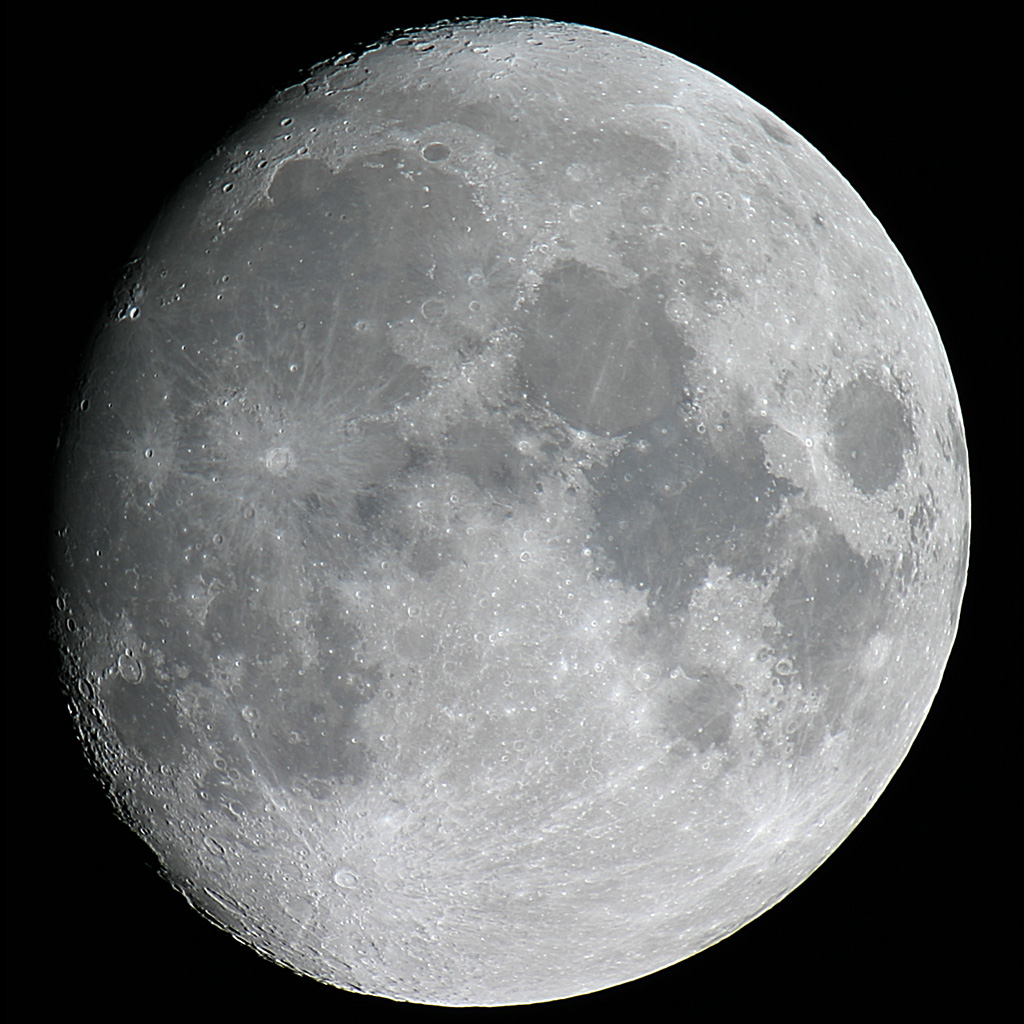
The prediction of a lunar double layer was confirmed in 2003. In the shadows, the Moon charges negatively in the interplanetary medium.

- Thickness: The production of a double layer requires regions with a significant excess of positive or negative charge, that is, where quasi-neutrality is violated. In general, quasi-neutrality can only be violated on scales of the Debye length. The thickness of a double layer is of the order of ten Debye lengths, which is a few centimeters in the ionosphere, a few tens of meters in the interplanetary medium, and tens of kilometers in the intergalactic medium.
- Electrostatic potential distribution: As described under double layer classification above, there are effectively four distinct regions of a double layer where incoming charged particles will be accelerated or decelerated along their trajectory . Within the double layer the two opposing charge distributions will tend to become neutralised by internal charged particle motion.
- Particle flux: For non-relativistic current carrying double layers, electrons carry most of the current. The Langmuir condition states that the ratio of the electron and the ion current across the layer is given by the square root of the mass ratio of the ions to the electrons. For relativistic double layers the current ratio is 1; i.e. the current is carried equally by electrons and ions.
- Energy supply: The instantaneous voltage drop across a current-carrying double layer is proportional to the total current, and is similar to that across a resistive element (or load), which dissipates energy in an electric circuit. A double layer cannot supply net energy on its own.
- Stability: Double layers in laboratory plasmas may be stable or unstable depending on the parameter regime. Various types of instabilities may occur, often arising due to the formation of beams of ions and electrons. Unstable double layers are noisy in the sense that they produce oscillations across a wide frequency band. A lack of plasma stability may also lead to a sudden change in configuration often referred to as an explosion (and hence exploding double layer). In one example, the region enclosed in the double layer rapidly expands and evolves. An explosion of this type was first discovered in mercury arc rectifiers used in high-power direct-current transmission lines, where the voltage drop across the device was seen to increase by several orders of magnitude. Double layers may also drift, usually in the direction of the emitted electron beam, and in this respect are natural analogues to the smooth-bore magnetron
- Magnetised plasmas: Double layers can form in both magnetised and unmagnetised plasmas.
- Cellular nature: While double layers are relatively thin, they will spread over the entire cross surface of a laboratory container. Likewise where adjacent plasma regions have different properties, double layers will form and tend to cellularise the different regions.

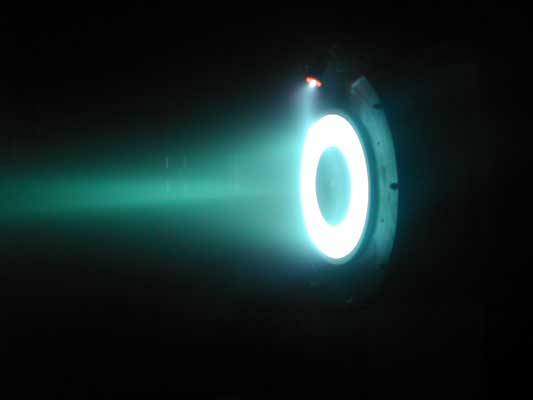
Hall effect thruster. The electric fields utilised in plasma thrusters (in particular the Helicon Double Layer Thruster) may be in the form of double layers.

- Energy transfer: Double layers can facilitate the transfer of electrical energy into kinetic energy, $\mathrm d W/\mathrm d t=I \Delta V$ where I is the electric current dissipating energy into a double layer with a voltage drop of ΔV. Alfvén points out that the current may well consist exclusively of low-energy particles. Torvén et al. have postulated that plasma may spontaneously transfer magnetically stored energy into kinetic energy by electric double layers. No credible mechanism for producing such double layers has been presented, however. Ion thrusters can provide a more direct case of energy transfer from opposing potentials in the form of double layers produced by an external electric field.
- Oblique double layer: An oblique double layer has electric fields that are not parallel to the ambient magnetic field; i.e., it is not field-aligned.
- Simulation: Double layers may be modelled using kinetic computer models like particle-in-cell (PIC) simulations. In some cases the plasma is treated as essentially one- or two-dimensional to reduce the computational cost of a simulation.
- Bohm criterion: A double layer cannot exist under all circumstances. In order to produce an electric field that vanishes at the boundaries of the double layer, an existence criterion says that there is a maximum to the temperature of the ambient plasma. This is the so-called Bohm criterion.
- Bio-physical analogy: A model of plasma double layers has been used to investigate their applicability to understanding ion transport across biological cell membranes. Brazilian researchers have noted that "Concepts like charge neutrality, Debye length, and double layer are very useful to explain the electrical properties of a cellular membrane." Plasma physicist Hannes Alfvén also noted that association of double layers with cellular structure, as had Irving Langmuir before him, who coined the term "plasma" after its resemblance to blood cells.

== History ==
In a low density plasma, localized space charge regions may build up large potential drops over distances of the order of some tens of the Debye lengths. Such regions have been called electric double layers. An electric double layer is the simplest space charge distribution that gives a potential drop in the layer and a vanishing electric field on each side of the layer. In the laboratory, double layers have been studied for half a century, but their importance in cosmic plasmas has not been generally recognized.

— Hannes Alfvén,

A cluster of double layers forming in an Alfvén wave, about a sixth of the distance from the left. Click for more details

It was already known in the 1920s that a plasma has a limited capacity for current maintenance, Irving Langmuir characterized double layers in the laboratory and called these structures double-sheaths. In the 1950s a thorough study of double layers started in the laboratory. Many groups are still working on this topic theoretically, experimentally and numerically. It was first proposed by Hannes Alfvén (the developer of magnetohydrodynamics from laboratory experiments) that the polar lights or Aurora Borealis are created by electrons accelerated in the magnetosphere of the Earth. He supposed that the electrons were accelerated electrostatically by an electric field localized in a small volume bounded by two charged regions, and the so-called double layer would accelerate electrons earthwards. Since then other mechanisms involving wave-particle interactions have been proposed as being feasible, from extensive spatial and temporal in situ studies of auroral particle characteristics.

Many investigations of the magnetosphere and auroral regions have been made using rockets and satellites. McIlwain discovered from a rocket flight in 1960 that the energy spectrum of auroral electrons exhibited a peak that was thought then to be too sharp to be produced by a random process and which suggested, therefore, that an ordered process was responsible. It was reported in 1977 that satellites had detected the signature of double layers as electrostatic shocks in the magnetosphere. indications of electric fields parallel to the geomagnetic field lines was obtained by the Viking satellite, which measures the differential potential structures in the magnetosphere with probes mounted on 40m long booms. These probes measured the local particle density and the potential difference between two points 80m apart. Asymmetric potential excursions with respect to 0 V were measured, and interpreted as a double layer with a net potential within the region. Magnetospheric double layers typically have a strength $e\phi_{DL}/k_B T_e \approx 0.1$ (where the electron temperature is assumed to lie in the range $2 eV \leq k_B T_e \leq 20 eV$) and are therefore weak. A series of such double layers would tend to merge, much like a string of bar magnets, and dissipate, even within a rarefied plasma. It has yet to be explained how any overall localised charge distribution in the form of double layers might provide a source of energy for auroral electrons precipitated into the atmosphere.

Interpretation of the FAST spacecraft data proposed strong double layers in the auroral acceleration region. Strong double layers have also been reported in the downward current region by Andersson et al. Parallel electric fields with amplitudes reaching nearly 1 V/m were inferred to be confined to a thin layer of approximately 10 Debye lengths. It is stated that the structures moved 'at roughly the ion acoustic speed in the direction of the accelerated electrons, i.e., anti-earthward.' That raises a question of what role, if any, double layers might play in accelerating auroral electrons that are precipitated downwards into the atmosphere from the magnetosphere. Double layers have also been found in the Earth's magnetosphere by the space missions Cluster and MMS.

The possible role of precipitating electrons from 1-10keV themselves generating such observed double layers or electric fields has seldom been considered or analysed. Equally, the general question of how such double layers might be generated from an alternative source of energy, or what the spatial distribution of electric charge might be to produce net energy changes, is seldom addressed. Under laboratory conditions an external power supply is available.

In the laboratory, double layers can be created in different devices. They are investigated in double plasma machines, triple plasma machines, and Q-machines. The stationary potential structures that can be measured in these machines agree very well with what one would expect theoretically. An example of a laboratory double layer can be seen in the figure below, taken from Torvén and Lindberg (1980), where we can see how well-defined and confined is the potential drop of a double layer in a double plasma machine. One of the interesting aspects of the experiment by Torvén and Lindberg (1980) is that not only did they measure the potential structure in the double plasma machine but they also found high-frequency fluctuating electric fields at the high-potential side of the double layer (also shown in the figure). These fluctuations are probably due to a beam-plasma interaction outside the double layer, which excites plasma turbulence. Their observations are consistent with experiments on electromagnetic radiation emitted by double layers in a double plasma machine by Volwerk (1993), who, however, also observed radiation from the double layer itself.

The power of these fluctuations has a maximum around the plasma frequency of the ambient plasma. It was later reported that the electrostatic high-frequency fluctuations near the double layer can be concentrated in a narrow region, sometimes called the hf-spike. Subsequently, both radio emissions, near the plasma frequency, and whistler waves at much lower frequencies were seen to emerge from this region. Similar whistler wave structures were observed together with electron beams near Saturn's moon Enceladus, suggesting the possible presence of a double layer at lower altitude.

A recent development in double layer experiments in the laboratory is the investigation of so-called stairstep double layers. It has been observed that a potential drop in a plasma column can be divided into different parts. Transitions from a single double layer into two-, three-, or greater-step double layers are strongly sensitive to the boundary conditions of the plasma.

Unlike experiments in the laboratory, the concept of such double layers in the magnetosphere, and any role in creating the aurora, suffers from there so far being no identified steady source of energy. The electric potential characteristic of double layers might however indicate that, those observed in the auroral zone are a secondary product of precipitating electrons that have been energized in other ways, such as by electrostatic waves. Some scientists have suggested a role of double layers in solar flares. Establishing such a role indirectly is even harder to verify than postulating double layers as accelerators of auroral electrons within the Earth's magnetosphere. Serious questions have been raised on their role even there.
