= Nathaniel J. Fisch =

American plasma physicist (born 1950)

Nathaniel Joseph Fisch
- Born: December 29, 1950 (age 75)
- Education: Massachusetts Institute of Technology (B.S., M.S., Ph.D.)
- Awards: Guggenheim Fellowship (1985); E. O. Lawrence Award (2004); James Clerk Maxwell Prize for Plasma Physics (2005); Hannes Alfvén Prize (2015)
- Scientific career
- Fields: Plasma physics
- Thesis: Confining and heating a toroidal plasma with RF power. (1978)
- Website: w3.pppl.gov/~fisch/

Nathaniel Joseph Fisch is an American plasma physicist known for pioneering the excitation of electric currents in plasmas using electromagnetic waves, which was then used in tokamak experiments. This contributed to an increased understanding of plasma wave–particle interactions in the field for which he was awarded the James Clerk Maxwell Prize for Plasma Physics in 2005 and the Hannes Alfvén Prize in 2015.

Fisch's research also involve inertial fusion, as well as methods to generate intensive laser fields to accelerate particles, such as the ones used in plasma thrusters. He is also known to have worked on the hydrodynamics of charged liquids, petroleum refinement, and pattern recognition.

== Early life and career ==
Fisch studied at the Massachusetts Institute of Technology (as MIT National Scholar 1968 to 1972), where he received his bachelor's and master's degree in 1972 and 1975 respectively, and received his doctorate in computer science and electrical engineering in 1978. From 1978, he was a scientist in the plasma physics laboratory at Princeton University, where he has been a professor in the Faculty of Astrophysics since 1991 (also associated with the Faculty of Mechanics and Flight Engineering since 2000) and heads the University's Plasma Physics Program. In 1986, he was a visiting scientist at IBM's Thomas J. Watson Research Center. From 1981 to 1986, he was a consultant at Exxon Research.

== Honors and awards ==
Fisch was awarded the Guggenheim Fellowship in 1985. He was then elected a fellow of the American Physical Society in 1987, and was subsequently awarded the John Dawson Award for Excellence in Plasma Physics Research in 1992 for fundamental theoretical work on non-inductive power generation in toroidally enclosed plasmas.

In 2004, he received the Ernest Orlando Lawrence Award.

In 2005, he received the James Clerk Maxwell Prize for Plasma Physics for "theoretical development of efficient radio frequency (RF)-driven current in plasmas and for greatly expanding our ability to understand, to analyze, and to utilize wave–plasma interactions."

In 2015, he was awarded the Hannes Alfvén Prize from the European Physical Society for "his contributions to the understanding of plasma wave–particle interactions and their applications to efficiently driving currents with radio-frequency waves."
