= Ellen Gould Zweibel =

American astrophysicist

- Born: December 20, 1952 (age 73); New York City, New York
- Education: University of Chicago (B.S.); Princeton University (Ph.D.)
- Awards: James Clerk Maxwell Prize for Plasma Physics (2016); Bruce Medal (2022)
- Scientific career
- Fields: Astrophysics, Plasma physics
- Institutions: University of Colorado; University of Wisconsin–Madison
- Doctoral advisor: Jeremiah P. Ostriker

Ellen Gould Zweibel (born 20 December 1952, New York City) is an American astrophysicist and plasma physicist.

In 1973, Zweibel received her bachelor's degree in mathematics from the University of Chicago, and in 1977 her Ph.D. in physics from Princeton University, with her thesis The Equilibrium and Radial Oscillations of Cool Stellar Disks, under the supervision of Jeremiah P. Ostriker. She was a visiting scholar at the Institute for Advanced Study for the academic year 1977–1978 and then joined the solar physics group of the High Altitude Observatory of the National Center for Atmospheric Research. In addition, from 1980 to 2003 she was a professor at the University of Colorado. She is now the William L. Kraushaar Professor of Astronomy and Physics at the University of Wisconsin–Madison. Zweibel is a founding member and former director of the Center of Magnetic Self-Organization of the National Science Foundation (NSF) and of the Department of Energy (DOE).

== Recognition ==
In 1991, she was elected a Fellow of the American Physical Society.

In 2016, she received the James Clerk Maxwell Prize for Plasma Physics for "seminal research on the energetics, stability, and dynamics of astrophysical plasmas, including those related to stars and galaxies, and for leadership in linking plasma and other astrophysical phenomena". She investigates astrophysical phenomena and plasmas physics of the sun, stars, galaxies, and clusters of galaxies.

She was elected to the National Academy of Sciences in 2021.
