= William L. Kruer =

American physicist

- Born: April 20, 1942 (age 83); Louisville, Kentucky
- Education: University of Louisville (B.S., M.S.); Princeton University (Ph.D.)
- Awards: James Clerk Maxwell Prize for Plasma Physics (1990)
- Scientific career
- Fields: Plasma physics

William L. Kruer (born 20 April 1942, Louisville, Kentucky) is an American physicist, specializing in plasma physics.

Kruer studied at the University of Louisville (Master's degree, 1965) and received his Ph.D. in 1969 from Princeton University. Afterwards, he was a research associate scientist at the Princeton Plasma Physics Laboratory and from 1970 a full member of the research staff. Starting in 1972, he was a group leader for theoretical plasma physics and simulation at Lawrence Livermore National Laboratory and from 1993 a chief scientist in plasma physics there. He wrote an important book on laser plasma interactions.

In 1990, he received the James Clerk Maxwell Prize for Plasma Physics.
