= Saskia Mordijck =

Belgian and American plasma physicist

Saskia Mordijck is a Belgian and American plasma physicist, the Class of 1955 Associate Professor of Physics at the College of William & Mary in Williamsburg, Virginia. Her research involves the computational and experimental study of Magnetic confinement fusion, including work with the Large Plasma Device and ITER experiments.

== Education and career ==
Mordijck studied mechanical engineering as an undergraduate student in Belgium, at Katholieke Universiteit Leuven. She continued her studies in mechanical engineering, applied physics, and engineering physics at the University of California, San Diego, where she received a master's degree in 2010 and completed her Ph.D. in 2011 under the supervision of Richard A. Moyer of the Center for Energy Research.

She joined the College of William & Mary in 2011 as a research assistant professor in the Department of Physics and the Department of Applied Science. In 2016 she became a regular-rank assistant professor of applied science, moving to physics in 2019. She was promoted to associate professor in 2022.

Mordijck headed the Topical group on Confinement and Transport of the ITER fusion experiment from 2016 to 2018. She chaired the Women in Plasma Physics program of the American Physical Society (APS) from 2020 to 2022, and was president of the University Fusion Association for the 2023–2025 term.

== Recognition ==
Mordijck received a National Science Foundation CAREER Award in 2022, funding her work on the Large Plasma Device experiment. At the College of William and Mary, she was the Fall 2025 Tack Lecturer, and a recipient of the college's 2025 Plumeri Award for Faculty Excellence.

Mordijck was named as a Fellow of the American Physical Society in 2025, after a nomination from the APS Division of Plasma Physics, "for pioneering and fundamental research on particle transport in tokamaks, which included combining theoretical modeling and measurements to illustrate the role of turbulence and fueling in determining density profile structure, and for exceptional leadership in the plasma research community".
