= Phillip Sprangle =

American physicist (born 1944)

Phillip A. Sprangle
- Born: September 27, 1944 (age 81); Brooklyn, New York
- Education: Polytechnic Institute of Brooklyn (BS); University of Puerto Rico (MS); Cornell University (Ph.D.)
- Awards: James Clerk Maxwell Prize for Plasma Physics (2013); Presidential Rank Award (2015)
- Scientific career
- Fields: Plasma physics
- Thesis: (1973)

Phillip A. Sprangle (born September 27, 1944, in Brooklyn) is an American physicist who specializes in the applications of plasma physics. He is known for his work involving the propagation of high-intensity laser beams in the atmosphere, the interaction of ultra-short laser pulses from high-power lasers with matter, nonlinear optics and nonlinear plasma physics, free electron lasers, and lasers in particle acceleration.

== Early life and career ==
Sprangle received a bachelor's degree in electrical engineering from the Polytechnic Institute of Brooklyn in 1967, a master's degree from the University of Puerto Rico in 1969, and a Ph.D. in applied physics from Cornell University (where he had been since 1969) in 1973. From 1972, he was at the Naval Research Laboratory, from 1982 as a senior scientist. There he headed the beam physics department. He is a professor at the University of Maryland.

== Honors and awards ==
In 2008, Sprangle received the IEEE Plasma Science Award, in 1991 the International Free Electron Laser Prize, in 1986 the E. O. Hulburt Science and Engineering Award, in 2008 an award as Top Navy Scientist and Engineer of the Year and in 2012 the Fred E. Saalfeld Award for Outstanding Lifetime Achievement Scientist from the Office of Naval Research.

In 2013, he received the James Clerk Maxwell Prize for Plasma Physics, for “pioneering contributions to the physics of high intensity laser interactions with plasmas, and to the development of plasma accelerators, free-electron lasers, gyrotrons and high current electron accelerators".

He is a fellow of the American Physical Society, the Optical Society of America and the IEEE.
