= Ronald C. Davidson =

Canadian physicist, professor and scientific administrator

Ronald Crosby Davidson
- Born: July 3, 1941; Norwich, Ontario, Canada
- Died: May 19, 2016 (aged 74); Cranbury, New Jersey, US
- Education: McMaster University (B.S.); Princeton University (Ph.D.)
- Awards: James Clerk Maxwell Prize for Plasma Physics (2008)
- Scientific career
- Fields: Plasma physics
- Thesis: Weak turbulence in a homogeneous plasma (1966)
- Doctoral advisor: Edward A. Frieman

Ronald Crosby Davidson (3 July 1941 – 19 May 2016) was a Canadian physicist, professor, and scientific administrator who worked in the United States. He served as the first director of the MIT Plasma Science and Fusion Center from 1978 to 1988, and as director of the Princeton Plasma Physics Laboratory from 1991 to 1996. He had been Professor of Astrophysical Sciences at Princeton University since 1991.

Davidson was born in Norwich, Ontario, Canada. He received his bachelor's degree from McMaster University in 1963 and his doctorate in physics from Princeton University in 1966. He was a postdoctoral researcher at the University of California, Berkeley from 1966 to 1968. In 1968, he went to teach at the University of Maryland, where he became a full professor in 1972. In 1978, he moved to the Massachusetts Institute of Technology, where he taught until 1991.

Davidson was a fellow of the American Physical Society and the American Association for the Advancement of Science. He received the Leadership Award from Fusion Power Associates in 1986 and the 2005 IEEE Particle Accelerator Science and Technology Award. In 2008, he received the James Clerk Maxwell Prize for Plasma Physics for "pioneering contributions to the physics of one-component non-neutral plasmas, intense charge particle beams, and collective nonlinear interaction processes in high-temperature plasmas."

Davidson was a resident of Cranbury, New Jersey. He died on May 19, 2016, at his home.
