= Gregor Morfill =

German physicist (born 1945)

Gregor Eugen Morfill
- Born: 23 July 1945 (age 81); Oberhausen, Germany
- Education: Imperial College London (B.S., Ph.D.)
- Awards: Wissenschaftspreis (1998); Ziolkowski Medal (2007); James Clerk Maxwell Prize for Plasma Physics (2011)
- Scientific career
- Fields: Plasma physics, astrophysics, plasma medicine
- Thesis: (1971)

Gregor Eugen Morfill (born 23 July 1945 in Oberhausen, Germany) is a German physicist who works in basic astrophysical research and deals with complex plasmas and plasma medicine.

== Early life and career ==
Gregor Morfill moved to England in 1961. There, he completed his school education and began studying physics at Imperial College London in 1964. In 1967, he graduated with a Bachelor of Science. In 1968, he received a diploma from Imperial College London and in 1971 he received a PhD with his work Satellite studies of energetic particles above the atmosphere. He then went to the Max Planck Institute for Extraterrestrial Physics in Garching. In 1977, he did his post-doctorate at Heidelberg University.

In 1975, he received a professorship at the Max Planck Institute for Nuclear Physics in Heidelberg. In 1983, he headed the Theoretical Astronomy Program at the University of Arizona. In 1984, he became director of the Max Planck Institute for Extraterrestrial Physics.

Since 2011, he has been on the scientific advisory board of Bauman University in Moscow. In the same year, he was co-founder of the company terraplasma in Garching near Munich, which develops devices and processes that use cold plasmas for wound healing, among other things.

== Scientific contributions ==
Morfill is the author and co-author of over 500 scientific publications and a popular science book on chaos theory.

In addition to his astrophysical work, Gregor Morfill makes important contributions to the subject of "dusty complex plasmas" (with application to space plasmas and the explanation of the structure of Saturn rings), to the discovery of plasma crystals as a solid state of aggregation of dusty plasmas (discovered in 1994) and to microscopic analysis of the melting process in plasma crystals. He also participates in space plasma experiments with the International Space Station (ISS), such as the experiment PKE-Nefedov (2001–2005) in cooperation with the Russian space agency and the Institute for High Energy Densities (IHED, JIHT) in Moscow. Morfill also researches applications of plasma in medicine such as in the treatment of chronic wounds.

== Honors and awards ==
- 1998: Bavarian Prime Minister's recognition award
- 1998: Wissenschaftspreis of the Stifterverband für die Deutsche Wissenschaft
- 1999: Member of the Russian Academy of Sciences
- 2003: Honorary doctorate from the Technische Universität Berlin
- 2007: Ziolkowski Medal of the Russian space agency Roscosmos
- 2010: Fellow of the Institute of Physics
- 2011: James Clerk Maxwell Prize for Plasma Physics from the American Physical Society for "pioneering, and seminal contributions to, the field of dusty plasmas, including work leading to the discovery of plasma crystals, to an explanation for the complicated structure of Saturn's rings, and to microgravity dusty plasma experiments conducted first on parabolic-trajectory flights and then on the International Space Station."
- Patten Prize
- Gagarin Medal
- URGO Foundation for Advances in Dermatology Award
