= Laura Berzak Hopkins =

American physicist

Laura Berzak Hopkins is an American plasma physicist who works at the Princeton Plasma Physics Laboratory as the Deputy Director for Research and Chief Research Officer.

== Education and career ==
Berzak Hopkins is originally from New Jersey, and studied both chemistry and physics at Dartmouth College, including a college internship at the Princeton Plasma Physics Laboratory. She completed a Ph.D. at Princeton University in 2010, based on research at the Plasma Physics Laboratory's Lithium Tokamak Experiment, a project aimed at initiating nuclear fusion through magnetic confinement.

In 2010 and 2011, she worked in Washington, D.C., as a Congressional Fellow of the American Physical Society, working first in the House Foreign Relations subcommittee on terrorism, nonproliferation and trade and then in the office of senator Kent Conrad. She became a researcher at the Lawrence Livermore National Laboratory (LLNL) in 2012. Her work focused on the “development of inertial confinement fusion laser-target designs with high density carbon capsules and high efficiency, low gas-fill density hohlraums as well as enhanced target implosion symmetry control with laser pulse shaping; this laser-target platform became the foundation for the first successful ignition design.” At LLNL, she also became associate program director for Integrated Weapon Science, and deputy for assessment science to the U.S. Department of Energy and National Nuclear Security Administration Office of Experimental Sciences.

In 2025, she returned to the Princeton Plasma Physics Laboratory to become its associate laboratory director for strategy and partnerships and deputy chief research officer.

== Recognition ==
Berzak Hopkins was elected as a Fellow of the American Physical Society (APS), in the 2025 class of fellows, after a nomination from the APS Division of Plasma Physics.
