= Weichao Tu =

Chinese-American space physicist

Weichao Tu is a Chinese and American space physicist whose research interests involve modeling the dynamics of charged particles and plasma in the Van Allen radiation belt, with goals including protecting satellites from space weather. She is an associate professor in the Department of Climate and Space Sciences and Engineering at the University of Michigan.

== Education and career ==
Tu graduated from Peking University in 2006 with a bachelor's degree in geophysics. She continued her studies in aerospace engineering at the University of Colorado Boulder, where she received a master's degree in 2008 and completed her Ph.D. in 2011.

After postdoctoral research at the Los Alamos National Laboratory from 2012 to 2015, she joined the West Virginia University Department of Physics and Astronomy as an assistant professor in 2015. She was promoted to associate professor there in 2020. In 2025, she moved to her present position at the University of Michigan.

== Recognition ==
Tu received a National Science Foundation CAREER Award in 2018. West Virginia University named her as a 2022–2023 Benedum Distinguished Scholar.

She was the 2021 recipient of the Katherine Weimer Award for Women in Plasma Science of the American Physical Society (APS), given to her "for contributions to the understanding of the radiation belts, in particular by pioneering the technique of ‘event-specific’ radiation belt modeling to distinguished different physical processes that control radiation belt dynamics". The APS Division of Plasma Physics named her as a Distinguished Lecturer in Plasma Physics for 2022.
