= Hans R. Griem =

German-American physicist (1928–2019)

Hans Rudolf Griem
- Born: October 7, 1928; Kiel, Germany
- Died: October 2, 2019 (aged 90); Fairfax, Virginia
- Education: University of Kiel (Ph.D.)
- Awards: James Clerk Maxwell Prize for Plasma Physics (1991)
- Scientific career
- Fields: Plasma physics
- Thesis: (1954)

Hans Rudolf Griem (October 7, 1928 – October 2, 2019) was a German-American physicist who specialized in experimental plasma physics and spectroscopy.

== Early life and career ==
Griem received his doctorate from the University of Kiel in 1954 and in the same year accepted a Fulbright Fellowship at the University of Maryland to work on the physics of the upper atmosphere. He then returned to the University of Kiel for a two-year appointment dealing with high temperature physics. In 1957, he began working at the University of Maryland, first as an assistant professor in plasma physics before becoming an associate professor in 1961 and then full professor in 1963. He retired as professor emeritus in 1994.

From 1976 to 1994, Griem was a consultant at Los Alamos National Laboratory.

== Honors and awards ==
In 1967, Griem was elected a fellow of the American Physical Society. In 1991, he received the James Clerk Maxwell Prize for Plasma Physics for "his numerous contributions to experimental plasma physics and spectroscopy, particularly in the area of improved diagnostic methods for high temperature plasmas, and for his books on plasma spectroscopy and spectral line broadening in plasmas that have become standard references in the field".

Griem also received a Guggenheim Fellowship, a Humboldt Award and the William F. Meggers Award of the Optical Society.

== Books ==
- Griem, Hans R. (1964). Plasma spectroscopy. New York: McGraw-Hill.
- Griem, Hans R. (1974). Spectral line broadening by plasmas. Academic Press. ISBN 0-12-302850-7. OCLC 638552796.
- Griem, Hans R. (2009). Principles of Plasma Spectroscopy. Cambridge University Press. ISBN 978-0-511-52457-8. OCLC 958550713.
