= Harold Furth =

Austrian-American physicist

Harold Paul Furth
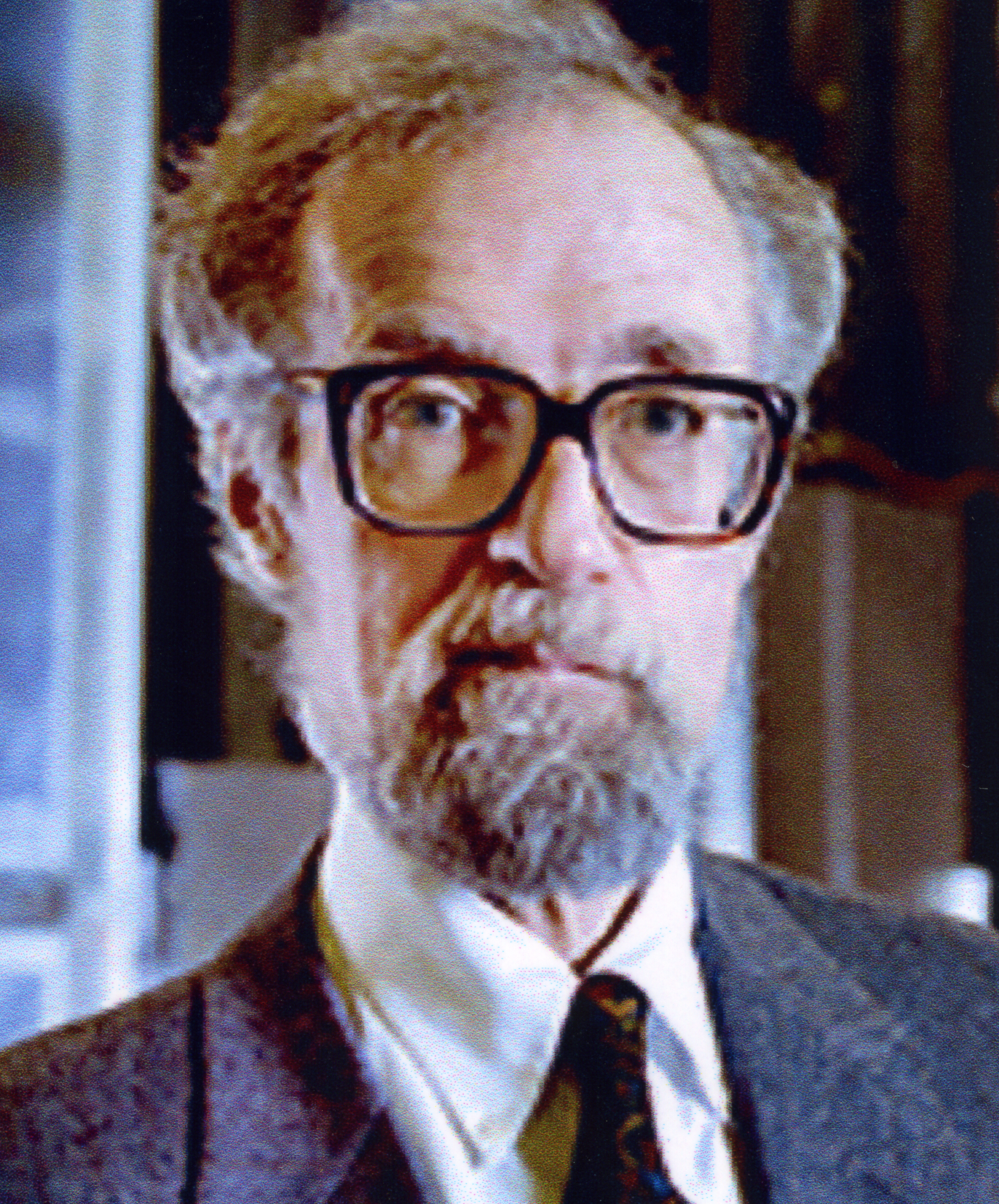
- Born: Harald Fürth; January 13, 1930; Vienna, Austria
- Died: February 21, 2002 (aged 72); Philadelphia, Pennsylvania, US
- Resting place: Princeton Cemetery, Princeton, NJ
- Education: Harvard University (B.S., Ph.D.)
- Known for: Resistive magnetohydrodynamics
- Awards: James Clerk Maxwell Prize for Plasma Physics (1983); Delmer S. Fahrney Medal (1992)
- Scientific career
- Fields: physics, astrophysics, magnetohydrodynamics, nuclear radiation, controlled thermonuclear fusion
- Institutions: Lawrence Livermore National Laboratory, Princeton University

Harold Paul Furth (January 13, 1930 – February 21, 2002) was an Austrian-American physicist who was a pioneer in leading the American efforts to harness thermonuclear fusion for the generation of electricity. He died of a heart ailment on 21 February 2002.

== Early life ==
Furth emigrated to the United States in 1941. His father fled a POW camp during WWI, but returned to Vienna a few years later. In his later years, he ran a shoe-making business with his family. He also developed an interest for literature. In the summer of 1939, Harold's father had escaped to Switzerland. After studying at the French-speaking École Internationale in Geneva, Harold immigrated to New York City in 1941. He later graduated at the head of his class at The Hill School. He graduated from Harvard University with a bachelor's degree in 1951 and received his Ph.D. from Harvard in 1960. His PhD thesis is entitled Magnetic Analysis of K^{–} Interactions in Emulsion Nuclei.

== Career ==
Furth worked at Lawrence Livermore National Laboratory from 1956 to 1967 before going in 1967 to Princeton Plasma Physics Laboratory (PPPL) where he would spend the rest of his career working in plasma physics and nuclear fusion. He was also a professor of astrophysics at Princeton University.

In the late 1960s, Furth contributed some important theoretical work on resistive magnetohydrodynamics instabilities in a slightly resistive plasma.

In 1981 Furth became the director at PPPL and led the laboratory until 1990 during record setting magnetic fusion energy experiments on the largest tokamak in the country, the Tokamak Fusion Test Reactor (TFTR).

== Awards ==
In 1983, Furth was awarded the James Clerk Maxwell Prize for Plasma Physics by the American Physical Society. In 1992, he was awarded the Delmer S. Fahrney Medal (now known as the Benjamin Franklin Medal in Physics) by the Franklin Institute.

Furth was also a member of the National Academy of Sciences.
