= Roy W. Gould =

American physicist (1927–2022)

Roy Walter Gould
- Born: April 25, 1927; Los Angeles, California, U.S.
- Died: February 19, 2022 (aged 94)
- Education: California Institute of Technology (B.E., Ph.D.); Stanford University (M.E.)
- Known for: Trivelpiece–Gould modes, ion oscillations in a hot plasma, resonance cones, plasma wave echo, cyclotron echoes, compressional hydromagnetic waves
- Awards: James Clerk Maxwell Prize for Plasma Physics (1994)
- Scientific career
- Fields: Plasma physics, microwaves
- Institutions: California Institute of Technology
- Website: directory.caltech.edu/personnel/rwgould

Roy Walter Gould (April 25, 1927 – February 19, 2022) was an American electrical engineer and physicist who specialized in plasma physics. In 1959, he (together with Alvin Trivelpiece) was the first to describe electrostatic waves that were propagating at the boundary of a magnetized plasma column, now commonly known as Trivelpiece–Gould modes.

Gould was elected a member of the National Academy of Engineering in 1971 for pioneering contributions to microwave electronics and plasma physics and distinguished service in higher education.

== Early life and career ==
Gould was born in Los Angeles, California on April 25, 1927. He studied at Caltech (bachelor's degree in electrical engineering in 1949), at Stanford University (master's degree in electrical engineering in 1950) and received his doctorate in physics from Caltech in 1956 (on microwave and radio noise from the sun). In 1951–52, he was a research engineer for rocket control at the Jet Propulsion Laboratory of Caltech and from 1953 to 1955 at Hughes Aircraft, where he researched electron tubes.

In 1955, he became an associate professor and 1960 professor of electrical engineering at Caltech. In 1974, he changed to the faculty of physics as professor of applied physics, and from 1980 he was Simon Ramo Professor. Since 1996 he was professor emeritus.

From 1979 to 1985, he was chairman of the division of engineering and applied science at Caltech. From 1970 to 1972, he was director of fusion research at the Atomic Energy Commission.

== Personal life ==
Gould died on February 19, 2022, at the age of 94.

== Honors and awards ==
In 1966, he became a fellow of the American Physical Society. He has been a member of the National Academy of Engineering since 1971 and a member of the National Academy of Sciences since 1974. In 1994, he received the James Clerk Maxwell Prize for Plasma Physics.
