= Ravindra N. Sudan =

Indian-American electrical engineer and physicist

Ravindra Nath Sudan
- Born: June 8, 1931; Chenani, Jammu and Kashmir
- Died: January 22, 2009 (aged 77); St. Petersburg, Florida
- Education: Punjab University (B.A.); India Institute of Science (Dip.); Imperial College London (Ph.D.)
- Awards: James Clerk Maxwell Prize for Plasma Physics (1989)
- Scientific career
- Fields: Plasma physics

Ravindra Nath Sudan (also called Ravi Sudan; June 8, 1931 – January 22, 2009) was an Indian-American electrical engineer and physicist who specialized in plasma physics. He was known for independently discovering the whistler instability in 1963, an instability which causes audible low-frequency radio waves to be emitted in the magnetosphere in the form of whistler waves. He also pioneered the study of the generation and propagation of intense ion beams, and contributed to theories of plasma instabilities and plasma turbulence.

== Early life and career ==
Sudan studied at Punjab University (Bachelor's degree in 1948) and at the India Institute of Science, where he received his diploma in 1952. In 1955, he received his doctorate in electrical engineering from Imperial College London, where he was a Tata Fellow. He then worked as an engineer at the British Thomson-Houston Company until 1957 and then at Imperial Chemical Industries.

From 1958, he was a scientist at Cornell University (in Simpson Linke's electrical engineering laboratory). His studies of power cut-off devices there led him to plasma physics. In 1959, he became assistant professor there and 1968 professor of electrical engineering and applied physics. He was IBM Professor of Engineering there from 1975 and from 1975 to 1985, the director of the Laboratory for Plasma Studies. He retired as Professor Emeritus in 2001.

In 1984, he founded the Cornell Theory Center with Kenneth G. Wilson and was its deputy director from 1985 to 1987. In 1970–71, he headed the theoretical plasma physics department at the US Naval Research Laboratory. From 1970 to 1973, he was a visiting scientist at the International Center for Theoretical Physics (ICTP) in Trieste and in 1975 at the Institute for Advanced Study in Princeton. In 1983, he was a Senior Research Fellow of the Fusion Research Institute at the University of Texas at Austin.

== Honors and awards ==
In 1968, Sudan was elected a fellow of the American Physical Society. In 1989, he received the James Clerk Maxwell Prize for Plasma Physics. In 1994, he received the gold medal from the Czechoslovak Academy of Sciences.
