= William H. Matthaeus =

American astrophysicist and plasma physicist

William Henry Matthaeus
- Education: University of Pennsylvania (B.A.); Old Dominion University (M.A.); College of William and Mary (M.S., Ph.D.)
- Awards: James Clerk Maxwell Prize for Plasma Physics (2019)
- Scientific career
- Fields: Plasma physics
- Thesis: Nonlinear Evolution of the Magnetohydrodynamic Sheet Pinch (1979)
- Doctoral advisor: David Campbell Montgomery de.wikipedia.org/wiki/David_C._Montgomery
- Website: web.physics.udel.edu/about/directory/faculty/william-matthaeus

William Henry Matthaeus (born 1951) is an American astrophysicist and plasma physicist. He is known for his research on turbulence in magnetohydrodynamics (MHD) (e.g. numerical simulations and kinetic theory) and astrophysical plasmas (e.g. solar wind and its fluctuations), for which he was awarded the 2019 James Clerk Maxwell Prize for Plasma Physics.

== Early life and career ==
Matthaeus graduated from the University of Pennsylvania with a bachelor's degree in physics and philosophy in 1973 on a scholarship from the Mayor of Philadelphia. In 1975, he received an M.A. in physics at Old Dominion University in Norfolk, Virginia, and then received an M.S. in physics and Ph.D in physics at the College of William and Mary in 1977 and 1979 respectively. His thesis was on "Nonlinear Evolution of the Magnetohydrodynamic Sheet Pinch" and he was supervised by David Campbell Montgomery. Since 1983, he has been affiliated with the Bartol Research Institute and is currently Unidel Professor of Physics and Astronomy at the University of Delaware.

Matthaeus is involved in the Swarthmore Spheromak experiment and since 2004 has been significantly involved in the Parker Solar Probe, launched in 2018, to study the corona of the sun. He has been director of NASA's Delaware Space Grant since 2016.

In the 1990s, Matthaeus applied the Lattice Boltzmann method to magnetohydrodynamics and in 1992, published a well-cited paper showing that it was possible to recover the Navier-Stokes equation by using the Lattice Boltzmann method.

== Honors and awards ==
In 1985, Matthaeus received the James B. MacElwane Award from the American Geophysical Union and became its fellow. He was then elected a fellow of the American Physical Society in 1998.

In 2019, he received the James Clerk Maxwell Prize for Plasma Physics for "pioneering research into the nature of turbulence in space and astrophysical plasmas, which has led to major advances in understanding particle transport, dissipation of turbulent energy, and magnetic reconnection".

In 2024, he won the highest faculty honor at the University of Delaware — the Francis Alison Award. This award recognizes his pioneering research in space physics and his strong history as a mentor.

In 2025, he was elected to the National Academy of Sciences.
