= Jana Brotánková =

Czech plasma physicist

- Citizenship: Czech Republic
- Education: Charles University
- Known for: Fusion plasma, Project leader of COMPASS tokamak , Ball-pen probe
- Scientific career
- Fields: Fusion plasma
- Workplaces: Czech Technical University in Prague
- Thesis: Study of high temperature plasma in tokamak-like experimental devices (2009)
- Website: https://www.cvut.cz/en/women-in-science/jana-brotankova

Jana Brotánková (born in the 1980s) is a Czech physicist specialising in thermonuclear fusion. She is based at the Faculty of Nuclear Sciences and Physical Engineering of the Czech Technical University in Prague. She has worked on plasma physics, thermonuclear fusion, fusion (tokamak, stellarator), reversed field pinch and artificial intelligence.

She is the president of the Czech Physical Society.

== Education ==
Brotánková graduated from a high school in Česká Lípa in 1997. In 2003, she graduated from physics at the Faculty of Mathematics and Physics of the Charles University, Prague. In 2009, she obtained PhD and RNDr in Plasma Physics at Charles University.

== Career ==
From 1998 to 2010, she worked at the Institute of Plasma Physics of the Czech Academy of Sciences (tokamak department). In 2010–2012, she held a fellowship in India (at the Institute for Plasma Research, Gandhi Nagar. In 2013–2015, she worked with fusion education efforts and research abroad, and then returned to Czech Technical UniversityCTU to help establish the "PlasmaLab@CTU" lab.

Her expertise includes: plasma diagnostics (Thomson scattering, probe diagnostics), plasma turbulence, magnetic topology, fusion devices (tokamak, reversed field pinch), and education in fusion physics. She has published in areas spanning fusion physics and also in conservation biology and artificial intelligence.
