= James F. Drake =

American physicist

- Born: June 26, 1947 (age 79); Pasadena, California
- Education: University of California, Los Angeles (B.S., M.S., Ph.D.)
- Known for: Fast magnetic reconnection
- Awards: James Clerk Maxwell Prize for Plasma Physics (2010)
- Scientific career
- Fields: Plasma physics
- Workplaces: University of Maryland
- Website: terpconnect.umd.edu/~drake/

For other persons named James Drake, see James Drake (disambiguation)

James F. Drake (born June 26, 1947) is an American theoretical physicist who specializes in plasma physics. He is known for his studies on plasma instabilities and magnetic reconnection for which he was awarded the 2010 James Clerk Maxwell Prize for Plasma Physics by the American Physical Society.

== Early life and career ==
Drake studied at the University of California, Los Angeles (UCLA), where he received his bachelor's degree in 1969 and received his doctorate in 1975. In 1977, he moved to the University of Maryland, where he has been a professor since 1987.

He dealt with laser-plasma interaction and plasma turbulence. He is known for explaining the mechanisms of the rapid reconnection of magnetic field lines and the resulting particle accelerations in astrophysical plasmas (for example on the sun). In computer simulations with Amitava Bhattacharjee and Michael Hesse (NASA), he was able to demonstrate the explosive nature of the dynamics of the magnetic fields, for example in solar flares.

== Honors and awards ==
In 1986, Drake was elected a fellow of the American Physical Society. He was subsequently awarded the 2010 James Clerk Maxwell Prize for Plasma Physics for "pioneering investigations of plasma instabilities in magnetically-confined, astrophysical and laser-driven plasmas; in particular, explication of the fundamental mechanism of fast reconnection of magnetic fields in plasmas; and leadership in promoting plasma science".

He also received a Senior US Research Scientist Award from the Alexander von Humboldt Foundation.
