= Yu Lin =

Chinese-American plasma physicist

Yu Lin is a Chinese and American space plasma physicist whose research involves the computational simulation of the Earth's magnetosphere and its tail, the ionosphere, and phenomena within them including magnetic reconnection, Alfvén waves, the effects of daylight, and their temperature gradients. She is Alumni Professor of Physics at Auburn University.

== Education and career ==
Lin has a 1985 bachelor's degree from Peking University. After receiving a master's degree through the Institute of Geophysics of the Chinese Academy of Sciences in 1988, she completed a Ph.D. in 1993 at the University of Alaska.

She joined Auburn University as an assistant professor in 1994, and was promoted to associate professor in 1999 and full professor in 2003. In 2013 she was named as an Alumni Professor.

== Recognition ==
Lin was the 2002 recipient of the Katherine Weimer Award for Women in Plasma Science of the American Physical Society (APS), given to her "for creative and significant contributions to theoretical and computational research in nonlinear physics in the boundary layers of space plasmas". She was named as a Fellow of the American Physical Society in 2007, after a nomination from the APS Division of Plasma Physics, "for her trailblazing global hybrid simulations of the dynamics and structures of solar wind-magnetosphere boundary layers; particularly, at the dayside magnetopause and the bow shock".

== Selected publications ==
- Lin, Y.; Lee, L. C. (1994), "Structure of reconnection layers in the magnetosphere", Space Science Reviews, 65 (1–2): 59–179, doi:10.1007/bf00749762
- Lin, Y.; Swift, D. W. (September 1996), "A two-dimensional hybrid simulation of the magnetotail reconnection layer", Journal of Geophysical Research: Space Physics, 101 (A9): 19859–19870, Bibcode:1996JGR...10119859L, doi:10.1029/96ja01457
- Lin, Y.; Wang, X. Y. (December 2005), "Three-dimensional global hybrid simulation of dayside dynamics associated with the quasi-parallel bow shock", Journal of Geophysical Research: Space Physics, 110 (A12) A12216, Bibcode:2005JGRA..11012216L, doi:10.1029/2005ja011243
- Lin, Y.; Wang, X. Y.; Lu, S.; Perez, J. D.; Lu, Q. (September 2014), "Investigation of storm time magnetotail and ion injection using three-dimensional global hybrid simulation", Journal of Geophysical Research: Space Physics, 119 (9): 7413–7432, Bibcode:2014JGRA..119.7413L, doi:10.1002/2014ja020005
- Zhang, Hui; Zong, Qiugang; Connor, Hyunju; Delamere, Peter; Facskó, Gábor; Han, Desheng; Hasegawa, Hiroshi; Kallio, Esa; Kis, Árpád; Le, Guan; Lembège, Bertrand; Lin, Yu; Liu, Terry; Oksavik, Kjellmar; Omidi, Nojan; Otto, Antonius; Ren, Jie; Shi, Quanqi; Sibeck, David; Yao, Shutao (June 2022), "Dayside transient phenomena and their impact on the magnetosphere and ionosphere", Space Science Reviews, 218 (5) 40, Bibcode:2022SSRv..218...40Z, doi:10.1007/s11214-021-00865-0, PMC 9239986, PMID 35784192
