= Maria Gatu Johnson =

Swedish-American plasma physicist

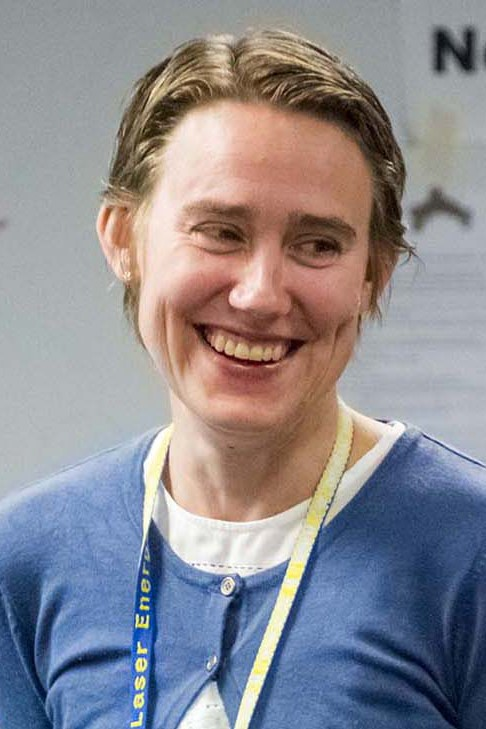
- Born: 1978 (age 47–48); Sweden
- Education: Uppsala University (2008 M.Sc.); Uppsala University (2010 Ph.D.)
- Scientific career
- Fields: Plasma physics
- Workplaces: Massachusetts Institute of Technology
- Thesis: Fusion Plasma Observations at JET with the TOFOR Neutron Spectrometer: Instrumental Challenges and Physics Results (2010)

Maria Gatu Johnson (born 1978) is a Swedish-American plasma physicist whose research involves the use of neutron spectrometry to study inertial confinement fusion and stellar nucleosynthesis. She works at the Massachusetts Institute of Technology as a principal research scientist in the MIT Plasma Science and Fusion Center.

== Education and career ==
Gatu Johnson earned a master's degree in engineering physics from Uppsala University in Sweden in 2003, and completed a Ph.D. in applied nuclear physics there in 2010. Her work there involved the application of neutron spectrometry to the Joint European Torus, a magnetic confinement fusion experiment in England.

She was a postdoctoral researcher at the MIT Plasma Science and Fusion Center from 2010 to 2013, before becoming a permanent member of the research staff there. In 2023 she was promoted to principal research scientist. At the Plasma Science and Fusion Center, she has been in charge of the Magnetic Recoil Neutron Spectrometer (MRS) beginning in 2013. In 2024 the Plasma Science and Fusion Center appointed her Assistant Director for Career Development and Community Building.

== Recognition ==
Gatu Johnson was the 2019 recipient of the Katherine E. Weimer Award of the American Physical Society (APS), given biennially to recognize early-career research excellence by a female plasma physicist. She is a recipient of the 2022 National Nuclear Security Administration Secretary's Honor Award, and of the 2023 Department of Energy Secretary's Achievement Award.

In 2022, the Burning Plasma Team of the National Ignition Facility, including Gatu Johnson, received the John Dawson Award for Excellence in Plasma Physics Research of the APS, given "for the first laboratory demonstration of a burning deuterium-tritium plasma where alpha heating dominates the plasma energetics".

She was named a Fellow of the American Physical Society in 2023, after a nomination from the APS Division of Plasma Physics, "for pioneering efforts in the cross-cut field of plasma-nuclear science and for groundbreaking studies of macroscopic plasma flows in Inertial Confinement Fusion implosions".
