= Dusty plasma =

Plasma containing suspended dust

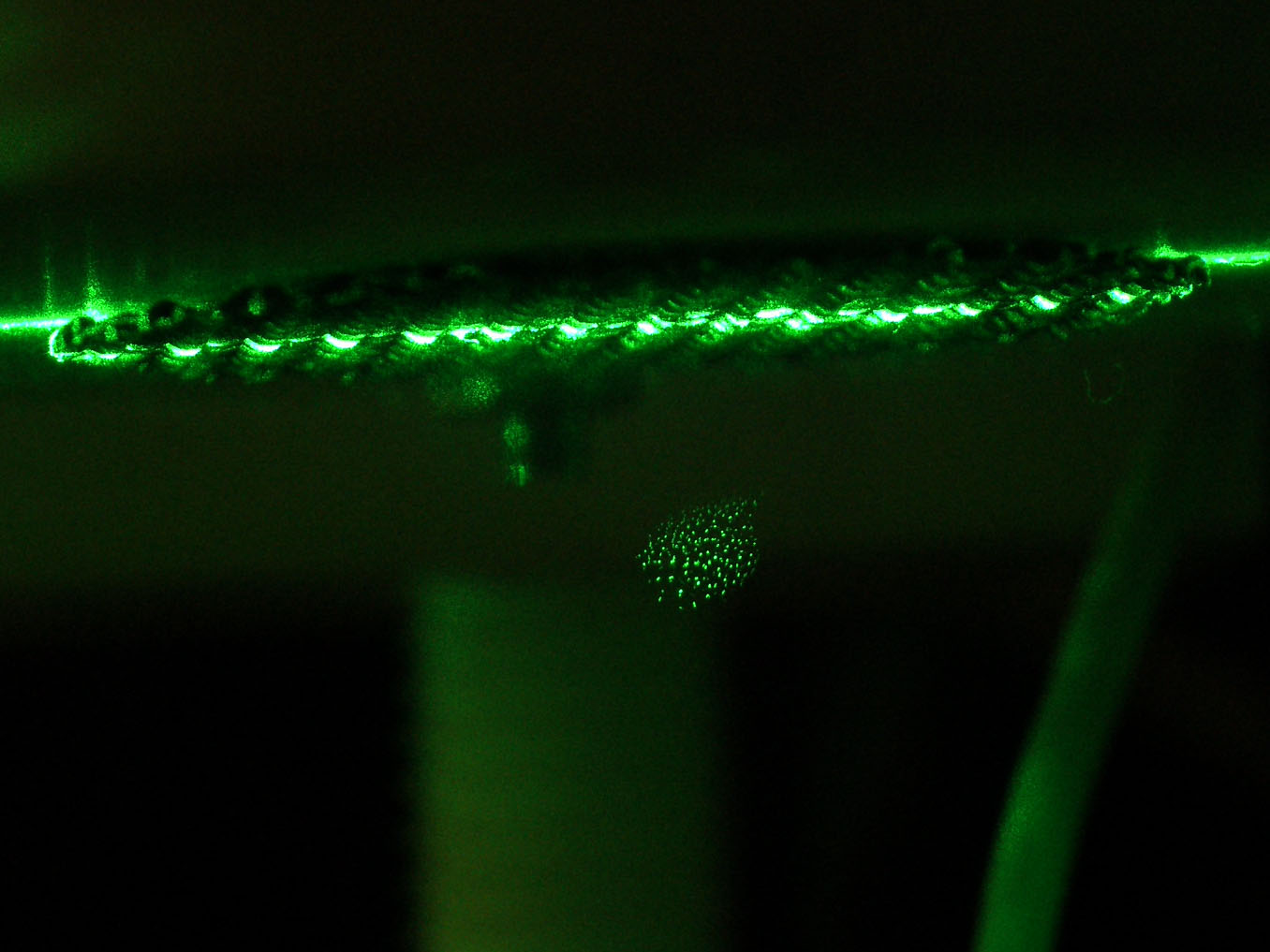
Dusty plasma near anode in glow discharge

A dusty plasma is a plasma containing suspended particles with sizes ranging from about 1 nm to 10 μm (10^{−9} m to 10^{−5} m). Dust particles are charged and the plasma and particles behave collectively as a plasma. Dust particles may form larger particles resulting in "grain plasmas". Due to the additional complexity of studying plasmas with charged dust particles, dusty plasmas are also known as complex plasmas.

Dusty plasmas are encountered in:

- Astrophysical plasmas, such as the interstellar medium
- The heliosphere and interplanetary medium
- The mesosphere of the Earth
- Specifically designed laboratory experiments

Dusty plasmas are interesting because the presence of particles significantly alters the charged particle equilibrium leading to different phenomena. It is a field of current research. Electrostatic coupling between the grains can vary over a wide range so that the states of the dusty plasma can change from weakly coupled (gaseous) to crystalline, forming so-called plasma crystals. Such plasmas are of interest as a non-Hamiltonian system of interacting particles and as a means to study generic fundamental physics of self-organization, pattern formation, phase transitions, and scaling.

== Characteristics ==
The temperature of dust in a plasma may be quite different from its environment. For example:

| Dust plasma component | Temperature |
|---|---|
| Dust temperature | 10 K |
| Molecular temperature | 100 K |
| Ion temperature | 1000 K |
| Electron temperature | 10000 K |

The electric potential of dust particles is typically 1–10 V. The potential is usually negative because the electrons are more mobile than the ions. The physics is essentially that of a Langmuir probe that draws no net current, including formation of a Debye sheath with a thickness of a few times the Debye length. If the electrons charging the dust grains are relativistic, then the dust may charge to several kilovolts. Field electron emission, which tends to reduce the negative potential, can be important due to the small size of the particles. The photoelectric effect and the impact of positive ions may actually result in a positive potential of the dust particles.

== Dynamics ==
Interest in the dynamics of charged dust in plasmas was amplified by the detection of spokes in the rings of Saturn. The motion of solid particles in a plasma follows the following equation:

$$m \frac{d v}{dt} = \mathbf{F_{L}} + \mathbf{F_G} + \mathbf{F_P}  + \mathbf{F_D} + \mathbf{F_T}$$

where terms are for the Lorentz force, the gravitational forces, forces due to radiation pressure, the drag forces and the thermophoretic force respectively.

The Lorentz force, the contributions from the electric and magnetic force, is given by:

$$F_{L} = q \left ( \mathbf{E} + \frac{\mathbf{v}}{c} \times \mathbf{B} \right )$$

where E is the electric field, v is the velocity and B is the magnetic field.

$\mathbf{F_g}$ is the sum of all gravitational forces acting on the dust particle, whether it be from planets, satellites or other particles and $\mathbf{F_P}$ is the force contribution from radiation pressure. This is given as:

$$F_{P}= \frac{\pi r_d^2 }{c} I \mathbf{\hat{e_i}}$$

The direction of the force vector, $\mathbf{\hat{e_i}}$ is that of the incident radiation of photon flux $I$. The radius of the dust particle is $r_d$.

For the drag force there are two major components of interest, those from positive ions-dust particle interactions, and neutral-dust particle interactions. Ion-dust interactions are further divided into three different interactions, through regular collisions, through Debye sheath modifications, and through coulomb collisions.

The thermophoretic force is the force that arises from the net temperature gradient that may be present in a plasma, and the subsequent pressure imbalance; causing more net momentum to be imparted from collisions from a specific direction.

Then depending in the size of the particle, there are four categories:

1. Very small particles, where $\mathbf{F_L}$ dominates over $\mathbf{F_G}$ .
2. Small grains, where q/m ≈ √G, and plasma still plays a major role in the dynamics.
3. Large grains, where the electromagnetic term is negligible, and the particles are referred to as grains. Their motion is determined by gravity and viscosity.
4. Large solid bodies. In centimeter and meter-sized bodies, viscosity may cause significant perturbations that can change an orbit. In kilometer-sized (or more) bodies, gravity and inertia dominate the motion.

== Laboratory dusty plasmas ==
Dusty plasmas are often studied in laboratory setups. The dust particles can be grown inside the plasma, or microparticles can be inserted. Usually, a low temperature plasma with a low degree of ionization is used. The microparticles then become the dominant component regarding the energy and momentum transport, and they can essentially be regarded as single-species system. This system can exist in all three classical phases, solid, liquid and gaseous, and can be used to study effects such as crystallization, wave and shock propagation, defect propagation, etc.

When particles of micrometer-size are used, it is possible to observe the individual particles. Their movement is slow enough to be able to be observed with ordinary cameras, and the kinetics of the system can be studied. However, for micrometer-sized particles, gravity is a dominant force that disturbs the system. Thus, experiments are sometimes performed under microgravity conditions during parabolic flights or on board a space station.

Dust plays also an important role in fusion plasma research. Magnetic confinement fusion energy generation requires burning D-T plasma discharges for extended periods, as anticipated for ITER and any Fusion Pilot Plant. However, this presents challenges related to dust formation inside the vacuum chamber, causing impurities and affecting performance. Dust particles, ranging from nano- to millimeter size, can be produced due to damage to plasma-facing components (PFCs) caused by high particle and heat fluxes. In fusion devices like ITER, disruptions caused by dust could significantly damage PFCs, and in-vessel dust inventory limits must be met. In some cases, dust (powders) can play a positive role, such as in-situ wall conditioning, suppression of edge-localized modes, and reduction of heat fluxes to the divertor.

== See also ==
- Padma Kant Shukla—coauthor of Introduction to Dusty Plasma Physics
