= Thomas H. Stix =

American plasma physicist (1924–2001)

- Born: Thomas Howard Stix; July 12, 1924; St. Louis, Missouri, U.S.
- Died: April 16, 2001 (aged 76); Princeton, New Jersey, U.S.
- Education: California Institute of Technology (B.S.); Princeton University (Ph.D.)
- Notable work: The Theory of Plasma Waves (1926)
- Spouse: Hazel Sherwin Stix
- Awards: Guggenheim Fellowship (1969); James Clerk Maxwell Prize for Plasma Physics (1980)
- Scientific career
- Fields: Plasma physics
- Institutions: Princeton University

Thomas Howard Stix (July 12, 1924 – April 16, 2001) was an American physicist. Stix performed seminal work in plasma physics and wrote the first mathematical treatment of the field in 1962's The Theory of Plasma Waves.

== History ==
Born in St. Louis, Missouri, on July 12, 1924, Stix grew up near Washington University. The Stix family owned Rice-Stix Inc., a dry goods firm that was among the city's largest businesses at the turn of the 20th century. It continued operations until the 1950s. His family home on Forsyth Boulevard was eventually donated to Washington University and is now the Stix International House.

Stix graduated from John Burroughs School and served in the U.S. Army as a radio expert in the Pacific theater during and after World War II. After the war, he obtained his bachelor's degree from Caltech in 1948 and his doctorate from Princeton in 1953.

He worked for Project Matterhorn, a secret U.S. study of nuclear fusion, and developed the Stix coil to contain gases that were heated to solar temperatures with electromagnetic waves. Stix's invention of the coil jump-started a period of intellectual productivity that revolutionized plasma heating research and whose influence is still felt in the field. Stix's 1975 paper “Fast Wave Heating of a Two-Component Plasma” remains one of the most cited papers ever published by the journal Nuclear Fusion.

Stix taught astrophysics at Princeton and did much of his research at the Princeton Plasma Physics Laboratory (see Model C stellarator). In 1978, Stix was appointed associate director for academic affairs at PPPL. He pioneered and for many years served as director of Princeton's Program in Plasma Physics, the first graduate-level program of its kind. In 1991, Princeton awarded its inaugural "University Award for Distinguished Teaching” to Stix for his contributions as a teacher and educator.

Stix and his wife, Hazel Sherwin, were married for 51 years and together had two children, Susan Stix Fisher of New York City and Dr. Michael Sherwin Stix of Lexington, Massachusetts. They lived their last decades in Princeton.

Stix died on April 16, 2001, of leukemia.

== Honors and awards ==
In 1962, Stix was elected chair of the Division of Plasma Physics of the American Physical Society. He received a Guggenheim Fellowship in 1969, leading to the first of his three sabbaticals at the Weizmann Institute of Science in Israel.

In 1980, the American Physical Society awarded Stix its highest honor in the plasma physics field, the James Clerk Maxwell Prize for Plasma Physics, for his pioneering role in developing and formalizing the theory of wave propagation and wave heating in plasmas.

In 1999, he received the Lifetime Achievement Award by Fusion Power Associates.

== Legacy ==
Stix's 1962 book, The Theory of Plasma Waves, has been translated into Japanese, Russian, and other languages. It received a paperback reprint in 2012 and still sells and is taught at universities around the world.

His obituary in The New York Times said that Stix's "elegant mastery of the literally infinite complexities of waves in electrified gases helped create a new field of science."

In 2013, the American Physical Society created the Thomas H. Stix Award, presented annually to a plasma physics researcher with outstanding contributions early in their career.

== Bibliography ==
- The Theory of Plasma Waves. New York City: McGraw-Hill. 1962 – via Internet Archive.
- Waves in Plasmas. New York: American Institute of Physics. 1992. ISBN 9780883188590. OCLC 929636850.
