= Drift waves =

Type of magnetohydrodynamic instability

In plasma physics, a drift wave is a type of collective excitation that is driven by a pressure gradient within a magnetised plasma, which can be destabilised by differences between ion and electron motion (then known as drift-wave instability or drift instability). The equations which describe these waves possess a number of solutions, including ion-acoustic solitary waves, and are roughly analogous to modons.

The drift wave typically propagates across the pressure gradient and is perpendicular to the magnetic field. It can occur in relatively simple configurations such as in a column of plasma with a non-uniform density but a straight magnetic field. Drift wave turbulence is responsible for the transport of particles, energy and momentum across magnetic field lines.

The characteristic frequency associated with drift waves involving electron flow is given by
$$\omega^* = k_\perp \left(-\frac{k_BT_e}{eB_0}\frac{\nabla n_0}{n_0}\right) ,$$
where $k_\perp$ is the wavenumber perpendicular to the pressure gradient of the plasma, $k_B$ is the Boltzmann constant, $T_e$ is the electron temperature, $e$ is the elementary charge, $B_0$ is the background magnetic field and $\nabla n_0$ is the number density gradient of the plasma.
