= List of American Physical Society prizes and awards =

The American Physical Society gives out a number of awards for research excellence and conduct; topics include outstanding leadership, computational physics, lasers, mathematics, and more.

== Prizes ==
=== David Adler Lectureship Award in the Field of Materials Physics ===
The David Adler Lectureship Award in the Field of Materials Physics is a prize that has been awarded annually by the American Physical Society since 1988. The recipient is chosen for being "an outstanding contributor to the field of materials physics, who is noted for the quality of his/her research, review articles and lecturing." The prize is named after physicist David Adler with contributions to the endowment by friends of David Adler and Energy Conversion Devices, Inc. The winner receives a $5,000 honorarium.

=== Will Allis Prize for the Study of Ionized Gases ===
Will Allis Prize for the Study of Ionized Gases is awarded biannually "for outstanding contributions to understanding the physics of partially ionized plasmas and gases" in honour of Will Allis. The $10000 prize was founded in 1989 by contributions from AT&T, General Electric, GTE, International Business Machines, and Xerox Corporations.

=== Early Career Award for Soft Matter Research ===
This award recognizes outstanding and sustained contributions by an early-career researcher to the soft matter field.

=== LeRoy Apker Award ===
The LeRoy Apker Award was established in 1978 to recognize outstanding achievements in physics by undergraduate students. Two awards are presented each year, one to a student from a Ph.D. granting institution, and one to a student from a non-Ph.D. granting institution.

=== APS Medal for Exceptional Achievement in Research ===
The APS Medal for Exceptional Achievement in Research was established in 2016 to recognize contributions of the highest level that advance our knowledge and understanding of the physical universe. The medal carries with it a prize of $50,000 and is the largest APS prize to recognize the achievement of researchers from across all fields of physics. It is funded by a generous donation from Jay Jones, entrepreneur. Recipients to date are Edward Witten (2016), Daniel Kleppner (2017), Eugene Parker (2018), Bertrand Halperin (2019), Myriam Sarachik (2020), Gordon Baym (2021), Elliott H. Lieb (2022), Sidney R. Nagel (2023), Stuart Parkin (2024), Paul Corkum (2025), and Francis Halzen (2026).

=== Hans A. Bethe Prize ===
The Hans Bethe Prize is presented annually to recognize outstanding work in theory, experiment or observation in the areas of astrophysics, nuclear physics, nuclear astrophysics, or closely related fields. The prize was first awarded in 1998.

=== Tom W. Bonner Prize in Nuclear Physics ===
The Tom W. Bonner Prize in Nuclear Physics is an annual prize awarded by the Division of Nuclear Physics to recognize outstanding experimental research in nuclear physics. It was established in 1964.

=== Edward A. Bouchet Award ===
The Edward A. Bouchet Award was established in 1994 by the APS Committee on Minorities in physics to recognize and honor distinguished underrepresented minority physics researchers who have made significant contributions to physics research. This lectureship provides funding for Award recipients to conduct visits to institutions where the impact on minority students is significant, to deliver technical or topical lectures, and in some cases, to conduct informal discussions with faculty and students.

=== Herbert P. Broida Prize ===
The Herbert P. Broida Prize, established in 1979, is awarded every two years for outstanding experimental advances in the fields of atomic and molecular spectroscopy or chemical physics.

=== Oliver E. Buckley Condensed Matter Physics Prize ===
The Oliver E. Buckley Condensed Matter Prize is an annual prize with an award of $20,000 for "outstanding theoretical or experimental contributions to condensed matter physics". The prize is named after Oliver Ellsworth Buckley, a former president of AT&T Bell Laboratories, which endowed the prize in 1952.

=== Joseph A. Burton Forum Award ===
The Joseph A. Burton Forum Award was established in 1974 to recognize outstanding contributions to the public understanding or resolution of issues involving the interface of physics and society.

=== Stanley Corrsin Award ===
Stanley Corrsin Award is a $5000 prize given since 2011 "to recognize and encourage a particularly influential contribution to fundamental fluid dynamics."

=== Davisson–Germer Prize in Atomic or Surface Physics ===
The Davisson–Germer Prize in Atomic or Surface Physics is an annual prize for "outstanding work in atomic physics or surface physics". The prize is named after Clinton Davisson and Lester Germer, who first measured electron diffraction.

=== John Dawson Award for Excellence in Plasma Physics Research ===
The John Dawson Award for Excellence in Plasma Physics Research, established in 1981 but named after John M. Dawson in 2007, is an annual award that recognizes "a particular recent outstanding achievement in plasma physics research". The award carries a prize of $5000 divided among the year's recipients and an allowance for registration and travel to the APS Division of Plasma Physics Annual Meeting.

=== Max Delbruck Prize in Biological Physics ===
The Max Delbruck Prize recognizes and encourage outstanding achievement in biological physics research, and is one of the most prestigious international prizes in biological physics. It is awarded annually with a prize of $10000.

=== John H. Dillon Medal ===
The John H. Dillon Medal is an annual medal with an award of $2,000 for "outstanding accomplishment and unusual promise in research in polymer physics".

=== DQI Best Thesis Award ===
The DQI Best Thesis Award is presented by the APS Division of Quantum Information to recognize outstanding doctoral thesis research in quantum information science and technology. As part of the award process, a small group of finalists (typically 5 out of 100) is selected from the nominations and invited to present their work at the APS Global Physics Summit, after which one finalist is named the award recipient. The possible topics cover quantum information, quantum computing, quantum sensing and quantum communication.

=== Mildred Dresselhaus Prize in Nanoscience or Nanomaterials ===
Mildred Dresselhaus Prize in Nanoscience or Nanomaterials was first awarded in 2023. It honours the legacy of Mildred Dresselhaus, and is awarded for an "outstanding scientist in the areas of nanoscience or nanomaterials". The first recipient of the price was Eva Andrei.

=== George E. Duvall Shock Compression Science Award ===
George E. Duvall Shock Compression Science Award was established in 1987 "to recognize contributions to understanding condensed matter and non-linear physics through shock compression." It is awarded biannually.

=== Einstein Prize ===
The Einstein Prize was established in 1999 to recognize outstanding accomplishments in the field of gravitational physics. It is awarded in odd-numbered years.

=== Prize for a Faculty Member for Research in an Undergraduate Institution ===
Prize for a Faculty Member for Research in an Undergraduate Institution is awarded annually since 1986 to a "physicist whose research in an undergraduate setting has achieved wide recognition and contributed significantly to physics and who has contributed substantially to the professional development of undergraduate physics students".

=== Herman Feshbach Prize in Theoretical Nuclear Physics ===
The Herman Feshbach Prize in Theoretical Nuclear Physics was inaugurated in 2014 and is awarded annually to recognize and promote outstanding achievements in theoretical nuclear physics.

=== Fluid Dynamics Prize ===
The Fluid Dynamics Prize is a prize that has been awarded annually by the society since 1979. The recipient is chosen for "outstanding achievement in fluid dynamics research". As of 2007 the prize is valued at $10,000. In 2004, the Otto Laporte Award, another APS award on fluid dynamics, was merged into the Fluid Dynamics Prize.

=== Maria Goeppert-Mayer Award ===
The Maria Goeppert-Mayer Award recognizes and enhances outstanding achievements by women physicists in the early years of their careers and provides opportunities for them to present these achievements to others through public lectures.

=== Dannie Heineman Prize for Mathematical Physics ===
The Dannie Heineman Prize for Mathematical Physics is awarded annually since 1959 to recognize outstanding publications in the field of mathematical physics.

=== DPF Instrumentation Award ===
The Division of Particles and Fields Instrumentation Award was established in 2015 and is "bestowed annually to honor exceptional contributions to instrumentation advancing the field of particle physics through the invention, refinement, or application of instrumentation and detectors". Inaugural recipients were David Nygren and Veljko Radeka.

=== Richard A. Isaacson Award in Gravitational-Wave Science ===
Richard A. Isaacson Award in Gravitational-Wave Science is an annual award of $5000. It recognizes contributions in gravitational-wave physics and astrophysics, and technologies which enable them. It was first awarded in 2019.

=== Frank Isakson Prize for Optical Effects in Solids ===
The Frank Isakson Prize was established in 1979 to recognize outstanding optical research that leads to breakthroughs in the condensed matter sciences. The prize is awarded in even-numbered years.

=== Leo P. Kadanoff Prize ===
The Leo P. Kadanoff Prize, established in 2018, is awarded annually to recognize outstanding theoretical, experimental, or computational research in statistical and nonlinear physics.

=== Joseph F. Keithley Award For Advances in Measurement Science ===
The Joseph F. Keithley Award For Advances in Measurement Science recognizes physicists who have furthered the development of measurement techniques or equipment for the physics community that provides better measurements. Starting in 1998, the annual award consists of a $5,000 award and certificate.

=== Lev D. Landau and Lyman Spitzer Jr. Award ===
Lev D. Landau and Lyman Spitzer Jr. Award for Outstanding Contributions to Plasma Physics is "given to an individual or group of researchers for outstanding contributions in plasma physics and for advancing the collaboration between Europe and the United States of America." The $4000 prize is funded equally by the Plasma Physics Divisions of American Physical Society and European Physical Society.

=== Rolf Landauer and Charles H. Bennett Award in Quantum Computing ===
Rolf Landauer and Charles H. Bennett Award in Quantum Computing recognizes contributions in quantum information science. It was established in 2015.

=== Irving Langmuir Prize in Chemical Physics ===
The Irving Langmuir Prize in Chemical Physics is awarded annually to US residents, in even years by the American Chemical Society and in odd years by the American Physical Society. The award was established in 1931 to recognize and encourage outstanding interdisciplinary research in chemistry and physics, in the spirit of Nobel Prize-winning chemist Irving Langmuir.

=== Julius Edgar Lilienfeld Prize ===
APS has awarded the Julius Edgar Lilienfeld Prize annually since 1989, excepting 2002. The purpose of the prize is to recognize outstanding contributions to physics. Among the recipients are Michael Berry, Alan Guth, Stephen Hawking, and Frank Wilczek.

=== James Clerk Maxwell Prize ===
The James Clerk Maxwell Prize for Plasma Physics was established in 1975 by the Maxwell Technologies, Inc., in honor of the Scottish physicist, James Clerk Maxwell. The prize recognizes outstanding contributions to the field of plasma physics. The prize consists of $10,000 and a certificate citing the contributions made by the recipient. The prize is presented annually.

=== James C. McGroddy Prize for New Materials ===
The James C. McGroddy Prize for New Materials has been awarded annually since 1975 for "outstanding achievement in the science and application of new materials". Initially known as the International Prize for New Materials, the prize has been named for physicist James C. McGroddy since 1999.

=== Nicholas Metropolis Award for Outstanding Doctoral Thesis Work in Computational Physics ===
The Nicholas Metropolis Award recognizes outstanding doctoral thesis work in computational physics, rewarding both exceptional research and excellent written and oral communication of that research. Nicholas Metropolis was a Greek-American physicist who contributed to the Manhattan project and is best known for his work on Monte Carlo simulations. The Metropolis Award has been given annually since 1999.

=== Lars Onsager Prize in Statistical Physics ===
The Lars Onsager Prize recognizes outstanding research in theoretical statistical physics including the quantum fluids. The prize consists of $10,000 as well as a certificate citing the contribution made by the recipient. It is presented annually, beginning in 1997. The prize was endowed in 1993 by Drs. Russell and Marian Donnelly in memory of Lars Onsager and his passion for analytical results.

=== Abraham Pais Prize for History of Physics ===
The Abraham Pais Prize for History of Physics is given jointly by the American Physical Society and the American Institute of Physics for "outstanding scholarly achievements in the history of physics". The prize, named after physicist and historian Abraham Pais, has been awarded annually since 2005.

=== George E. Pake Prize ===
The George E. Pake Prize was established in 1983 to recognize outstanding work by physicists combining original research accomplishments with leadership in the management of research or development in industry. The prize is presented biennially in even-numbered years.

=== Panofsky Prize in Experimental Particle Physics ===
The Panofsky Prize is an annual prize, established in 1985, given to recognize and encourage outstanding achievements in experimental particle physics.

=== Francis M. Pipkin Award ===
The Francis M. Pipkin Award is a biennial prize established in 1997 to recognize the research achievements by an early-career physicist in precision measurement and fundamental physical constants and to encourage the dissemination of the research.

=== Earle K. Plyler Prize for Molecular Spectroscopy & Dynamics ===
The Earle K. Plyler Prize for Molecular Spectroscopy was established in 1976 and is awarded annually to recognize notable contributions to the field of molecular spectroscopy and dynamics.

=== Polymer Physics Prize ===
The Polymer Physics Prize is awarded annually since 1962 for outstanding achievements in polymer physics research.

=== I. I. Rabi Prize in Atomic, Molecular, and Optical Physics ===
The I. I. Rabi Prize in Atomic, Molecular, and Optical Physics was established in 1989 and is awarded biennially to recognize outstanding research by an early-career physicist in atomic, molecular, and optical physics.

=== Aneesur Rahman Prize for Computational Physics ===
The Aneesur Rahman Prize for Computational Physics was established in 1992 with support from IBM Corporation. It recognizes outstanding work in computational physics. It is awarded annually with a value of $5000 and is open to scientists of all nationalities. The winner delivers the Rahman lecture.

=== Norman F. Ramsey Prize ===
The Norman F. Ramsey Prize in Atomic, Molecular and Optical Physics, and in Precision Tests of Fundamental Laws and Symmetries recognizes achievements in the two fields of Norman Ramsey: AMO physics and in precisions tests of fundamental laws and symmetries. It was established in 2017.

=== Andrei Sakharov Prize ===
The Andrei Sakharov Prize was established to recognize "outstanding leadership and/or achievements of scientists in upholding human rights." The prize is named in recognition of the courageous and effective work of the Soviet nuclear physicist Andrei Sakharov on behalf of human rights, to the detriment of his own scientific career and despite the loss of his own personal freedom.

=== J. J. Sakurai Prize ===
The J. J. Sakurai Prize for Theoretical Particle Physics is presented by the American Physical Society at its annual April Meeting, and honors outstanding achievement in particle physics theory. The prize, considered one of the most prestigious in physics, consists of a monetary award, a certificate citing the contributions recognized by the award, and a travel allowance for the recipient to attend the presentation. The award is endowed by the family and friends of particle physicist J. J. Sakurai. The prize has been awarded annually since 1985.

=== Arthur L. Schawlow Prize in Laser Science ===
The Arthur L. Schawlow Prize in Laser Science is an annual award established in 1991 to recognize outstanding contributions to basic research which uses lasers to advance the knowledge of the fundamental physical properties of materials and their interaction with light.

=== Leo Szilard Lectureship Award ===
The Leo Szilard Lectureship Award was established in 1974 in commemoration of physicist Leo Szilard. It is presented annually for outstanding accomplishments by international physicists to promote the use of physics for the benefit of society.

=== George E. Valley, Jr. Prize ===
George E. Valley, Jr. Prize was established in 2000 to "recognize an early-career individual for an outstanding scientific contribution to physics that is deemed to have significant potential for a dramatic impact on the field."

=== John Wheatley Award ===
Established in 1991 "to honor and recognize the dedication of physicists who have made contributions to the development of physics in countries of the third world" with the support of the Forum on International Physics.

=== Robert R. Wilson Prize ===
The Robert R. Wilson Prize for Achievement in the Physics of Particle Accelerators was established in 1987 "to recognize and encourage outstanding achievement in the physics of particle accelerators. The prize consists of $10,000, an allowance for travel to the meeting at which the prize is awarded and a certificate citing the contributions made by the recipient. It is presented annually." The prize is named after Robert R. Wilson, the first director of Fermilab.

== See also ==
- List of physics awards
