= Debye sheath =

Plasma layer with a positive charge

The Debye sheath (also electrostatic sheath) is a layer in a plasma which has a greater density of positive ions, and hence an overall excess positive charge, that balances an opposite negative charge on the surface of a material with which it is in contact. The thickness of such a layer is several Debye lengths thick, a value whose size depends on various characteristics of plasma (e.g. temperature, density, etc.).

A Debye sheath arises in a plasma because the electrons usually have a temperature on the order of magnitude or greater than that of the ions and are much lighter. Consequently, they are faster than the ions by at least a factor of $\sqrt{m_\mathrm{i}/m_\mathrm{e}}$. At the interface to a material surface, therefore, the electrons will fly out of the plasma, charging the surface negative relative to the bulk plasma. Due to Debye shielding, the scale length of the transition region will be the Debye length $\lambda_\mathrm{D}$. As the potential increases, more and more electrons are reflected by the sheath potential. An equilibrium is finally reached when the potential difference is a few times the electron temperature.

The Debye sheath is the transition from a plasma to a solid surface. Similar physics is involved between two plasma regions that have different characteristics; the transition between these regions is known as a double layer, and features one positive, and one negative layer.

== Description ==
Positive ion sheaths around grid wires in a thermionic gas tube, where ⊕ represents a positive charge (not to scale) (After Langmuir, 1929)

Sheaths were first described by American physicist Irving Langmuir. In 1923 he wrote:

"Electrons are repelled from the negative electrode while positive ions are drawn towards it. Around each negative electrode there is thus a sheath of definite thickness containing only positive ions and neutral atoms. [..] Electrons are reflected from the outside surface of the sheath while all positive ions which reach the sheath are attracted to the electrode. [..] it follows directly that no change occurs in the positive ion current reaching the electrode. The electrode is in fact perfectly screened from the discharge by the positive ion sheath, and its potential cannot influence the phenomena occurring in the arc, nor the current flowing to the electrode."

Langmuir and co-author Albert W. Hull further described a sheath formed in a thermionic valve:

"Figure 1 shows graphically the condition that exists in such a tube containing mercury vapor. The space between filament and plate is filled with a mixture of electrons and positive ions, in nearly equal numbers, to which has been given the name "plasma". A wire immersed in the plasma, at zero potential with respect to it, will absorb every ion and electron that strikes it. Since the electrons move about 600 times as fast as the ions, 600 times as many electrons will strike the wire as ions. If the wire is insulated it must assume such a negative potential that it receives equal numbers of electrons and ions, that is, such a potential that it repels all but 1 in 600 of the electrons headed for it."
"Suppose that this wire, which we may take to be part of a grid, is made still more negative with a view to controlling the current through the tube. It will now repel all the electrons headed for it, but will receive all the positive ions that fly toward it. There will thus be a region around the wire which contains positive ions and no electrons, as shown diagrammatically in Fig. 1. The ions are accelerated as they approach the negative wire, and there will exist a potential gradient in this sheath, as we may call it, of positive ions, such that the potential is less and less negative as we recede from the wire, and at a certain distance is equal to the potential of the plasma. This distance we define as the boundary of the sheath. Beyond this distance there is no effect due to the potential of the wire."

== Mathematical treatment ==
=== The planar sheath equation ===
The quantitative physics of the Debye sheath is determined by four phenomena:

Energy conservation of the ions: If we assume for simplicity cold ions of mass $m_\mathrm{i}$ entering the sheath with a velocity $u_0$, having charge opposite to the electron, conservation of energy in the sheath potential requires

$$\frac{1}{2}m_\mathrm{i}\,u(x)^2 = \frac{1}{2}m_\mathrm{i}\,u_0^2 - e\,\varphi(x)$$,

where $e$ is the charge of the electron taken positively, i.e. $e=1.602$ x $10^{-19}$ $\mathrm{C}$.

Ion continuity: In the steady state, the ions do not build up anywhere, so the flux is everywhere the same:

$$n_0\,u_0 = n_\mathrm{i}(x)\,u(x)$$.

Boltzmann relation for the electrons: Since most of the electrons are reflected, their density is given by

$$n_\mathrm{e}(x) = n_0 \exp\Big(\frac{e\,\varphi(x)}{k_\mathrm{B}T_\mathrm{e}}\Big)$$.

Poisson's equation: The curvature of the electrostatic potential is related to the net charge density as follows:

$$\frac{d^2\varphi(x)}{dx^2} = \frac{e (n_\mathrm{e}(x)-n_\mathrm{i}(x))}{\epsilon_0}$$.

Combining these equations and writing them in terms of the dimensionless potential, position, and ion speed,

$$\chi(\xi) = -\frac{e\varphi(\xi)}{k_\mathrm{B}T_\mathrm{e}}$$

$$\xi = \frac{x}{\lambda_\mathrm{D}}$$

$$\mathfrak{M} = \frac{u_\mathrm{o}}{(k_\mathrm{B}T_\mathrm{e}/m_\mathrm{i})^{1/2}}$$

we arrive at the sheath equation:

$$\chi'' = \left( 1 + \frac{2\chi}{\mathfrak{M}^2} \right)^{-1/2} - e^{-\chi}$$.

=== Bohm sheath criterion ===
The sheath equation can be integrated once by multiplying by $\chi'$:

$$\int_0^\xi \chi' \chi''\,d\xi_1 =
\int_0^\xi \left( 1 + \frac{2\chi}{\mathfrak{M}^2} \right)^{-1/2} \chi' \,d\xi_1 -
\int_0^\xi e^{-\chi} \chi'\,d\xi_1$$

At the sheath edge ($\xi = 0$), we can define the potential to be zero ($\chi = 0$) and assume that the electric field is also zero ($\chi'=0$). With these boundary conditions, the integrations yield

$$\frac{1}{2}\chi'^2 = \mathfrak{M}^2 \left[ \left( 1 + \frac{2\chi}{\mathfrak{M}^2} \right)^{1/2} - 1 \right] + e^{-\chi} - 1$$

This is easily rewritten as an integral in closed form, although one that can only be solved numerically. Nevertheless, an important piece of information can be derived analytically. Since the left-hand-side is a square, the right-hand-side must also be non-negative for every value of $\chi$, in particular for small values. Looking at the Taylor expansion around $\chi = 0$, we see that the first term that does not vanish is the quadratic one, so that we can require

$$\frac{1}{2}\chi^2\left( -\frac{1}{\mathfrak{M}^2} + 1 \right) \ge 0$$,

or

$$\mathfrak{M}^2 \ge 1$$,

or

$$u_0 \ge (k_\mathrm{B}T_\mathrm{e}/m_\mathrm{i})^{1/2}$$.

This inequality is known as the Bohm sheath criterion after its discoverer, David Bohm who discussed it in 1949. If the ions are entering the sheath too slowly, the sheath potential will "eat" its way into the plasma to accelerate them. Ultimately a so-called pre-sheath will develop with a potential drop on the order of $(k_\mathrm{B}T_\mathrm{e}/2e)$ and a scale determined by the physics of the ion source (often the same as the dimensions of the plasma). Normally the Bohm criterion will hold with equality, but there are some situations where the ions enter the sheath with supersonic speed.

=== Child–Langmuir law ===
Although the sheath equation must generally be integrated numerically, we can find an approximate solution analytically by neglecting the $e^{-\chi}$ term. This amounts to neglecting the electron density in the sheath, or only analyzing that part of the sheath where there are no electrons. For a "floating" surface, i.e. one that draws no net current from the plasma, this is a useful if rough approximation. For a surface biased strongly negative so that it draws the ion saturation current, the approximation is very good. It is customary, although not strictly necessary, to further simplify the equation by assuming that $2\chi/\mathfrak{M}^2$ is much larger than unity. Then the sheath equation takes on the simple form

$$\chi'' = \frac{\mathfrak{M}}{(2\chi)^{1/2}}$$.

As before, we multiply by $\chi'$ and integrate to obtain

$$\frac{1}{2}\chi'^2 = \mathfrak{M} (2\chi)^{1/2}$$,

or

$$\chi^{-1/4}\chi' = 2^{3/4} \mathfrak{M}^{1/2}$$.

This is easily integrated over ξ to yield

$$\frac{4}{3}\chi_\mathrm{w}^{3/4} = 2^{3/4} \mathfrak{M}^{1/2} d$$,

where $\chi_\mathrm{w}$ is the (normalized) potential at the wall (relative to the sheath edge), and d is the thickness of the sheath. Changing back to the variables $u_0$ and $\varphi$ and noting that the ion current into the wall is $J=e\,n_0\,u_0$, we have

$$J = \frac{4}{9} \left(\frac{2e}{m_i}\right)^{1/2} \frac{|\varphi_w|^{3/2}}{4\pi d^2}$$.

This equation is known as Child's law, after Clement D. Child (1868–1933), who first published it in 1911, or as the Child–Langmuir law, honoring as well Irving Langmuir, who discovered it independently and published in 1913. It was first used to give the space-charge-limited current in a vacuum diode with electrode spacing d. It can also be inverted to give the thickness of the Debye sheath as a function of the voltage drop by setting $J=j_\mathrm{ion}^\mathrm{sat}$:

$$d = \frac{2}{3} \left(\frac{2e}{m_\mathrm{i}}\right)^{1/4} \frac{|\varphi_\mathrm{w}|^{3/4}}{2\sqrt{\pi j_\mathrm{ion}^\mathrm{sat}}}$$.

In recent years, the Child-Langmuir (CL) law have been revised as reported in two review papers.

== See also ==
- Ambipolar diffusion
- Double layer (plasma), especially the section Current-carrying double layers formed by single, zero temperature beams
