= Helander =

Helander is a surname. Notable people with the surname include:

- Arne Anders Vilhem Helander (born 1941), Finnish architect
- Benjamin Helander (born 1998), Finnish handball player
- Bernhard Helander (1958–2001), writer on Somalia
- Bruce Helander (born 1947), American artist
- Colbjørn Helander (1911–1962), Norwegian screenwriter and translator
- Dick Helander (1896–1978), Swedish bishop
- Filip Helander (born 1993), Swedish footballer
- Hans Peter Helander (born 1951), Swedish hockey player
- Jalmari Helander (born 1976), Finnish film director and screenwriter
- Keith Helander (1892–1960), New Zealand rugby league player
- Marja Helander (born 1965), Finnish-Sámi photographer, artist and filmmaker
- Olle Helander (1919–1976), Swedish music journalist
- Per Helander (born 1967), Swedish plasma physicist
- Tuija Helander (born 1961), Finnish hurdler
- Vilhelm Helander (1941–2025), Finnish architect and academic
