= Donato Palumbo =

Italian physicist

Donato Palumbo (16 July 1921 – 9 February 2011) was an Italian physicist best known as the leader of the European Atomic Energy Community (Euratom) fusion research program from its formation in 1958 to his retirement in 1986. He was a key force in the development of the tokamak during the 1970s and 80s, contributing several papers on plasma confinement in these devices and leading the JET fusion reactor program, which as of 2021, retains the record for the closest approach to breakeven, the ratio between the produced fusion power and the power used to heat it. He is referred to as the founding father of the European fusion program.

== Early life ==
Donato was born in Trapani to father Giuseppe, a doctor, and mother Rosalia Di Lorenzo. In 1939 he won first place in a placement contest for Scuola Normale Superiore di Pisa in physics, graduating in 1944. He became an assistant professor at the University of Palermo in physics, spectroscopy and electrochemistry. He became a full professor in general physics in 1954 and higher physics in 1958. He also taught courses in economics and medicine. In 1946 he spent a year at the Sorbonne and the Institut Henri Poincaré, and about six months at the University of Bristol in 1957. During this period he published about 25 papers in various journals.

== Euratom fusion program ==
In 1958, Palumbo visited the international Atoms for Peace show in Geneva where the topic of nuclear fusion was first widely declassified and the research efforts in the US, UK and USSR were published. Only a year earlier, Italian commissioner Enrico Medi of the recently formed European Atomic Energy Community (Euratom) asked Palumbo to move to Brussels to lead the fusion part of the EURATOM research program. It seemed fission energy might be outdated in the near future and he formed plans for a fusion power effort.

Palumbo took a unique approach to the problem, one that is widely credited with its success. The fission program within Euratom was formed along classical lines with the creation of new joint labs run directly by Euratom, that later were integrated in the Joint Research Center. For the fusion program, Palumbo came up with the concept of contracts of association signed between EURATOM and national research institutions of the Member States. Existing national labs would compete for development projects. Successful bids would be funded at 25%, leaving the rest to the lab's existing national funding. This meant the labs remained in charge of their research directions, freely choosing to bid on or ignore any project that came from Brussels.

The first formal agreement under this framework was made with the French Commissariat à l'énergie atomique in 1959, followed by the Italian National Committee for Nuclear Research in 1960 and the German Max Planck Institut für Plasma Physik in 1961. They were eventually joined by the Dutch and Belgian labs, and then, in 1973, by the UK and Denmark in spite of neither being a member of the European Community at the time. By the time he retired, there were 13 nations in the group. This led in 1999 to the creation of the European Fusion Development Agreement.

By the late 1960s, after 15 years of effort around the world, fusion appeared simply to not work. The problem was that all machines suffered from problems where the fuel would leak out of the reactors faster that it took for the fusion reactions to occur, meaning there was no way they could produce net power. The entire field entered what was known as "the doldrums", and the national labs saw their budgets being repeatedly cut as the possibility of success seemed increasingly remote.

=== Switch to tokamaks ===
Soviet scientists reported in 1968 the superiority of the toroidal configuration for magnetic plasma confinement. The publication of the results from the T-3 and TM-3 tokamaks reenergized the fusion field. This design, a simple but important variation on previously studied concepts, demonstrated confinement times at least fifty times better than what was predicted by Bohm diffusion that stymied earlier approaches.

Palumbo, who long favored toroidal machines like the tokamak, started a new program where Euratom would fund up to 45% of the construction costs of a wave of new machines. Among the successes of this program was the French Tokamak de Fontenay aux Roses, for a time the most powerful tokamak in the world, the German Pulsator and Asdex, the later of which achieved a major advance in the discovery of the so-called "h-mode", and the Italian Frascati Tokamak, which explored the advantages of highly compact layouts. These machines led to a second wave of construction which included the French Tore Supra, UK Divertor Injection Tokamak (DITE), the German Asdex Upgrade and the Frascati Tokamak Upgrade (FTU).

Even in the earliest days of Palumbo's program, he planned for a much larger machine with the goal of reaching breakeven. Planning for this system can be traced to 1971, where the broad outline for a large system that would be paid for 80% by Euratom and 20% by all of the labs collectively was produced. After several years of discussion, this emerged as the Joint European Torus (JET) program in 1977. In order to provide "high efficiency with minimum bureaucracy", leadership was devolved from Euratom to the newly-formed consortium, JET Joint Undertaking. JET began operations in 1984 and underwent several major changes over the next decade. It reached its near-final form in 1991, and spent the next six years setting several major records that remain to this day.

During the opening ceremonies, Elizabeth II asked how he managed to wrangle so many countries to create JET, he replied "By disobeying, your Majesty." Unknown to Palumbo, the Queen discussed the matter with Étienne Davignon, vice-president of the European Commission, passing along Palumbo concerns that the fusion program was not receiving enough funding. When Palumbo repeated his concerns to Paul Vandenplas at a meeting the next year, they gained the ear of Baudouin of Belgium, and he was called out on the carpet by Davignon and told "The next time I hear from a Sovereign that you are concerned by the fusion budget, you will be fired."

Even as JET was being built, Palumbo set his eyes on future projects. In 1980 he was key in the creation of the INTOR project, a worldwide effort to build a demonstration power plant. At the same time, consideration was given to an intermediate design, Next European Torus, or NET. The NET group was created in 1983. In 1985, meetings between Mikhail Gorbachev and François Mitterrand opened the possibility of Soviet involvement in INTOR, which expanded when Gorbachev and Ronald Reagan met later that year in Geneva. What was once NET and INTOR became the new ITER.

In addition to his work organizing the Euratom program, Palumbo also studied the topic of plasma stability. In 1967 he developed the concept of isodynamic equilibrium, an exact toroidal solution for plasma stability. In 1971 he published a similar treatment for magnetohydrodynamics in a torus.

== Personal life ==
He married Maria Clelia Cuccia on 30 April 1952 and had three children, Rosalia, Giuseppe and Carlo. He died in Salaparuta on 9 February 2011.
