= Hannes Alfvén Prize =

- Country: Europe
- Presented by: Plasma Physics Division, European Physical Society
- First award: 2000
- Website: plasma.ciemat.es/eps/awards/alfven-prize

The Hannes Alfvén Prize is a prize established by the European Physical Society (EPS) Plasma Physics Division in 2000. The Prize is awarded annually by the European Physical Society at the EPS Conference on Plasma Physics for outstanding work in the field of plasma physics: "for achievements which have shaped the plasma physics field or are expected to do so in future."

It is named after the Swedish physicist Hannes Alfvén.

== List of winners ==
Year	Recipient	Institution	Citation	Ref.
2000	Radu Bălescu	Université Libre de Bruxelles	"for his outstanding scientific work in the field of statistical physics of charged particles and of controlled fusion."	
2001	Vitaly Shafranov	Kurchatov Institute	"for his theoretical research on plasma equilibrium and stability and his outstanding contribution to the physics of magnetically confined toroidal plasmas."	
2002	Marshall Rosenbluth	University of California, San Diego	"for his seminal theoretical contributions since the earliest days of fusion research in virtually all aspects of fusion plasma sciences which now form the basis of modern plasma physics."	
2003	Vladimir Evgenievitch Fortov		"for his seminal contributions in the area of non-ideal plasmas and strongly coupled Coulomb systems, and for his pioneering work on the generation and investigation of plasmas under extreme conditions."	
2004	John W. Connor	Culham Centre for Fusion Energy	"for their seminal contributions to a wide range of issues of fundamental importance to the success of magnetic confinement fusion, including: the development of gyro-kinetic theory; the prediction of the bootstrap current; dimensionless scaling laws; pressure-limiting instabilities, and micro-stability and transport theory."	
2004	Robert J. Hastie	Culham Centre for Fusion Energy	"for their seminal contributions to a wide range of issues of fundamental importance to the success of magnetic confinement fusion, including: the development of gyro-kinetic theory; the prediction of the bootstrap current; dimensionless scaling laws; pressure-limiting instabilities, and micro-stability and transport theory."	
2004	John B. Taylor	Culham Centre for Fusion Energy & University of Texas at Austin	"for their seminal contributions to a wide range of issues of fundamental importance to the success of magnetic confinement fusion, including: the development of gyro-kinetic theory; the prediction of the bootstrap current; dimensionless scaling laws; pressure-limiting instabilities, and micro-stability and transport theory."	
2005	Malcolm Haines	Imperial College London	"for their major contributions to the development of the multi-wire array in Z-pinch pulse-power physics; the x-ray yield was rapidly increased to the level of 2 MJ starting with pioneering work on the 'Angara' facilities in Russia, through the 'Saturn' project in the Sandia Laboratories to the present 'Z' device also in Sandia, strongly supported by the rapid evolution of the underlying theory of cylindrical wire-array liner compression."	
2005	Tom Sanford	Sandia National Laboratories	"for their major contributions to the development of the multi-wire array in Z-pinch pulse-power physics; the x-ray yield was rapidly increased to the level of 2 MJ starting with pioneering work on the 'Angara' facilities in Russia, through the 'Saturn' project in the Sandia Laboratories to the present 'Z' device also in Sandia, strongly supported by the rapid evolution of the underlying theory of cylindrical wire-array liner compression."	
2005	Valentin Smirnov	Kurchatov Institute	"for their major contributions to the development of the multi-wire array in Z-pinch pulse-power physics; the x-ray yield was rapidly increased to the level of 2 MJ starting with pioneering work on the 'Angara' facilities in Russia, through the 'Saturn' project in the Sandia Laboratories to the present 'Z' device also in Sandia, strongly supported by the rapid evolution of the underlying theory of cylindrical wire-array liner compression."	
2006	Paul-Henri Rebut	Culham Centre for Fusion Energy & ITER	"for his pioneering contributions to many topics in magnetic confinement theory and in the design of tokamak devices, many of which are now implemented in the ITER design."	
2007	Friedrich Wagner	Max Planck Institute for Plasma Physics	"for his continuing outstanding contributions to research into fusion by magnetic confinement."	
2008	Liu Chen	University of California, Irvine & Zhejiang University	"for his many seminal works on Alfvén wave physics in both laboratory and space plasmas, for his continuing contribution of new ideas which have fostered creativity and promoted cross-fertilization in both these areas of research, and for his fundamental contributions in educating a new generation of researchers for which he is an example to emulate."	
2009	Jürgen Meyer-ter-Vehn	Max Planck Institute of Quantum Optics	"for his seminal theoretical work in the fields of inertial confinement fusion (ICF), relativistic laser–plasma interaction and laser wakefield electron acceleration."	
2010	Allen Boozer	Columbia University	"for the formulation and practical application of criteria allowing stellarators to have good fast-particle and neoclassical energy confinement."	
2010	Jürgen Nührenberg	Max Planck Institute for Plasma Physics & University of Griefswald	"for the formulation and practical application of criteria allowing stellarators to have good fast-particle and neoclassical energy confinement."	
2011	Patrick Diamond	University of California, San Diego	"for laying the foundations of modern numerical transport simulations and key contributions on self-generated zonal flows and flow shear decorrelation mechanisms which form the basis of modern turbulence in plasmas."	
2011	Akira Hasegawa	Osaka University	"for laying the foundations of modern numerical transport simulations and key contributions on self-generated zonal flows and flow shear decorrelation mechanisms which form the basis of modern turbulence in plasmas."	
2011	Kunioki Mima	The Graduate School for the Creation of New Photonics Industries	"for laying the foundations of modern numerical transport simulations and key contributions on self-generated zonal flows and flow shear decorrelation mechanisms which form the basis of modern turbulence in plasmas."	
2012	Eugene N. Parker	University of Chicago	"for his theoretical discovery of the transonically expanding atmosphere in cool stars as a basic phenomenon in the magnetic astrophysical cosmos."	
2013	Miklos Porkolab	Massachusetts Institute of Technology	"for his seminal contributions to the physics of plasma waves and his key role in the development of fusion energy."	
2014	Patrick Mora	Ecole Polytechnique	"for decisive results in the field of laser-produced plasma physics, in particular for illuminating descriptions of laser light absorption in plasmas, electron heat transport in steep temperature gradients and plasma expansion dynamics into vacuum."	
2015	Nathaniel J. Fisch	Princeton Plasma Physics Laboratory	"for his contributions to the understanding of plasma wave‐particle interactions and their applications to efficiently driving currents with radio‐frequency waves."	
2016	Sergei Bulanov	National Institute of Radiological Sciences & Prokhorov Institute of General Physics	"for their experimental and theoretical contributions to the development of large-scale next-step devices in high-temperature plasma physics research,"	
2016	Hartmut Zohm	Max Planck Institute for Plasma Physics	"for their experimental and theoretical contributions to the development of large-scale next-step devices in high-temperature plasma physics research,"	
2017	Ksenia Aleksandrovna Razumova	Kurchatov Institute	"for obtaining, for the first time, a macroscopically stable plasma column in a tokamak configuration; this led to the world-wide programme of experimental exploration and development of the tokamak concept for magnetic confinement fusion."	
2018	Tony Bell	University of Oxford	"for seminal contributions covering cosmic ray acceleration by shocks, magnetic field amplification by cosmic rays, flux limited electron transport, generation of magnetic field by laser‑produced energetic electrons, collimation of electron beams for inertial fusion, prolific production of electron‑positron pairs."	
2019	Victor Malka	Laboratoire d'Optique Appliquée & Weizmann Institute of Science	"for major contributions to the development of compact laser-plasma accelerators, and to their innovative applications to science and society, which span ultra-fast phenomena, accelerator physics, medicine, radiobiology, chemistry and material science."	
2019	Toshiki Tajima	University of California, Irvine	"for seminal, broad, and novel contributions to plasma physics and plasma-based accelerator physics, including the concept of laser wakefield acceleration."	
2020	Annick Pouquet	University of Colorado Boulder	"for fundamental contributions to quantifying energy transfer in magneto-fluid turbulence... [which] include predicting the inverse cascade of magnetic helicity, extending the accessible frontier of nonlinear numerical computations, and key steps forward in the analytical theory of turbulence. ... [Pouquet's] work has facilitated remarkable advances in the understanding of turbulence in astrophysical and space plasmas."	
2021	Sergei Igorevich Krasheninnikov	University of California, San Diego	"for seminal contributions to the plasma physics of the scrape-off layer and divertor in magnetically confined fusion (MCF) experiments, including the physics of "blobs", divertor plasma detachment, and dust, together with atomic physics effects."	
2022	Xavier Garbet	CEA	"for important contributions to the theory of the mesoscopic dynamics of magnetically confined fusion (MCF) plasmas: specifically, to understanding turbulence spreading, flux-driven gyrokinetic simulations, transport barriers, up-gradient transport and edge instabilities."	
2023	Pisin Chen	National Taiwan University	for proposing, demonstrating and conducting impressive ground-breaking experiments on plasma wakefield accelerators driven by particle beams, thus firmly establishing the new concept of plasma acceleration and their applications in the scientific community.	
2023	James Benjamin Rosenzweig	University of California, Los Angeles	for proposing, demonstrating and conducting impressive ground-breaking experiments on plasma wakefield accelerators driven by particle beams, thus firmly establishing the new concept of plasma acceleration and their applications in the scientific community.	
2023	Chandrashekhar Janardan Joshi	University of California, Los Angeles	for proposing, demonstrating and conducting impressive ground-breaking experiments on plasma wakefield accelerators driven by particle beams, thus firmly establishing the new concept of plasma acceleration and their applications in the scientific community.	
2024	Tünde Fülöp	Chalmers University of Technology	for outstanding contributions to theoretical plasma physics, yielding groundbreaking results that significantly impact the understanding and optimization of magnetically confined fusion plasmas.	
2024	Per Helander	Max Planck Institute for Plasma Physics	for outstanding contributions to theoretical plasma physics, yielding groundbreaking results that significantly impact the understanding and optimization of magnetically confined fusion plasmas.	
2025	Michel Koenig	Laboratoire pour l'Utilisation des Lasers Intenses	"for outstanding and continuous contributions to the experimental study of laser-plasma interactions applied in the domain of laboratory astrophysics, of high-energy density physics, and of inertial confinement fusion."	
2026	Philippa Browning	University of Manchester	"for innovative results that bridge astrophysical and laboratory plasmas addressing, through analytical insight and magnetohydrodynamic/kinetic modelling, the fundamental features of solar coronal heating, the onset of nanoflares, particle acceleration in magnetic reconnection, and relaxation of magnetic configurations in fusion devices."	

== See also ==
- James Clerk Maxwell Prize for Plasma Physics
- List of physics awards
- List of prizes named after people
