= Andrey Gaponov-Grekhov =

Soviet Russian physicist (1926–2022)

Andrei Gaponov-Grekhov
- Андрей Гапонов-Грехов
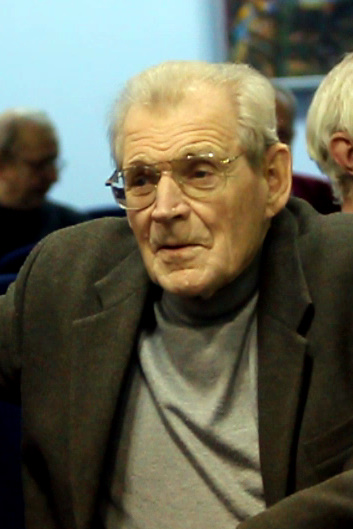
- Gaponov-Grekhov in 2010
- Born: 7 June 1926; Moscow, Russian SFSR, USSR
- Died: 2 June 2022 (aged 95); Moscow, Russia
- Citizenship: USSR, Russia
- Awards: Demidov Prize (1995); Lomonosov Gold Medal (2000)
- Scientific career
- Fields: physics
- Institutions: UNN
- Doctoral advisor: Aleksandr Andronov

Andrei Viktorovich Gaponov-Grekhov (Russian: Андрей Викторович Гапонов-Грехов; 7 June 1926 – 2 June 2022) was a Russian (Soviet) physicist, a Full Member of the USSR Academy of Sciences (1968, a Full Member of the Russian Academy of Sciences since 1991), the founder of the Institute of Applied Physics in Nizhny Novgorod, and its first director in 1976–2003.

Hero of Socialist Labor (1986). Laureate of two State Prizes of the USSR (1967 and 1983) and the State Prize of the Russian Federation (2003).

== Biography ==
Andrey V. Gaponov-Grekhov was born on 7 June 1926 into a Moscow family of physicists. His parents Maria T. Grekhova and Viktor I. Gaponov met when studying at the Moscow State University. Their son received a double surname at birth. In the early 1930s, his parents moved to Gorky (now Nizhny Novgorod), where they started doing research on radiophysics. Due to the efforts of Maria Grekhova during the World War II, the Physical-Technical Research Institute of the Gorky State University was recreated and the Faculty of Radiophysics as part of the university was founded. In the mid-1950s, she established the Radiophysical Research Institute (NIRFI) in Gorky.

A. V. Gaponov-Grekhov followed his parents' footsteps: after graduating from school, he entered the special faculty of the Gorky Industrial Institute. After completing two courses, he transferred to the Faculty of Radiophysics of the Gorky State University, from which he graduated in 1949. The same year, he became a PhD student of Academician Aleksandr A. Andronov. A. A. Andronov invited him to defend his PhD thesis on the general theory of electromechanical systems. A. V. Gaponov-Grekhov was engaged in solving this problem for 6 years and in 1955 defended his PhD thesis on "Electromechanical systems with sliding contacts and dynamic theory of electrical machines" at the Leningrad Polytechnic Institute. For these thesis A. V. Gaponov-Grekhov was immediately awarded the degree of a Doctor of Sciences in Physics and Mathematics due to the significance of his work.

After graduation, he worked as a lecturer at the Gorky Polytechnic Institute (1952–1955), and after receiving his doctorate he worked at Physical-Technical Research Institute of the Gorky State University until 1977, while remaining a professor at the Polytechnic Institute.

On 26 June 1964, A.V. Gaponov-Grekhov became a corresponding member of the USSR Academy of Sciences in the Division of General and Applied Physics, and on 26 November 1968 he became a full member of the academy. Since 1966 he worked as a deputy director of the NIRFI. In 1976, he became the Director of the Institute of Applied Physics of the USSR Academy of Sciences (IAP RAS) and headed it until 2003. In 2003–2015, he was a scientific supervisor of the IAP RAS and in the last years of his life, a counsellor of the Russian Academy of Sciences.

A. V. Gaponov-Grekhov was the editor-in-chief of the journal Bulletin of the Russian Academy of Sciences: Physics, a member of the editorial boards of the journals Plasma Physics Reports, Radiophysics and Quantum Electronics, Acoustical Physics, JETP, Technical Physics, and Optoelectronics, Instrumentation and Data Processing.

A. V. Gaponov-Grekhov's younger brother was Sergey V. Gaponov (1937–2024), also a physicist, a Full Member of the Russian Academy of Sciences.

A. V. Gaponov-Grekhov died in Nizhny Novgorod on 2 June 2022 at the age of 95.

== Scientific activity ==
Since the late 1950s, A. V. Gaponov-Grekhov has been engaged in intense research in the field of nonlinear wave processes, as well as in solving the problem of generating and amplifying high-power high-frequency electromagnetic oscillations in the millimeter and submillimeter wavelength ranges. He was one of the pioneers in studying the phenomenon of shock electromagnetic waves.

A. V. Gaponov-Grekhov developed the theory of stimulated radiation of classical nonlinear oscillators and the principle of generation and amplification of electromagnetic waves by flows of excited non-isochronous oscillators based on this theory. Gyrotrons, the devices developed on these principles, have found application in thermonuclear reactors and tracking of space objects.

A. V. Gaponov-Grekhov is the author of about 150 scientific papers on electrodynamics and microwave electronics, high-power electronics, plasma physics, nonlinear optics, physics of the millimeter and submillimeter electromagnetic waves, nonlinear wave physics, and analytical dynamics. He formulated the basic equations of the general analytical theory of electromechanical systems. He also predicted (in 1959) the effect of stimulated emission of a flow of excited non-isochronous oscillators and studied stimulated cyclotron radiation. On the basis of these works, together with his co-workers, he created cyclotron resonance masers, which are high-power generators of the millimeter and submillimeter electromagnetic waves. A. V. Gaponov-Grekhov studied the localization and acceleration of the plasma by high-frequency fields, introduced (together with M. A. Miller) the concept of a high-frequency potential in the plasma, analyzed the interaction of intense electromagnetic radiation with the plasma, heating of a dense plasma by intense electromagnetic radiation, shock electromagnetic waves, self-oscillating systems, etc.

=== Major works ===
- A. V. Gaponov-Grekhov, Electromechanical systems with sliding contacts and dynamic theory of electrical machines. In memory of A.A. Andronov, Akad. Nauk SSSR, Moscow (1955).
- A. V. Gaponov-Grekhov, Interaction of non-straight electron flows with electromagnetic waves in transmission lines, Izv. VUZov. Radiofizika, 2, No. 3,. 450-462 (1959).
- A. V. Gaponov-Grekhov and M. A. Miller, On potential wells for charged particles in high-frequency fields, Zh. Eksp. Teor. Fiz., 34, No. 2, 242-243 (1958).
- A. V. Gaponov-Grekhov and M. A. Miller, On application of moving high-frequency potential wells for acceleration of charged particles, Zh. Eksp. Teor. Fiz., 34, 751-752 (1958).
- A. V. Gaponov-Grekhov and G. I. Freidman, On shock electromagnetic waves in ferrites, Zh. Eksp. Teor. Fiz., 36, 957 (1959).
- A. V. Gaponov-Grekhov, On the instability of the system of excited oscillators with respect to electromagnetic disturbances, Zh. Eksp. Teor. Fiz., 39, No. 2, 326 (1960).
- A. V. Gaponov-Grekhov and M. I. Rabinovich, Theory of dynamical turbulence. Advances in theoretical Physics (Proc. of Landau Birthday Symp., Copenhagen), Pergamon Press, (1989), pp. 64–80.
- A. V. Gaponov-Grekhov and M. I. Rabinovich, Vibration, Chaos, Structures, Springer Verlag (1990).
- A. V. Gaponov-Grekhov and V. L. Granatstein, eds., Applications of High-Power Microwaves, Artech House Inc., Boston & London (1994).
- A. V.Gaponov-Grekhov, D. I. Iudin, and V.Yu. Trakhtengerts, Attraction mechanism of like-charged aerosol particles in a moving conductive medium, JETP, 101, 177-185 (2005).

== Honors and awards ==
- Order of Lenin (1975, 1986)
- Order of the October Revolution (1981)
- State Prize of the USSR (1967, 1983)
- Hero of Socialist Labor (1986)
- Demidov Prize (1995)
- Order of Merit for the Fatherland 3rd Class (1999)
- Lomonosov Gold Medal (2000)
- State Prize of the Russian Federation for Science and Technology (2003)
- Prize of the Foundation for the Promotion of Russian Science (2004)
- Order of Merit for the Fatherland 2nd Class (2006)
- Corresponding Member of the USSR Academy of Sciences (1964)
- Full Member (Academician) of the USSR Academy of Sciences (1968)
- Full Member (Academician) of the Russian Academy of Sciences
- Honorary Professor of the Lobachevsky University, Nizhny Novgorod
- Honorary Citizen of the city of Nizhny Novgorod
