= Tokamak de Fontenay-aux-Roses =

Former experimental tokamak fusion experiment in Paris, France

TFR
Tokamak de Fontenay-aux-Roses
- Device type: Tokamak
- Location: Fontenay-aux-Roses, Paris, France
- Affiliation: Commissariat à l'énergie atomique

Technical specifications
- Major radius: 98 cm (39 in) (often listed as 1 m)
- Minor radius: 20 cm (7.9 in) (later 24 cm (9.4 in))
- Plasma volume: 1 m^{3}
- Magnetic field: 6.0 T (60,000 G) (toroidal)
- Heating power: 2.2 MW
- Discharge duration: 0.25 s
- Plasma current: 400 kA (later 600)
- Plasma temperature: 3 keV (electrons)

History
- Date(s) of construction: 1970 to 1973
- Year(s) of operation: 1973–1986
- Succeeded by: Tore Supra

The Tokamak de Fontenay-aux-Roses (TFR) was the first French tokamak, built in a research centre of the French Atomic Energy Commission (CEA) in Fontenay-aux-Roses, a commune in the southwestern suburbs of Paris. The project was spearheaded by Paul-Henri Rebut, and is sometimes jokingly referred to as the "Tokamak façon Rebut" – a pun on the name Rebut and the French word "rebut" meaning "rubbish".

TFR was roughly the same size as the contemporary Soviet T-3 and American Symmetrical Tokamak, but had a larger internal plasma volume and a much more powerful power supply that drove plasma currents up to 400,000 amps and as long as half a second. Completed in 1973, it remained the world's most powerful tokamak until 1976, when it was surpassed by the Princeton Large Torus. It underwent several major upgrades during its lifetime, which continually improved its performance.

Among the major discoveries made on TFR was the problem of runaway electrons. In 1973, only months after beginning operations, such an event burned holes through the vacuum vessel, requiring extensive repairs. The following investigation identified a new type of plasma instability that was previously not noticed, today known as neoclassical transport. Since this time a number of similar issues have been found and they are now all classified as "disruptions".

A replacement vacuum vessel was quickly supplied and the device soon reached its design goals. It was later expanded several times with more powerful power supplies and more heating systems. TFR was decommissioned in 1986, at which time it was the oldest operating tokamak. It was replaced by Tore Supra at France's main atomic research center, Cadarache.

== History ==
=== Tokamak rush ===
When the tokamak concept was first revealed by Soviet researchers in 1965, the results were so good that international observers dismissed them out of hand. A follow-up in 1968 showed even better results, 10 to 100 times the best seen in other labs. Once again the other labs dismissed the Soviet results. This time, however, Lev Artsimovich was prepared. He invited a team of UK researchers, nicknamed "the Culham Five", to measure the electron temperature in the T-3 device using their newly-developed laser Thomson scattering diagnostic equipment. After months of setup and calibration, by the summer of 1969 the measurements carried out under the supervision of Derek Robinson showed the results were even better than the Soviets had reported the previous year.

The result is what is today known as the "tokamak rush". These results suggested that the tokamak was the first large-scale device that clearly beat a significant barrier to progress up to that date, Bohm diffusion. While some experiments in the UK and US also showed signs of beating this limit, they did so at lower temperatures that were not useful for a fusion device. The tokamak's plasma was remaining stable even at the very highest temperatures the device was capable of. Interest in almost all other approaches waned, and by 1970 there were dozens of efforts around the world to beat the Soviet results.

=== TFR ===
In 1970, the decision was made to concentrate all fusion research in France at Fontenay-aux-Roses, mirroring the UK's similar decision that resulted in UKAEA Culham in 1965. Planning for the TFR began immediately under the direction of Paul-Henri Rebut, and the design is sometimes jokingly referred to as the "Tokamak façon Rebut". Based largely on the Soviet T-3 design, TFR was similar in dimensions and construction, but had much larger power supplies that would allow them to produce higher plasma densities and for longer times, and a larger internal plasma volume of 1 cubic meter. For comparison, the modern ITER tokamak is 840 cubic meters.

TFR produced its first plasma on 22 March 1973. The system quickly ramped up its power until three months later when a hole burned through the inner wall of the vacuum chamber. The reason for this was quickly determined to be due to a beam of fast electrons, roughly 50 keV. The beam formed by trapping electrons in a magnetic mirror formed within the torus, which built up to a critical threshold. At this point, the interaction between the electrons and the surrounding plasma causes an effect that had first been proposed as a mechanism for the propagation of lightning.

This previously unseen mirroring effect is today known as neoclassical transport, which is formed by the magnetic field being stronger on the inside radius of the toroid than the outside, causing low-energy particles to be reflected as they travel along paths that take them closer to the inside edge. As more of these particles build up in these "banana orbits", so named for their curved shape, they can reach a point where they have enough density to create a channel of charge that accelerates them in the surrounding plasma and the resulting electron bursts are known as runaway electrons. Today, these events are part of a larger group of similar problems known generically as "disruptions".

The vacuum chamber was replaced and experiments began to increase the performance once again, reaching the original performance goals in October 1974. By that time, TFR was the most powerful tokamak in the world, reaching ion temperatures of 1 keV and a Lawson criterion figure of 2.5 × 10^{12}/cm³s.

Even with the larger power supplies, the system was not able to heat the plasma to fusion temperatures. This was one of the major problems with the basic tokamak design compared to earlier systems like Z-pinch that also strongly heated their plasmas. To address this, TFR had planned almost from the start to incorporate neutral beam injection, or NBI, which uses a small particle accelerator to fire individual atoms of fuel into the reaction chamber. NBI both supplies fresh fuel as well as energy that heats the plasma. By the end of 1975, the 500 kW injectors had raised the operating temperatures to 2 keV, although at a relatively low electron density of 4.4 × 10^{13}/cm³.

=== Continuing improvements ===
In 1977, the vacuum chamber was replaced with a new design that removed the inner shell of copper that had been included to stabilize the plasma. Soviet researchers had developed a new system using additional magnets and feedback control that prevented vertical movement of the plasma, which the shell had previously performed. As well as simplifying the design, the new layout allowed the chamber to have more access points.

The limiter was changed to one made of Inconel. The system initially used a limiter made of molybdenum, whose high melting point allowed it to better absorb the heat load of the ions hitting it. This also resulted in molybdenum being sputtered off into the plasma, which caused the average atomic mass, or Z, of the plasma to be over 3. Energy is lost from a stable plasma primarily through light production (in this context known as radiation), which is a product of temperature and atomic mass. Due to the Z>3, the electron density could not be increased beyond 6 × 10^{13}/cm³. The new liner, along with a new systematic cleaning regimen, reduced Z back towards 1 and allowed densities to increase to 1.2 × 10^{14}/cm³.

After 1978, attention turned to providing more heating through the use of ion cyclotron resonance frequency heating, or ICRF. ICRF uses radio frequency energy tuned to the cyclotron frequency of the ions to add energy to them, similar to the way a microwave oven heats water.

Between August 1976 and September 1977 the TFR was dismantled and replaced by a new design sometimes known as TFR-600. The main difference with the previous version was a maximum plasma radius of 24 centimetres (9.4 in), in combination with an improved power supply capable of generating a plasma current of 600 kA. By August 1981, the addition of five more NBI lines increased the ICRF heating power to 2.2 MW and produced plasmas at 2 keV at a high central electron density of 2 × 10^{14}/cm³.

The Inconel limiter improved the average Z but still resulted in nickel ions in the plasma. In 1982 it was replaced by one made of carbon that greatly reduced atomic mass, and from this point, the primary losses were not due to radiation but electron losses. Around 1985, a new heating system, electron cyclotron resonance frequency, was installed in cooperation with the Institute for Plasma Physics Rijnhuizen (FOM). With the ending of these experiments, TRF shut down after twelve years of operation, at which time it was the oldest tokamak in operation.

== Description ==
The TFR was typical of early tokamak designs, using a cylindrical cross section for its plasma. The vacuum chamber of the first version (TFR 400) in use from April 1973 to August 1976, was moderately sized to confine plasma within a 20 cm (7.9 in) radius in a tube bent into a ring 98 centimetres (39 in) in radius. The TFR 600 was similar to TFR 400, except that the thick copper shell had been removed allowing a plasma radius of 24 cm (9.4 in) and a plasma current of 600 kA.

However, due to its internal arrangement, the TFR-600 had a larger 1 cubic meter useful plasma volume than other early tokamaks like the Soviet T-3. The other major difference was the much larger power supply, which could provide up to 400,000 amps for up to a quarter of a second, or lower amperage for up to half a second.

The main support for the plasma was a series of eight large toroidal magnets spread out evenly around the torus capable of generating a toroidal magnetic field up to 6 teslas. Within them were two smaller poloidal magnets, above and below the plasma chamber. Current was induced into the plasma using a transformer core placed between two of the toroidal magnets, its location can be seen by the large power cables running to it on the top of the assembly. There is significant open room between the toroidal magnets where the plasma chamber is accessible. These portions have a number of ports for fuel injection, heating systems and various diagnostic systems.

The original version cost a total of 15 million francs, almost half of which was financed by Euratom's European Nuclear research and training program.
