= Ksenia Aleksandrovna Razumova =

Russian physicist (born 1931)

Ksenia Razumova
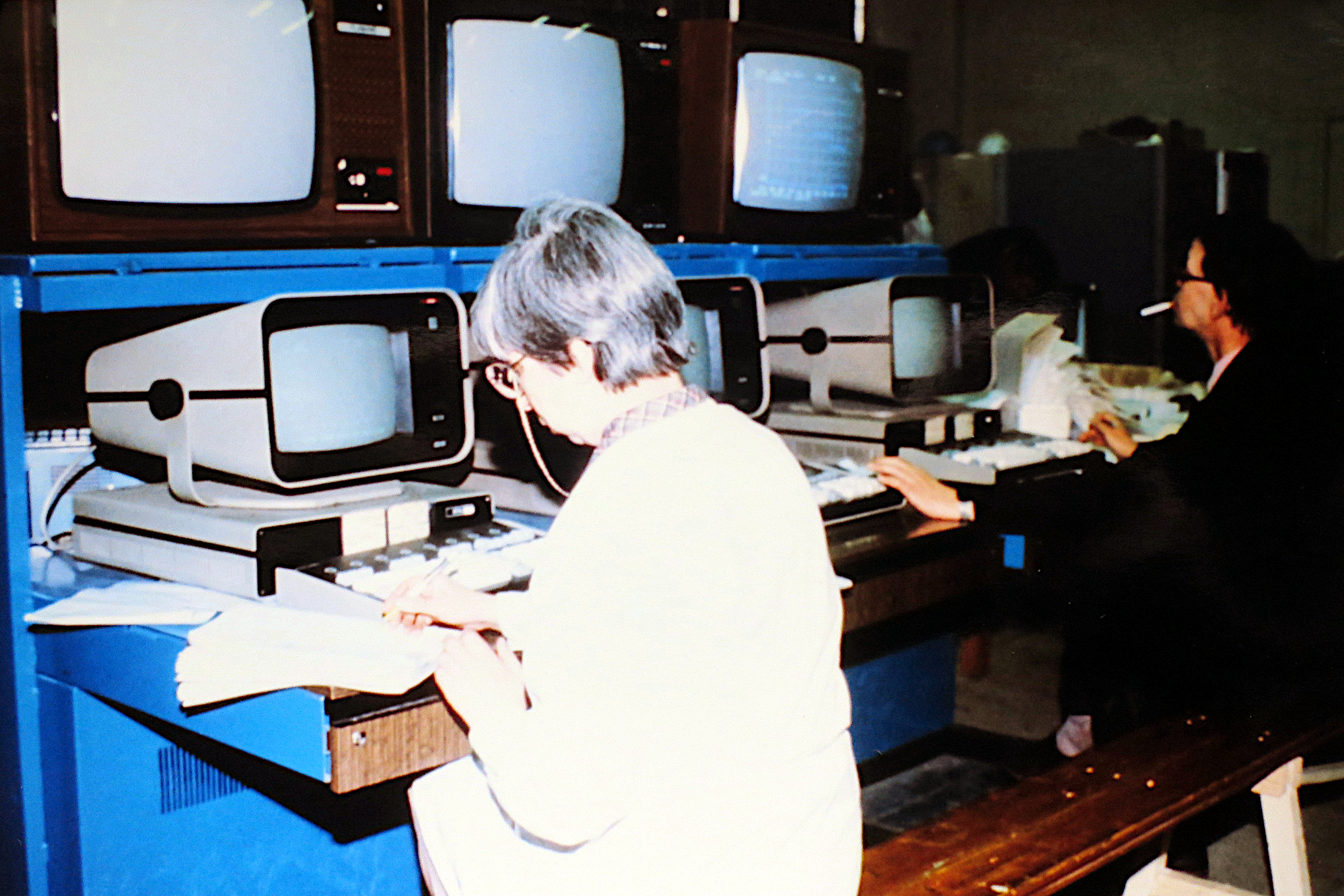
- Ksenia Razumova and Yevgeny Esipchuk in the T-10 tokamak control room during the spring 1988 campaign
- Born: 23 January 1931 (age 95)
- Education: Moscow University
- Known for: Plasma, Tokamak, Nuclear Fusion, Magnetic confinement fusion
- Scientific career
- Fields: Physicist
- Workplaces: Kurchatov Institute

Ksenia Aleksandrovna Razumova (Russian: Ксения Александровна Разумова; also transliterated Xenia Razumova; born 23 January 1931) is a Russian physicist. She graduated from the Physical Faculty of Moscow University in 1955 and took a position at the then called Kurchatov Institute of Atomic Energy in Moscow, then USSR. She defended her Ph.D. in 1966, was Candidate in Physical and Mathematical sciences in 1967, and became Doctor of Sciences in 1984. She is laboratory head at the Institute of Nuclear Fusion, Russian Research Centre Kurchatov Institute. Since the beginning she is actively involved plasma physics in research on the tokamak line of Magnetic confinement fusion.

== Selected work ==
Razumova is best known for her early experimental research in the tokamak line.

From left to right: S.V.Mirnov, E.P.Gorbunov, A.M.Us, V.S.Strelkov, L.A.Artsimovitch, K.A.Razumova, A.K.Spiridonov, V.S.Mukhovatov, V.D.Shafranov and D.P.Ivanov – awarded the State Prize of the USSR in 1971, in front of the T-4 tokamak, as shown in J. Plasma Phys. (2016), vol. 82, 515820102, with the permission of Cambridge University Press.

Inspired by the theoretical work of Vitaly Shafranov, she developed a macroscopically stable plasma in the tokamak TM-2 in 1963., opening the way to a world-wide shift of the nuclear fusion programme towards the tokamak line.

Experiments carried out by her at this tokamak, along with results obtained on the T-3 and T-4 tokamaks, convinced the scientific community that the pessimistic forecasts for the future of magnetic confinement based on the Bohm formula were unfounded. In 1971, she was awarded the USSR State Prize for creating and investigating high temperature thermonuclear plasmas in tokamaks. Her work contributed to the very fast development of the tokamak line in the 1970s.

Razumova was a pioneer on the study of MHD instabilities and disruptions in tokamaks. In 1962, she and her colleagues were the first to observe the disruption instability in a tokamak.

Razumova was the first to implement a method to measure the plasma energy based on the diamagnetic effect, still in use these days.

With V. Alikaev, she demonstrated plasma heating by Electron Cyclotron in the TM-3 tokamak. Her team also investigated runaway electrons in tokamaks.

Since the mid 1980s her interest has shifted to investigation on plasma transport, in particular to the study of profile consistency and plasma self-organization.

== Honours and awards ==
- 1971 - USSR State Prize for the "Realisation and investigation of high-temperature thermonuclear plasmas in Tokamaks"
- 1974 - I.V.Kurchatov Prize
- 1983 - USSR State Prize for her contributions to "The development of high power gyrotrons and their applications in thermonuclear research"
- 1984 - I.V.Kurchatov Prize
- 1992 - L.A.Artsimovich Prize for her contributions to "The physics of heating and current drive by electron cyclotron waves"
- 2006 - Honorable Silver Badge of the Global Energy Prize
- 2017 - The Hannes Alfvén Prize of the European Physical Society in 2017
