= Xavier Garbet =

- Education: Paris-Sorbonne University (B.S.); Paris-Saclay University (M.S.); Aix-Marseille University (Ph.D.)
- Awards: CNRS Silver Medal (2010); Fernand Holweck Medal and Prize (2019); Hannes Alfvén Prize (2022)
- Scientific career
- Fields: Plasma physics
- Institutions: CEA; Nanyang Technological University
- Thesis: Turbulence et transport anormal dans les plasmas de Tokamak (1988)
- Website: dr.ntu.edu.sg/cris/rp/rp02080

Xavier Garbet (b. 1961) is a theoretical plasma physicist and a professor at Nanyang Technological University (NTU). He is currently appointed as the Temasek Chair in Clean Energy, as his professorship was established by a $6 million endowment from Singapore's state investment firm, Temasek Holdings. This appointment aims to support a magnetic confinement fusion research and manpower training program at NTU for clean energy development in Singapore.

== Early life and career ==
In 1982, Garbet received a Bachelor's degree in Physics from Paris-Sorbonne University. He then earned a Master's degree in plasma physics from Paris-Saclay University. Subsequently, he earned a PhD degree in theoretical and high-energy physics in 1988 and a Habilitation à diriger des recherches (French habilitation) in 2001 from Aix-Marseille University.

Garbet was hired by the French Alternative Energies and Atomic Energy Commission (CEA) in 1988. He was a visiting scientist at General Atomics from 1994 to 1995 and led a plasma transport modelling task force at the Joint European Torus from 2001 to 2004. In 2008, he became a research director at CEA. In 2022, he joined NTU as a professor of theoretical and computational plasma physics and was appointed as the Temasek Chair in Clean Energy.

== Honours and awards ==
Garbet was awarded the CNRS Silver Medal by the French National Centre for Scientific Research for his work on plasma confinement fusion in 2010.

In 2019, he was awarded the Fernand Holweck Medal and Prize by the Société Française de Physique.

In 2022, Garbet was awarded the Hannes Alfvén Prize for his theoretical contributions to the dynamics of magnetically confined fusion plasmas.
