= Vitaly Shafranov =

Soviet plasma physicist (1929–2014)

- Виталий Шафранов
- Born: Vitaly Dmitrievich Shafranov; December 1, 1929; Mordvinovo, Russian SFSR
- Died: June 9, 2014 (aged 84); Moscow, Russia
- Known for: Grad–Shafranov equation; Kruskal–Shafranov instability
- Awards: USSR State Prize (1971); Lenin Prize (1984); Hannes Alfvén Prize (2001)
- Scientific career
- Fields: Plasma physics
- Workplaces: Kurchatov Institute

Vitaly Dmitrievich Shafranov (Russian: Виталий Дмитриевич Шафранов; December 1, 1929 – June 9, 2014) was a Russian theoretical physicist and Academician who worked with plasma physics and thermonuclear fusion research.

== Life and Research ==
Vitaly Dmitrievich Shafranov was born in the village of Mordvinovo in Ryazan region in 1929. During World War II, Schafranov attended the school and worked together with his father building roads. In 1943 he got his first national award at the age 14. From 1946, Schafranov studied at the Physics Department of the Moscow State University.

After graduating in 1951, he started to work with nuclear fusion in the Theory Department headed by Mikhail Aleksandrovich Leontovich at LIPAN (Laboratory of Measuring Instruments of the USSR Academy of Sciences) as today's Russian Research Centre "Kurchatov Institute" was known at the time. He examined tokamaks stability and gave some parameter estimation for Soviet tokamak experiments.

Shafranov was central to the early Soviet tokamak program. He first worked on trying to deduce the design and operating principles of the ZETA machine at Harwell in the UK. ZETA was then the world's largest and most performant fusion experiment, and the press incorrectly reported that it had accomplished fusion in September 1957, while the work was still partly confidential. He decided, incorrectly, that ZETA must be a tokamak, and this spurred seminal theoretical work on the tokamak type. He was involved in the early tokamak experiments as a theorist, and his theoretical calculations were used to analyse the results from the T-3 tokamak, which in 1968 published much superior performance to the UK ZETA or the US Model C stellarator and sparked worldwide interest in the tokamak type.

Concepts central to magnetic confinement fusion such as the Shafranov shift (1959), the Kruskal-Shafranov stability criterion and limit value and the Grad-Shafranov equation (1957) are named after him. These were central to the early development of the tokamak in the Soviet Union, as well as for later tokamaks, and are still widely used in fusion physics in the 2020s. In 1972, he suggested with Lev Artsimovich a tokamak with D-shaped cross-section.

He also dealt with shock waves in plasmas and interaction of electromagnetic waves with plasmas. Later, he worked intensively on stellarators. In 1981 he succeeded Leontovich as head of the Theory Department of Nuclear Fusion at the Kurchatov Institute.

== Honors and Awards ==
In 1971 he was awarded the State Prize of the USSR. In 1981 he became a corresponding member of the Soviet Academy of Sciences. In 1984 he won the Lenin Prize, and in 1997 he was made a full member of the Academy. In 2001 he received the European Physical Society Hannes Alfvén Prize.

Since 1983 he was editor of Plasma Physics Reports (Fizika Plasmy). From the death of Boris Kadomtsev until his own death, he also served as editor of the Reviews of Plasma Physics collection.

== Selected work ==
- On magnetohydrodynamical equilibrium configurations, Soviet Physics JETP, vol. 6, 1983, p. 1013.
- Plasma Equilibrium in a Magnetic Field, in Leontovich, M. A. (Ed.): Reviews of Plasma Physics, vol. 2, 1963.
- Electromagnetic waves in a plasma, in Leontovich: Reviews of Plasma Physics, vol. 3, 1963.
- V. S. Mukhovatov: Plasma equilibrium in a Tokamak, Nuclear Fusion, vol. 11, 1971, p. 605.
- Determination of the parameters $\beta_p$ and $l_i$ in a tokamak for arbitrary shape of plasma pinch cross-section, Plasma Physics, vol. 13, 1971, 757.
- L E Zakharov, V D Shafranov. Equilibrium of a toroidal plasma with noncircular cross-section, Sov. Phys. Tech. Phys. vol. 18, 1973, 151–156.
- L. E. Zakharov, V. D. Shafranov. Evolution of equilibrium of toroidal plasma, in B. Kadomtsev, Plasma Physics, Advances in Science and Technology in the USSR Physics Series, MIR Moscow 1981.
- L. E. Zakharov, V. D. Shafranov. Equilibrium of current carrying plasmas in toroidal configurations, in M. A. Leontovich Reviews of Plasma Physics, vol. 11, Consultants Bureau, New York 1986.
- V. D. Shafranov. Magnetohydrodynamic theory of plasma equilibrium and stability in stellarators: a survey of results, Physics of Fluids, vol. 26, 1983, S. 357.
- V. D. Pustovitov in B. Kadomtsev: Reviews of Plasma Physics, vol. 15, 1989, 163.
