= James Benjamin Rosenzweig =

American experimental plasma physicist

James Rosenzweig
- Born: James Benjamin Rosenzweig
- Education: University of Wisconsin–Madison (Ph.D.)
- Known for: Blowout regime in plasma wakefield acceleration
- Awards: FEL Prize (2007); Advanced Accelerator Prize (2022); Hannes Alfvén Prize (2023)
- Scientific career
- Fields: Plasma physics
- Institutions: UCLA
- Thesis: Plasma Wake Fields in High-Energy Physics: An Experimental and Theoretical Investigation (1988)

James Benjamin Rosenzweig is an experimental plasma physicist and a distinguished professor at the University of California, Los Angeles (UCLA). In the field of plasma wakefield acceleration, he is regarded as the father of the non-linear "blowout" interaction regime, where a laser beam, when fired into a plasma at intense levels, expels electrons from the plasma and creates a spherical structure that can effectively focus and accelerate the plasma.

Rosenzweig's research on accelerator technologies and light source development is also considered to be pioneering in the field. For his research on plasma acceleration and electron beams, Rosenzweig was inducted as a fellow of the American Physical Society in 1998. He is the recipient of the 2007 Free Electron Laser (FEL) Prize, 2022 Advanced Accelerator Prize, and the 2023 Hannes Alfvén Prize.

== Early life and career ==
Rosenzweig received his Ph.D. from the University of Wisconsin–Madison in 1988.

From 2009 to 2014, Rosenzweig served as the chair of the UCLA Department of Physics and Astronomy. He is the director of the UCLA's Particle Beam Physics Laboratory, which primarily focuses on exploring the fundamental aspects of high brightness, ultra-fast relativistic electron beams.

Rosenzweig co-founded several industrial accelerator companies, including RadiaBeam Technologies in 2003.

== Scientific contributions ==
Rosenzweig's research specializes in advanced accelerator, beam, and radiation techniques, along with their applications across various scientific disciplines. His research has applications in very high field accelerators based on lasers, wakefields, plasmas and dielectrics, as well as the production of radiation in free-electron lasers and Compton scattering sources, with applications ranging from high field pumps for studying non-equilibrium high field phenomena to atomic-molecular level ultra-fast imaging techniques.

Rosenzweig has written a textbook, Fundamentals of Beam Physics, which emphasizes unity of concepts between charged particles and laser beams.

== Honors and awards ==
Rosenzweig was awarded the Sloan Research Fellowship in 1993. He is a recipient of the SCC and Wilson Fellowships.

In 1998, Rosenzweig was inducted as a fellow of the American Physical Society for his "experimental and theoretical work on plasma wakefield acceleration and focusing techniques, and developments in the theory and diagnosis of high brightness, short pulse electron beams".

In 2007, Rosenzweig was jointly awarded the Free Electron Laser (FEL) Prize with Ilan Ben-Zvi. He was awarded the 2022 Advanced Accelerator Prize

In 2023, Rosenzweig, along with Pisin Chen and Chandrashekhar J. Joshi, jointly received the Hannes Alfvén Prize from the European Physical Society. They were honored for inventing and pioneering the technique of beam-driven plasma wakefield acceleration (PWFA).

== Publications ==
=== Books ===
- Rosenzweig, J. B. (2003). Fundamentals of Beam Physics. Oxford University Press. ISBN 978-0-19-171172-5.
