= Jack Connor (physicist) =

British theoretical physicist

- Citizenship: British
- Occupation: Theoretical physicist

John 'Jack' Connor is a British theoretical physicist whose research focussed on understanding the physics of nuclear fusion.

== Education ==
After studying for an undergraduate degree in Mathematical Physics at the University of Birmingham he gained a PhD in Elementary Particle Physics at the same university.

== Career ==
In 1967 he began working at the Culham Centre for Fusion Energy in Oxfordshire where he remained until he retired in 2007. In 2004 he was awarded the Hannes Alfvén Prize alongside Jim Hastie and Bryan Taylor due to their wide contributions to the development of theories critical to magnetic confinement fusion.

== Recognition ==
In 2010 he was elected a Fellow of the Royal Society for his contributions to the field, in particular for his work in the 1970s demonstrating that a plasma confined in a tokamak can produce its own current, termed the bootstrap current. This discovery is the basis of all modern tokamak reactors, including ITER.
