= Dreicer field =

The Dreicer field (or Dreicer electric field) is the critical electric field above which electrons in a collisional plasma can be accelerated to become runaway electrons. It was named after Harry Dreicer who derived the expression in 1959 and expanded on the concept (i.e. runaway generation) in 1960. The Dreicer field is an important parameter in the study of tokamaks to suppress runaway generation in nuclear fusion.

The Dreicer field is given by
$$E_D = \frac{1}{4\pi\epsilon_0^2} \frac{ne^3 \ln\Lambda}{m_ev_{Te}^2}$$
where $n$ is the electron density, $e$ is the elementary charge, $\ln\Lambda$ is the Coulomb logarithm, $\epsilon_0$ is the vacuum permittivity, $m_e$ is the electron mass and $v_{Te}$ is the electron thermal speed. It was derived by considering the balance between the electric field and the collisional forces acting on a single electron within the plasma.

Recent experiments have shown that the electric field required to accelerate electrons is significantly larger than the theoretically calculated Dreicer field. New models have been proposed to explain the discrepancy.
