= Malcolm Haines =

British physicist

- Born: Malcolm Golby Haines; 12 October 1936; Belfast, Northern Ireland
- Died: 13 January 2013 (aged 76); Cambridge, United Kingdom
- Education: Imperial College London (B.S., Ph.D.)
- Known for: Z-pinches
- Awards: Hannes Alfvén Prize (2005)
- Scientific career
- Fields: Plasma physics
- Workplaces: Imperial College London
- Thesis: (1959)

Malcolm Golby Haines (12 October 1936 – 13 January 2013) was a British plasma physicist known for his research on Z-pinches. He was a Fellow of the American Physical Society and was co-awarded the 2005 Hannes Alfvén Prize.

== Early life and career ==
Haines studied at Imperial College London in 1953 and has remained there for the rest of his life. He obtained a Bachelor of Science (B.S.) and Doctor of Philosophy (Ph.D.) in 1957 and 1960 respectively. He then joined the Imperial College faculty as a lecturer in 1960, was promoted to senior lecturer in 1967 and later appointed Professor of Physics. He retired in 2002, but was still active in research in the Plasma Physics Group as emeritus professor.

== Scientific contributions ==
After Russian scientists led by Valentin Smirnov had achieved a breakthrough in plasma physics by using rod grids in Z-pinch arrangements, Haines optimized the grids and other experimental parameters and undertook theoretical simulations of the implosion processes. They were tested on MAGPIE (Mega Ampere Generator for Plasma Implosion Experiments) at Imperial College. The method revolutionized the research of inertial fusion with Z-pinch arrangements (and their use as the strongest known X-ray sources) up to the construction of the Z-machine at Sandia National Laboratories under Tom Sanford. In 2006, he and his colleagues proposed a model to explain the record temperatures of 2 to 3 billion kelvins generated in the Z machine—the eddies formed by the numerous instabilities of the intense magnetic field are slowed down in the dense plasma and give their energy to the ions.

== Honors and awards ==
In 1995, Haines was inducted as a Fellow of the American Physical Society. In 2005, he received the Hannes Alfvén Prize with Tom Sanford and Valentin Smirnov.
