= IEEE Marie Sklodowska-Curie Award =

- Awarded for: Outstanding contributions to the field of nuclear and plasma sciences and engineering
- Presented by: Institute of Electrical and Electronics Engineers
- First award: 2011
- Website: IEEE Marie Sklodowska-Curie Award

The IEEE Marie Sklodowska-Curie Award is a Technical Field Award that was established by the IEEE Board of Directors in 2008. This award may be presented for outstanding contributions to the field of nuclear and plasma sciences and engineering. This award may be presented to an individual, individuals on a team, or up to three multiple recipients. Recipients of this award receive a bronze medal, certificate, and honorarium. This award was presented for the first time in 2011.

The recipients include the following:

- 2027: Victor Malka, for "leadership in the development of laser driven particle sources towards practical applicability."
- 2026: Irène Buvat, for "innovation in medical image quantification and computational tools leading to widespread application in biomedical research and clinical use."
- 2025: Charles L. Melcher, for "the discovery and development of the cerium-doped lutetium-oxy-orthosilicate scintillator and its long-standing impact on positron emission tomography."
- 2024: Richard E. Carson, for "contributions to image reconstruction and tracer kinetic analysis in positron emission tomography.”
- 2023: Janet L. Barth, for "leadership of and contributions to the advancement of the design, building, deployment, and operation of capable, robust space systems."
- 2021: Michel Defrise
- 2020: Michael A. Lieberman
- 2019: Sanjiv "Sam" Gambhir
- 2018: David R. Nygren, an American particle physicist, for "pioneering radiation detector developments, enabling major discoveries in diverse areas of science."
- 2017: Chandrashekhar J. Joshi, an American experimental plasma physicist, for "groundbreaking contributions to and leadership in the field of plasma particle accelerators."
- 2016: Simon R. Cherry, an American positron emission tomography expert and biomedical engineer, for "contributions to the development and application of in vivo molecular imaging systems."
- 2015: Noah Hershkowitz, an American plasma physicist, for "innovative research and inspiring education in basic and applied plasma science."
- 2014: Three winners, for "developing maximum-likelihood image reconstruction in emission tomography leading to its widespread and effective use in healthcare."
  - H. Malcolm Hudson, an Australian mathematician and statistics professor at Macquarie University in New South Wales.
  - Brian F. Hutton, Professor of Medical Physics in Nuclear Medicine and Molecular Imaging Science at the Institute of Nuclear Medicine at the University College London.
  - Lawrence A. Shepp, posthumously, an American mathematician.
- 2013: Veljko Radeka, a Croatian–American engineer and Brookhaven National Laboratory research scientist, for "the development of new radiation detectors, electronics, and systems that operate at the fundamental limits of performance, enabling discoveries in many areas of science."
- 2012: Gennady Andreevich Mesyats, a Soviet-born physicist, for "founding the field of nanosecond pulsed power and for seminal contributions to the physics of vacuum breakdown at high power levels."
- 2011: Ned Birdsall, an American experimental plasma physicist, for "theoretical investigations and fundamental discoveries involving microwave tubes, electron beam physics and particle-in-cell simulation of plasma physics."
