= Bhuvana Srinivasan =

American aerospace engineer and plasma physicist

Bhuvana Srinivasan is an American aerospace engineer and plasma physicist whose research involves the numerical simulation of plasma to better understand its instabilities, confinement, and interactions with matter, and for applications including plasma propulsion engines, nuclear fusion, and space plasma physics. She is a professor in the William E. Boeing Department of Aeronautics and Astronautics at the University of Washington.

== Education and career ==
Srinivasan received bachelor's degrees in both aerospace engineering and mechanical engineering from the Illinois Institute of Technology, in 2004. She continued her studies in the Department of Aeronautics and Astronautics at the University of Washington, receiving a master's degree in 2006 and completing her Ph.D. in 2010.

She became a postdoctoral researcher at the Los Alamos National Laboratory from 2010 to 2013, and a permanent staff researcher there from 2013 to 2016. In 2014, she took a position as an assistant professor of aerospace and ocean engineering at Virginia Tech, where she was promoted to associate professor and held an Endowed Crofton Faculty Fellowship before returning to the University of Washington as a faculty member in 2023.

== Recognition ==
Srinivasan was a 2025 recipient of the Presidential Early Career Award for Scientists and Engineers.
