= Francis F. Chen =

American plasma physicist

- Born: November 18, 1929 (age 96); Guangdong, Republic of China
- Education: Harvard University (B.S., Masters, Ph.D.)
- Spouse: Ande
- Awards: James Clerk Maxwell Prize for Plasma Physics (1995)
- Scientific career
- Fields: Plasma physics
- Institutions: Princeton Plasma Physics Laboratory; UCLA
- Doctoral advisor: Norman Ramsey
- Doctoral students: Warren B. Mori

Francis F. Chen (born November 18, 1929) is a Chinese-born American plasma physicist and electrical engineer.

== Early life and education ==
On November 18, 1929, Chen was born in Guangdong province, China. Chen studied at Harvard University, where he received his bachelor's degree in astronomy in 1950, a master's degree in physics in 1953, and his doctorate in 1954. At that time he worked on high-energy physics (proton-proton scattering and proton-nucleus scattering at the new energy of 1 GeV).

== Career ==
In 1954, Chen worked at the Princeton Plasma Physics Laboratory (PPPL), where he worked initially with the Model B1 Stellarator, a device used to confine hot plasma with magnetic fields in order to sustain a controlled nuclear fusion reaction. With the B1 Stellarator, Chen was the first to show that electrons could be trapped by a magnetic field for millions of traverses. Chen remained at PPPL until 1969.

In 1969, Chen became a professor of electrical engineering at the University of California, Los Angeles. In 1994, Chen became a professor emeritus. Chen was a visiting scientist at the nuclear research center in Fontenay-aux-Roses in 1962-63, 1977 in Lausanne and in 1985 in Australia and Japan.

Chen has been concerned with not only basic research in plasma physics and magnetic and inertial confinement fusion, but also with low-energy plasma physics for industrial applications such as semiconductors. He has worked in both theoretical and experimental plasma physics. He has studied multiple subfields of plasma physics including: plasma diagnostics, accelerator concepts with plasmas, helicon plasma sources, plasma instabilities of laser interaction, Langmuir probes, resistive drift waves, anomalous diffusion, and Q-machines. He wrote a very well known and highly regarded Introductory plasma physics textbook (see below).

During Chen's career, he has published over 240 technical papers.

== Honors and awards ==
Since 1968, he has been a Fellow of the American Physical Society (APS). In 1983, he was chairman of the Plasma Physics Section of the APS. Since 1980, he has been a Fellow of the Institute of Electrical and Electronics Engineers, and he received the Plasma Physics and Applications Award in 1994. He received the James Clerk Maxwell Prize for Plasma Physics in 1995.

== Personal life ==
Chen's wife is Ande. Chen and his wife are bird photographers.

== Selected works ==
=== Books ===
- Introduction to Plasma Physics and Controlled Fusion. 3rd ed. Heidelberg: Springer, 2016. 2nd edition, 2013 ISBN 978-1-4419-3201-3
- with Jane P. Chang Lecture Notes on Principles of Plasma Processing. New York: Springer, 2009. 1st edition, 2003 ISBN 0-306-47497-2
- An Indispensable Truth: How Fusion Power Can Save the Planet. New York: Springer, 2011. ISBN 978-1-4419-7819-6

=== Articles ===
- Chen, Francis F. (March 15, 1962). "Radial Electric Field in a Reflex Discharge". Physical Review Letters, vol. 8, no. 6.
- Chen, Francis F. (July 1967) "The Leakage Problem in Fusion Reactors". Scientific American. vol. 217, no 1. JSTOR 24926059
- Chen, Francis F. (May 1979) "Alternate concepts in magnetic fusion". Physics Today, pp. 36–42.

== See also ==
- Stellarator
