= Hartmut Zohm =

German physicist

- Born: November 2, 1962 (age 63); Freiburg im Breisgau, Germany
- Education: Heidelberg University, Max Planck Institute (Ph.D.)
- Awards: Otto Hahn Medal (1991); John Dawson Award (2014); Hannes Alfvén Prize (2016)
- Scientific career
- Fields: Plasma physics
- Thesis: (1990)
- Website: www.ipp.mpg.de/ippcms/de/for/bereiche/e1

Hartmut Zohm (born 2 November 1962) is a German plasma physicist who is known for his work on the ASDEX Upgrade machine. He received the 2014 John Dawson Award and the 2016 Hannes Alfvén Prize for successfully demonstrating that neoclassical tearing modes in tokamaks can be stabilized by electron cyclotron resonance heating, which is an important design consideration for pushing the performance limit of the ITER.

Zohm is currently at the Max Planck Institute for Plasma Physics, and an Honorary Professor at LMU Munich.

== Early life and career ==
Zohm received his doctorate in 1990 from Heidelberg University and the Max Planck Institute for Plasma Physics in Garching, Germany. His doctoral thesis "Investigation of Magnetic Modes in the ASDEX Tokamak" received the Otto Hahn Medal in 1991. He was a post-graduate student at General Atomics in San Diego, California. In 1996, he habilitated in experimental physics at the University of Augsburg and was professor for electrical engineering and plasma research at the University of Stuttgart from 1996 to 1999. He has been a scientific member of the Max Planck Institute for Plasma Physics since 1999 and heads the Tokamak scenario research area. In 2003, he became an honorary professor at LMU Munich.

With his department at the ASDEX Upgrade (and JET), he researches plasma states (tokamak scenarios), energy dissipation, particle control including the removal of helium ash and the control of edge instabilities (edge localized modes) for optimal operation of ITER and DEMO.

== Honors and awards ==
Zohm is an elected fellow of the American Physical Society.

In 1991 his doctoral thesis Investigation of Magnetic Modes in the ASDEX Tokamak received the Otto-Hahn-Medal.

In 2014, he received the American Physical Society's John Dawson Award for Excellence in Plasma Physics Research for "the theoretical prediction and experimental demonstration of neoclassical tearing mode stabilization by localized electron cyclotron current drive".

In 2016, he and Sergei Bulanov received the Hannes Alfvén Prize from the European Physical Society for "their experimental and theoretical contributions to the development of large-scale next-step devices in high-temperature plasma physics research".

== Books ==
- Zohm, Hartmut (24 November 2014). Magnetohydrodynamic stability of tokamaks. Weinheim, Germany. ISBN 978-3-527-67736-8. OCLC 899008684.
