= Grad–Shafranov equation =

Equilibrium equation

The Grad–Shafranov equation (Vitalii Dmitrievich Shafranov (1957); H. Grad and H. Rubin (1958)) is the equilibrium equation in ideal magnetohydrodynamics (MHD) for a two dimensional plasma, for example the axisymmetric toroidal plasma in a tokamak. This equation takes the same form as the Hicks equation from fluid dynamics. This equation is a two-dimensional, nonlinear, elliptic partial differential equation obtained from the reduction of the ideal MHD equations to two dimensions, often for the case of toroidal axisymmetry (the case relevant in a tokamak). Taking $(r,\theta,z)$ as the cylindrical coordinates, the flux function $\psi$ is governed by the equation,

$\frac{\partial^2 \psi}{\partial r^2} - \frac{1}{r} \frac{\partial \psi}{\partial r} + \frac{\partial^2 \psi}{\partial z^2} = - \mu_0 r^{2}\frac{dp}{d\psi} - \frac{1}{2} \frac{dF^2}{d\psi},$

where $\mu_0$ is the magnetic permeability, $p(\psi)$ is the pressure, $F(\psi)=rB_{\theta}$, and the magnetic field and current are, respectively, given by
$$\begin{align}
\mathbf{B} &= \frac{1}{r} \nabla\psi \times \hat\mathbf{e}_\theta + \frac{F}{r} \hat\mathbf{e}_\theta, \\
\mu_0\mathbf{J} &= \frac{1}{r} \frac{dF}{d\psi} \nabla\psi \times \hat\mathbf{e}_\theta - \left[\frac{\partial}{\partial r} \left(\frac{1}{r} \frac{\partial \psi}{\partial r}\right) + \frac{1}{r} \frac{\partial^2 \psi}{\partial z^2}\right] \hat\mathbf{e}_\theta.
\end{align}$$

The nature of the equilibrium, whether it be a tokamak, reversed field pinch, etc. is largely determined by the choices of the two functions $F(\psi)$ and $p(\psi)$ as well as the boundary conditions.

== Derivation (in Cartesian coordinates) ==
In the following, it is assumed that the system is 2-dimensional with $z$ as the invariant axis, i.e. $\frac{\partial}{\partial z}$ produces 0 for any quantity. Then the magnetic field can be written in cartesian coordinates as
$$\mathbf{B} = \left(\frac{\partial A}{\partial y}, -\frac{\partial A}{\partial x}, B_z(x, y)\right),$$
or more compactly,
$$\mathbf{B} =\nabla A \times \hat{\mathbf{z}} + B_z \hat{\mathbf{z}},$$
where $A(x,y)\hat{\mathbf{z}}$ is the vector potential for the in-plane (x and y components) magnetic field. Note that based on this form for B we can see that A is constant along any given magnetic field line, since $\nabla A$ is everywhere perpendicular to B. (Also note that -A is the flux function $\psi$ mentioned above.)

Two dimensional, stationary, magnetic structures are described by the balance of pressure forces and magnetic forces, i.e.:
$$\nabla p = \mathbf{j} \times \mathbf{B},$$
where p is the plasma pressure and j is the electric current. It is known that p is a constant along any field line, (again since $\nabla p$ is everywhere perpendicular to B). Additionally, the two-dimensional assumption ($\frac{\partial}{\partial z} = 0$) means that the z- component of the left hand side must be zero, so the z-component of the magnetic force on the right hand side must also be zero. This means that $\mathbf{j}_\perp \times \mathbf{B}_\perp = 0$, i.e. $\mathbf{j}_\perp$ is parallel to $\mathbf{B}_\perp$.

The right hand side of the previous equation can be considered in two parts:
$$\mathbf{j} \times \mathbf{B} = j_z (\hat{\mathbf{z}} \times \mathbf{B_\perp}) + \mathbf{j_\perp} \times \hat{\mathbf{z}}B_z ,$$
where the $\perp$ subscript denotes the component in the plane perpendicular to the $z$-axis. The $z$ component of the current in the above equation can be written in terms of the one-dimensional vector potential as
$$j_z = -\frac{1}{\mu_0} \nabla^2 A.$$

The in plane field is
$$\mathbf{B}_\perp = \nabla A \times \hat{\mathbf{z}},$$
and using Maxwell–Ampère's equation, the in plane current is given by
$$\mathbf{j}_\perp = \frac{1}{\mu_0} \nabla B_z \times \hat{\mathbf{z}}.$$

In order for this vector to be parallel to $\mathbf{B}_\perp$ as required, the vector $\nabla B_z$ must be perpendicular to $\mathbf{B}_\perp$, and $B_z$ must therefore, like $p$, be a field-line invariant.

Rearranging the cross products above leads to
$$\hat{\mathbf{z}} \times \mathbf{B}_\perp = \nabla A - (\mathbf{\hat z} \cdot \nabla A) \mathbf{\hat z} = \nabla A,$$
and
$$\mathbf{j}_\perp \times B_z\mathbf{\hat{z}} = \frac{B_z}{\mu_0}(\mathbf{\hat z}\cdot\nabla B_z)\mathbf{\hat z} - \frac{1}{\mu_0}B_z\nabla B_z = -\frac{1}{\mu_0} B_z\nabla B_z.$$

These results can be substituted into the expression for $\nabla p$ to yield:
$$\nabla p = -\left[\frac{1}{\mu_0} \nabla^2 A\right]\nabla A - \frac{1}{\mu_0} B_z\nabla B_z.$$

Since $p$ and $B_z$ are constants along a field line, and functions only of $A$, hence $\nabla p = \frac{dp}{dA}\nabla A$ and $\nabla B_z = \frac{d B_z}{dA}\nabla A$. Thus, factoring out $\nabla A$ and rearranging terms yields the Grad–Shafranov equation:
$$\nabla^2 A = -\mu_0 \frac{d}{dA} \left(p + \frac{B_z^2}{2\mu_0}\right).$$

== Derivation in contravariant representation ==
This derivation is only used for Tokamaks, but it can be enlightening. Using the definition of 'The Theory of Toroidally Confined Plasmas 1:3'(Roscoe White), Writing $\vec{B}$ by contravariant basis $(\nabla \Psi, \nabla \phi, \nabla \zeta)$:
$$\vec{B} = \nabla\Psi \times \nabla \phi + \bar{F} \nabla\phi,$$

we have $\vec{j}$:
$$\mu_0 \vec{j} = \nabla \times \vec{B}
= -\Delta^* \Psi \nabla \phi+ \nabla\bar{F} \times \nabla \phi
\quad \text{, where}\ \Delta^* = r\partial_r(r^{-1}\partial_r)  + \partial^2_\phi \text{;}$$

then force balance equation:
$$\mu_0 \vec{j} \times \vec{B}= \mu_0 \nabla p\text{.}$$

Working out, we have:
$$-\Delta^* \Psi = \bar{F} \frac{d\bar{F}}{d \Psi} + \mu_0 R^2 \frac{d p}{d \Psi} \text{.}$$
