= Warren B. Mori =

American plasma physicist

- Born: Warren Bicknell Mori; August 8, 1959 (age 66); Weymouth, Massachusetts
- Education: UC Berkeley (B.S.), UCLA (M.S., Ph.D.)
- Spouse: Dr. Melanie Shim
- Children: Abigail Mori, Elise Mori, Erin Mori
- Awards: James Clerk Maxwell Prize for Plasma Physics (2020)
- Scientific career
- Fields: Plasma physics
- Institutions: UCLA
- Thesis: Theory and Simulations on Beat Wave Excitation of Relativisitic Plasma Waves (1987)
- Doctoral advisor: Francis F. Chen, John M. Dawson, Chandrashekhar J. Joshi

Warren Bicknell Mori (born August 8, 1959) is an American computational plasma physicist and a professor at the University of California, Los Angeles. He was awarded the 2020 James Clerk Maxwell Prize for Plasma Physics for his contributions to the theory and computer simulations of non-linear processes in plasma-based acceleration using kinetic theory, as well as for his research in relativistically intense lasers and beam-plasma interactions.

== Early life and career ==
Mori received a Bachelor of Science from the University of California, Berkeley in 1981. He then went to the University of California, Los Angeles (UCLA) and obtained a Master of Science and a Doctor of Philosophy (Ph.D.) in 1984 and 1987 respectively. For his Ph.D. in electrical engineering, Mori was supervised by plasma physicists Francis F. Chen, John M. Dawson and Chandrashekhar J. Joshi, all of whom were noted for winning the James Clerk Maxwell Prize for Plasma Physics. Mori then remained at UCLA, and has been there ever since.

Mori was a director of UCLA's Institute for Digital Research and Education. He is currently a director of UCLA's Particle-in-Cell and Kinetic Simulation Software Center and Plasma Simulation Group.

== Honors and awards ==
Mori is a fellow of the American Physical Society and the Institute of Electrical and Electronics Engineers.

In 1995, Mori received the International Center for Theoretical Physics Medal for Excellence in Nonlinear Plasma Physics by a Young Researcher. He also won the 2016 Advanced Accelerator Concepts Prize of the Lawrence Berkeley National Laboratory for "his leadership and pioneering contributions in theory and particle-in-cell code simulations of plasma based particle acceleration".

Mori was awarded the 2020 James Clerk Maxwell Prize for Plasma Physics for "leadership in and pioneering contributions to the theory and kinetic simulations of nonlinear processes in plasma-based acceleration, and relativistically intense laser and beam plasma interactions".
