= Xin Guo =

Chinese-American operations researcher and financial engineer

Xin Guo is Chinese and American operations researcher, applied mathematician, and financial engineer. She is a professor at the University of California, Berkeley, where she chairs the Department of Industrial Engineering and Operations Research and holds the Coleman Fung Chair in Financial Modeling. Her research applies probability theory, control theory, and mean-field game theory in financial modeling. Additional topics in her research include medical applications of machine learning, supply chain management, and logistics.

== Education and career ==
Guo received a bachelor's degree in mathematics from the University of Science and Technology of China in 1992. She earned a master's degree in mathematics from the Academia Sinica in 1995, and completed a Ph.D. in mathematics at Rutgers University in 1999. Her dissertation, Inside Information and Stock Fluctuations, was supervised by Lawrence Shepp.

She became a postdoctoral researcher at the IBM Thomas J. Watson Research Center and, in 2000, a research staff member there. In 2003 she moved to Cornell University as an assistant professor of operations research and industrial engineering, earning tenure there as an associate professor in 2007. Meanwhile she had gone on leave from Cornell to move to the University of California, Berkeley, where she was promoted to associate professor again in 2008, and to full professor in 2014. She added an affiliation with the Precision Health Program, joint between Berkeley and the University of California, San Francisco, in 2021.

== Book ==
Guo is a coauthor of the book Quantitative Trading: Algorithms, Analytics, Data, Models, Optimization (with T. L. Lai, H. Shek, and S. Won, Chapman and Hall, 2016; 2nd ed., 2018).
