= Victor Malka =

French physicist (born 1960)

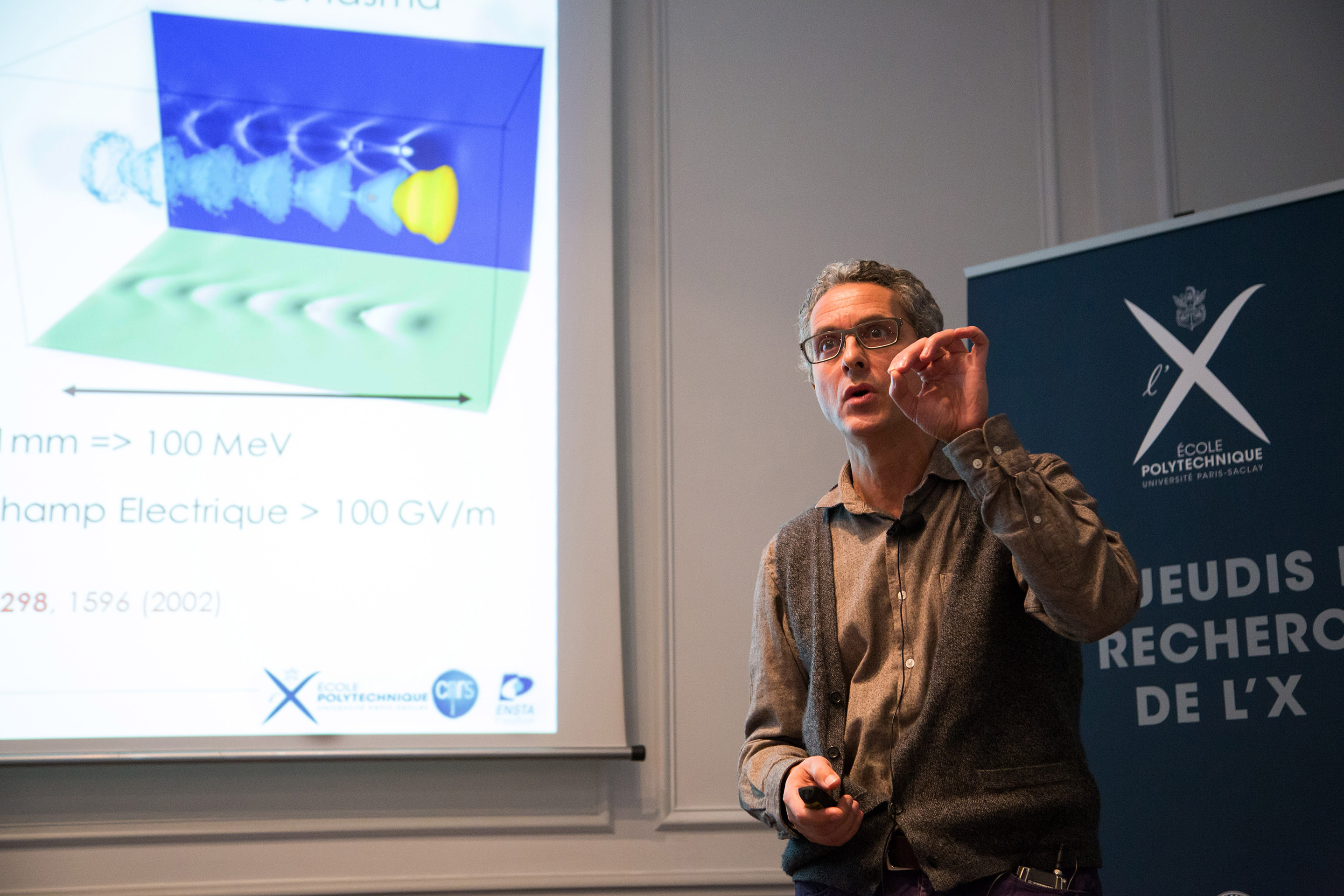
- Born: Casablanca, Morocco
- Education: École Polytechnique (Ph.D.)
- Known for: Laser Plasma Acceleration
- Awards: Julius Springer Prize for Applied Physics (2017); Hannes Alfvén Prize (2019)
- Scientific career
- Fields: Plasma physics

Victor Malka (born 1960 in Casablanca, Morocco) is a French plasma physicist and a pioneer in laser plasma acceleration. In 2004, Malka demonstrated that high energy monoenergetic electron beams could be generated using the technique of laser wakefield acceleration, and subsequently used them to develop compact X-ray and gamma radiation sources with applications in medicine, security technology and phase-contrast imaging. For these contributions to the field, he was awarded the IEEE Particle Accelerator Science and Technology Award in 2007, the Julius Springer Prize for Applied Physics in 2017, the Hannes Alfvén Prize in 2019, and he has been announced as the recipient of the IEEE Marie Sklodowska-Curie Award of 2027.

== Early life and career ==
Malka came from a Jewish family in Morocco and came to France at the age of six, where he grew up in Marseille and in the Parisian suburbs. He studied at the Ecole nationale supérieure de chimie in Rennes and received his doctorate at the École Polytechnique with a dissertation in atomic and plasma physics. From 1990, he then worked at the École Polytechnique for the French National Centre for Scientific Research (CNRS), and from 2004 as Research Director of the Laboratory for Applied Optics (LOA). From 2003 to 2015, he was a professor at the École Polytechnique. He has been a professor at the Weizmann Institute of Science since 2015.

== Publications ==
- Modena, A.; Najmudin, Z.; Dangor, A. E.; Clayton, C. E.; Marsh, K. A.; Joshi, C.; Malka, V.; Darrow, C. B.; Danson, C.; Neely, D.; Walsh, F. N. (1995). "Electron acceleration from the breaking of relativistic plasma waves". Nature. 377 (6550): 606–608. Bibcode:1995Natur.377..606M. doi:10.1038/377606a0. ISSN 0028-0836. S2CID 4301628.
- Amiranoff, F.; Baton, S.; Bernard, D.; Cros, B.; Descamps, D.; Dorchies, F.; Jacquet, F.; Malka, V.; Marquès, J. R.; Matthieussent, G.; Miné, P. (1998). "Observation of Laser Wakefield Acceleration of Electrons". Physical Review Letters. 81 (5): 995–998. Bibcode:1998PhRvL..81..995A. doi:10.1103/physrevlett.81.995. ISSN 0031-9007.
- Gordon, D.; Tzeng, K. C.; Clayton, C. E.; Dangor, A. E.; Malka, V.; Marsh, K. A.; Modena, A.; Mori, W. B.; Muggli, P.; Najmudin, Z.; Neely, D. (1998). "Observation of Electron Energies Beyond the Linear Dephasing Limit from a Laser-Excited Relativistic Plasma Wave". Physical Review Letters. 80 (10): 2133–2136. Bibcode:1998PhRvL..80.2133G. doi:10.1103/physrevlett.80.2133. ISSN 0031-9007.
- Malka, V. (2002). "Electron Acceleration by a Wake Field Forced by an Intense Ultrashort Laser Pulse". Science. 298 (5598): 1596–1600. Bibcode:2002Sci...298.1596M. doi:10.1126/science.1076782. ISSN 0036-8075. PMID 12446903. S2CID 23656376.
- Rousse, Antoine; Phuoc, Kim Ta; Shah, Rahul; Pukhov, Alexander; Lefebvre, Eric; Malka, Victor; Kiselev, Sergey; Burgy, Fréderic; Rousseau, Jean-Philippe; Umstadter, Donald; Hulin, Daniéle (2004-09-23). "Production of a keV X-Ray Beam from Synchrotron Radiation in Relativistic Laser-Plasma Interaction". Physical Review Letters. 93 (13) 135005. Bibcode:2004PhRvL..93m5005R. doi:10.1103/physrevlett.93.135005. ISSN 0031-9007. PMID 15524731. S2CID 2183670.
- Shvets, G.; Fisch, N. J. (1997). "Beam-generated plasma channels for laser wakefield acceleration". The seventh workshop on advanced accelerator concepts. The Seventh Workshop on Advanced Accelerator Concepts. Vol. 398. ASCE. pp. 344–356. Bibcode:1997AIPC..398..344S. doi:10.1063/1.53018. ISBN 1-56396-697-2.
- Faure, J.; Rechatin, C.; Norlin, A.; Lifschitz, A.; Glinec, Y.; Malka, V. (2006). "Controlled injection and acceleration of electrons in plasma wakefields by colliding laser pulses". Nature. 444 (7120): 737–739. Bibcode:2006Natur.444..737F. doi:10.1038/nature05393. ISSN 0028-0836. PMID 17151663. S2CID 4420732.
- Fuchs, J.; Antici, P.; d'Humières, E.; Lefebvre, E.; Borghesi, M.; Brambrink, E.; Cecchetti, C. A.; Kaluza, M.; Malka, V.; Manclossi, M.; Meyroneinc, S. (2005-12-25). "Laser-driven proton scaling laws and new paths towards energy increase". Nature Physics. 2 (1): 48–54. doi:10.1038/nphys199. ISSN 1745-2473. S2CID 121952476.
