= Graham Smith (physicist) =

British physicist

Graham Collingwood Smith is a British physicist. He was a senior staff member of the Brookhaven National Laboratory, where he led the Instrumentation Division.

== Early life and education ==
Smith graduated in physics from Durham University in 1970, and completed his PhD at the same institution in 1974.

== Career ==
Smith was subsequently employed as a research associate at the University of Leicester, where he developed multiwire proportional counters and microchannel plates for X-ray astronomy. His work there included producing the first two-dimensional X-ray image of the Cygnus Loop supernova remnant.

He joined Brookhaven in 1982 as an associate physicist in the Instrumentation Division. In 2012, he was appointed Head of the Instrumentation Division, succeeding Veljko Radeka, and served in this role until 2017.

Smith received Brookhaven's Research and Development Award in 1996 and the IEEE Long Island Regional Award for Contributions to High Energy Physics in 1998. He was named an IEEE Fellow in 2012 for his work in the advancement of detectors for x‑rays, charged particles, and thermal neutrons.

== Selected publications ==
=== Journal articles ===
- Smith, Graham C.; Fischer, J.; Radeka, V. (1984). "Photoelectron range limitations to the spatial resolution for X-rays in gas proportional chambers". IEEE Transactions on Nuclear Science. 31 (1): 111–115. doi:10.1109/TNS.1984.4333221.
- Radeka, V.; Schaknowski, N. A.; Smith, Graham C.; Yu, B. (1998). "High-performance, imaging, thermal neutron detectors". Nuclear Instruments and Methods in Physics Research Section A. 419 (2–3): 642–647. doi:10.1016/S0168-9002(98)00844-4.
- Smith, Graham C. (2006). "Gas-based detectors for synchrotron radiation". Journal of Synchrotron Radiation. 13 (2): 172–179. doi:10.1107/S0909049505033923.
