= Annick Pouquet =

French–American plasma physicist

- Born: Annick Gabrielle Pouquet; 24 December 1946 (age 79); France
- Citizenship: France, United States
- Education: University of Nice (B.S., Ph.D.), University of Paris-VII (M.S.)
- Awards: Hannes Alfvén Prize (2020)
- Scientific career
- Fields: Plasma physics
- Workplaces: Observatoire de Nice; National Center for Atmospheric Research; University of Colorado Boulder
- Thesis: (1976)
- Website: Annick Pouquet webpage

Annick Gabrielle Pouquet (born 24 December 1946) is a computational plasma physicist specializing in plasma turbulence. She was awarded the 2020 Hannes Alfvén Prize for "fundamental contributions to quantifying energy transfer in magneto-fluid turbulence". She currently holds positions in the Laboratory for Atmospheric and Space Physics and National Center for Atmospheric Research at the University of Colorado Boulder.

The Politano–Pouquet relation, an exact scaling law for magnetohydrodynamic turbulence, was partly named after her.

== Early life and career ==
Pouquet graduated with a thèse d'état in astrophysics (French equivalent of Ph.D.) from the Observatoire de Nice in 1976, where she studied turbulence in the presence of a magnetic field using models and direct numerical simulation. She then remained at the observatory upon graduation, eventually becoming the director of the observatory's Cassini Laboratory in 1998.

In 2000, Pouquet joined the National Center for Atmospheric Research (NCAR) at the University of Colorado Boulder as director of the Geophysical Turbulence Program and section head of the Turbulence Numerics Team, where she led efforts to investigate wave-turbulence interactions in the Earth's atmosphere and in space. Pouquet also founded the Earth and Sun System Laboratory as the first acting director in 2004 and became its deputy director between 2006 and 2009.

Pouquet retired in 2013 and became an emeritus Senior Scientist at NCAR. She also became an adjunct professor at the Department of Applied Mathematics, and a visiting scientist of the Laboratory for Atmospheric and Space Physics at the University of Colorado Boulder.

== Honours and awards ==
Pouquet was inducted as a fellow of the American Physical Society in 2004. She was awarded the Hannes Alfvén Prize in 2020. She became a Fellow of the American Geophysical Union (AGU) in 2023 for {\it ``outstanding contributions to understanding geophysical turbulence"}. She was recipient of the Lewis Fry Richardson Medal of the European Geophysical Union (EGU) in 2024 for her {\it ``contributions to theoretical and computational turbulence in neutral and conducting fluids, with a focus on magnetohydrodynamic turbulence and dynamo theory"} {\sl (see https://www.egu.eu/awards-medals/lewis-fry-richardson/2024/annick-pouquet/)}. She was nominated Chevalier de l'Ordre National du M\'erite (Paris/Los Angeles) in 2024 (Journal officiel de la R\'epublique Fran\c caise, texte 3 sur 88, 8 Juin 2024).
