= Tünde Fülöp =

Swedish plasma physicist

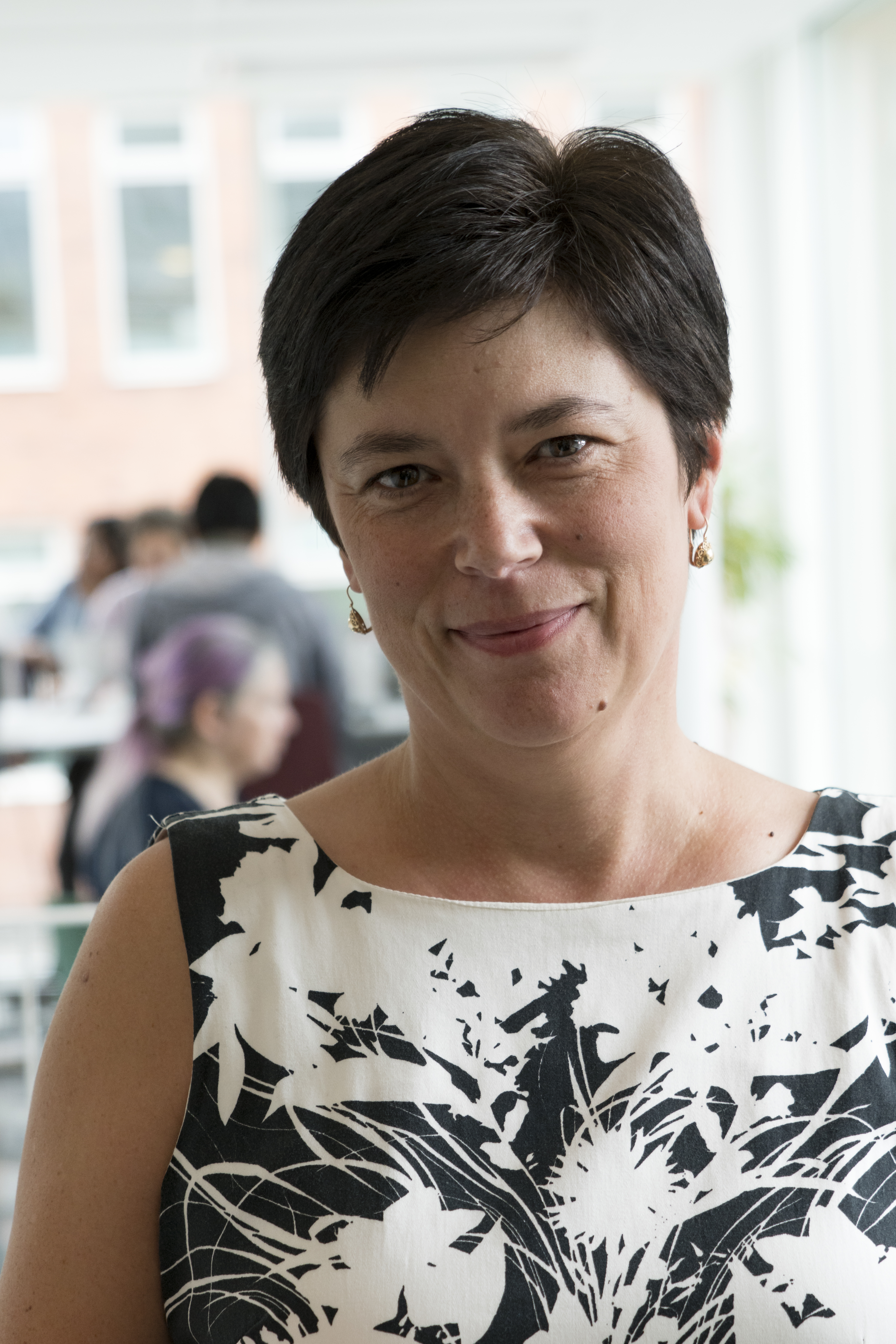
Fülöp in 2018

Tünde-Maria Fülöp (born 1970) is a Swedish theoretical plasma physicist who works as a professor of subatomic, high energy and plasma physics at the Chalmers University of Technology. Her research focus is theoretical plasma physics and its applications in magnetic fusion, laser-plasma interactions, and space and astrophysical plasmas.

== Life and work ==
Fülöp is of Hungarian ethnicity; she is originally from Transylvania in Romania, where she was born in 1970.

She completed a Ph.D. at Chalmers in 1999. She worked at Chalmers as an assistant professor in the Department of Electromagnetics from 2000 to 2003, as an associate professor in the Department of Radio and Space Science from 2004 to 2009, and in her current position as a full professor in the Department of Physics since 2009. She is also a visiting research fellow at Merton College, Oxford.

== Recognition ==
Fülöp was a member of the Young Academy of Sweden from 2011 to 2016. She is a member of the Royal Swedish Academy of Sciences, elected in 2019. She became a member of the Royal Society of Arts and Sciences in Gothenburg in 2021.

Fülöp and Per Helander were the 2024 recipients of the Hannes Alfvén Prize of the European Physical Society Plasma Physics Division, given "for outstanding contributions to theoretical plasma physics, yielding groundbreaking results that significantly impact the understanding and optimization of magnetically confined fusion plasmas".
