= Lawrence Shepp =

American mathematician (1936–2013)

Lawrence Alan Shepp
- Lawrence A. Shepp
- Born: September 9, 1936
- Died: April 23, 2013
- Education: Polytechnic Institute of Brooklyn, B.S. (1958); Princeton University, PhD (1961)
- Awards: IEEE Marie Sklodowska-Curie Award, 2014 (posthumously); IEEE Distinguished Scientist Award, 1979; Lester R. Ford Award, 1979
- Scientific career
- Fields: Probability theory, Statistics, Tomography
- Workplaces: Bell Laboratories; Rutgers University; University of Pennsylvania: (The Wharton School); Columbia University
- Thesis: Recurrent Sums of Random Variables
- Doctoral advisor: William Feller
- Doctoral students: Xin Guo

Lawrence Alan Shepp (September 9, 1936 – April 23, 2013) was an American mathematician specializing in probability theory, statistics, and their applications, including tomography and mathematical finance.

== Early life and education ==
Lawrence A. Shepp was born and grew up in Brooklyn, NY. He graduated with a B.S. degree from the Polytechnic Institute of Brooklyn in 1958. As an undergraduate, he was a winner of the Putnam Competition. He obtained his PhD from Princeton University in 1961 with a dissertation titled Recurrent Sums of Random Variables. His advisor was William Feller.

== Academic career ==
Source for the below dates:

- 1962–1996: Distinguished Member of Technical Staff Bell Laboratories.
- 1997–2010: Rutgers University. (Named Board of Governors Professor in 2004).
- 2010–2013: The Wharton School of the University of Pennsylvania.
- 1973–1997: Columbia University.
- 1978–1992: Stanford University.
- Co-Editor (with Zang-Hee Cho) of the International Journal of Imaging Systems and Technology.

== Main contributions ==
Shepp's work in medical image reconstruction extended over more than three decades. In 1974, he and Benjamin F. Logan introduced a two-dimensional mathematical phantom consisting of ten ellipses designed to approximate the anatomy of the human head. The model was used to evaluate computed tomography (CT) image reconstruction algorithms with respect to accuracy, resolution, and noise sensitivity. The resulting Shepp-Logan phantom later became a widely used benchmark in medical imaging research, including for CT, MRI, and PET.

In 1978, Shepp and Joseph Kruskal published a survey article explaining the mathematical principles of computerized tomography to a broad mathematical audience. The paper received the Lester R. Ford Award from the Mathematical Association of America.

Shepp is best known for his contribution to emission tomography. With Yehuda Vardi, he developed and analyzed the maximum likelihood approach to image reconstruction in PET. Their 1982 paper introduced an iterative algorithm that became influential in the field and has garnered more than 6,600 citations according to Google Scholar.

Another area of Shepp's research was mathematical finance. In 1993, he and Albert Shiryaev introduced the Russian option, a type of perpetual option whose payoff depends on the historical maximum of the underlying asset price. The Russian option became a well-known example in the theory of optimal stopping and stimulated further research in martingale theory and Brownian motion with drift.

== Awards and honors ==
- Member of the National Academy of Sciences, 1989
- Fellow of the American Mathematical Society, 2012
- Member of the Institute of Medicine, 1992
- IEEE Distinguished Scientist Award, 1979
- IEEE Marie Sklodowska-Curie Award, 2014 (posthumously)
- Lester R. Ford Award (with Joseph Kruskal), 1979

== Controversies ==
As part of a scientific exchange program between the United States and the Soviet Union, Shepp arrived in Moscow in August 1966 to work at the Steklov Mathematical Institute. He was scheduled to work there for 10 months, but in January 1967 Soviet authorities terminated his visit and "expelled" him from the country. Soviet officials accused him of activities incompatible with the exchange program's terms and conditions, including disseminating anti-Soviet propaganda. No criminal charges were filed.

In 1992, Shepp organized a letter signed by a group of American mathematicians and addressed to Frank Press, president of the National Academy of Sciences (NAS), concerning Russophobia, a book by Russian mathematician Igor Shafarevich, who was a foreign associate of the NAS. The letter described the book as antisemitic and argued that its content was inconsistent with the standards expected of NAS members. In response, the NAS Council issued a statement condemning the book's antisemitic content, and Press communicated the Council's position to Shafarevich. Press noted that the NAS had no procedure for expelling members or foreign associates, but suggested that Shafarevich consider whether continued association with the Academy was appropriate. Shafarevich rejected the criticism, denied that the book was antisemitic, and refused to resign.

== See also ==
- Fishburn–Shepp inequality
- Shepp–Logan phantom
- Shepp–Olkin conjecture
- Coupon collector's problem
- Discrete tomography
- Dubins path
- Gaussian process
- Hook length formula
- Parallel parking problem
- Sieve estimator
- Ridge function
