= David R. Nygren =

Particle Physicist who invented time projection chambers

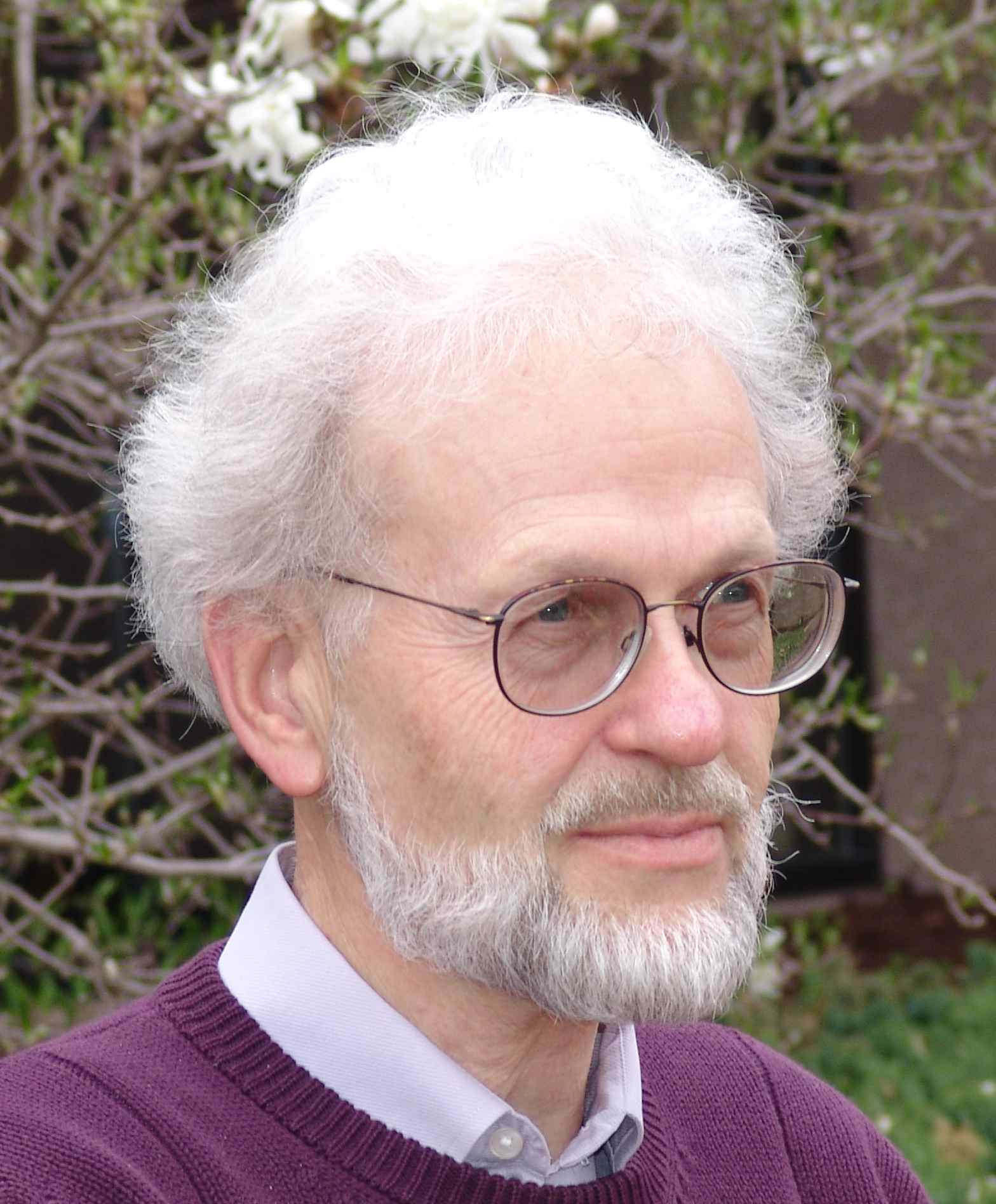
- Born: December 30, 1938 (age 87)
- Education: B.A. Whitman College (1960), Ph.D. University of Washington (1967)
- Known for: Invention of Time projection chamber
- Awards: E. O. Lawrence Award (1985); Panofsky Prize (1998); IEEE Marie Sklodowska-Curie Award (2018)
- Scientific career
- Fields: Particle Physics
- Workplaces: University of Texas, Arlington, Lawrence Berkeley National Laboratory, University of California, Berkeley

David Robert Nygren (born December 30, 1938) is a particle physicist known for his invention of the time projection chamber. He is currently a Presidential Distinguished Professor of Physics at the University of Texas at Arlington. He has worked at Lawrence Berkeley National Laboratory since 1973. He has been called "the most distinguished developer of particle detection instruments in the country".

Nygren earned his B.A. degree at Whitman College in 1960, and his Ph.D. at the University of Washington in 1967. He is a fellow of the American Physical Society. He did postdoctoral work with Jack Steinberger at Columbia University. He made important improvements to the barium tagging method first proposed by Michael Moe in 1991 for neutrino detection.

== Honors and awards ==
- 2018 - IEEE Marie Sklodowska-Curie Award
- 2015 - APS Division of Particles and Fields Instrumentation Award
- 2015 - Aldo Menzione award from Frontier Detectors for Frontier Physics Society awarded at 13th Pisa Meeting on Advanced Detectors
- 2015 - Fellow of the National Academy of Inventors
- 2013 - Lifetime Achievement Award from Lawrence Berkeley National Laboratory
- 2008 - Honorary doctorate, Stockholm University
- 2000 - Member, National Academy of Sciences
- 1998 - W.K.H. Panofsky Prize in Experimental Particle Physics
- 1995 - Distinguished Scientist at Lawrence Berkeley National Laboratory
- 1985 - Ernest Orlando Lawrence Award
