= Sergei V. Bulanov =

Russian physicist

- Сергей Владимирович Буланов
- Born: Sergei Vladimirovich Bulanov; August 16, 1947 (age 79); USSR
- Education: Moscow Institute of Physics and Technology (MS (1971) (PhD 1974)
- Awards: State Prize of the USSR (1982); Hannes Alfvén Prize (2016); Order of Rising Sun with Gold Rays and Rosette (2020)
- Scientific career
- Fields: Theoretical physics

Sergei Vladimirovich Bulanov, (Russian: Сергей Владимирович Буланов, romanized: Sergei Bulanov; born August 16, 1947) is a Russian physicist. He received the 1983 State Prize of the USSR, the 2016 Hannes Alfvén Prize (with Hartmut Zohm) for "contributions to the development of large-scale next-step devices in high-temperature plasma physics research", and the Order of Rising Sun with Gold Rays and Rosette in 2020.

== Life and career ==
Bulanov studied theoretical physics and astrophysics at the Moscow Institute of Physics and Technology in the 1960s. He was a student of Sergei Ivanovich Syrovatskii and Vitaly Ginzburg.

He is a Distinguished Research Fellow at the National Institute for Quantum and Radiological Science and Technology in Kyoto, Japan and a Head of the Department at the ELI-Beamlines, Dolni Brezany in Czech Republic.

== Scientific contributions ==
Bulanov proposed the idea of relativistic mirrors for generating X-rays, whereby a laser beam is reflected by plasma waves and is split up by nonlinear interactions to form a thin layer of relativistic electrons. They were intended to be an alternative to synchrotron radiation sources and free electron lasers, and were used in the development of compact radiation sources and for basic research in quantum electrodynamics (e.g. electron-positron pair production in vacuum). Bulanov has also worked on particle acceleration using laser plasmas and he is a co-author of an idea that proposed using the laser accelerated ions for cancer therapy.
