= Veljko Radeka =

- Education: University of Zagreb
- Scientific career
- Fields: Electronics Engineering, Physics
- Workplaces: Brookhaven National Laboratory

Veljko Radeka is a Croatian-American electronics engineer and physicist renowned for work in radiation detector instrumentation.

== Career at Brookhaven National Laboratory ==
In 1962, Radeka joined Brookhaven National Laboratory in Upton, New York, as a visiting scientist. He became a staff member of BNL's Instrumentation Division in 1966 and was appointed as the division head in 1972. He held this role for four decades until Graham Smith succeeded him in 2012.

== Contributions to science and technology ==
Radeka's work has been instrumental in advancing radiation measurement techniques. He developed circuits capable of detecting extremely rare radiation signals amidst background noise, which were crucial for solar neutrino experiments. This innovation contributed to Raymond Davis receiving the Nobel Prize in Physics in 2002.

Additionally, Radeka played a pivotal role in the development of the first noble liquid argon calorimeter, a device essential for measuring the energy of subatomic particles. This technology was integral to the ATLAS experiment at the Large Hadron Collider, leading to the discovery of the Higgs boson.

Beyond particle physics, his innovations have influenced various disciplines, including medical imaging. His research group developed a medical scanner that combines positron emission tomography and nuclear magnetic resonance imaging into a single instrument, enhancing diagnostic capabilities.

== Awards and recognition ==
- IEEE Centennial Medal (1984)
- Harold Wheeler Award (2009)
- IEEE Marie Sklodowska-Curie Award (2013)
- Inaugural APS Division of Particles and Fields Instrumentation Award (2015)
- ICFA Instrumentation Award (2022)

Radeka is a Life Fellow of the Institute of Electrical and Electronics Engineers and a Fellow of the American Physical Society. Throughout his career, he has authored over 200 publications and holds two instrumentation patents.
