= Mikhail Rabinovich =

Russian physicist and neuroscientist (1941–2025)

- Born: 20 April 1941; Gorky, Russian SFSR, Soviet Union
- Died: 31 March 2025 (aged 83)
- Parent(s): Dora Rapoport; Israel Rabinovich

Mikhail Izrailevich Rabinovich (Russian: Михаи́л Изра́илевич Рабино́вич; 20 April 1941 – 31 March 2025) was a Russian-American physicist and neuroscientist working in the field of nonlinear dynamics and its applications. His work helped shape the understanding of dynamical systems.

== Life and career ==
Rabinovich was born on 20 April 1941 in former Gorky, Russian SFSR, Soviet Union, into a family of Soviet Jews: Dora Rapoport and Israel Rabinovich. His father was a professor of physical chemistry at Gorky State University and Mikhail developed an interest in sciences at an early age. At the age of 16, he was accepted to the Radio Physics department of the Gorky State University. In 1963, Rabinovich began working under the supervision of Andrey Gaponov-Grekhov and in 1967 he received a PhD in physics and mathematics. In 1974, Mikhail received a D.Sc. from the Institute for Physical Problems of the Soviet Academy of Science chaired by Pyotr Kapitsa. In 1986, he co-authored chapters on the evolution of turbulence in the seminal textbook Course of Theoretical Physics (Fluid Mechanics Volume) of Lifshitz and Landau. The book Oscillations and Waves in Linear and Nonlinear Systems was published in 1989. Mikhail Rabinovich became a member of the Russian Academy of Sciences in 1991. In 1992, Mikhail accepted a faculty position at the Institute for Nonlinear Science at UCSD in La Jolla, CA. In the same year a book with Gaponov-Grekhov, Nonlinearities in Action is published. His first book written in the United States, Introduction to Nonlinear Dynamics for Physicists came out in 1993. In 1999, Mikhail was invited to the Pontifical Academy of Sciences in Vatican City to give a lecture on global and complex processes in physics. There he met with Pope John Paul II. In 2000, Mikhail published his latest book on physics The dynamics of Patterns.

Mikhail Rabinovich published over 250 peer-reviewed articles in leading scientific journals (Science, Neuron, Journal of Neuroscience, PLoS Computational Biology, Reviews of Modern Physics, Physics of Fluids, Physical Review Letters) that are actively cited (over 3,000 citations). In 2012, Rabinovich published his first book on neuroscience, Principles of Brain Dynamics: Global State Interactions. He lived in La Jolla, California, and was a research scientist in the Bio Circuits Institute at UCSD. Rabinovich died on 31 March 2025, at the age of 83.

== Selected literary works ==
- Up the hill (2001), ISBN 5-89533-043-6.
- Rings of time (2002), ISBN 5-89533-061-4.
- Oars (2005), ISBN 5-89533-100-9.
- Mim (2009), ISBN 978-5-89533-211-5

== Sources ==
- Personal Website
- Rabinovich on Google Scholar
- Bio Circuits Institute
