= Paul-Henri Rebut =

French physicist (1935–2026)

- Born: 2 February 1935
- Died: 3 November 2026 (aged 91)
- Education: École polytechnique
- Occupation: Physicist

Paul-Henri Rebut (2 February 1935 – 3 November 2026) was a French physicist, working in nuclear fusion.

== Life and career ==
Rebut was born on 2 February 1935. He started his research on nuclear fusion with the Commissariat à l'énergie atomique (CEA) in 1958 after having studied physics at the École polytechnique, Paris and the Ecole des Poudres.

From 1970 to 1973, he contributed to the creation of TFR.

In 1973, he was appointed head of the design team for JET, at the Culham laboratory, near to Oxford.

In 1979, he was appointed deputy director at JET, in charge of its construction, operation and development.

He was made director of JET in September 1985. Under his direction, JET made a major contribution to research into nuclear fusion, including the first demonstration in November 1991 of a significant quantity of fusion energy originating from a thermonuclear magnetically confined plasma.

From 1992 to 1994 he became the director of ITER Design Activities, based in San Diego, United States.

Rebut died on 3 November 2026, at the age of 91.

== Honours ==
- 1978 Chevalier de l'Ordre national du Mérite
- 1984 Chevalier de la Légion d'honneur
- 2006 Hannes Alfvén Prize
