= Bernhard Helander =

Bernhard Helander (1958–2001) was an anthropologist and well known scholar on Somalia. He published on Somali pastoralism, politics and power, poverty, Somali medicine, kinship, Somali sociability and modes of communication, as well as contemporary political processes, welfare, development and peace in Somalia. Before his death, Helander was a lecturer in cultural anthropology at Uppsala University.

He started his research in Somalia in 1982 and rose to become one of the world's major experts on Somali culture and society. He served in the early 1990s in the UN think tank headed by ambassador Mohamed Sahnoun. He edited the Somalia News Update, an Internet newsletter, which in the 1990s was very influential in disseminating knowledge and forming opinion on current affairs in Somali. During these years he also served in the UN think tank on Somalia.

== Publications ==
Helander, Bernhard (2003): The slaughtered camel. Coping with fictitious descent among the Hubeer of Southern Somalia. Uppsala: Acta Universitatis Upsaliensis (Acta Universitatis Upsaliensis. Uppsala studies in cultural anthropology). ISBN 91-554-5736-3 (91-554-5736-3)

Helander, Bernhard (1999): Somalia. In: Westerlund, David; Svanberg, Ingvar (Hg.): Islam outside the Arab world. Richmond Surrey: Curzon, S. 39–55. ISBN 0-312-22691-8

Helander, Bernhard (1997): Clanship, Kinship and community Among the Rahanweyn. In: Adam, Hussein Mohamed; Ford, Richard B. (Hg.): Mending Rips in the Sky. Options for Somali Communities in the 21st Century: Red Sea Press .

== Sources ==
- https://web.archive.org/web/20110616100919/http://www.somaliawatch.org/archivedec01/020103101.htm
- Turton, D. (2003). The Politician, the Priest and the Anthropologist: living beyond conflict in Southwestern Ethiopia. Ethnos: Journal of Anthropology, 68(1), 5-26. doi:10.1080/0014184032000060344
