= Plasma Physics Reports =

Scientific journal on plasma physics

- Discipline: Plasma science and technology
- Language: English
- Edited by: Valentin Smirnov

Publication details
- Former name: Soviet Journal of Plasma Physics (1975—1993)
- History: 1975—present
- Publisher: Springer, Pleiades Publishing
- Frequency: Monthly
- Impact factor: 1.1 (2024)

Standard abbreviations
- ISO 4: Plasma Phys. Rep.

Indexing
- CODEN: PPHREM
- ISSN: 1063-780X (print); 1562-6938 (web)

Links
- Journal homepage; Online access; Online archive

Plasma Physics Reports is a peer-reviewed scientific journal co-published monthly by Springer Science+Business Media and Pleiades Publishing. It covers developments in plasma science and technology, including plasma diagnostics, fusion power and astrophysical plasma. The journal was established under the name Soviet Journal of Plasma Physics in 1975 and featured English translations of the articles from the journal Fizika Plasmy; it received its current name in 1993. Its current editor-in-chief is Valentin Smirnov (Kurchatov Institute).

== Abstracting and indexing ==
The journal is abstracted and indexed in:

- Current Contents/Electronics & Telecommunications Collection
- Current Contents/Physical, Chemical & Earth Sciences
- EBSCO databases
- Inspec
- ProQuest databases
- Science Citation Index Expanded
- Scopus

According to the Journal Citation Reports, the journal has a 2024 impact factor of 1.1.
