= Thomas W. L. Sanford =

American physicist

- Education: University of Washington (B.S.); Columbia University (M.A., Ph.D.)
- Known for: Z-pinch multi-wire array
- Awards: Hannes Alfvén Prize (2005)
- Scientific career
- Fields: Plasma physics
- Thesis: (1973)
- Doctoral advisor: Leon M. Lederman

Thomas W. L. "Tom" Sanford (born around 1945) is an American plasma physicist who developed a multi-wire array for use in a pulsed Z-pinch plasma system which resulted in a breakthrough for inertial confinement fusion (ICF) research. In 2005, he was awarded the Hannes Alfvén Prize with Malcolm Haines and Valentin Smirnov for his contributions to the field.

== Life and career ==
Sanford studied mathematics and physics at the University of Washington and obtained a bachelor's degree magna cum laude in 1965. He then went on to Columbia University, where he completed his master's degree in physics in 1967 and received his doctorate from Leon M. Lederman in 1973. Upon his graduation, he worked at the Rutherford Appleton Laboratory (with T. G. Walker), at CERN and at the Brookhaven National Laboratory (with Samuel C. C. Ting). In 1982, he was a member of Sandia National Laboratories and was involved in the development of the HERMES III (High Energy Radiation Megavolt Electron Source) electron accelerator, which was used to generate X-rays and gamma rays to simulate the effects of nuclear explosions. In 1991, he became a Distinguished Member of the laboratory.

== Scientific contributions ==
Sanford further developed the Z-pinch with wire arrangements, which had previously been successfully tested in Russia by Valentin Smirnov, via the Saturn experiment to the Z-machine. It was the strongest X-ray source in the mid-2000s (2 megajoules in 6 nanoseconds with 200 terawatts of power), which also generated record temperatures of 2 to 3 billion Kelvin for a short time. Two cylindrical shells of wire assemblies, through which a high current (20 megaamps) is sent, implode onto a central target, where high-intensity X-rays are generated for inertial fusion experiments or other studies. This was studied with the dynamic hohlraum X-ray source.

== Honors and awards ==
Sanford has been a fellow of the American Physical Society since 2000.
