= Olle Helander =

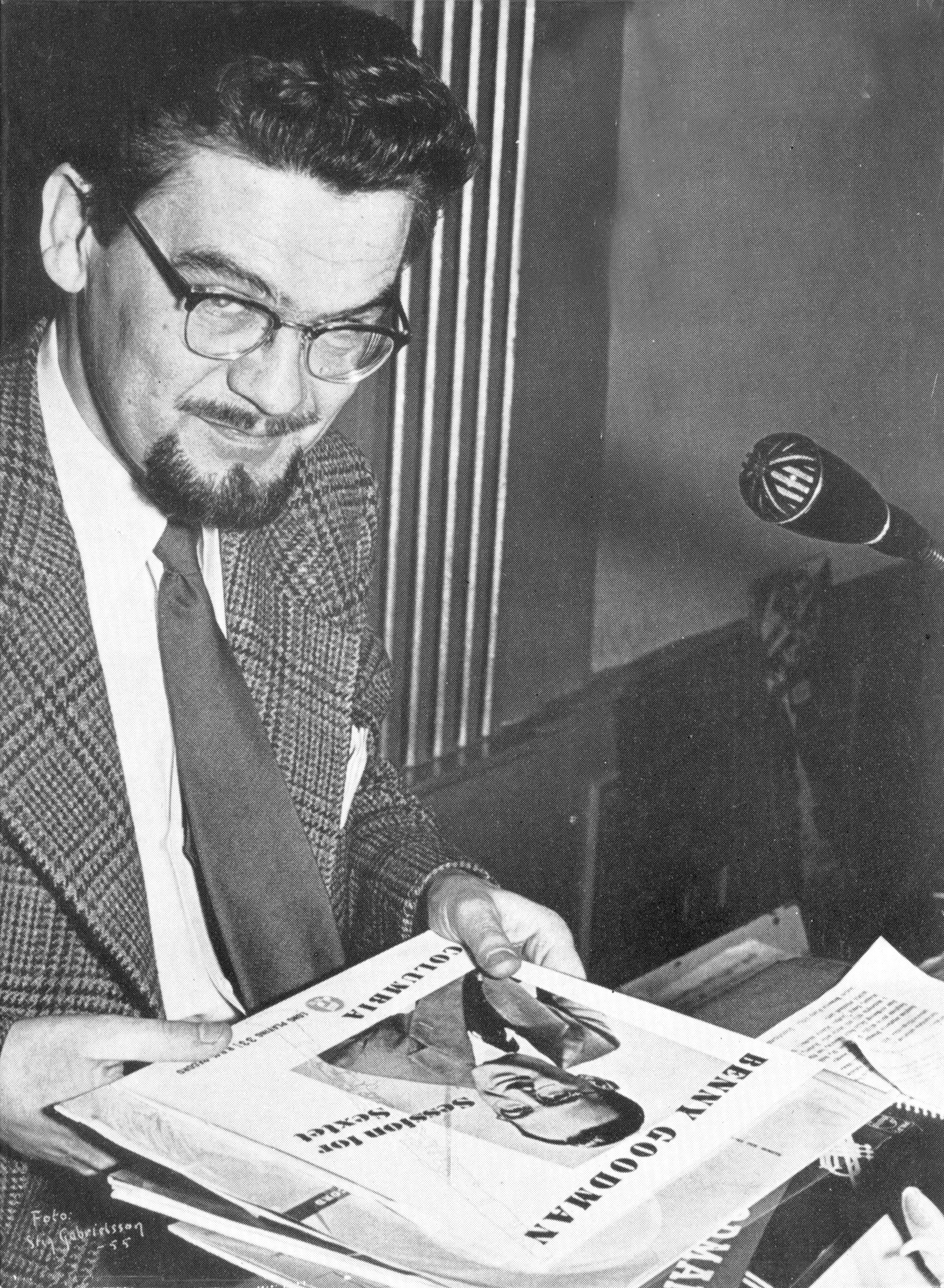
Helander in 1955

Olle Helander (2 August 1919 in Stockholm – 15 April 1976) was a Swedish music journalist, author, producer and presenter of radio and TV. From 1950 he was head of jazz at Sveriges Radio and 1956 took the initiative to Radiobandet. Material from the radio series Blueskvarter has since been released on CD. From 1965 he was hired as a TV producer responsible for the Swedish outtakes to Melodifestivalen during the end of the 60s.

== Bibliography ==
- Jazzens väg (1947)
- I jazzens kvarter (1964)
