= Per Helander =

Swedish plasma physicist (born 1967)

- Born: 1967 (age 58–59); Umeå, Sweden
- Education: Chalmers University of Technology (M.S., Ph.D.)
- Relatives: Dick Helander (grandfather)
- Awards: Hannes Alfvén Prize (2024)
- Scientific career
- Fields: Plasma physics
- Workplaces: Culham Centre for Fusion Energy; Chalmers University of Technology; Max Planck Institute for Plasma Physics; University of Greifswald
- Thesis: Dynamics of Fast Ions in Tokamaks (1994)

Per Helander (born 1967) is a Swedish theoretical plasma physicist and a leading scientist in the world in stellarator physics. He is the head of Stellarator Theory Division at the Max Planck Institute for Plasma Physics.

== Education and career ==
Helander was born in Umeå, his grandfather is Dick Helander, the former bishop of Strängnäs.

Helander studied physics at Chalmers University of Technology, where he received a Master's degree in plasma physics in 1991. Subsequently, he earned a PhD degree at the same institution in theoretical physics in 1994 with a thesis titled Dynamics of Fast Ions in Tokamaks. His doctoral advisors were Mietek Lisak and Dan Anderson.

Afterwards, Helander was a postdoctoral fellow at Massachusetts Institute of Technology in the group of Dieter Sigmar. He then joined the theory department at Culham Science Centre (now Culham Centre for Fusion Energy) in Abingdon of the United Kingdom Atomic Energy Authority in 1996. He was an adjunct professor at Chalmers University of Technology from 2002 till 2005.

In 2006, Helander was appointed Scientific Fellow at the Greifswald Branch of the Max Planck Institute for Plasma Physics. He succeeded Jürgen Nührenberg, an eminent theorist who had developed the physics basis of Greifswald's Wendelstein 7-X stellarator. Helander was also appointed to a chair for theoretical plasma physics at the University of Greifswald.

== Honours and awards ==
In 2023, Helander was named a Fellow of the American Physical Society. In 2024, Helander was awarded the Hannes Alfvén Prize along with Tünde Fülöp for outstanding contributions to theoretical plasma physics, yielding groundbreaking results that significantly impact the understanding and optimization of magnetically confined fusion plasmas.
