= WEST (formerly Tore Supra) =

French tokamak

Coordinates: 43.703626°N 5.764968°E

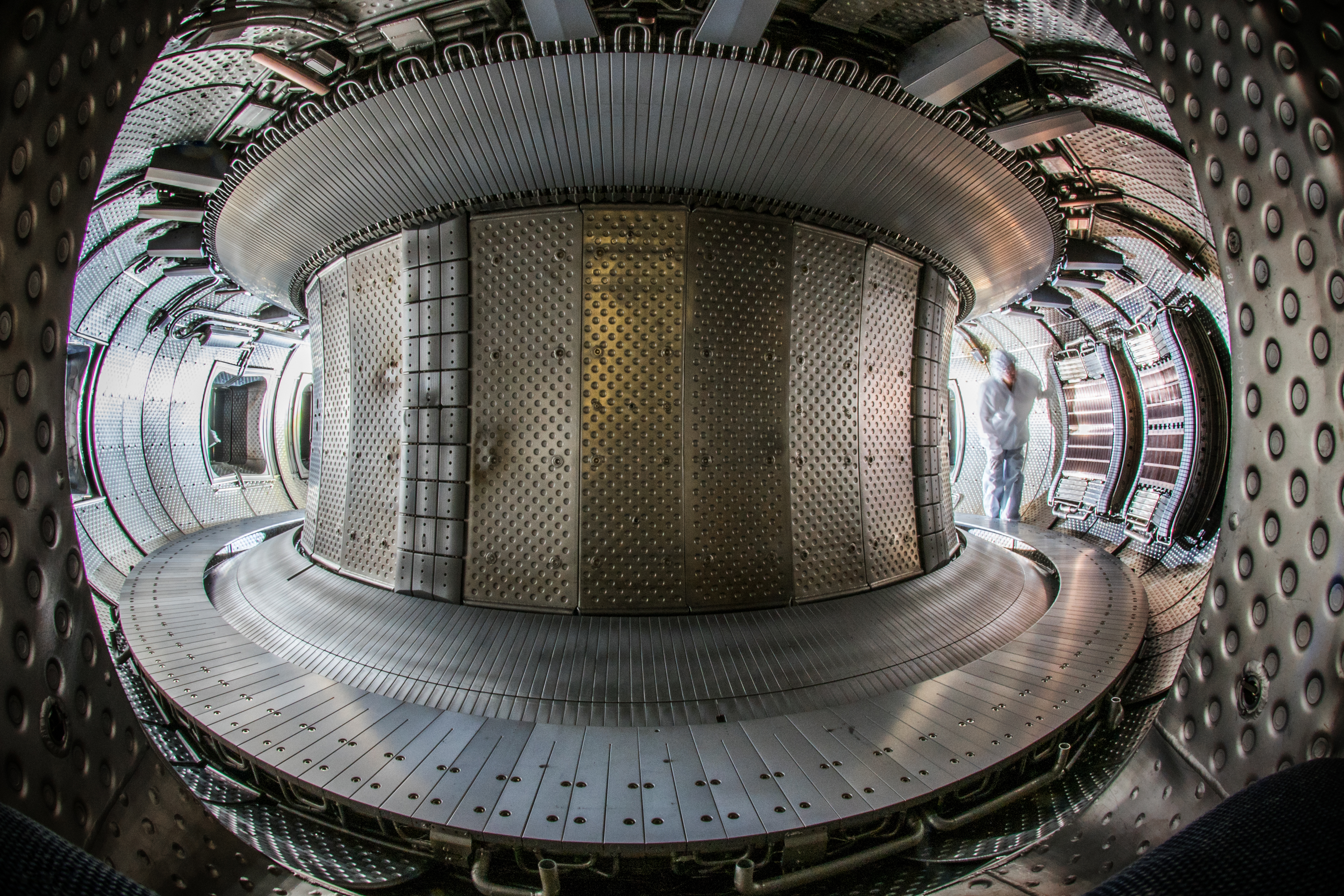
- WEST plasma chamber
- Device type: Tokamak
- Location: Cadarache, France

Technical specifications
- Major radius: 2.5 m
- Minor radius: 0.50 m
- Magnetic field: 3.7 T (toroidal)
- Heating power: 17 MW

History
- Year(s) of operation: 2016–

The WEST, or Tungsten (chemical symbol "W") Environment in Steady-state Tokamak (formerly Tore Supra), is a French tokamak that originally began operating as Tore Supra after the discontinuation of TFR (Tokamak of Fontenay-aux-Roses) and of Petula (in Grenoble). The original name came from the words torus and superconductor, as Tore Supra was for a long time the only tokamak of this size with superconducting toroidal magnets, allowing the creation of a strong permanent toroidal magnetic field. After a major upgrade to install tungsten walls and a divertor, the tokamak was renamed WEST (the name alludes to EAST, another tokamak).

WEST is situated at the nuclear research center of Cadarache, Bouches-du-Rhône in Provence, one of the sites of the Commissariat à l'Énergie Atomique. Tore Supra operated between 1988 and 2010. Its goal was to create long-duration plasmas. The upgrade to WEST took place between 2013 and 2016. WEST has been operating since 2016.

Tore Supra long held the record for the longest plasma duration time for a tokamak at 6 minutes 30 seconds, with over 1000 MJ of energy injected and extracted in 2003, and it allowed researchers to test critical parts of equipment such as plasma facing wall components or superconducting magnets that will be used in its successor, ITER. As ITER faced long delays, WEST remained in operation and on 12 February 2025, it set a new record for duration at 22 minutes and 17 seconds, while operating at lower temperatures.

== Device parameters ==
Tore Supra as of 1988:

- Major plasma radius (machine centre to plasma centre) : 2.25 m
- Minor plasma radius: 0.70 m
- Toroidal magnetic field on the center of the plasma core: 4.5 T
- Plasma current: 1.7 MA
- Longest plasma discharge (predicted): 1000 s
- Auxiliary plasma heating (ion and electron cyclotron resonance heating and lower hybrid current drive): 20 MW

Tore Supra as of 2006 (parameters essentially the same):

- Weight of NbTi superconductor : ~45 tonnes
- Maximum magnetic field on the conductor : 9.0 T
- Total magnetic energy : 600 MJ
- Weight of magnetic circuit : 830 tonnes

WEST as of 2018:

- Major plasma radius (machine centre to plasma centre) : 2.5 m
- Minor plasma radius: 0.50 m
- Toroidal magnetic field on the center of the plasma core: 3.7 T
- Plasma current: 1 MA
- Longest plasma discharge (predicted): 1000 s
- Auxiliary plasma heating (ion and electron cyclotron resonance heating and lower hybrid current drive): 17 MW

== Tore Supra Operation 1988–2010 ==
By 1998 it had produced over 20,000 plasma shots of up to 2 minutes duration.

Between 2000 and 2002 the vacuum chamber was completely renewed/relined. increasing the power extraction by active cooling to 25 MW (to allow longer plasma duration).

In December 2003, it achieved a record 6.5 minute plasma This was plasma shot #32299, Lower hybrid power ~2.9 MW, total injected energy ~1.1 GJ, plasma current ~500 kA, nl ~ 2.6 × 10^{19} m^{−2}.

== WEST ==
Beginning in March 2013 Tore Supra underwent an extensive refit, including new poloidal coils to achieve diverted operation, a new cooling system, and all-metal cladding, mainly for experiments on tungsten divertor technology for ITER. The reactor was renamed WEST, for "Tungsten (chemical symbol "W") Environment in Steady-state Tokamak". WEST achieved first plasma in December 2016. WEST was able to maintain a plasma for 1,337 seconds on February 12, 2025.
