= Dick Helander =

Swedish bishop

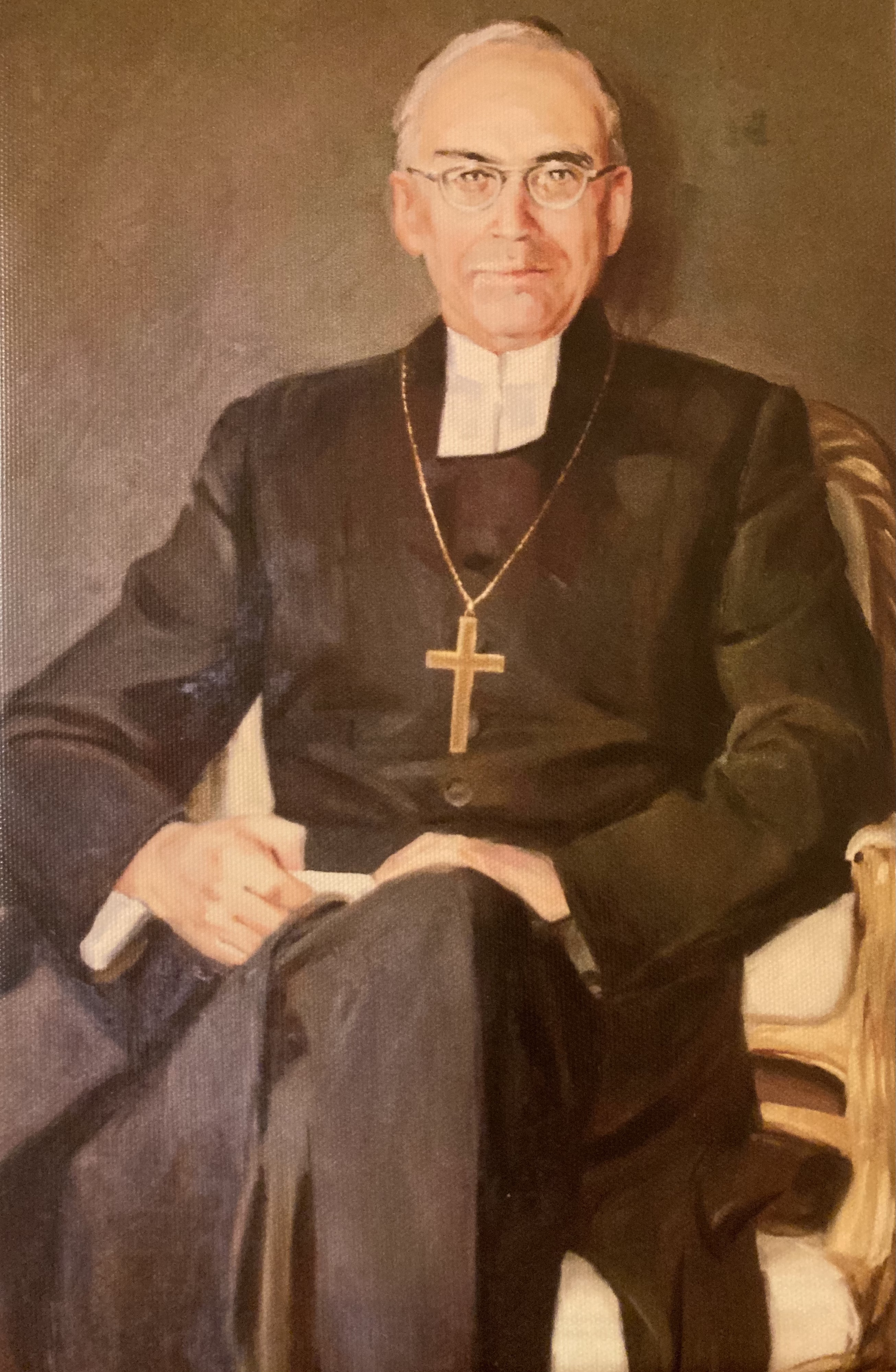
- Portrait of Helander by Helen Shchukina, c. 1953-54.
- Born: Dick Adolf Viktor Helander; 23 June 1896; Nyköping, Sweden
- Died: 14 August 1978 (aged 82); Gothenburg, Sweden
- Occupation: Bishop
- Years active: 1952–1954 (bishop); 1923–1978 (life)
- Relatives: Per Helander (grandson)

Dick Adolf Viktor Helander (23 June 1896 – 14 August 1978) was a Swedish bishop in Strängnäs diocese between 1952 and 1953 and a professor. He lost his position as a bishop in the aftermath of a defamation case.

== Life and career ==
Helander was born 23 June 1896 in Nyköping, and graduated from Karolinska college in Örebro in 1915. After studies in Uppsala and Gothenburg Helander received a fil, cand. in philosophy in 1918. Helander officially became a priest on 20 May 1923 in Lunds congregation. In 1931 he became a docent in practical theology at Lund University. In 1952, Helander was named bishop of Strängnäs. Helander died on 14 August 1978, when he was hit by a tram in Gothenburg. He was buried at the Mariachurch on 30 August 1978.

== Defamation case ==
On 22 December 1953, Helander was indicted in connection with libelous letters defaming other candidates, that he was claimed to have sent to members of Strängnäs bishopric. He was prosecuted and sentenced against his own denials for defamation. He was expelled from his bishop position. The sentence was appealed. In 1954 the sentence was upheld by Svea Court of Appeal and other appeals were not brought up. The affair was known by the name Helandermålet (meaning The Helander case).

Helander later wrote several books proclaiming his innocence about writing the letters. In 2002, new tests on the saliva from the letters proved that Helander had not posted the letters of recommendation personally.

== Bibliography ==
- Bönbok - Stora bedjares böner
- Nattvardsbok
- Handbok vid jordfästning
- Handbok för kyrkliga förrättningar
- Den liturgiska utvecklingen i Sverige 1811-1894
- Svensk psalmhistoria (1946)
- Herdabrev till Strängnäs stift (1953)
- I domkyrkans skugga (1955)
- Oskyldigt dömd (1957)
