= Mordvinovo =

Mordvinovo Мордвиново
- Village
- Location within Vladimir Oblast Location within Russia
- Coordinates: 55°15′N 40°35′E
- Country: Russia
- Region: Vladimir Oblast
- District: Gus-Khrustalny District
- Time zone: UTC+3:00

Mordvinovo (Russian: Мордвиново) is a rural locality (a village) in Posyolok Velikodvorsky, Gus-Khrustalny District, Vladimir Oblast, Russia. The population was 1 as of 2010.

== Geography ==
Mordvinovo is located on the Dandur River, 56 km south of Gus-Khrustalny (the district's administrative centre) by road. Kharlamovo is the nearest rural locality.
