= Acoustical Physics =

Scientific journal on acoustics

- Discipline: Acoustics
- Language: English
- Edited by: Igor B. Esipov

Publication details
- History: 2000–present
- Publisher: Springer Science+Business Media
- Frequency: Bimonthly
- Impact factor: 1.2 (2024)

Standard abbreviations
- ISO 4: Acoust. Phys.

Indexing
- ISSN: 1063-7710 (print); 1562-6865 (web)

Links
- Journal homepage; Online access; Online archive

Acoustical Physics is a peer-reviewed scientific journal published bimonthly by Springer Science+Business Media. It covers fundamental and applied research in all branches of acoustics, including physical acoustics, underwater acoustics, and acoustical engineering. It was established in 2000 and its editor-in-chief is Igor B. Esipov (Gubkin Russian State University of Oil and Gas).

== Abstracting and indexing ==
The journal is abstracted and indexed in:

- Current Contents/Engineering, Computing & Technology
- Current Contents/Physical, Chemical & Earth Sciences
- EBSCO databases
- Ei Compendex
- Inspec
- ProQuest databases
- Science Citation Index Expanded
- Scopus

According to the Journal Citation Reports, the journal has a 2024 impact factor of 1.2.
