= Bootstrap current =

In a toroidal fusion power device, a plasma is confined within a donut-shaped cylinder. If the gas pressure of the plasma varies across the radius of the cylinder, a self-generated current will spontaneously arise within the plasma, due to collisions between trapped particles and passing particles. This current is called the bootstrap current, and is commonly found in tokamak fusion devices. The tokamak uses a combination of external magnets and a current driven in the plasma to create a stable confinement system. One goal of advanced tokamak designs is to maximize the bootstrap current, and thereby reduce or eliminate the need for an external current driver. This could dramatically reduce the cost and complexity of the device.

From a kinetic point of view, the bootstrap current is the effect of trapped particles (which practically lie on poloidal plane) and density gradient: the poloidal current due to trapped particles motion is unbalanced since the density is not constant, therefore the bootstrap current is needed to "close the circuit".

== See also ==
- Persistent current
