= Valentin Smirnov (physicist) =

Valentin Panteleimonovich Smirnov (Russian: Валенти́н Пантелеи́монович Cмирно́в, b. 2 October 1937), is a Russian scientist, director of the Nuclear Fusion Institute at Kurchatov Institute, and academician (since 2003) of the Russian Academy of Sciences.

== Graduation and awards ==
- 1961: Moscow Institute of Physics and Technology
- 1981: Doctor degree phys.-math science
- 1981: USSR State Prize
- 1997: State Prize of the Russian Federation
- 2002: Jesse W. Beams Research Award
- 2005: Hannes Alfvén Prize of the European Physical Society, together with Malcolm Golby Haines and Thomas Sanford, "for their major contributions to the development of the multi-wire array in Z-pinch pulse-power physics".
