= Chandrashekhar Joshi =

Indian-born American physicist

Chandrashekhar Janardan Joshi
- Born: July 22, 1953 (age 73); Wai, Maharashtra, India
- Education: University of London (B.S.); University of Hull (Ph.D.)
- Awards: John Dawson Award (1996); USPAS Prize (1997); James Clerk Maxwell Prize for Plasma Physics (2006); Hannes Alfvén Prize (2023)
- Scientific career
- Fields: Plasma physics
- Workplaces: UCLA
- Thesis: (1978)
- Doctoral students: Warren B. Mori

Chandrashekhar Janardan Joshi (born July 22, 1953, at Wai, Maharashtra, India) is an Indian–American experimental plasma physicist. He is known for his pioneering work in plasma-based particle acceleration techniques for which he won the 2006 James Clerk Maxwell Prize for Plasma Physics and the 2023 Hannes Alfvén Prize (with Pisin Chen and James Rosenzweig).

Joshi was elected a member of the National Academy of Engineering in 2014 for contributions to development of laser- and beam-driven plasma accelerators. He is currently Distinguished Professor of Electrical Engineering, the director of the Center for High Frequency Electronics and the head of the Neptune Laboratory for Advanced Accelerator Research at UCLA.

== Early life and education ==
Joshi had his primary education at Dravid High school, Wai. While in 9th grade, he was selected by 'Pestalozzi Children's village Trust' in England and went to England for his further studies.

He received his B.Sc. (1974) in nuclear engineering from the University of London and Ph.D. (1978) in applied physics from the University of Hull, which are both in the United Kingdom. Following a two-year stint as a research associate at the National Research Council of Canada, where he worked on laser-plasma interactions, he joined UCLA first as a researcher and became a faculty member since 1988.

== Scientific contributions ==
At UCLA, Joshi has built a strong research group that has done pioneering work in the areas of laser-plasma instabilities, plasma-based light sources, laser fusion and basic plasma experiments. Joshi has made many fundamental contributions to the understanding of extremely nonlinear optical effects in plasmas. Most notable including his first experimental demonstration of four-wave mixing, stimulated Raman forward instability, resonant self-focusing, frequency upshifting by ionization fronts and nonlinear coupling between electron-plasma waves. His group is best known, however, for developing the field of plasma-based particle accelerators over the past three decades.

== Honors and awards ==
Joshi is a Fellow of the APS, IEEE and UK Institute of Physics. He is also the recipient of the 1996 John Dawson Award for Excellence in Plasma Physics Research (jointly awarded with Christopher E. Clayton) as well as the 1997 USPAS Prize for Achievement in Accelerator Physics and Technology. He was the APS Centennial Speaker (1999) and a Distinguished Lecturer in Plasma Physics (2001). He was elected to the National Academy of Engineering in 2014.

=== Citations ===
- John Dawson Award for Excellence in Plasma Physics Research (1996): "For their pioneering experiments in Plasma Based Accelerator Concepts; particularly for their unambiguous experimental demonstration that electrons can be accelerated to relativistic energies by the beating of two laser beams in a plasma with their frequency difference equal to the plasma frequency."
- USPAS Prize for Achievement in Accelerator Physics and Technology (1997): "For pioneering experiments on high gradient, laser-driven, plasma beat-wave acceleration."
- James Clerk Maxwell Prize for Plasma Physics (2006): "For his insight and leadership in applying plasma concepts to high energy electron and positron acceleration, and for his creative exploration of related aspects of plasma physics."
- Hannes Alfvén Prize (2023, with Pisin Chen and James Rosenzweig): "For proposing, demonstrating and conducting impressive ground-breaking experiments on plasma wakefield accelerators driven by particle beams, thus firmly establishing the new concept of plasma acceleration and their applications in the scientific community."

== Publications ==
- Joshi, C. (2006). "Plasma Accelerators". Sci Am. 294 (2): 40–47. Bibcode:2006SciAm.294b..40J. doi:10.1038/scientificamerican0206-40. PMID 16478025.
- Joshi, C; Katsouleas, T. (2003). "Plasma accelerators at the energy frontier and on tabletops". Physics Today. 56 (6): 47–51. Bibcode:2003PhT....56f..47J. doi:10.1063/1.1595054.
- Joshi, C. & Malka, V. (2010). "Focus on Laser- and Beam-Driven Plasma Accelerators". New Journal of Physics. 12 (4) 045003. doi:10.1088/1367-2630/12/4/045003.
- Joshi, C.; Mori, W. B.; Katsouleas, T.; Dawson, J. M.; Kindel, J. M.; Forslund, D. W. (1984). "Ultrahigh gradient particle acceleration by intense laser-driven plasma density waves". Nature. 311 (5986): 525–529. Bibcode:1984Natur.311..525J. doi:10.1038/311525a0. S2CID 4361301.
- M. Litos; et al. (November 5, 2014). "High-efficiency acceleration of an electron beam in a plasma wakefield accelerator". Nature. 515 (7525): 92–95. Bibcode:2014Natur.515...92L. doi:10.1038/nature13882. OSTI 1463003. PMID 25373678. S2CID 4469182.
- Blumenfeld, I.; et al. (2007). "Energy doubling of 42 GeV electrons in a metre-scale plasma wakefield accelerator". Nature. 445 (7129): 741–744. Bibcode:2007Natur.445..741B. doi:10.1038/nature05538. PMID 17301787. S2CID 4334568.
