= Runaway electrons =

Electrons that undergo free fall acceleration into the realm of relativistic particles

The term runaway electrons (RE) is used to denote electrons that undergo free fall acceleration into the realm of relativistic particles. REs may be classified as thermal (lower energy) or relativistic. The study of runaway electrons is thought to be fundamental to our understanding of High-Energy Atmospheric Physics. They are also seen in tokamak fusion devices, where they can damage the reactors.

== Lightning ==
Runaway electrons are the core element of the runaway breakdown based theory of lightning propagation. Since C.T.R. Wilson's work in 1925, research has been conducted to study the possibility of runaway electrons, cosmic ray based or otherwise, initiating the processes required to generate lightning.

== Extraterrestrial Occurrence ==
Electron runaway based lightning may be occurring on the four giant planets in addition to Earth. Simulated studies predict runaway breakdown processes are likely to occur on these gaseous planets far more easily on earth, as the threshold for runaway breakdown to begin is far smaller.

== High Energy Plasma ==
The runaway electron phenomenon has been observed in high energy plasmas. They can pose a threat to machines and experiments in which these plasmas exist, including ITER. Several studies exist examining the properties of runaway electrons in these environments (tokamak), searching to better suppress the detrimental effects of these unwanted runaway electrons. Recent measurements reveal higher-than-expected impurity ion diffusion in runaway electron plateaus, possibly due to turbulence. The choice between low and high atomic number (Z) gas injections for disruption mitigation techniques requires a better understanding of the impurity ion transport, as these ions may not completely mix at impact, affecting the prevention of runaway electron wall damage in large tokamak concepts, like ITER.

=== Runaway electron generation in tokamaks ===
Acceleration of electrons to relativistic velocities occurs when the accelerating force of electric fields is stronger than the braking force from collisions with other particles in the plasma. The friction force electrons feels increases monotonically with momentum until the thermal momentum $p_\text{th} = \sqrt{2m_eT_e}$ is reached, after which it decreases to a very small but finite value as $p \to \infty$. Therefore with a sufficiently strong electric field, the accelerating force can be larger than the maximum friction force, leading to the indefinite acceleration of electrons to relativistic velocities.

An electron with velocity $v \gg v_\text{th}$ will runaway if

$$e E_{\parallel} > \frac{e^4 n_e \ln\Lambda}{4 \pi \varepsilon_0^2 m_e v^2} ,$$

where $m_e$ and $n_e$ are the electron mass and number density respectively, $e$ the elementary charge and $\ln \Lambda$ the Coulomb logarithm. Since the electron velocity is limited by the speed of light $c$, the critical value of the electric field, below which no electrons will runaway, as derived by Connor and Hastie is

$$E_c = \frac{e^3 n_e \ln\Lambda}{4 \pi \varepsilon_0^2 m_e c^2} .$$

There are two different types of runaway generation mechanisms: primary generation or seed generation that does not rely on the existence of runaway electrons, and secondary generation or avalanche multiplication which amplifies the existing runaway population.

An example of primary generation is the Dreicer mechanism, where the collisional diffusion process strives to maintain the electron distribution in thermal equilibrium, therefore filling any "gaps" left by runaway electrons.

The vast majority of runaway electrons are however generated by secondary mechanisms. Knock-on collisions can multiply the population of seed runaway electrons generated by primary mechanisms. Furthermore, since the energy of runaway electrons is far higher than the ionization energy of ions in the plasma, bound electrons may also contribute to the avalanche process.

== Computer and Numerical Simulations ==
This highly complex phenomenon has proved difficult to model with traditional systems, but has been modelled in part with the world's most powerful supercomputer. In addition, aspects of electron runaway have been simulated using the popular particle physics modelling module Geant4.

== Space Based Experiments ==
- TARANIS (CNES)
- ASIM (ESA)
