= Plasma confinement =

Plasma control

In plasma physics, plasma confinement refers to the restriction of energy and particle transport from a plasma in order to maintain its temperature and density for a finite time. The two principal approaches to confinement are magnetic confinement, in which electromagnetic fields are used to contain and control the plasma, and inertial confinement, in which rapid compression of a fuel target confines the plasma for a brief duration through its own inertia.
