= Missing scientists conspiracy theory =

2026 conspiracy theory

In 2026, a conspiracy theory emerged alleging that the deaths or disappearances of several people, some described online as scientists tied to classified or sensitive research, were connected to secret knowledge about UFOs, advanced energy projects, materials science, or related subjects. Speculation started spreading through social media following the February 2026 disappearance of retired U.S. Air Force Major General William Neil McCasland. It then began drawing wider media attention and comment from U.S. federal officials, including the FBI and Donald Trump. Cases cited by proponents span several years and involve unrelated circumstances, including natural death, homicide, suicide, and missing-person reports.

Colleagues of those named, as well as experts and journalists, have rejected claims of a coordinated pattern. Medical sociologist Robert Bartholomew described the belief as an example of apophenia, or the tendency to perceive meaningful links in unrelated events. Multiple family members of those connected to the conspiracy theory have expressed anguish or grief at having their deceased relatives connected to what they have characterized as an absurdity.

The FBI is investigating the missing scientists theory under a federal investigation. The House Oversight Committee is looking for information on the theory from various federal agencies. FBI director Kash Patel said, "If there's any connections that lead to nefarious conduct or conspiracy, this FBI will make the appropriate arrest."

== Origins and propagation ==
"Missing scientists" is a conspiracy theory that originated and grew in popularity in early 2026 and is also being investigated by the FBI. It alleges that ten or eleven unconnected persons who had either died of natural causes, been victims of homicide or suicide, or been reported missing, some of whom were characterized as "scientists" working on classified programs, had been murdered due to their supposed knowledge of UFOs, energy projects, materials science or similarly sensitive fields. The murderers have been suggested to be enemies of the U.S. The deaths and disappearances spanned a period of four years, though in some cases were erroneously reported to have been clustered over a period of a few months. Many were first reported on individually, sometimes from a conspiratorial angle.

=== Inception ===
The origin of the conspiracy theory has been dated to the early 2026 disappearance of William Neil McCasland. McCasland, a 68-year-old retired U.S. Air Force Major General and seventh Commander of Air Force Research Laboratory was reported missing by his wife on February 27, 2026. He had been briefly involved with To The Stars Inc. which, according to Scientific American, is "a celebrity-led organization that promotes theories about aliens". According to CNN, he "played a central role in the U.S. military’s real investigations into mysterious objects in the sky – from Cold War-era research programs to efforts to study UAPs." In regards to speculation his disappearance was related to secret knowledge he possessed about UFOs, McCasland's wife stated that he "had only very commonly held [security] clearances" since his retirement more than a decade before, and suffered from a chronic health issue at the time of his disappearance.

According to the sheriff of Bernalillo County, New Mexico, where McCasland resided, there was "no evidence indicating foul play" in his disappearance. A Silver Alert was issued "based on information available early in the investigation that indicated Mr. McCasland could be at some level of risk and that additional public assistance was needed to locate him." McCasland's wife, Susan McCasland Wilkerson, wrote on Facebook on March 6, 2026 that since his retirement 13 years prior, McCasland "has had only very commonly held clearances" and that "it seems quite unlikely that he was taken to extract very dated secrets from him", also noting he had only "a brief association with the UFO community" when he worked as a consultant for a fiction book.

=== Spread ===
Writing on social media, Michael Shermer, the editor-in-chief of Skeptic, explained that conspiracy theorists began "digging around to find anyone who died for any reason, or has disappeared, then scrapping [sic] through their bio to see if they have any connection whatsoever to UFOs, military, defense, space, aerospace, propulsion etc.", inevitably discovering "patterns in random noise". That explanation was echoed by writer Benjamin Radford who characterized the conspiracy theory as "mystery-mongering data mining".

Attention on the matter was accelerated by U.S. Representative Eric Burlison, a first-term congressman from Missouri who, according to the Kansas City Star, "built a reputation" through his "focus on aliens ... [and] what used to be called UFOs". By March 2026, the unrelated deaths and the conspiracy theory that connected them had gained wider public attention due to reporting by News Nation, the New York Post, the Daily Mail, and political commentator Tim Pool's podcast. Fox News' The Will Cain Show covered it on April 2, and a Fox News reporter asked White House press secretary Karoline Leavitt about it during a briefing on April 15. She then posted that "the White House is actively working with all relevant agencies and the FBI to holistically review all of the cases together and identify any potential commonalities that may exist."

According to The Atlantic, names added to the list included an advanced-materials researcher at NASA's Jet Propulsion Laboratory who had disappeared while hiking, a Los Alamos National Laboratory administrative assistant who went missing, and a person who claimed that her father, a former NASA propulsion engineer, had discovered the secret of anti-gravity. Joseph Uscinski, political scientist, said that "Your average conspiracy theory, someone comes up with it and it dies on the vine, ... What makes this unique is you have government agents, with guns, investigating this."

== Persons described as missing ==
The following people are commonly cited as involved in the scenario and are being investigated by the FBI. In addition to the names listed, U.S. representative Tim Burchett stated he did not think the death of David Wilcock—a New Age conspiracy theorist who died by suicide in the presence of law enforcement officers on April 20, 2026, after a long battle with depression and extreme financial difficulty—is "a coincidence".

Persons commonly cited as missing or deceased
Person	Age	Biography	Status/cause of death	Date	Resolution	References
Ning Li	78	University of Alabama physicist, founder of AC Gravity, anti-gravity scientist	Deceased (Alzheimer's disease)	2021-07-27		
Amy Eskridge	34		Deceased (suicide)	2022-06-11	Eskridge's death was investigated by Birmingham, Alabama, police and ruled a suicide. A postmortem statement released by family noted she had suffered ongoing pain and that they did not find her death unusual.	
Michel David Hicks	59	Former planetary scientist at the Jet Propulsion Laboratory	Deceased (heart disease)	2023-07-30	Hicks' official cause of death was not released at the wishes of the family; a daughter stated he suffered from an unspecified chronic medical condition at the time of his passing, later revealed to be heart disease.	
Matthew Sullivan	39	U.S. Air Force	Deceased (suicide)	2024-05-12		
Frank Maiwald	61	Surface Water and Ocean Topography and imaging spectroscopy engineer at the Jet Propulsion Laboratory	Deceased	2024-07-04	Maiwald's obituary stated that he "passed away", at age 61 without listing a cause of death.	
Anthony Chavez	78	Retired construction foreman who once worked at Los Alamos National Laboratory	Disappeared	2025-05-08	Missing	
Monica Jacinto Reza	60	Metallurgist and materials engineer at the Jet Propulsion Laboratory	Disappeared	2025-06-22	Reza disappeared while hiking in the Angeles National Forest with friends who lost her while navigating a trail on a cliff's edge.	
Melissa Casias	53	Administrative assistant at Los Alamos National Laboratory	Deceased	2025-06-26	Last seen walking along a state highway; relatives report she was experiencing a "huge amount of stress" related to financial issues and said she probably decided to run away. Asked if she left of "her own volition", a spokesman for the New Mexico State Police stated "it appears this may be the case". Her remains were discovered in Carson National Forest and identified on May 31, 2026. A handgun was also found near the body.	
Steven Garcia	47	Contract property custodian at the Kansas City National Security Campus	Disappeared	2025-08-28	Missing	
Jason Thomas	45	Assistant director of chemical biology at Novartis	Deceased (drowning)	2025-12-12	Thomas drowned at Lake Quannapowitt. The Middlesex County, Massachusetts medical examiner stated no foul play was involved, and Thomas' wife noted he was depressed at the time of his death.	
Nuno Loureiro	47	Plasma physicist; professor and leader of MIT Plasma Science and Fusion Center	Deceased (homicide)	2025-12-16	Loureiro was a victim of the 2025 Brown University shooting perpetrated by Cláudio Manuel Neves Valente.	
Carl Grillmair	67	Retired Caltech astronomer and astrophysicist of exoplanets, galactic structure, and dark matter	Deceased (homicide)	2026-02-16	Grillmair was murdered in a carjacking. A 29-year-old California man was charged with the homicide in February 2026.	
Joshua LeBlanc	29	Nuclear engineer at NASA Marshall Space Flight Center	Deceased (traffic collision)	2025-07-22	Died in an automobile accident outside of Huntsville, Alabama.	
William Neil McCasland	68	Retired U.S. Air Force Major General, former commander Air Force Research Laboratory	Disappeared	2026-02-27	Missing	
Nick Pope	60	English UFO investigator, author, media commentator and civil servant	Deceased (Esophageal cancer)	2026-04-06	Died at home from esophageal cancer	

== Opinions and reactions ==
Public reactions ranged from official expressions of concern to outright skepticism. While federal officials said the cases merited review, relatives, colleagues, and outside commentators said the deaths and disappearances involved varied circumstances and did not support claims of a single coordinated plot.

=== Official statements ===
The FBI said in April that it "is spearheading the effort to look for connections into the missing and deceased scientists". The United States House Committee on Oversight and Government Reform said it will investigate reports on the dead and missing individuals. House Oversight Chair James Comer stated that the deaths or disappearances are unlikely to be a coincidence, and U.S. president Donald Trump called it "pretty serious stuff", but hopefully coincidental. White House press secretary Karoline Leavitt stated at an April 15 briefing that "the White House is actively working with all relevant agencies and the FBI to holistically review all of the cases together and identify any potential commonalities that may exist."

In late April, a spokesperson for NASA, where several of the so-called "missing scientists" once worked, stated that "nothing related to NASA indicates a national security threat". The National Nuclear Security Administration (NNSA) stated that it is "paying attention". On April 29, 2026, the FBI and the United States Attorney for the District of Massachusetts announced that they had conclusively determined, with the assistance of the Providence Police and Rhode Island State Police, that Portuguese national Claudio Manuel Neves Valente was solely responsible for the murder of Nuno Loureiro, that Loureiro's murder had "no nexus to terrorism", and that Valente's actions were probably due to personal dissatisfaction with his social and professional life.

==== Elected officeholders ====
United States representative James Walkinshaw, a member of the Committee on Homeland Security, said of the missing people, "The United States has thousands of nuclear scientists and nuclear experts. It’s not the kind of nuclear program that potentially a foreign adversary could significantly impact by targeting 10 individuals." Representative Eric Burlison said that he had requested FBI involvement on the matter.

=== Family and colleagues ===
Family members of some of those named by conspiracy theorists as among the disappeared scientists expressed confusion or discomfort at having their relatives connected to the conspiracy theory. The daughter of Hicks explained Hicks suffered from known medical issues at the time of his death and that there was "no train of logic to follow that would implicate him" in the conspiracy theory, going on to say she could not "help but laugh about it". Hicks' brother expressed anguish at his connection to the conspiracy theory, stating "he's had great scientific achievements and contributions to the field, and now he's going to be remembered for some baloney, Loch Ness Monster, Bigfoot conspiracy theory."

In a public statement, Eskridge's family explained she suffered from "chronic pain" at the time of her suicide and declined to characterize her death as unusual. Grillmair's widow stated she thought the conspiracy theory was "absolute nonsense" and said her husband "would laugh" at those propagating it were he alive. Casias' family reiterated their previous statement, which was supported by the New Mexico State Police, that Casias ran away of her own volition due to stress. Colleagues of the "missing scientists" have also rejected the idea of conspiracy. Joe Masiero, a planetary scientist at Caltech who worked with two of the now deceased researchers, said he had no reason to believe any of the cases were connected, and that it was "really unfortunate to see a tragedy played out over and over again" by propagators of the conspiracy theory.

Nick Pope's wife, anthropologist Dr. Elizabeth Weiss, said, “The conspiracy theory turns our — mine and Nick’s — painful journey into a farce. To believe the conspiracy theory, you would have to believe the government planted a cancer gene that would lead him to have cancer when he was 59 years old; or that the doctors would be in on it; or that the various tests — from M.R.I.s to blood work — would be faked.”

=== Media ===
Journalist Mike Rothschild decried what he described as "family trauma that’s essentially being monetized for clicks" by conspiracy theorists. He compared it to conspiracy theories like Tutankhamun's curse, murdered witnesses to the JFK assassination and the Clinton body count. According to science writer Mick West, more than 700,000 people work in top-secret-cleared positions in the U.S. aerospace and nuclear sectors. When viewed against existing mortality rates and causes, this would suggest around 250 persons in the industry would normally succumb to homicides and suicides over the time-period during which the 10 or 11 alleged "missing scientists" had died or disappeared, with thousands more dying of natural causes.

Writing at UnHerd in April 2026, political scientist Richard Hanania opined there was "nothing to indicate that the events that have been linked together ... have any connection to one another" and questioned the idea that some of the alleged deaths or disappearances were of people that could legitimately be classified as scientists in the first place. CBS News said that neither they or several experts they interviewed found any obvious links between the cases. The Los Angeles Times saw no obvious evidence in April that the cases were connected, and The Times agreed. Several experts interviewed by The Boston Globe had "strong doubts" that there was a conspiracy involved. Snopes called the idea of a conspiracy targeting the "missing scientists" purely conjecture.

== Psychology of missing scientists belief ==
According to medical sociologist Robert Bartholomew, who specializes in the study of social hysteria and UFO conspiracy thinking, belief in the missing scientists conspiracy theory "underscores the human tendency to see what we expect to see". Bartholomew described the belief in the interconnectedness of disconnected events as a case of apophenia or "the tendency to see meaningful links in unrelated events". He said that "social media postings plant the idea that there has been a coordinated attack on American scientists ... [priming some] to reinterpret random deaths and disappearances as suspicious and sinister".

== See also ==
- Disclosure movement
- The Ipcress File (film)
