= C band (IEEE) =

Range of radio frequencies from 4 to 8 GHz

IEEE C band
- Frequency range: 4–8 GHz
- Wavelength range: 7.5–3.75 cm
- Related bands: G / H bands (NATO); SHF (ITU)

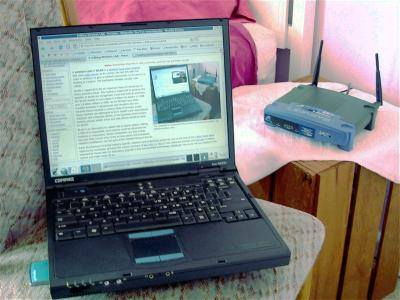
The C band is used by 5 GHz Wi-fi networks, for example to connect laptops (left) to the internet through a wireless router (right)

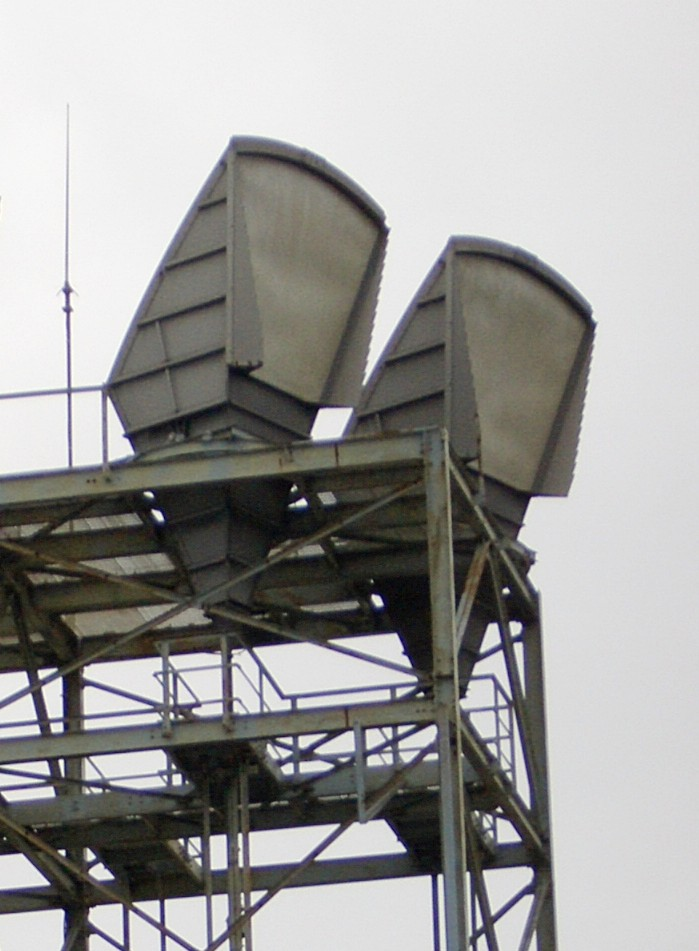
C-band horn antennas of this type became widespread in the United States in the 1950s for terrestrial microwave relay networks.

The C band is a designation by the Institute of Electrical and Electronics Engineers (IEEE) for a portion of the electromagnetic spectrum in the microwave range of frequencies ranging from 4.0 to 8.0 gigahertz (GHz). However, the U.S. Federal Communications Commission C band proceeding and auction, designated 3.7–4.2 GHz as C band. The C band is used for many satellite communications transmissions, some cordless telephones, as well as some radar and weather radar systems.

The C band contains the 5.725 - 5.875 GHz ISM band allowing unlicensed use by low power devices, such as garage door openers, wireless doorbells, and baby monitors. A very large use is by the high frequency (5.2 GHz) band of Wi-Fi (IEEE 802.11a) wireless computer networks. These are the most widely used computer networks in the world, used to allow laptops, smartphones, printers and TVs to connect to the internet through a wireless router in home and small office networks, and access points in hotels, libraries, and coffee shops.

== Use in satellite communication ==
The communications C band was the first frequency band that was allocated for commercial telecommunications via satellites. The same frequencies were already in use for terrestrial microwave radio relay chains. Nearly all C-band communication satellites use the band of frequencies from 3.7 to 4.2 GHz for their downlinks, and the band of frequencies from 5.925 to 6.425 GHz for their uplinks. Note that by using the band from 3.7 to 4.0 GHz, this C band overlaps somewhat with the IEEE S band for radars.

The C-band communication satellites typically have 24 radio transponders spaced 20 MHz apart, but with the adjacent transponders on opposite polarizations such that transponders on the same polarization are always 40 MHz apart. Of this 40 MHz, each transponder utilizes about 36 MHz. The unused 4.0 MHz between the pairs of transponders act as guard bands for the likely case of imperfections in the microwave electronics.

One use of the C band is for satellite communication, whether for full-time satellite television networks or raw satellite feeds, although subscription programming also exists. This use contrasts with direct-broadcast satellite, which is a completely closed system used to deliver subscription programming to small satellite dishes that are connected with proprietary receiving equipment.

The satellite communications portion of the C band is highly associated with television receive-only satellite reception systems, commonly called "big dish" systems, since small receiving antennas are not optimal for C band. Typical antenna sizes on C-band-capable systems range from 6 to 12 feet (1.8 to 3.5 meters) on consumer satellite dishes, although larger ones also can be used. For satellite communications, the microwave frequencies of the C band perform better under adverse weather conditions in comparison with the K_{u} band (11.2–14.5 GHz), microwave frequencies used by other communication satellites. Rain fade – the collective name for the negative effects of adverse weather conditions on transmission – is mostly a consequence of precipitation and moisture in the air.

=== Other uses of C-band frequencies ===
The C band also includes the 5.8 GHz ISM band between 5.725 and 5.875 GHz, which is used for medical and industrial heating applications and many unlicensed short-range microwave communication systems, such as cordless phones, baby monitors, and keyless entry systems for vehicles. The C-band frequencies of 5.4 GHz band [5.15 to 5.35 GHz, 5.47 to 5.725 GHz, or 5.725 to 5.875 GHz, depending on the region of the world] are used for Wi-Fi wireless computer networks in the 5 GHz spectrum.

== C-Band Alliance ==
The C-Band Alliance was an industry consortium of four large communications satellite operators in 2018–2020.

In response to a Notice of Proposed Rulemaking of July 2018 from the US Federal Communications Commission (FCC) to make the 3.7 to 4.2 GHz spectrum available for next-generation terrestrial fixed and mobile broadband services, the C-Band Alliance (CBA) was established in September 2018 by the four satellite operators—Intelsat, SES, Eutelsat and Telesat—that provide the majority of C-band satellite services in the US, including media distribution reaching 100 million US households. The consortium made a proposal to the FCC to act as a facilitator for the clearing and repurposing of a 200 MHz portion of C-band spectrum to accelerate the deployment of next generation 5G services, while protecting incumbent users and their content distribution and data networks in the US from potential interference.

The C-Band Alliance lobbied for a private sale, but the FCC and some members of Congress wanted an auction. In November 2019, the FCC announced that an auction was planned, which took place in December 2020. Cable operators wanted to be compensated for the loss of 200 MHz, which would not include a guard band of 20 MHz to prevent interference.

By late 2019, the commercial alliance had weakened. Eutelsat formally pulled out of the consortium in September 2019 over internal disagreements. By February 2020, it became even less of a factor in C-band spectrum reallocation as Intelsat pulled out of the alliance and communicated to the FCC that the C-Band Alliance was dead. Among other claims, Intelsat argued that it was obvious that the FCC was already treating each satellite operator individually and that it therefore made business sense for each company to respond to the FCC from its own commercial perspective.

One of the major members of the C-Band Alliance, Intelsat, filed for bankruptcy on 14 May 2020, just before the new 5G spectrum auctions were to take place, with over US$15 billion in total debt. Public information showed that the company had been considering bankruptcy protection from at least as early as February 2020.

== Differences in frequency range by geographic area ==
Slight variations in the assignments of C-band frequencies have been approved for use in various parts of the world, depending on their locations in the three ITU radio regions. Note that one region includes all of Europe and Africa, plus all of Russia; a second includes all of the Americas, and the third region includes all of Asia outside of Russia, plus Australia and New Zealand. This latter region is the most populous one, since it includes China, India, Pakistan, Japan, and Southeast Asia.

C-band variations around the world
Band	Transmit frequency (GHz)	Receive frequency (GHz)
Standard C band	5.850–6.425	3.625–4.200
Super extended C band	6.425–6.725	3.400–3.625
INSAT / ITU Appendix 30B	6.725–7.025	4.500–4.800
Russian C band	5.975–6.475	3.650–4.150
LMI C band	5.725–6.025	3.700–4.000

== Amateur radio ==
The Radio Regulations of the International Telecommunication Union allow amateur radio operations in the frequency range 5.650 to 5.925 GHz, and amateur satellite operations are allowed in the ranges 5.830 to 5.850 GHz for down-links and 5.650 to 5.670 GHz for up-links. This is known as the 5-centimeter band by amateurs and the C band by AMSAT.

== Particle accelerators ==
Particle accelerators may be powered by C-band RF sources. The frequencies are then standardized at 5.996 GHz (Europe) or 5.712 GHz (US), which is the second harmonic of S band.

== Nuclear fusion experiments ==
Several tokamak fusion reactors use high-power C-band RF sources to sustain the toroidal plasma current. Common frequencies include 3.7 GHz (Joint European Torus, WEST (formerly Tore Supra)), 4.6 GHz (Alcator C, Alcator C-Mod, EAST, DIII-D), 5 GHz (KSTAR, ITER) and 8 GHz (Frascati Tokamak Upgrade).

== Aeronautical radionavigation service ==
The band 4.2–4.4 GHz is currently allocated to the aeronautical radionavigation service (ARNS) on a primary worldwide basis. RR No. 5.438 notes specifically that this band is reserved exclusively for radar altimeter installed on board aircraft and for the associated transponders on the ground.

== Cellular telephony ==
In February 2020, the U.S. Federal Communications Commission adopted rules for the C band at 3.7–4.2 GHz that allocated the lower 280 megahertz of the band, at 3.7–3.98 GHz, for terrestrial wireless use. Existing satellite operators had to repack their operations into the upper 200 megahertz of the band, from 4.0 to 4.2 GHz, and there is a 20-megahertz guard band at 3.98–4.0 GHz.

Licenses to use the 3.7–3.98 GHz band were auctioned in December 2020. Verizon, AT&T and T-Mobile are main winners of the auction. Verizon, AT&T, and T-Mobile spent approximately $45 billion, $23 billion, and $9 billion respectively during the auction.

In December 2021, Boeing and Airbus called on the US government to delay the rollout of new 5G phone service that uses C band due to concern of the interference with some sensitive aircraft instruments, especially radio altimeters operating at 4.2–4.4 GHz. On January 18, 2022, Verizon and AT&T announced that they would delay their C-band 5G rollout near airports in response to those concerns.
