= Riconda =

Riconda is an Italian surname. Notable people with the surname include:

- Caterina Riconda, Italian physicist
- Harry Riconda (1897–1958), American baseball player
