= Bill Dorland =

American plasma physicist (1965–2024)

- Born: William Douglass Dorland; 1965
- Died: September 22, 2024 (aged 58–59)
- Education: University of Texas at Austin; Princeton University
- Awards: Ernest Orlando Lawrence Award (2009); James Clerk Maxwell Prize for Plasma Physics (2024)
- Scientific career
- Fields: Computational plasma physics
- Workplaces: University of Texas at Austin; Imperial College; University of Maryland, College Park
- Thesis: Gyrofluid models of plasma turbulence (1993)
- Doctoral advisor: Greg Hammett
- Website: sites.google.com/view/bdorland/home

William Douglass Dorland (1965 — September 22, 2024) was an American computational plasma physicist, who was a professor at Department of Physics at University of Maryland, College Park. Best known for his contributions to the theory and computation of plasma turbulence and magnetized plasmas, he received the James Clerk Maxwell Prize for Plasma Physics in 2024 alongside his doctoral advisor, Greg Hammett.

== Biography ==
Completing his undergraduate studies at the University of Texas at Austin in 1988, Dorland received his master’s degree in public affairs and doctoral degree in astrophysical sciences from Princeton University in 1993. Following a post-doctoral appointment at the Institute for Fusion Studies at University of Texas, he joined University of Maryland in 1998. Having held appointments in Imperial College, University of Vienna and University of Oxford, he served as the associate laboratory director for Computational Science at the Princeton Plasma Physics Laboratory from 2020 to 2023. He has also served as the University of Maryland Honors College, as well as the co-editor of the journal, Journal of Plasma Physics.

Dorland was elected as a Fellow of the American Physical Society's Plasma Physics in 2005 and held University of Maryland's Richard A. Ferrell Distinguished Faculty Fellowship in 2008. He received Ernest Orlando Lawrence Award in 2009 and in 2024, was awarded James Clerk Maxwell Prize for Plasma Physics "for studies of resonant and non-resonant energetic particle transport in magnetized plasmas, innovative diagnostic methods, and the experimental discovery of detrimental fast-ion driven instabilities," alongside his doctoral advisor G. W. Hammett.

Diagnosed with chordoma in 2004, Dorland served as an advocate for the chordoma patient community and was one of the founders of the Chordoma Foundation. He died from the complications of the disease on September 22, 2024, shortly after receiving the James Clerk Maxwell Prize. He was survived by his wife, University of Maryland geology professor Sarah C. Penniston-Dorland, and her daughter.

== Selected publications ==
Journal articles

- Waltz, R. E.; Staebler, G. M.; Dorland, W.; Hammett, G. W.; Kotschenreuther, M.; Konings, J. A. (1997). "A gyro-Landau-fluid transport model". Physics of Plasmas. 4: 2482–2496. doi:10.1063/1.872228.
- Dimits, A. M.; Bateman, G.; Beer, M. A.; Cohen, B. I.; Dorland, W.; Hammett, G. W.; Kim, C.; Kinsey, J. E.; Kotschenreuther, M.; Kritz, A. H.; Lao, L. L.; Mandrekas, J.; Nevins, W. M.; Parker, S. E.; Redd, A. J.; Shumaker, D. E.; Sydora, R.; Weiland, J. (2000). "Comparisons and physics basis of tokamak transport models and turbulence simulations". Physics of Plasmas. 7: 969–983. doi:10.1063/1.873896.
- Jenko, F.; Dorland, W.; Kotschenreuther, M.; Rogers, B. N. (2000). "Electron temperature gradient driven turbulence". Physics of Plasmas. 7: 1904–1910. doi:10.1063/1.874014.
- Dorland, W.; Jenko, F.; Kotschenreuther, M.; Rogers, B. N. (2000). "Electron temperature gradient turbulence". Physical Review Letters. 85 (5579). doi:10.1103/PhysRevLett.85.5579.
- Schekochihin, A. A.; Cowley, S. C.; Dorland, W.; Hammett, G. W.; Howes, G. G.; Quataert, E.; Tatsuno, T. (2009). "Astrophysical gyrokinetics: Kinetic and fluid turbulent cascades in magnetized weakly collisional plasmas". The Astrophysical Journal Supplement Series. 182 (1): 310. arXiv:0704.0044. doi:10.1088/0067-0049/182/1/310.
