= Greg Hammett =

American plasma physicist

- Born: Gregory Wayne Hammett
- Education: Harvard University; Princeton University
- Known for: Contributions to plasma turbulance
- Awards: James Clerk Maxwell Prize for Plasma Physics (2024)
- Scientific career
- Fields: Computational plasma physics
- Workplaces: Princeton University; Princeton Plasma Physics Laboratory
- Thesis: Fast ion studies of ion cyclotron heating in the PLT tokamak (1986)
- Doctoral advisor: Robert Kaita
- Doctoral students: Bill Dorland; Emily Belli
- Website: w3.pppl.gov/~hammett

Gregory Wayne Hammett is an American plasma physicist, who is a professor at the Department of Astrophysical Sciences at Princeton University and a principal research scientist at the Princeton Plasma Physics Laboratory. Known for his computational and theoretical studies on plasma turbulence, he received the James Clerk Maxwell Prize for Plasma Physics alongside his former doctoral student Bill Dorland in 2024 "for pioneering work in kinetic plasma turbulence that revolutionizes turbulent transport calculations for magnetic confinement devices and inspires research in astrophysical plasma turbulence."

Hammett received B.A. degree in physics from Harvard University and Ph.D. in astrophysical sciences from Princeton University in 1980 and 1986, respectively. He was elected as a fellow of the American Physical Society in 1997. He has been a lecturer with the rank of professor in the Princeton Program in Plasma Physics since 2001 and has been an associate faculty member with the Program in Applied & Computational Mathematics. In 2021, he was named as a Distinguished Scientist Fellow by the United States Department of Energy for his research on plasma turbulence in fusion and astrophysics.

== Selected publications ==
Journal articles

- Hammett, Gregory W.; Perkins, Francis W. (1990). "Fluid moment models for Landau damping with application to the ion-temperature-gradient instability". Physical Review Letters. 64 (25): 3019–3022. doi:10.1103/PhysRevLett.64.3019.
- Beer, M. A.; Cowley, S. C.; Hammett, G. W. (1995). "Field-aligned coordinates for nonlinear simulations of tokamak turbulence". Physics of Plasmas. 2 (7): 2687–2700. doi:10.1063/1.871232.
- Waltz, R. E.; Staebler, G. M.; Dorland, W.; Hammett, G. W.; Kotschenreuther, M.; Konings, J. A. (1997). "A gyro-Landau-fluid transport model". Physics of Plasmas. 4: 2482–2496. doi:10.1063/1.872228.
- Dimits, A. M.; Bateman, G.; Beer, M. A.; Cohen, B. I.; Dorland, W.; Hammett, G. W.; Kim, C.; Kinsey, J. E.; Kotschenreuther, M.; Kritz, A. H.; Lao, L. L.; Mandrekas, J.; Nevins, W. M.; Parker, S. E.; Redd, A. J.; Shumaker, D. E.; Sydora, R.; Weiland, J. (2000). "Comparisons and physics basis of tokamak transport models and turbulence simulations". Physics of Plasmas. 7: 969–983. doi:10.1063/1.873896.
- Schekochihin, A. A.; Cowley, S. C.; Dorland, W.; Hammett, G. W.; Howes, G. G.; Quataert, E.; Tatsuno, T. (May 2009). "Astrophysical gyrokinetics: Kinetic and fluid turbulent cascades in magnetized weakly collisional plasmas". The Astrophysical Journal Supplement Series. 182 (1): 310–377. arXiv:0704.0044. doi:10.1088/0067-0049/182/1/310.
