= Neil McCasland =

American retired general (born c. 1957)

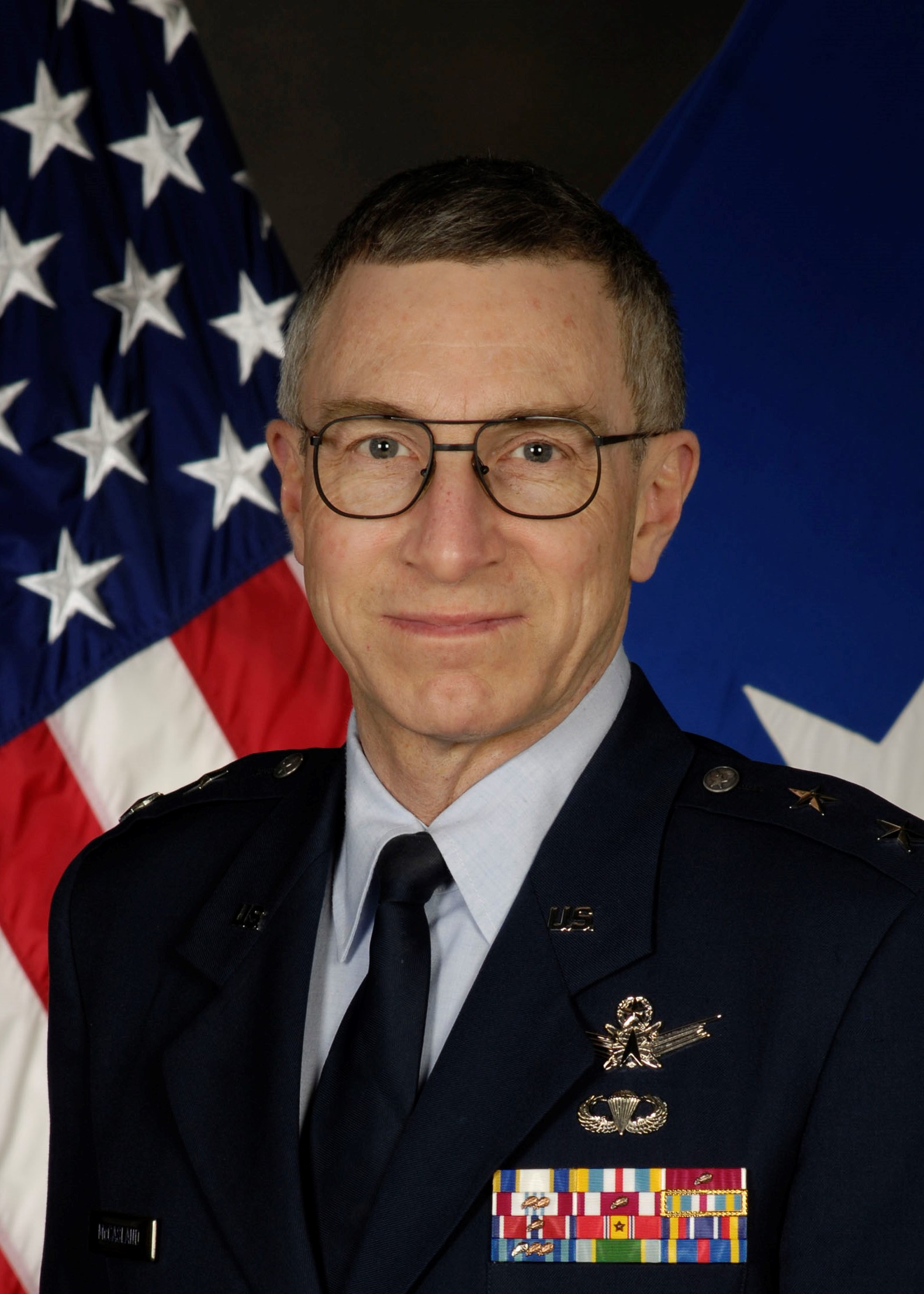
- Official portrait, 2013
- Born: William Neil McCasland c. 1957
- Disappeared: February 27, 2026 (aged 68); Albuquerque, New Mexico, U.S.
- Status: Missing for 8 months and 26 days
- Education: United States Air Force Academy (BS); Massachusetts Institute of Technology (MA, PhD)
- Spouse: Susan Wilkerson
- Military career
- Allegiance: United States
- Branch: United States Air Force
- Service years: 1979–2013
- Rank: Major general
- Commands: • 7th Commander of Air Force Research Laboratory • Director, Special Programs, Office of the Under Secretary of Defense • Director, Space Acquisition, Office of the Under Secretary of the Air Force
- Website: Air Force Biography

William Neil McCasland is an American retired United States Air Force major general and astronautical engineer. He served in several senior military and space acquisition positions, including director of Special Programs in the Office of the Under Secretary of Defense and commander of the Air Force Research Laboratory from 2011 to 2013. He retired from the Air Force in 2013 and later worked in the aerospace and defense industry.

McCasland was reported missing from his home in Albuquerque, New Mexico, on February 27, 2026. His disappearance prompted a search involving local law enforcement and the Federal Bureau of Investigation (FBI). His case also attracted public attention because of his past connections to discussions about unidentified flying objects (UFOs), although claims linking his disappearance to such topics have not been substantiated.

== Early life and education ==
McCasland grew up in an Air Force family, the son of Lieutenant William H. and Robin (née Chambless) McCasland. His father was killed in a flying accident when he was young, and his mother eventually remarried another airman, Lieutenant William R. Casey.

McCasland went on to attend the United States Air Force Academy, graduating with a Bachelor of Science degree in astronautical engineering in 1979. He went on to receive a full scholarship from the Hertz foundation, and attended Massachusetts Institute of Technology for a Master's degree in aeronautical engineering estimation and controls in 1980. He returned to MIT in 1985 to complete a doctorate in astronautical engineering. He defended his dissertation "Sensor and Actuator Selection for Fault-Tolerant Control of Flexible Structures" in August 1988. Dedicated to his late father, McCasland's thesis was supervised by Richard Battin, primary designer of the Apollo program guidance computer.

He later went on to attend the Air War College at Maxwell Air Force Base, Alabama, graduating in 1995, as well as the Advanced Program Manager's Course at the Defense Systems Management College on Fort Belvoir, Virginia. In 2004 he participated in the United States-Russia Security Program at the Kennedy School of Government at Harvard University.

== Military career ==
=== Assignments ===
After graduate school, McCasland served in the Payload Systems Division with the Secretary of the Air Force Office of Special Projects-6 and -8 at Los Angeles Air Force Base, California until 1985, when he returned to MIT to pursue a doctorate degree. After graduation, he returned to Los Angeles AFB as assistant director of the Office of Special Projects-13. As a lieutenant, McCasland reportedly stood out among his peers, becoming one of just a handful of lower officers given large program leadership responsibilities for highly classified development units within what became the birth of Air Force satellite reconnaissance as it exists today.

In 1992, he moved to Buckley Air Force Base, Colorado, serving as director of mission planning for the Aerospace Data Facility through 1994. After a hiatus in 1995 to attend Air War College, he returned to Buckley to command the operations squadron at the ADF through 1997.

After Buckley, he returned to Los Angeles AFB, spending three years as the Chief Engineer of the Navstar GPS Joint Program Office, the controlling authority for the Global Positioning System for government, commercial, and consumer applications. In 2000 he took control of the Space Based Laser Project Office at LA AFB as Systems Program Director, before moving to Kirtland Air Force Base, New Mexico a year later to begin a three-year stint as materiel wing director, Air Force Research Laboratory Space Vehicles Directorate, and commander of the Phillips Research Site. Several of these postings involved close work with the National Reconnaissance Office. In 2004 McCasland became vice commander of the Ogden Air Logistics Center, a facility attached to Hill Air Force Base, Utah, spending a year leading operations before returning yet again to LA AFB as vice commander of the Space and Missile Systems Center.

In 2007, McCasland was assigned to the Pentagon as director of space acquisition within the Office of the Under Secretary of the Air Force. In 2009 he was promoted to director of special programs within the Office of the Under Secretary of Defense for Acquisition, Technology and Logistics. Serving as director of special programs also made McCasland executive secretary for the Special Access Program Oversight Committee (SAPOC), in charge of the oversight and review body with full purview of all of America's most sensitive and secretive knowledge, capabilities, and programs.

In May 2011, McCasland left Washington for his final posting, assuming command of Air Force Research Laboratory at Wright-Patterson Air Force Base, Ohio, a position he held until his retirement in October 2013. At AFRL, he led billions of dollars in advanced materials sciences and future weapons research across one of the largest scientific centers in the Department of Defense.

=== Awards and decorations ===
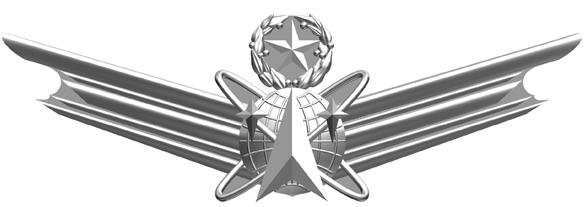
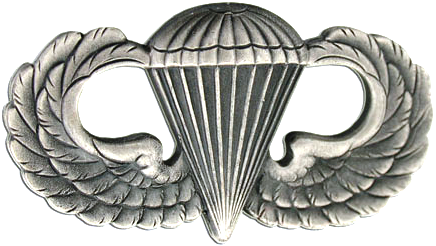

Master Space Operations Badge
Basic Parachutist Badge
Air Force Distinguished Service Medal	Defense Superior Service Medal	Legion of Merit w/ 1 oak leaf cluster
Defense Meritorious Service Medal w/ 2 oak leaf clusters	Meritorious Service Medal w/ oak leaf cluster	Joint Meritorious Unit Award
Air Force Organizational Excellence Award w/ 1 oak leaf cluster	National Defense Service Medal w/ bronze service star	Global War on Terrorism Service Medal
Air Force Longevity Service Award w/ 3 oak leaf clusters	Small Arms Expert Marksmanship Ribbon	Air Force Training Ribbon
Headquarters Air Force badge		Office of the Secretary of Defense Identification Badge

== Post-military career ==
McCasland is currently director of technology at Applied Technology Associates, based in Albuquerque, New Mexico. It is a subsidiary of BlueHalo, headquartered in Arlington, Virginia, a defense conglomerate operating in the areas of space warfare, directed energy, missile defense, cyber and C4ISR.

Since 2013 McCasland has been an associate fellow of the American Institute of Aeronautics and Astronautics.

In June 2019, McCasland joined the board of trustees for Riverside Research, a not-for-profit "chartered to advance scientific research for the benefit of the United States government and in the public interest".

McCasland is a senior member of the Institute of Electrical and Electronics Engineers (IEEE).

== Involvement in unidentified flying object disclosure ==
McCasland's involvement with the topic of unidentified flying objects became public when WikiLeaks released an archive of Hillary Clinton Campaign chairman John Podesta's email records in 2016. The archive of documents was obtained from a data breach by Fancy Bear, a hacking group that the United States Government alleges is associated with military intelligence assets of the Russian Federation.

Podesta's involvement in UFO disclosure initiatives is well documented throughout his service in both the Clinton and Obama administrations, and he was also purportedly involved in the Tom DeLonge-led To The Stars, a nonprofit associated with the UFO disclosure movement. The pair's collaboration on seemingly fringe science led some to speculate that public officials like McCasland were manipulating DeLonge into developing a UFO cover story for new classified American defense technology of a terrestrial origin. McCasland is the subject of an email dated January 25, 2016 from Tom DeLonge to Podesta reportedly leaked on WikiLeaks in which DeLonge says of McCasland:

…I've been working with him for four months. I just got done giving him a four hour presentation on the entire project a few weeks ago. Trust me, the advice is already been happening on how to do all this. He just has to say that out loud, but he is very, very aware- as he was in charge of all of the stuff. When Roswell crashed, they shipped it to the laboratory at Wright Patterson Air Force Base. General McCasland was in charge of that exact laboratory up to a couple years ago. He not only knows what I'm trying to achieve, he helped assemble my advisory team. He's a very important man.

Other speculation focused on a relationship between McCasland and Michael Duggin, an Australian-American scientist with AFRL at Kirtland Air Force Base, New Mexico who spent years of his Air Force career researching UFO phenomena. Duggin was an assistant to J. Allen Hynek, an astronomer who led the Air Force's infamous Project Blue Book, one of the first investigations of reported encounters with UFOs by the United States Government.

== Personal life ==
Early in his Air Force career McCasland married San Diego native Susan Wilkerson. He lives in Albuquerque, New Mexico.

In the 2024 United States presidential election, McCasland endorsed Kamala Harris.

== Disappearance ==
On February 27, 2026, New Mexico's Bernalillo County sheriff's office announced McCasland was missing, issuing a silver alert. It is unknown what he was wearing or where he was heading. On March 1, New Mexico Search and Rescue began assisting with the investigation. On March 6, the FBI got involved in the search. According to Newsweek, McCasland's prescription glasses and "wearable devices" were located at his home, but his hiking boots, wallet, and a .38 caliber revolver were missing.

McCasland's disappearance is a central element in the missing scientists conspiracy theory, which posits that UFOs are related to a number of missing and dead scientists.

As of April 2026, his disappearance is under investigation as part of a White House probe into people with high government clearance and scientists who have died or disappeared in recent years, including Monica Jacinto, a materials engineer at NASA's Jet Propulsion Laboratory, Caltech astronomer Carl Grillmair, and MIT fusion scientist Nuno Loureiro, among others.

State rescue teams planned to search for McCasland on June 26, 2026.

As of November 2026, no updates from the local sheriff's office have confirmed that McCasland has been found.
