= Bruno Coppi =

Italian-American physicist

Bruno Coppi OMRI
- Born: 19 November 1935 (age 90); Gonzaga, Lombardy, Italy
- Education: Polytechnic University of Milan (Ph.D.)
- Awards: James Clerk Maxwell Prize for Plasma Physics (1987); Feltrinelli Prize (2016)
- Scientific career
- Fields: Plasma physics
- Doctoral students: Caterina Riconda; Linda Sugiyama

Bruno Coppi OMRI (born 19 November 1935 in Gonzaga, Lombardy, Italy) is an Italian-American physicist specializing in plasma physics.

In 1959, Coppi attained an Italian doctoral degree at Polytechnic University of Milan and was subsequently a docent and research scientist at the Polytechnic Institute and the University of Milan. In 1961, he was a scientist at the Princeton Plasma Physics Laboratory. From 1964 to 1967, he was an assistant professor at the University of California, San Diego, from 1967 to 1969 at the Institute for Advanced Study, and from 1968 a professor at the Massachusetts Institute of Technology. In the 1980s, Coppi was a member of the science team in the Voyager 2 space probe.

Coppi works on theoretical plasma physics, space plasmas and magnetic fusion. At MIT, he initiated the Alcator Program, which led to the Russian-Italian Ignitor proposal, which aimed at building a high-field breakeven tokamak near Moscow, with Coppi as the principal investigator. In addition, Coppi has taken a leading role in the Frascati Torus Program in Italy.

In 2018, MIT spun out the private company Commonwealth Fusion Systems, aiming to operate a high field breakeven tokamak. MIT described it as an evolution of concepts initiated by Bruno Coppi and Ron Parker.

== Awards ==
In 1987, Coppi received the James Clerk Maxwell Prize for Plasma Physics and also the Award of Excellence in Plasma Physics from the American Physical Society. He is a member of the American Academy of Arts and Sciences (since 1976), the American Association for the Advancement of Science, the National Virgilian Academy of Sciences, Letters and Arts and a fellow of the American Physical Society. He received the American Dante Alighieri Prize, the Science Prize of the Italian government, the science and technology prize from Italgas, and the gold medal of the Milan Polytechnic Institute.

In 2000, he was knighted Grand Officer of the Order of Merit of the Italian Republic.

In 2016, Coppi won the Antonio Feltrinelli International Prize for Chemistry and Physics from the Accademia nazionale dei Lincei.
