= Carl Grillmair =

Canadian astrophysicist (1959–2026)

- Born: Carl Johann Grillmair; 1959; Edmonton, Alberta, Canada
- Died: 16 February 2026 (aged 67); Llano, California, U.S.
- Cause of death: Gunshot wound
- Education: University of Calgary (BS); University of Victoria (MS); Australian National University (PhD)
- Spouse: Louise Grillmair
- Scientific career
- Fields: Astrophysics; astronomy
- Workplaces: Space Telescope Science Institute; University of California, Santa Cruz; California Institute of Technology
- Thesis: Dynamics of globular cluster systems (1993)
- Website: www.ipac.caltech.edu/science/staff/carl-grillmair

Carl Johann Grillmair (1959 – 16 February 2026) was a Canadian astronomer and astrophysicist. He was a research scientist at the California Institute of Technology beginning in 1997, where he studied exoplanets, galactic structure, and dark matter. He collaborated on prominent NASA telescope missions including the Hubble Space Telescope, Spitzer Space Telescope, and Wide-field Infrared Survey Explorer, and led the team that discovered water in the atmosphere of the hot Jupiter exoplanet HD 189733 b.

On 16 February 2026, Grillmair was fatally shot outside his home in Llano, an unincorporated community in Antelope Valley, California.

== Early life and education ==
Grillmair was born in Edmonton in 1959 to Leo and Elfi Grillmair. He had two younger siblings, including Walter Grillmair, who died in 1981. He was interested in astronomy since childhood. His father, Leo Grillmair, was a rock climber who, with Hans Gmoser and Isabel Spreat, made the first technical rock climb on Mount Yamnuska in 1952.

Grillmair earned a Bachelor of Science with honours in astrophysics from the University of Calgary in 1983, where he attended on a Cecil M. Brownlee bursary. He was awarded the Province of Alberta Award and the BP Canada Scholarship, and graduated with a Top Student in Physics prize.

He earned a Master of Science in astronomy from the University of Victoria in 1986, and held a Petrie Fellowship there in 1987. Grillmair briefly attended the University of Toronto in 1987 as an open doctoral fellow before being awarded the Natural Sciences and Engineering Research Council of Canada Ph.D. Scholarship and moving to the Australian National University in 1988. There, he studied the dynamics of globular clusters of stars and earned a doctorate in 1993.

== Career ==
As a graduate student, Grillmair worked as a data analyst at the Space Telescope Science Institute in Baltimore, Maryland, and on the International Ultraviolet Explorer at NASA's Goddard Space Flight Center. In 1992, he began working on the Wide Field and Planetary Camera, analyzing instrument data from the Hubble Space Telescope. He also helped test and calibrate its successor, the Wide Field and Planetary Camera 2, analyzing how efficiently the camera's charge-coupled device transferred and read out light—a property known as charge transfer efficiency—using data collected on orbit until 1997.

In 1994, Grillmair joined the Study of the Astrophysics of Globular Clusters in Extragalactic Systems (SAGES) collaboration, using Hubble images and spectroscopy from the W. M. Keck Observatory to study extragalactic globular cluster systems. He also studied stellar populations in the Local Group. Around the same time, along with principal investigators Douglas Richstone and Sandra Faber, he was a co-investigator on the NUKER collaboration, which used Hubble data to study the cores of nearby galaxies, until 2001. Grillmair worked with John Trauger in 1998 to investigate exoplanet imaging techniques for use on future telescopes, including the James Webb Space Telescope. From 2000 to 2010, he also worked with Stephanie A. Majewski as co-investigator on the Space Interferometry Mission, selecting a target list for the telescope, which was to study the structure and evolution of the galactic disc and halo. Grillmair collaborated with Kathryn Johnston on the Origins Billion Star Survey, intended to measure the position and motion of stars in the Milky Way, between 2004 and 2007.

Beginning in 2005, Grillmair was a co-investigator on the Virtual Planetary Laboratory with Victoria Meadows. During the same period, he led the exoplanet search team at the California Transit Authority from 2005 to 2007 and was involved with the Vera C. Rubin Observatory project in 2008. He was a principal investigator for the Palomar Transient Factory Galactic Dynamics project from 2007 to 2011. He was a member of the NASA Astrobiology Institute from 2009 to 2012.

He joined Caltech's Spitzer Science Center in 1997. He worked on the Spitzer Space Telescope, including on the Infrared Array Camera (IRAC) and briefly as a deputy lead on the Infrared Spectrograph (IRS) instrument. From 2010 to 2013, he was a co-investigator on FINESSE, a NASA Explorers Program proposal for a space telescope dedicated to the spectroscopic characterization of exoplanet atmospheres. NASA did not select FINESSE for flight after the European Space Agency chose a similar mission concept, ARIEL, for its own exoplanet-atmosphere survey in 2018. Beginning in 2010, he was also a calibration scientist on NASA's Wide-field Infrared Survey Explorer (WISE). He worked at the Infrared Processing and Analysis Center at Caltech before he died. In 2008, he led the team that reported the detection of water vapor in the dayside atmosphere of the hot Jupiter exoplanet HD 189733 b, based on spectra from the Spitzer Space Telescope.

== Personal life ==
Grillmair was married to Louise Grillmair. He was an avid pilot, flying gliders and sailplanes, and enjoyed repairing his home, where he kept a small observatory with multiple telescopes. He also enjoyed classical and rock music, cycling and clean energy.

== Killing ==
On Monday, 16 February 2026, Grillmair was fatally shot on his front porch in Llano, an unincorporated community in Antelope Valley, California. Paramedics pronounced him dead at the scene. The Los Angeles County Medical Examiner reported that Grillmair died from a single gunshot wound to the torso and prosecutors' charging documents state he was shot once in the neck.

Officers from the Los Angeles County Sheriff's Department in Palmdale responded to a call about a carjacking in the area and arrested a suspect, identified as 29-year-old Freddy Snyder, who had allegedly carjacked his mother after firing a rifle shot into the ceiling of her home. On 18 February, he was charged with Grillmair's murder, and separately charged with carjacking and burglary. Snyder lived two miles from Grillmair's residence and was reported as having a history of trespassing on Grillmair's property. Grillmair had reported him to police on 20 December 2025. Snyder was arrested on a weapons charge in that case and released three days later.

Snyder's arraignment was postponed three times — from 18 February to 26 March, then 29 April — before he pleaded not guilty to all charges on 26 May 2026. He remained held on US$3.175 million bail ahead of a preliminary hearing scheduled for 5 June 2026 in the Antelope Valley Courthouse, and faces up to life in prison if convicted. The case is being prosecuted by Deputy District Attorney Jeremy Davis.

Grillmair's killing was likened to that of Nuno Loureiro, a physicist at the Massachusetts Institute of Technology (MIT) who had been shot two months earlier. In April 2026, in response to the missing scientists conspiracy theory, the White House opened an investigation into the killings and disappearances of scientists and government officials, including retired Air Force Major General Neil McCasland and Monica Reza, a materials engineer at NASA's Jet Propulsion Laboratory.

Grillmair's widow, Louise Grillmair, rejected the conspiracy theory and told the press that she believed her husband was targeted in a misguided revenge plot. In the months before the killing, a man had trespassed on their property claiming to be hunting coyotes and causing disturbances at nearby homes. Although Grillmair had not called 911 to report the man, Louise believes the suspect blamed her husband for the police contact. Snyder returned with a baseball bat two weeks before the shooting, and then allegedly returned on 16 February and killed Grillmair.

The Los Angeles County Board of Supervisors honored Grillmair on 3 March 2026.

== Awards ==
- NASA Exceptional Scientific Achievement Medal (2011)
- Maclean's – Thirty-Nine Canadians Who Make the World a Better Place to Live In: Discoverers and Thinkers (2006)
- California Institute of Technology – Gemini Fellowship (1997)
