= Nuno Loureiro =

Portuguese plasma physicist (1977–2025)

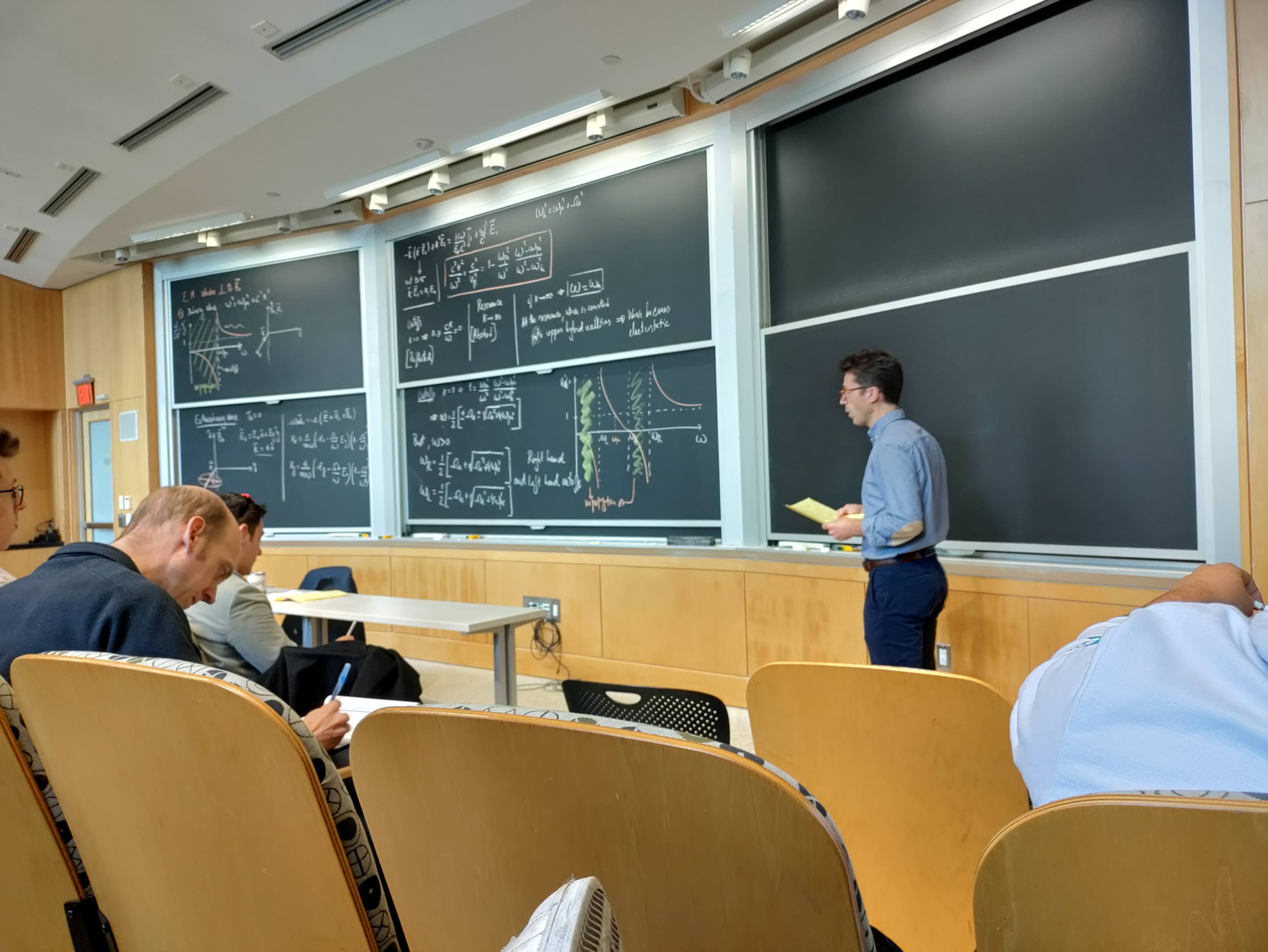
- Loureiro teaching at MIT in 2023
- Born: Nuno Filipe Gomes Loureiro; 1977; Viseu, Portugal
- Died: 16 December 2025 (aged 47); Boston, Massachusetts, U.S.
- Cause of death: Gunshot wounds
- Education: Instituto Superior Técnico (BS, MEng); Imperial College London (PhD)
- Children: 3
- Awards: Presidential Early Career Award (2025)
- Scientific career
- Fields: Magnetic reconnection; nuclear fusion; MHD turbulence
- Workplaces: Instituto Superior Técnico; Princeton Plasma Physics Laboratory; Culham Centre for Fusion Energy; Massachusetts Institute of Technology
- Thesis: Studies of nonlinear tearing mode reconnection (2005)
- Doctoral advisor: Malcolm Haines
- Website: nse.mit.edu/people/nuno-f-loureiro/

Nuno Filipe Gomes Loureiro (1977 – 16 December 2025) was a Portuguese plasma physicist. He was the Herman Feshbach Professor of Physics at the Massachusetts Institute of Technology (MIT) and director of the MIT Plasma Science and Fusion Center from 2024 until his murder in 2025. Authorities connected his murder to Cláudio Manuel Neves Valente, who was the perpetrator of the shooting at Brown University that occurred two days prior to Loureiro's murder.

== Early life and education ==
Nuno Filipe Gomes Loureiro was born in 1977 in Viseu, Portugal. He graduated from Alves Martins Secondary School. He studied physics at the Instituto Superior Técnico (IST) in Lisbon, graduating in 2000 with an undergraduate and master's degree. Loureiro attended Imperial College London and obtained a doctorate in physics in 2005, with a dissertation on tearing modes in plasma under the supervision of Malcolm Haines. His early research focused on magnetohydrodynamics and astrophysical plasmas.

== Career ==
In 2005, Loureiro joined the Princeton Plasma Physics Laboratory as a postdoctoral researcher and, after two years, he went to the Culham Centre for Fusion Energy, a laboratory under the UK Atomic Energy Authority. In 2009, he returned to Lisbon as a researcher at the Institute for Plasmas and Nuclear Fusion at the IST for seven years.

In 2016, Loureiro joined MIT as a professor and fusion scientist. He studied magnetic reconnection and plasma turbulence using computational simulations and published widely in scientific journals. He became a full professor of physics in 2021 with a joint appointment in the Department of Nuclear Science and Engineering. Loureiro was affiliated with the MIT Energy Initiative and the MIT Kavli Institute, and was a member of the American Physical Society.

In 2022, he became deputy director of the MIT Plasma Science and Fusion Center, MIT's largest lab, and he was appointed full director in May 2024. In January 2025, President Joe Biden presented Loureiro, among 10 other faculty members of the MIT, with the Presidential Early Career Award, the highest U.S. government honor for young scientists. From 2024 until his death, he served as the co-editor of the scientific journal, Journal of Plasma Physics.

=== Teaching ===
Loureiro was twice recognized with the MIT Department of Nuclear Science and Engineering PAI Outstanding Professor Award for teaching the courses "Intro to Plasma Physics" and "MHD Theory of Fusion Systems".

== Murder ==
Loureiro was shot in the foyer of the apartment building where he lived in Brookline, Massachusetts, on the evening of 15 December 2025. He was transported to Beth Israel Deaconess Medical Center in Boston with gunshot wounds, where he was pronounced dead early on 16 December. Authorities opened a homicide investigation that received widespread publicity.

Portugal's Minister of Foreign Affairs Paulo Rangel announced his death to the Parliament of Portugal. The president of Portugal, Marcelo Rebelo de Sousa, issued a statement calling his death "an irreplaceable loss for science", and the U.S. ambassador to Portugal released a statement with condolences. MIT president Sally Kornbluth published a message to the MIT community, and professors from across the university made public remarks regarding Loureiro's life and work. A vigil was held by his home in Brookline.

On 18 December, authorities announced that they were investigating a link between Loureiro's murder and the shooting at Brown University two days prior that killed two and injured nine. Authorities confirmed the link later that day at a press conference announcing the suicide of the lone suspect in the Brown University shooting, Cláudio Manuel Neves Valente, a Portuguese national. The Connecticut State Police Forensic Science Lab confirmed that one of the firearms found with Valente matched the weapon used in Loureiro's murder. Valente attended the Instituto Superior Técnico with Loureiro from 1995 to 2000, graduating first in his class, ahead of Loureiro. Later that same day, authorities found Valente dead of a self-inflicted gunshot inside a storage unit in New Hampshire.

As of April 2026, the killing of Loureiro is under investigation as part of a White House probe into people with high government clearance and scientists who have died or gone missing in recent years, including Monica Jacinto, a materials engineer at NASA's Jet Propulsion Laboratory, retired Air Force Major General Neil McCasland, and Caltech astronomer Carl Grillmair, among others.

== Personal life ==
Loureiro was married and had three daughters. He was an avid participant in local pick-up football games.

== Awards ==
- Presidential Early Career Award for Scientists and Engineers (2025)
- Los Alamos National Laboratory Stanisław Ulam Distinguished Scholar (2023)
- MIT School of Engineering Ruth & Joel Spira Award for Excellence in Teaching (2022)
- Amar G. Bose Research Grant (2018)
- National Science Foundation CAREER Award (2017)
- American Physical Society Thomas H. Stix Award for Outstanding Early Career Contributions to Plasma Physics Research (2015)
