= 2025 Brown University shooting =

Mass shooting in Rhode Island, US

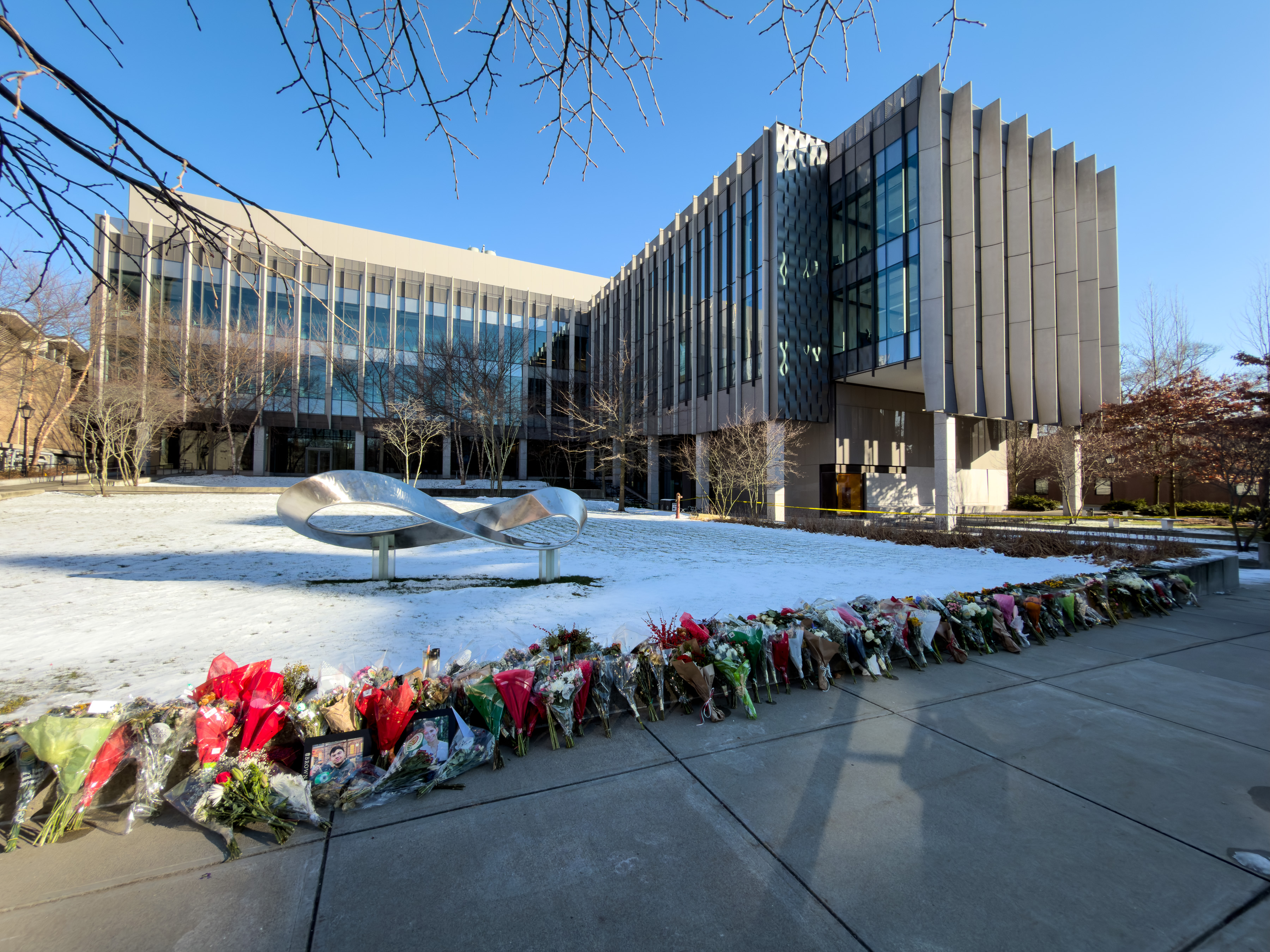
- Memorial outside Brown's Engineering Research Center
- 1 Location of Brown University; 2 Location of Brookline
- Location: 41.8265°N 71.3979°W; Brown University; Providence, Rhode Island, U.S. 42.3481°N 71.1230°W; Brookline, Massachusetts, U.S.
- Date: Shooting: December 13, 2025 c. 4:00 p.m. (EST); Murder of Loureiro: December 15, 2025 c. 8:30 p.m. (EST)
- Attack type: Mass shooting; spree shooting; school shooting; murder-suicide
- Weapons: Two 9mm Glock handguns: Glock 34 (Brown University); Glock 26 (Loureiro)
- Deaths: 4 (including the perpetrator and Nuno Loureiro)
- Injuries: 9
- Perpetrator: Cláudio Manuel Neves Valente
- Motive: Resentment

On December 13, 2025, a mass shooting occurred at Brown University in Providence, Rhode Island, United States, during the second day of the final examination weeks for the fall semester. The shooter, Cláudio Manuel Neves Valente, entered the Barus and Holley Building and killed two students and wounded nine other students who were attending a review session, and then fled the scene before police arrived.

Two days later, on December 15, Nuno Loureiro, a Massachusetts Institute of Technology physics professor and former classmate of Valente, was fatally shot at his home in Brookline, Massachusetts. During a five-day manhunt by the Federal Bureau of Investigation (FBI) and local police, officials released images and videos of the perpetrator, whose identity was initially unknown to authorities.

Valente was a Portuguese national with United States permanent resident status. He dropped out of Brown's graduate school in 2001. On December 18, he was found dead of a self-inflicted gunshot inside a storage unit in Salem, New Hampshire. He was found with two guns; officials said the suicide weapon was the gun used in the Brown University shooting.

On April 29, 2026, the FBI and the United States Attorney’s Office for the District of Massachusetts concluded their investigation into the shooting, saying that Valente was motivated by an accumulation of grievances that he collected throughout his life, which included how he viewed his life achievements and feeling he was considerably marginalized by others.

== Background ==
Brown University is an Ivy League university in the College Hill neighborhood of Providence, Rhode Island, where it owns more than 230 buildings. In 2023, it enrolled about 11,500 undergraduate, graduate, and medical students. The shooting was one of many school shootings in the United States.

== Shootings ==
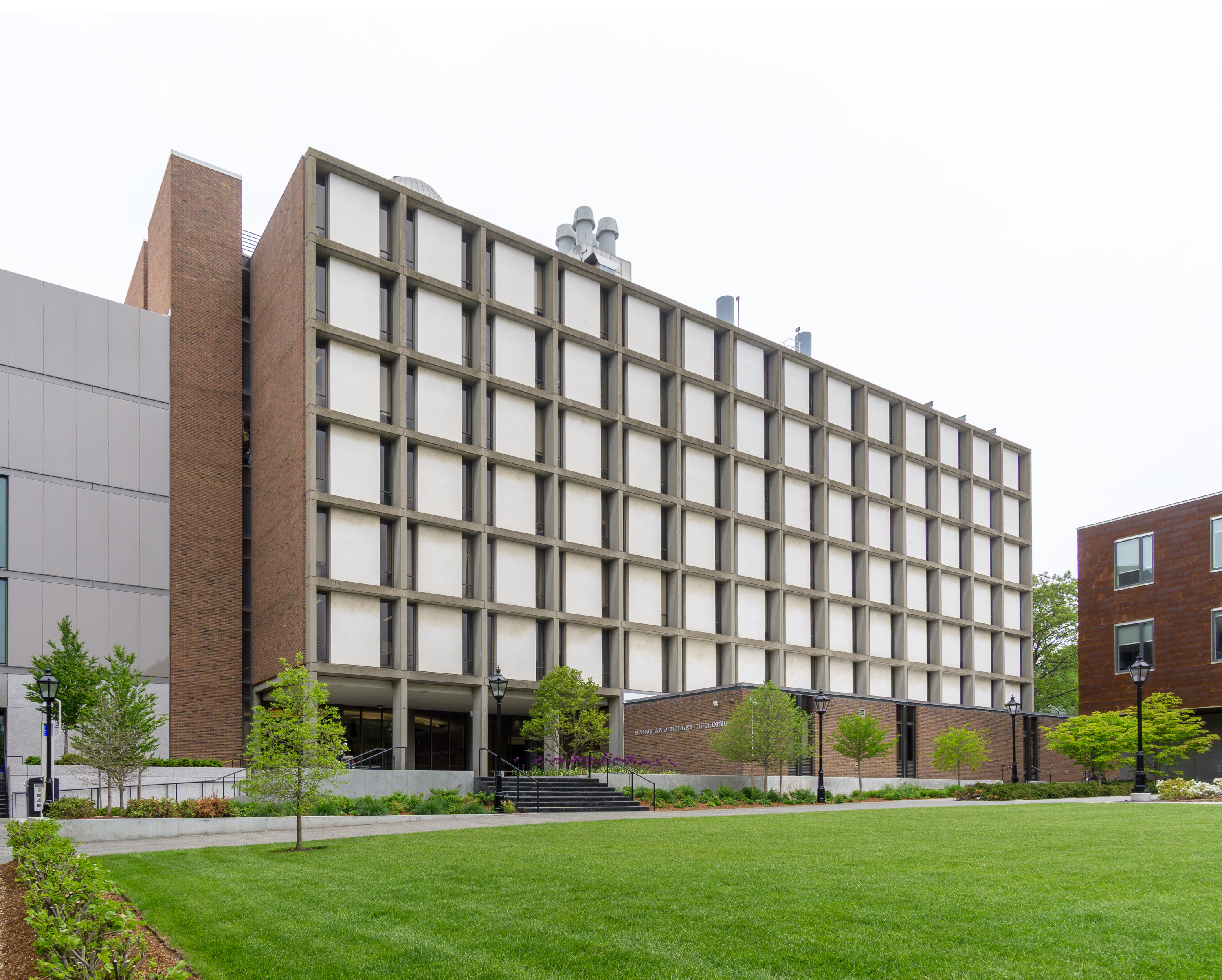
The Barus and Holley building, where the shooting occurred, pictured in 2018

Location of the Barus and Holley building in Brown University

Shortly after 4 p.m. EST on December 13, 2025, Cláudio Manuel Neves Valente shot 11 people in the Brown University School of Engineering's Barus and Holley Building, which also houses the university's physics department.

Most of the shooting took place inside the first-floor, 186-seat Room 166, where a 21-year-old teaching assistant was leading an optional review session for a final exam in economics. It was the second day of the school's final examination week for the fall 2025 semester. The building was unlocked. It is unknown how Valente entered the building, but authorities said he moved through a part of the building that had limited surveillance cameras and exited on the Hope Street side.

The teaching assistant said in an interview that the masked gunman entered just as the class was ending and fired 40 rounds. The two students who were killed either had been sitting on the left side of the classroom or were walking up the room's aisle as Valente entered.

At 4:22 p.m., the university's Public Safety and Emergency Management issued the first alert message to the campus community about "an active shooter near Barus & Holley Engineering". At 4:50 p.m., the university sent an alert message erroneously saying that a suspect was in custody; it sent a correction 20 minutes later. At 5:27 p.m., the university sent an alert message about reported gunfire near Governor Street; it retracted the message at 6:10 p.m., calling the report "unfounded".

Location of Loureiro's home in Brookline

On December 15, at around 8:30 p.m. MIT physics professor Nuno Loureiro was shot in the foyer of the apartment building where he lived in Brookline, Massachusetts. He was taken to Beth Israel Deaconess Medical Center in Boston with gunshot wounds, where he was pronounced dead the morning of December 16.

=== Victims ===
Two students were killed, and nine other students were wounded in the Brown University shooting. The two Brown students who were killed were identified as Ella Cook, a parishioner at the Cathedral Church of the Advent in Birmingham, Alabama and vice president of Brown's College Republicans, and Mukhammad Aziz Umurzokov, an Uzbek American and recent graduate of Midlothian High School in Chesterfield County, Virginia.

All nine of the wounded people were transported to the university-affiliated Rhode Island Hospital for gun-related injuries. One of the victims had a shrapnel injury and was discharged from the hospital after a few hours. Two more were discharged on December 16 and 17 and the remaining six were all reported to be in stable condition on December 18. By January 5 all nine students had been treated and released from the hospital.

Loureiro had been the director of the MIT Plasma Science and Fusion Center from 2024 until his death. Authorities linked a rental car to both shootings and determined one of the guns found on Valente's body was used in Loureiro's killing. Loureiro and Valente attended the University of Lisbon's school of engineering and technology together in Portugal.

== Manhunt ==
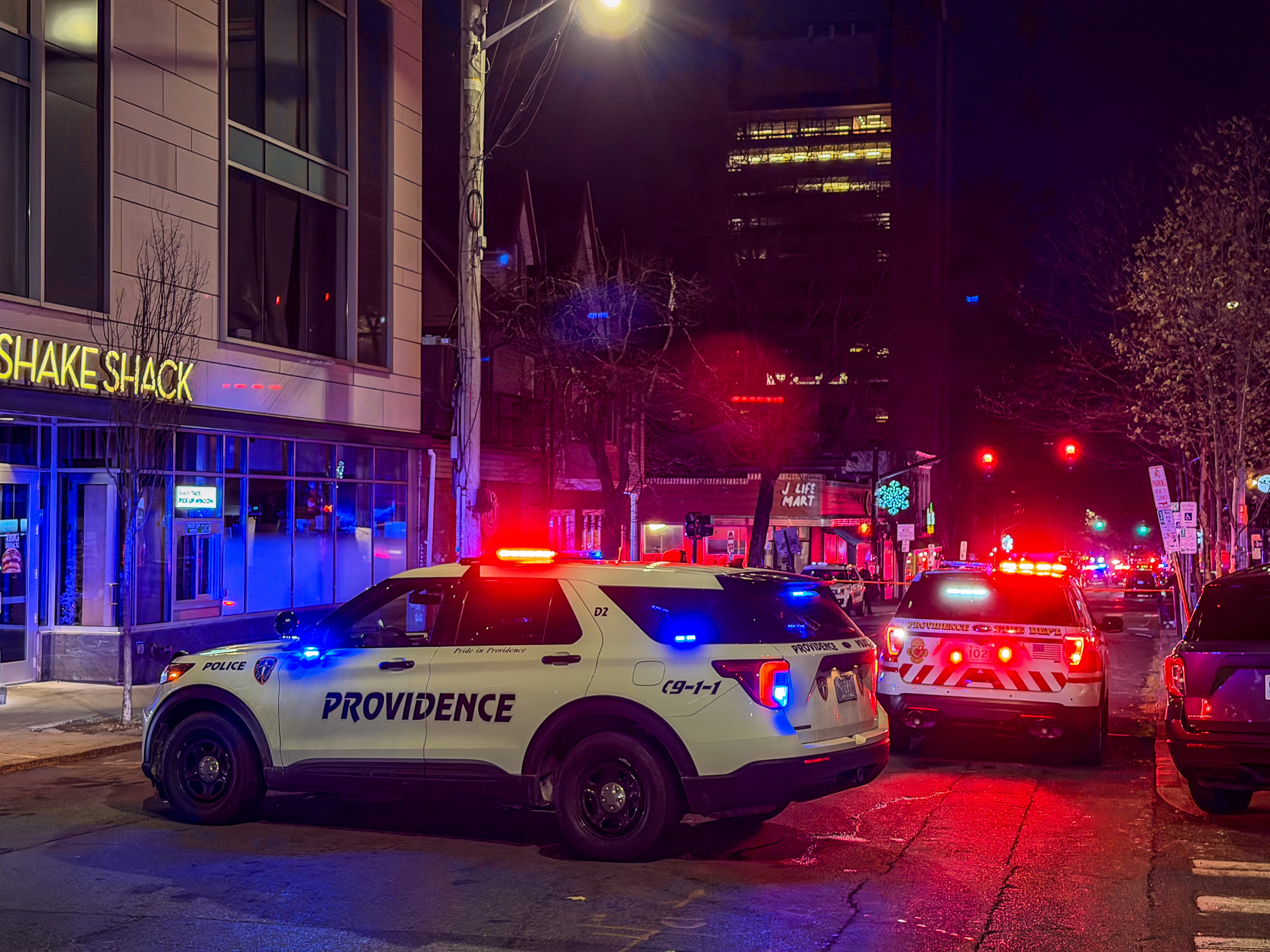
Police block off a street near the school on the night of the shooting

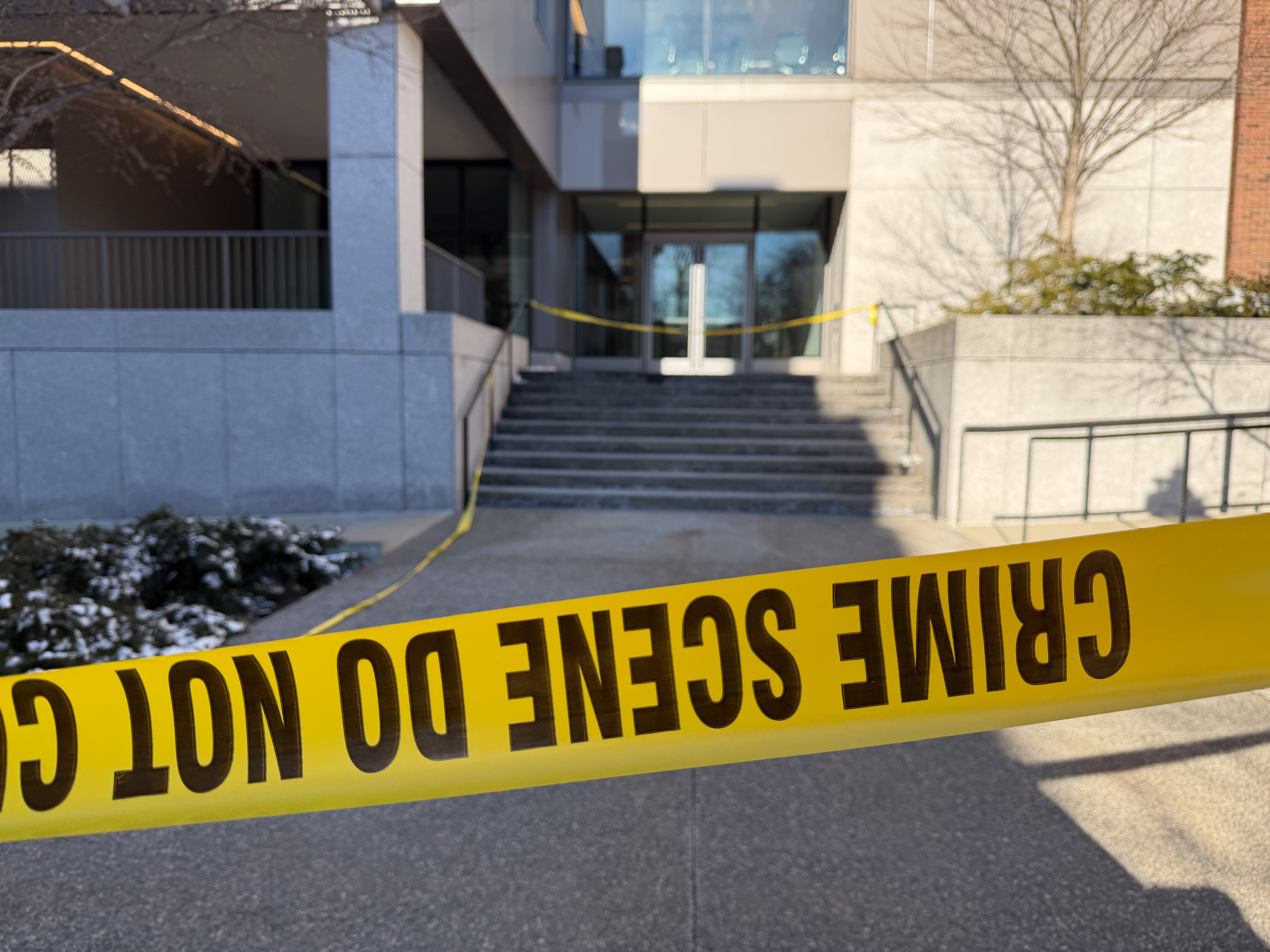
Police tape at the scene

Over 400 police officers responded to the incident, along with the federal Bureau of Alcohol, Tobacco, Firearms and Explosives (ATF) and the Federal Bureau of Investigation (FBI). Because both the FBI's planes were unavailable, the FBI's evidence response team drove from Virginia to Rhode Island overnight and reached the scene on December 14 at 9:00 a.m. (Note: In February 2026, a whistleblower report to Congress stated that no FBI planes were available because FBI director Kash Patel had used one of the agency's two planes to visit his parents in Florida and had frozen the other in place by putting the agency's Hostage Rescue Team on standby.) Rhode Island governor Dan McKee also ordered the Rhode Island State Police to support policing efforts in the days that followed.

In the hours immediately following the shooting, authorities found shell casings and believed the shooter used a handgun. Shortly after a 10 p.m. press conference, the Providence Police Department released security footage of the suspect, which two days later remained the "clearest picture we have of the individual we believe to be responsible," according to Providence mayor Smiley. Authorities asked nearby residents for any relevant video footage from smart doorbells.

Overnight, it snowed, which hampered the collection of physical evidence such as fingerprints. The morning after the shooting, acting on information from Providence Police, the FBI raided a hotel in Rhode Island and detained a man. FBI agents also raided a home in another state, where the local police department confirmed that the FBI was investigating the shooting. The FBI declined to comment on the raid, and the detained man was released the same day. Rhode Island attorney general Peter Neronha stated that "there is no basis to consider him a person of interest". The ballistics evidence from the crime scene did not match the gun in the man's possession.

On December 15, Providence Police released images and three more videos of the suspect. One video shows the suspect wearing a black beanie, a mask, a green jacket, and black gloves. Providence Police Department chief Oscar Perez said the shooter had used a 9mm firearm. The FBI offered a $50,000 reward for information related to the perpetrator.

On December 17, Providence Police released a street map of where the suspect was confirmed to have been on the day of the shooting. That same day, authorities also revealed that they had found DNA and fingerprint evidence on shell casings at the crime scene. Police also received a tip regarding a post on Reddit about a suspicious vehicle near the area at the time, which "blew this case wide open," according to Rhode Island Attorney General Peter Neronha.

The Reddit post had information on a tip to look for a gray Nissan Sentra that had Florida license plates. The person who made the Reddit post is a homeless Brown graduate who have had several encounters with the suspect in Providence before meeting with the police for an interview on December 17. The tipster, known anonymously as "John", identified the car from surveillance footage in the interview, allowing police to track the car using Flock Safety cameras and obtain the suspect's name and face via the rental agreement and CCTV footage from the Alamo Rent a Car in downtown Boston where the car was rented. Providence mayor Brett Smiley has requested in a letter to FBI director Kash Patel that John be paid the full $50,000 reward.

== Investigation ==
On December 18, law enforcement sources said the shooting may be connected to the December 15 fatal shooting of MIT professor Nuno Loureiro at his home in Brookline, Massachusetts, two days after the Brown shooting. On December 18, with an arrest warrant in the Brown case, police went to an Extra Space Storage facility in Salem, New Hampshire, located nearly 355 feet (108 m) from the Massachusetts border, and found 48-year-old Portuguese national Cláudio Manuel Neves Valente dead inside. Two guns were found on his body. Perez said Valente had killed himself from a self-inflicted gunshot wound. The autopsy found that he had been dead for two days.

On January 6, 2026, the Justice Department released a transcript of video recordings found in the storage facility. In the recordings, Valente confessed to the murders, saying that he had been planning them for years, but did not give a motive.

On Aug 19, 2026, the city of Providence released an assessment of its response to the incident. The report found flaws in the hunt for Valente, but praised the city's response to the shooting.

== Perpetrator ==
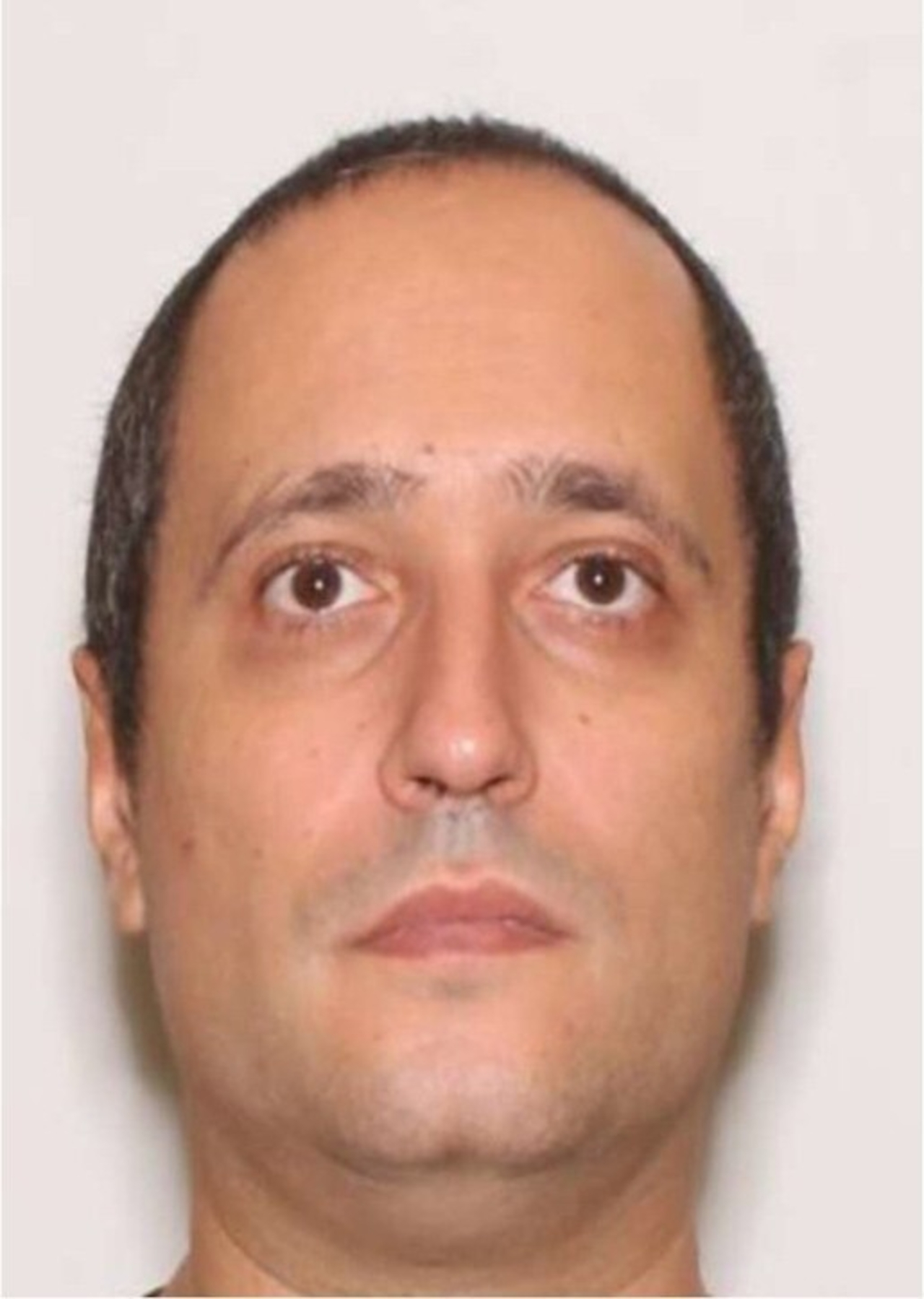
Undated handout photo of Cláudio Manuel Neves Valente

Cláudio Manuel Neves Valente (January 22, 1977 – December 16, 2025) was born in Torres Novas, Portugal. He studied at the same university as Loureiro, the Instituto Superior Técnico in Lisbon, from 1995 until 2000 and reportedly avoided his parents. After graduating first in his class from the school ahead of Loureiro, he enrolled in the physics PhD program at Brown University in September 2000. He took a leave of absence in April 2001 and formally withdrew from the doctoral program in July 2003. Valente lived in Providence during his time at Brown. Former classmates at the Instituto described him as a "brilliant" but arrogant student. According to Scott Watson, a physics professor at Syracuse University and a close friend and former classmate at Brown, Valente was "often unhappy and even angry, complaining that classes were too easy and that the food on Brown's campus was subpar" during the time they were both doctoral students.

After leaving Brown, Valente returned to Portugal, working as an IT specialist for SAPO. He later won the Diversity Immigrant Visa lottery, obtaining U.S. permanent residency in April 2017. He had no criminal record. His last known address was in the working-class neighborhood of Ives Estates, Florida. Beginning on November 28, 2025, he was observed on the Brown campus by multiple people who found his behavior suspicious.

== Reactions ==
=== Brown University ===
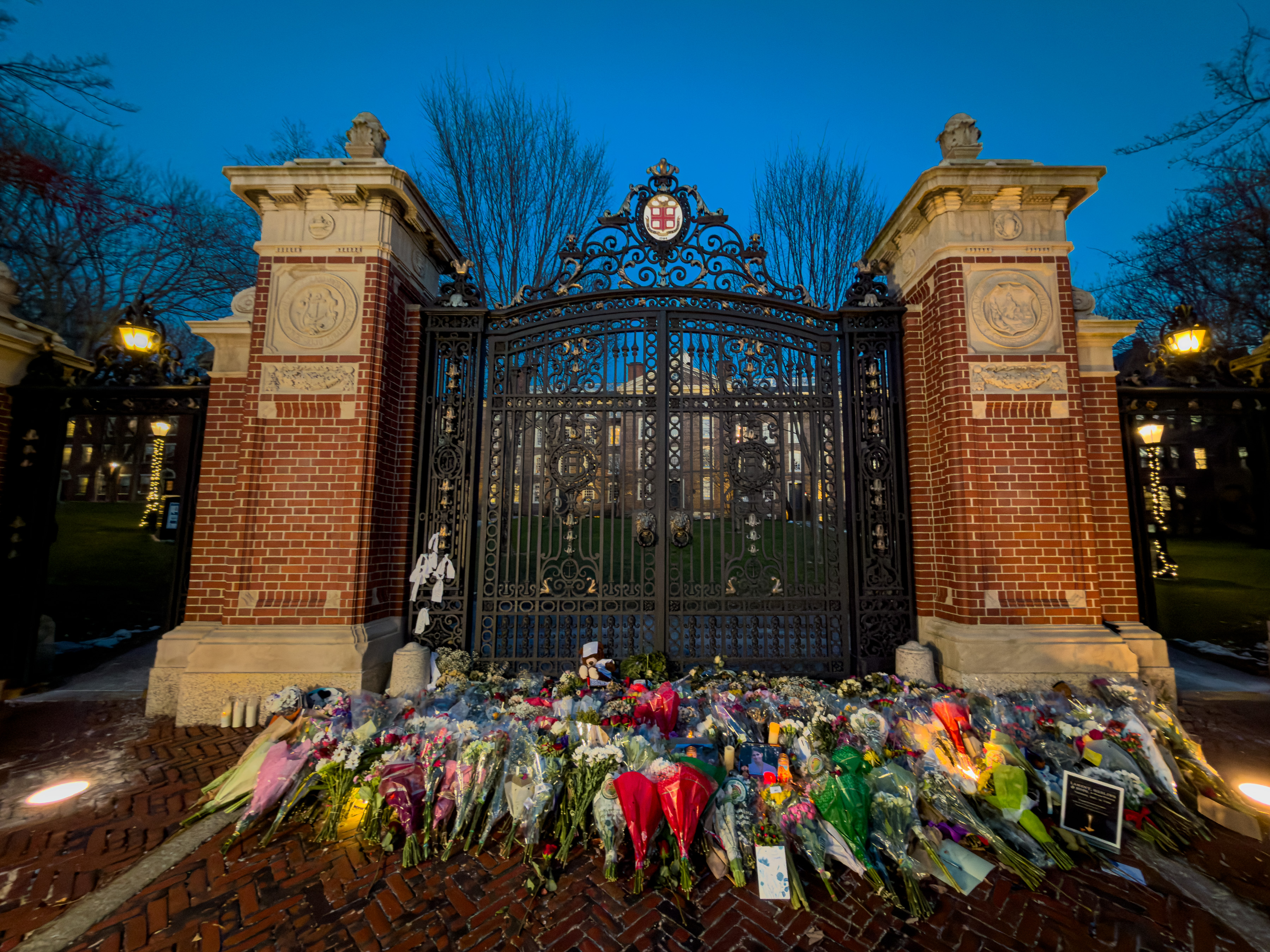
Well-wishers left flowers by the Van Wickle Gates

Brown University provost Francis J. Doyle III announced that classes and exams for the rest of the fall term were canceled. Other universities and academic institutions, including Columbia University, Cornell University, and the American Mathematical Society, issued statements condemning the shooting and offering sympathy and support for the Brown community.

Brown police chief Rodney Chatman was temporarily replaced by former Providence police chief Hugh Clements after the shooting. Chatman was previously criticized for his handling of threats and incidents, was given a vote of no confidence by the police union, and The Brown Daily Herald published allegations his department tolerated harassment based on gender and sexual orientation.

On Aug 28, 2026, Brown University released its Safety and Security Action Plan following an external review conducted by Teneo Risk. The review said that it is highly unlikely that the attack could have been prevented, but it criticized delays in accessing surveillance footage and "notable gaps in leadership" at the campus police.

=== Other schools ===
Durham Academy in Durham, North Carolina, released a statement: "Our school community is rallying around Kendall [Turner], her classmates, and her loved ones, and we will continue to offer our full support in the days ahead." Turner was, at that time, in critical condition after being shot. She had recently graduated from Durham Academy.

=== Politicians ===
President Trump speaks with the press and addresses the shooting

On the afternoon of the shooting, U.S. president Donald Trump said, "Things can happen. So to the nine injured – get well fast; and to the families of those two that are no longer with us, I pay my deepest regards and respects from the United States of America." After the shooter's body was discovered on December 18, he ordered Homeland Security Secretary Kristi Noem to suspend the Diversity Immigrant Visa program, which awarded up to 50,000 US visas per year via lottery, ostensibly because the shooter had attained permanent residency through the program in 2017. As the program was created by an act of Congress, the legality of the order was not clear.

Massachusetts governor Maura Healey expressed her support for the victims of the shooting. Both U.S. senators from Alabama, Katie Britt and Tommy Tuberville, released statements mourning the death of Ella Cook. Uzbekistan's Ministry of Foreign Affairs released a statement mourning the death of Mukhammad Aziz Umurzokov.

=== Organizations ===
The day after the shooting, December 14, 2025, was the 13th anniversary of the 2012 Sandy Hook Elementary School shooting. The anti-gun violence nonprofit Sandy Hook Promise released a statement which in part read: "Our hearts are with Brown University as this tragic story unfolds. We cannot allow this to keep happening. We must #EndGunViolence."

=== Media ===
Some in the media, such as Juliette Kayyem in The Atlantic and Lucy Feldman in TIME, contextualized the shooting within a pattern of gun violence in American schools. Also writing for The Atlantic, Xochitl Gonzalez, who is a trustee and alumna of Brown University, considered the perceived deadlocks within American gun politics and whether such shootings in the United States are inevitable, given its political climate. In addition, Brown professors Philip Chan and Amy Nunn argued for a "redefining" of gun violence in USA Today, writing that "there is a desperate need for greater community and school-based efforts to destigmatize and promote mental health services and nonviolent concepts."

Others in the media also commented on the extended time it took to find the perpetrator of the shooting. For instance, in The Washington Post, Jim Geraghty considered the role of surveillance cameras in public safety given their simultaneous prevalence and lack of full coverage on the Brown University campus. Brandon del Pozo, who is a professor at Brown's Warren Alpert Medical School, argued in The Atlantic that various factors, including in part "the odds and a little intelligent preparation on the part of the assailant", led to the delay, which del Pozo argued could not be blamed on law enforcement.

== Misinformation and conspiracy theories ==
Right-wing figures on social media repeatedly stated, without evidence, that a Palestinian Brown University student was the shooter. These included anonymous accounts, as well as venture capitalist Shaun Maguire; billionaire hedge fund manager Bill Ackman; far-right activist and Trump loyalist Laura Loomer; right-wing podcaster Tim Pool; and senior Justice Department official Harmeet Dhillon. One of Valente's victims, MIT professor Nuno Loureiro, was also wrongly identified by Maguire as Jewish and a supporter of Israel. Additionally, Loomer baselessly alleged that the shooter had shouted "Allahu Akbar" before firing upon the lecture hall. Loomer's allegation was refuted by Valente in his recorded confession. Republican officials, including Alabama senator Tommy Tuberville, claimed without evidence that the killing of Ella Cook was motivated by her being the vice president of the Brown University College Republicans.

By December 16, Brown University had deleted the wrongly accused student's profile pages from its website to protect them from harassment and doxxing attempts. In a statement published on December 19, the student described the doxxing as "an unimaginable nightmare". Legal representatives for the student stated that racism against Palestinians was at the core of the accusations. Rhode Island Senator Sheldon Whitehouse criticized these conspiracy theories during a Senate Judiciary Committee meeting that same month, telling people who believed in these theories to "please just knock it off." After Valente's responsibility for the shootings was publicly clarified, Rhode Island police said that speculation posted online had not been helpful and had complicated the investigation.

Online speculation linking Louirero's murder and nine other deaths and disappearances of scientists and in the United States led to an FBI probe attempting to find connections between the case.

== See also ==
- List of mass shootings in the United States in 2025
- List of school shootings in the United States (2000–present)
- 2025 Bondi Beach shooting, another infamous shooting that happened one day later. Both had criticisms for perceived failures in the law enforcement response to the shooting.
- 2026 Pawtucket shooting, another shooting that occurred in Rhode Island.
