= Emily Belli =

American physicist

Emily Ann Belli is an American physicist who works for General Atomics in San Diego, California, on exascale simulation of the plasma in magnetic confinement fusion devices.

Belli completed her Ph.D. in physics at Princeton University in 2006, with the dissertation Studies of Numerical Algorithms for Gyrokinetics and the Effects of Shaping on Plasma Turbulence supervised by Greg Hammett. She has worked for General Atomics since 2006.

Belli was named as a Fellow of the American Physical Society (APS) in 2024, after a nomination from the APS Division of Plasma Physics, "for pioneering contributions to first-principles simulations of transport and turbulence in strongly rotating plasmas, including the elucidation of critical impurity transport issues associated with metal walls and the reversal of simple hydrogenic isotope scaling laws in tokamak edge turbulence".

Belli is also a marathon runner who placed second in the Tri-City Medical Center Carlsbad Marathon in Carlsbad, California in January 2011 and second in the July 2011 San Francisco Marathon.
