= Monica Reza =

American metallurgist (born c. 1965)

Monica Jacinto Reza
- Born: Monica Andrea Jacinto; December 30, 1964 (age 61)
- Disappeared: June 22, 2025 (aged 60); Angeles National Forest, Los Angeles County
- Status: Missing for 1 year, 4 months and 21 days
- Education: Columbia University (BS); UCLA (MS)
- Scientific career
- Fields: Aerospace; metallurgy; materials science; superalloy
- Workplaces: Aerojet Rocketdyne; Jet Propulsion Laboratory

Monica Andrea Jacinto Reza (born December 30, 1964) is an American metallurgist and materials engineer. In the mid-1990s, she co-invented Mondaloy, a nickel-based superalloy used in rocket engines, while working at Rocketdyne.

On June 22, 2025, she disappeared while hiking in the Angeles National Forest. Her disappearance is under investigation as part of the White House probe into the missing scientists conspiracy theory.

== Early life and education ==
She earned a Bachelor of Science in metallurgical engineering from Columbia University. She later attended the University of California, Los Angeles (UCLA), earning a Master of Science in materials engineering in 1997.

== Career ==
Reza started her career working at Rocketdyne, then a division of Rockwell International, in 1988. At Rocketdyne, Reza began working on the problem of oxygen-rich staged combustion cycle engines. American engine manufacturers had historically avoided the design because oxygen gas tended to combust engine components at high pressures. By the mid-1990s, she and Dallis Hardwick (1950–2015), an Australian metallurgist at the Rockwell Science Center and the first woman to earn a doctorate in metallurgy from the University of New South Wales, developed Mondaloy, a nickel-based superalloy that withstands high-pressure, high-temperature gaseous oxygen without combusting. The material does not require protective coatings and maintains structural strength at extreme operating conditions, allowing rocket engine components to be lighter and more reliable.

In 1999, Reza collaborated with the Air Force Research Laboratory (AFRL) as part of a cost-sharing program to scale up production and refine processing methods for Mondaloy. NASA also funded research into the alloy in the early 2000s for potential use in large oxygen-rich booster engines. The alloy was eventually used in approximately 12 components of Aerojet Rocketdyne's AR1 engine and the Hydrocarbon Boost Technology Demonstrator. In 2003, she was awarded the first of three patents applications that she would receive for her invention of burn-resistant and high tensile strength metal alloys.

In 2004, while working at Boeing as an associate technical fellow, Reza received the inaugural Luminary Award from the Hispanic Engineer National Achievement Awards Corporation (HENAAC), recognizing her contributions to the Hispanic technical community and her work "inspiring youth to pursue engineering and technical careers". In 2016, Aerojet Rocketdyne announced a major milestone in rocket propulsion technology citing Reza's advancement. In 2026, a House Oversight Committee press release cited public reporting that Reza had worked as a director of materials and processing at NASA’s Jet Propulsion Laboratory (JPL).

Patents application for Jacinto
Patent name	Inventors	Date	Patent application number
Burn-resistant and high tensile strength metal alloys	Monica A. Jacinto et al.	3/20/2003	US-20030053926-A1
Burn-resistant and high tensile strength metal alloys	Monica A. Jacinto et al.	10/21/2004	US-20040208777-A1
Burn-resistant and high tensile strength metal alloys	Monica A. Jacinto et al.	10/21/2010	US-20100266442-A1

== Disappearance ==
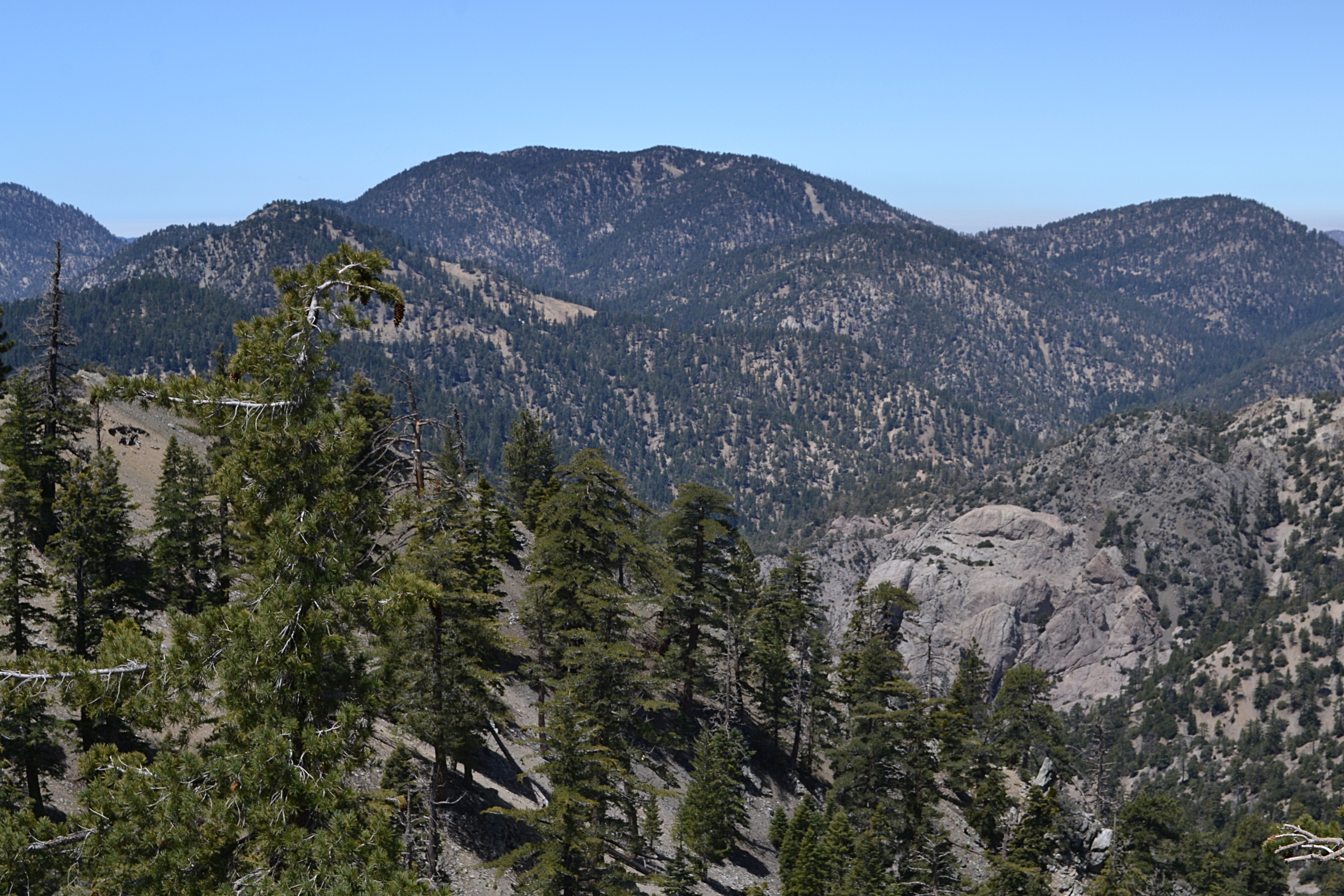
Mount Waterman in Los Angeles County

Location of Mount Waterman

On the morning of June 22, 2025, Reza disappeared while hiking in the Angeles National Forest. Reza had been hiking with two companions from her yoga group. Reporting based on their accounts to Reza's family suggest that after the female companion stopped partway, Reza summited with the male companion. The male companion stated that they had been running during the steep descent, and he lost her when running ahead. After initiating a search effort, search and rescue dogs were only able to locate her beanie, but were unable to track her further. She has been listed as a missing person by California's Office of the Attorney General since June 22, 2025.

Her disappearance was under investigation as part of a White House probe into people with high government clearance and scientists who have died or gone missing in recent years, including retired Air Force major general Neil McCasland, Caltech astronomer Carl Grillmair, and MIT fusion scientist Nuno Loureiro, among others. The probe occurred in response to the missing scientists conspiracy theory. At the time of her disappearance, Reza had taken a hiatus from her role at JPL to care for a sick family member.
