= IGNITOR =

Italian nuclear fusion research project

Ignitor
- Device type: Tokamak
- Affiliation: ENEA

Technical specifications
- Major radius: 1.32 m
- Minor radius: 0.47 m × 0.86 m
- Plasma volume: 10 m^{3}
- Magnetic field: 13 T
- Heating power: 12.8 MW
- Fusion power: 100 MW
- Discharge duration: 4 s
- Plasma current: 11 MA
- Plasma temperature: 122×10^{6} K

History
- Date(s) of construction: never built

Ignitor is the Italian name for a proposed tokamak device, developed by ENEA. The project was abandoned in 2022.

== History ==
Started in 1977 by Prof. Bruno Coppi at MIT, Ignitor based on the 1970s Alcator machine at MIT which pioneered the high magnetic field approach to plasma magnetic confinement, continued with the Alcator C/C-Mod at MIT and the FT/FTU series of experiments. It was initially proposed to be built "in the area of the former Caorso nuclear power station". Later the intended location was at Troitsk near Moscow.

Ignitor was designed to produce approximately 100 MW of fusion power despite its relatively small size. For comparison, the intended weight was 500 metric tons, while the ITER international reactor, expected to be the first tokamak to reach scientific breakeven, is some 19,000 tons.

=== 2010 ===
At a meeting with the scientific attachés of the European embassies in Moscow in early February 2010, Mikhail Kovalchuk, Director of the Kurchatov Institute, announced that an initiative aimed at developing a fast paced joint research programme in nuclear fusion research was strongly supported by the Governments of Russia and Italy.

The original proposal had been initiated earlier by Evgeny Velikhov (President of the Kurchatov Institute) and Bruno Coppi (Head of the High Energy Plasmas Undertaking, MIT) during the early developments of the Alcator C-Mod programme at MIT, where well known scientists of the Kurchatov Institute made key contributions to experiments that identified the unique confinement and purity properties of the high density plasmas produced by the high field Alcator machine. In effects this investigated, for the first time, physical processes leading to attain self-sustained fusion burning plasmas.

The collaboration with the Kurchatov Institute is directed at the construction of the Ignitor machine, the first experiment proposed to achieve ignition conditions by nuclear fusion reactions on the basis of existing knowledge of plasma physics and available technologies. Ignitor is part of the line of research on high magnetic field, experiments producing high density plasmas that began with the Alcator and the Frascati Torus programmes at MIT and in Italy, respectively. Coppi claimed that IGNITOR would be a bigger step towards fusion power than the international ITER project, but several fusion scientists contested this in 2010.

According to existing plans, Ignitor will be installed at the Triniti site at Troitsk near Moscow, that has facilities which can be upgraded to house and operate the machine. This site will become open and made to be easily accessible to scientists of all nations. The management of the relevant research programme will involve Italy and Russia only to facilitate the success of the enterprise. The proponents have suggested that the US become an Associate Member of this effort with a similar arrangement to that made with CERN for its participation in the LHC (Large Hadron Collider) Programme.

The goal to produce meaningful fusion reactors in a reasonable time leads to pursuing the achievement of ignition conditions in the near term in order to understand the plasma physical regimes needed for a net power producing reactor. In addition, an objective other than ignition that can be envisioned for the relatively near term is that of high flux neutron sources for material testing involving compact, high density fusion machines. This has been one of the incentives that have led the Ignitor Project to adopt magnesium diboride (MgB_{2}) superconducting cables in the machine design, a first in fusion research. Accordingly, the largest coils (about 5m diameter) of the machine will be made entirely of MgB_{2} cables.

In the context of the Italy-Russia summit meeting held in Milan on 26 April 2010 the agreement to proceed with the proposed joint Ignitor programme has been signed. The participants, from the Russian side, have included the Prime Minister Vladimir Putin, the Deputy Prime Minister Igor Sechin, the Energy Minister Sergei Shmatko, and the Vice Minister of Education and Research Sergey Mazurenko. Participants from the Italian side have included Prime Minister Silvio Berlusconi, the Foreign Affairs Advisor to the Prime Minister Valentino Valentini (who had a key role in forging the agreement on the Ignitor programme), and the Minister of Education and Research Mariastella Gelmini who, together with Sergey Mazurenko, signed the agreement in the presence of the two Prime Ministers.

=== After 2010 ===
In 2013, new developments and issues for the Ignitor experiment were published. The Ignitor project Conceptual Design Report was prepared by a joint Russian-Italian working group in 2015. A 2015 study reports the advances made in different areas of the physics and technology that are relevant to the Ignitor project. A safety analysis study for Ignitor at the TRINITI site was published in 2017. A risks analysis of the project realization phase was published in 2017. An informal exchange meeting took place in 2017. The fuel cycle concept was presented in 2020. In 2022 the field-coil design was revised.

In October 2022 it was reported that the National Research Council of Italy has abandoned the project.
