= Journal of Plasma Physics =

Scientific journal

- Discipline: Plasma physics, space physics
- Language: English
- Edited by: Alex Schekochihin

Publication details
- History: 1967—present
- Publisher: Cambridge University Press
- Frequency: Bimonthly
- Open access: Yes
- Impact factor: 2.5 (2024)

Standard abbreviations
- ISO 4: J. Plasma Phys.

Indexing
- CODEN: JPLPBZ
- ISSN: 0022-3778 (print); 1469-7807 (web)

Links
- Journal homepage; Online access; Online archive

Journal of Plasma Physics is a peer-reviewed and open access scientific journal published bimonthly by Cambridge University Press. Established in 1967, it covers research on plasma physics, with a focus on magnetically confined plasmas, inertial confinement fusion, space physics and astrophysical plasmas. Its current editor-in-chief is Alex Schekochihin (University of Oxford).

Former editors-in-chief of the journal include George H. Miley (University of Illinois Urbana-Champaign), Padma Kant Shukla (Ruhr University Bochum), Bill Dorland (University of Maryland, College Park) and Nuno Loureiro (Massachusetts Institute of Technology).

== Abstracting and indexing ==
The journal is abstracted and indexed in:

- Current Contents/Physical, Chemical & Earth Sciences
- EBSCO databases
- Ei Compendex
- Inspec
- ProQuest databases
- Science Citation Index Expanded
- Scopus

According to the Journal Citation Reports, the journal has a 2024 impact factor of 2.5.
