= Frascati Tokamak Upgrade =

Italian tokamak

Coordinates: 41.82372°N 12.66972°E

FTU
Frascati Tokamak Upgrade
- Device type: Tokamak
- Location: Frascati, Italy
- Affiliation: ENEA

Technical specifications
- Major radius: 0.935 m
- Minor radius: 0.30 m
- Plasma volume: 1.6 m^{3}
- Magnetic field: < 8 T
- Heating power: 9.2 MW RF
- Discharge duration: (1.7 s)
- Plasma current: < (1.6 MA)
- Plasma density: 4×10^{20} m^{−3}

History
- Year(s) of operation: 1989–present

The Frascati Tokamak Upgrade (FTU) is a tokamak operating at Frascati, Italy, under the ENEA fusion research program. Building on the Frascati Tokamak experiment, FTU is a compact, high-magnetic-field tokamak. The magnetic field on the axis of FTU's torus, created by its toroidal field coils, is 8 tesla. This is substantially higher than most magnetic confinement fusion devices, including the largest tokamaks ever built such as JET and TFTR, which have magnetic field strengths in the range of 3-5.5 T.

FTU began operation in 1990 and has since achieved operating goals of 1.6 MA at 8 T and average electron density greater than 4×10^{20} per cubic meter. The poloidal section of FTU is circular, with a limiter.

A similar small high-field tokamak in the USA was Alcator C-Mod at the Massachusetts Institute of Technology. Both experiments were cited as a basis for the IGNITOR tokamak proposal. Italian MIT professor Bruno Coppi worked on all three programs.
