= Caterina Riconda =

Italian physicist

Caterina Riconda is an Italian plasma physicist who works in France as a professor at Sorbonne University and researcher in the Laboratory for the Use of Intense Lasers. Riconda's research involves the theoretical, computational, and experimental study of laser-plasma interactions.

== Education and career ==
Riconda earned a laurea in physics (at the time, the Italian equivalent of a master's degree) from the University of Turin in 1991. She completed a Ph.D. in physics at the Massachusetts Institute of Technology in 1997. Her dissertation, Contained modes in inhomogeneous plasmas and their interaction with high energy particles, was supervised by Bruno Coppi.

She has worked in England at the Joint European Torus, and in France at the École polytechnique and CEA Paris-Saclay. She became a junior professor at the University of Bordeaux from 2003 to 2007. She moved to Pierre and Marie Curie University in 2007, and became a full professor there in 2016. Pierre and Marie Curie University became part of Sorbonne University in 2018, and she continues there as a professor.

== Recognition ==
Riconda was named as a Fellow of the American Physical Society in 2023, "for her fundamental contributions to plasma physics laser, plasma optics and collisionless shock, for training and inspiring students, particularly women, and for providing service to the international plasma physics community".
