= Alcator C-Mod =

Nuclear fusion research device at MIT, United States (1991–2016)

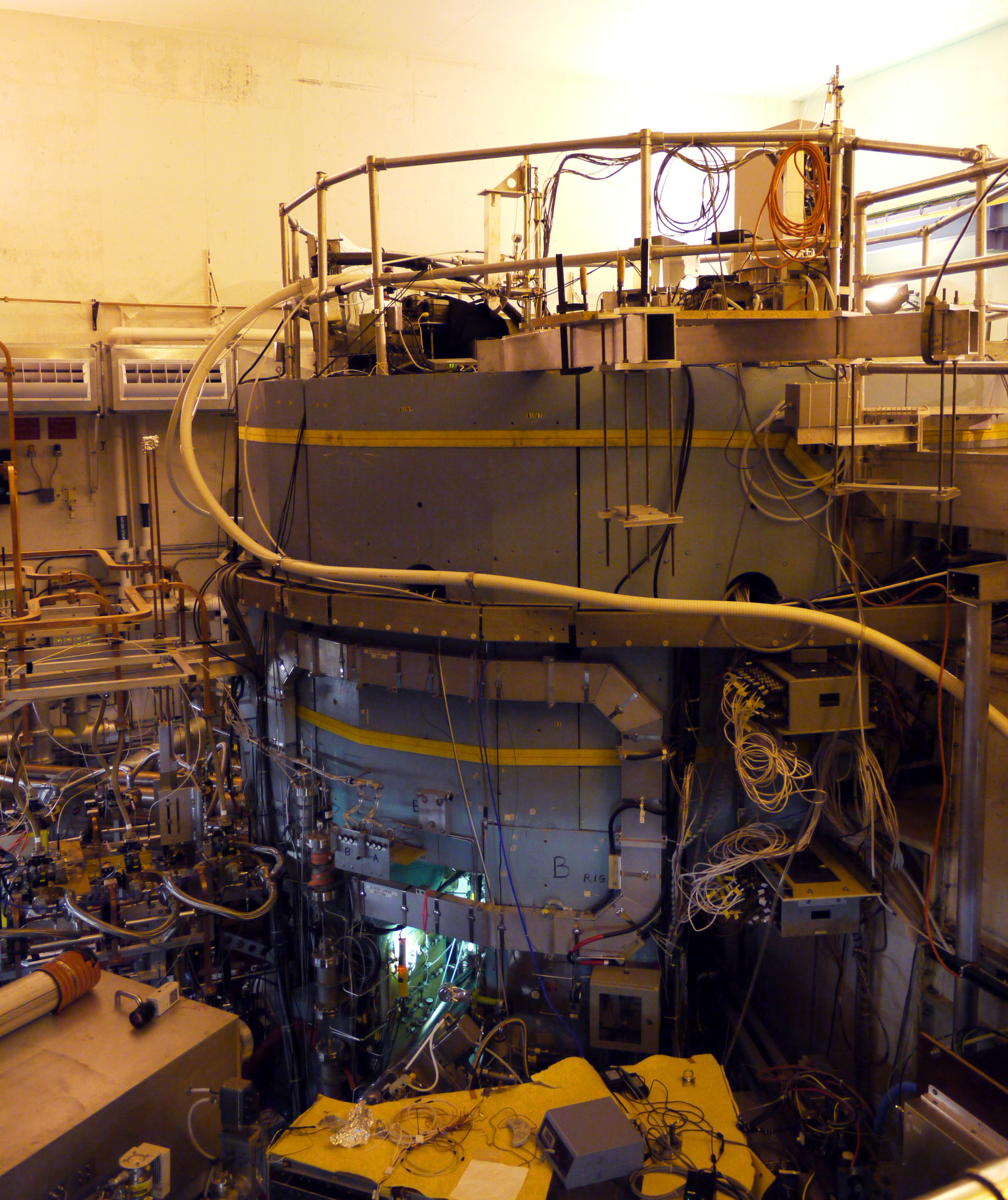
- The Alcator C-Mod tokamak experiment at the MIT Plasma Science and Fusion Center. Overview showing the device itself (under concrete shielding) and diagnostics in surrounding bay.
- Device type: Tokamak
- Location: Cambridge, Massachusetts, US
- Affiliation: MIT Plasma Science and Fusion Center

Technical specifications
- Major radius: 0.68 m (2 ft 3 in)
- Minor radius: 0.22 m (8.7 in)
- Plasma volume: 1 m^{3}
- Magnetic field: 3–8 T (30,000–80,000 G) (toroidal)
- Plasma current: 0.4–2.0 MA (typical)

History
- Year(s) of operation: 1991–2016
- Preceded by: Alcator C

Alcator C-Mod was a tokamak (a type of magnetically confined fusion device) that operated between 1991 and 2016 at the Massachusetts Institute of Technology (MIT) Plasma Science and Fusion Center (PSFC). Notable for its high toroidal magnetic field (of up to 8 tesla), Alcator C-Mod holds the world record for volume averaged plasma pressure in a magnetically confined fusion device. Until its shutdown in 2016, it was one of the major fusion research facilities in the United States.

Alcator C-Mod was the third of the Alcator (Alto Campo Toro, High Field Torus) tokamak series, following Alcator A (1973–1979) and Alcator C (1978–1987). It was the largest fusion reactor operated by any university and was an integral part of the larger Plasma Science and Fusion Center.

== History ==
=== Alcator A ===
In the late 1960s, magnetic-confinement fusion research at MIT was carried out on small-scale "table-top" experiments at the Research Laboratory for Electronics and the Francis Bitter Magnet Laboratory. At this time, the Soviet Union was developing a tokamak (though this was unknown in the United States), and Princeton Plasma Physics Laboratory (PPPL) was developing the stellarator.

Bruno Coppi was working at the Institute for Advanced Study in Princeton, New Jersey and was interested in the basic plasma physics problem of plasma resistivity at high values of the streaming parameter, as well as the behavior of magnetically confined plasmas at very high field strengths (≥ 10 T). In 1968, Coppi attended the third IAEA International Conference on Plasma Physics and Controlled Nuclear Fusion Research at Novosibirsk. At this conference, Soviet scientists announced that they had achieved electron temperatures of over 1000 eV in a tokamak device (T-3).

This same year, Coppi was named a full professor in the MIT Department of Physics. He immediately collaborated with engineers at the Francis Bitter Magnet Laboratory, led by Bruce Montgomery, to design a compact (0.54 m major radius), high-field (10 T on axis) tokamak which he titled Alcator. The name is an acronym of the Italian Alto Campo Toro, which means "high-field torus". With the later construction of Alcator C and then Alcator C-Mod, the original Alcator was retroactively renamed to Alcator A.

Alcator was approved by the Atomic Energy Commission (AEC) in 1970 and was first operated in 1972. Performance problems (poor-quality vacuum and arcing in toroidal field magnets) led to the rebuilding of the machine in 1973–1974 with a new vacuum vessel, with scientific results beginning in 1974. Alcator A was powered by the Bitter Laboratory's 32 MW DC motor-generators and was the first tokamak in the world to use an air-core transformer for ohmic current drive and heating.

=== Alcator B and C ===
The success of Alcator A led to the conceptual design, beginning in 1975, of a larger machine called Alcator B. However, the motor-generators used for Alcator A were not powerful enough to drive the new machine, necessitating the purchase and installation of new power supplies, a cost that the Energy Research and Development Administration (ERDA) was unwilling to fund. ERDA was, however, enthusiastic about building another Alcator, and a solution was found: a 225 MVA alternator was donated to MIT by Con Ed from a plant on the East River in New York City. The conceptual design was changed to accommodate the different power supply, and the project was renamed to Alcator C.

Alcator C was officially authorized in 1976. This same year, the Plasma Fusion Center (now the Plasma Science and Fusion Center) was spun off from the Francis Bitter Magnet Laboratory. Construction of Alcator C proceeded rapidly and initial tests were conducted at the end of 1977. The alternator arrived from Con Ed in early 1978 (its transport was complicated by the blizzard of 1978) and was incorporated into the system in the summer of 1978. Scientific operations began in September of that year.

Alcator C was a larger machine (R_{0} = 0.64 m) and operated at a higher field (B_{0} ≤ 13 T) than Alcator A. With the addition of 4 MW of lower hybrid heating in 1982, electron temperatures over 3.0 keV were reached. While Alcator C did not originally have the energy confinement time expected, due to the onset of ion temperature gradient turbulence at high values of $\eta = \text{d} \ln T / \text{d} \ln n$, pellet fueling was used to produce peaked density profiles and values of the nτ product of over 0.8 × 10^{20} s·m^{−3} were achieved in 1983.

=== Unfunded ideas and the C-Mod proposal ===
Several ideas for new devices and upgrades at the PSFC were never funded. From 1978 to 1980, a design activity was carried out for Alcator D, a larger version of Alcator C that would allow for more heating power, and possibly even deuterium–tritium (D–T) operation. This design was never formally proposed to the Department of Energy (DOE), but continued to evolve under Coppi's direction, eventually becoming the Italian–Russian IGNITOR device planned for construction at TRINITY near Troitsk, Russia.

In 1982, another more ambitious device called Alcator DCT was conceived. This machine would have superconducting coils producing 7 T on axis. 4 MW of lower hybrid current drive would drive a steady-state plasma with 1.4 MA plasma current. As this design was similar to the French Tore Supra, a joint French–American workshop was held in Cadarache in 1983 to compare the two designs and exchange ideas. Alcator DCT was formally proposed to the DOE in late 1983 but was not funded.

At that time, the budget for magnetic fusion energy research in the United States had been increasing year-over-year, reaching a peak of $468.4 million in fiscal 1984. That year, the PSFC was notified that for a time, budgets would be falling, and DOE policy would be to only fund upgrades to existing devices, not new machines. Thus, design work was begun on a copper-coil machine which would reuse some of the power supplies from Alcator C, allowing the team to pitch it as a "modification" to Alcator C. The conceptual design was completed and Alcator C-Mod was formally proposed to DOE in late 1985. The project was approved and construction was authorized in 1986.

== Characteristics ==
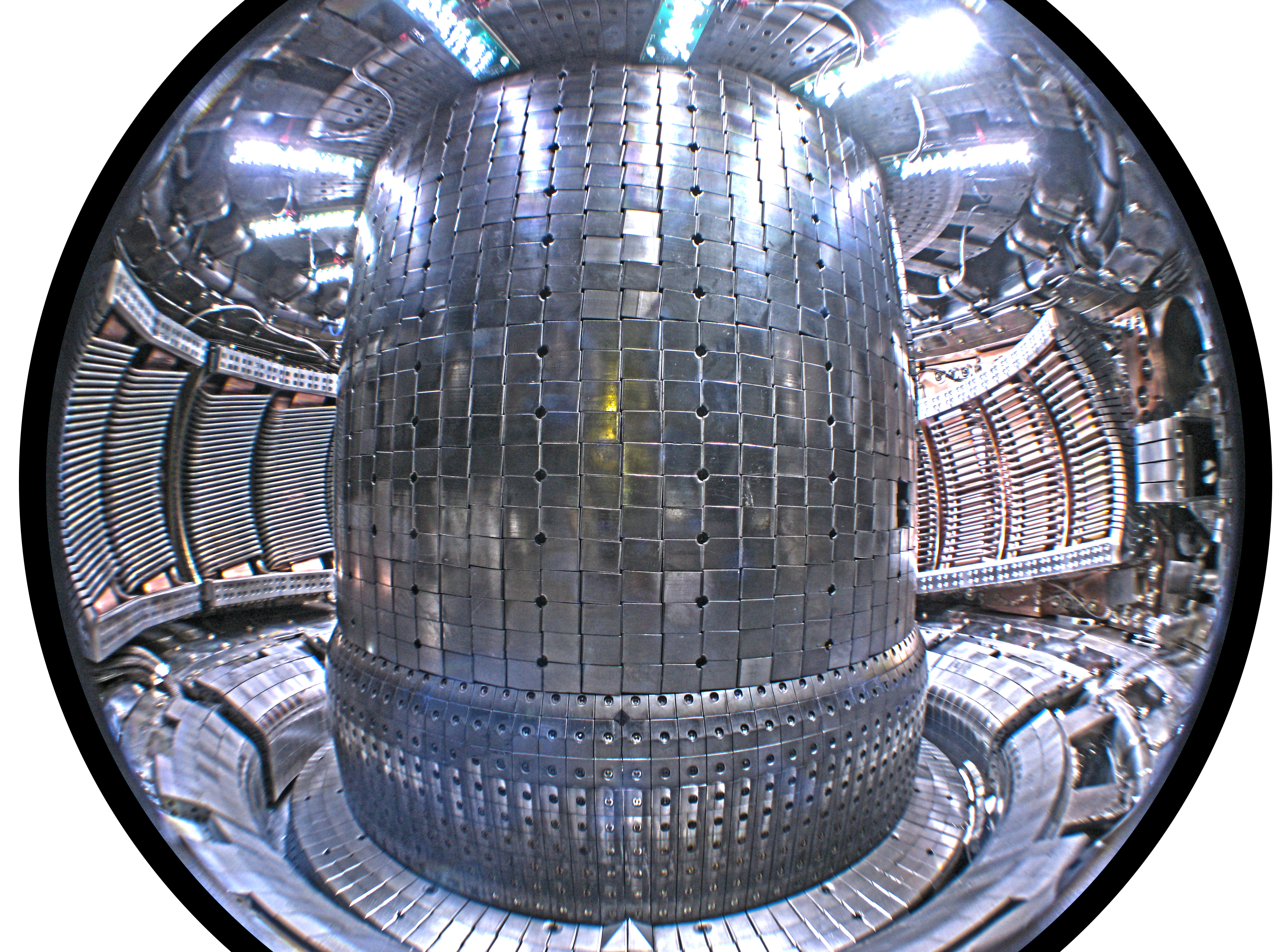
Interior view of the tokamak showing the molybdenum armor tiles on the wall. Three Ion Cyclotron Range of Frequencies (ICRF) heating antennas are visible – two on the left with two copper straps each, and the four-strap “field-aligned” antenna (installed 2011) at right.

=== Heating and current drive ===
Alcator C-Mod uses ion cyclotron radio frequency (ICRF) heating as its primary auxiliary heating source. The source frequency is 80 MHz and the standard minority heating scenarios are D(H) for 4.4–6.9 T and D(3He) for high field operation (7.3–8.0 T). A minority species (Hydrogen or He3) is indicated, and ICRH scenarios use a two-component plasma.

Absorption efficiency varies with the minority concentration. It is also possible to transition between minority and mode conversion (MC) heating by varying the minority species concentration. The relative H fraction $\eta_H = n_H/(n_H+n_D)$ can be scanned from roughly 2–30% via gas puffing and measured using passive charge exchange. The relative He3 fraction $\eta_{He3} = n_{He3}/n_e$ concentration can also be scanned from roughly 2–30% via gas puffing. Phase contrast imaging (PCI) can be used to measure the mode converted waves directly in the plasma.

==== Minority heating ====
Minority heating is the most common scenario used at C-Mod. The ICRF heating system operates at 80 MHz in D(H) plasmas. This frequency corresponds to on-axis minority fundamental cyclotron resonance of protons at 5.3 T and absorbing fast waves by hydrogen minority species in a deuterium plasma. It can be very efficient (typical single pass absorption in C-Mod is 80–90% for minority concentrations of 5–10%). Minority heating at 80 MHz and 7.9 T in a deuterium majority plasma is achieved using the He3 minority resonance (on-axis), but single pass absorption with He3 minority ions in deuterium tends to be much lower than for protons (e.g. the minority heating scenario at 5.3–5.4 T).

==== Mode conversion heating ====
Mode conversion of a fast magnetosonic wave to an ion cyclotron wave and ion Bernstein wave in the ion cyclotron range of frequencies (ICRF) can be used to heat electrons. Mode conversion heating is done at C-Mod using the ICRF in D(3He) plasmas.

==== Lower hybrid current drive ====
Lower hybrid current drive (LHCD) (based on Lower hybrid oscillation) is used to supplement the current driven by the Ohmic transformer. The LHCD system is capable of delivering 1.0+ MW of microwave power (planned upgrade to 2 MW or more with addition of a second antenna in 2013) to the plasma at 4.6 GHz. Power is provided by 250 kW klystron microwave amplifiers manufactured by CPI, Inc. Non-inductive operation for up to 0.5 s pulses at 500 kA was achieved. Lower hybrid waves are launched preferentially in the direction opposite the plasma current (i.e. in the direction of electron travel) and deposit energy on electrons moving at approximately three times the thermal velocity via Landau damping. A major area of LHCD research has been in the area of current drive at the high densities (n_{e} > 10^{20} m^{−3}) required for a fusion power plant.

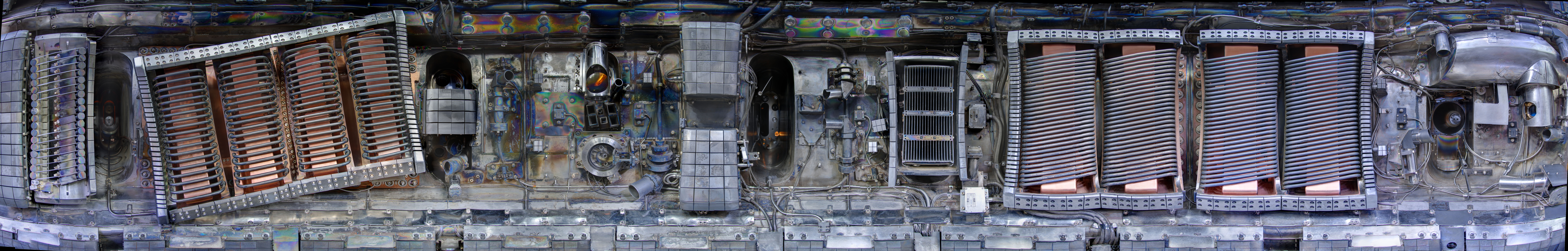
Panorama view of the tokamak outer wall stitched from 273 photos. The rotated ion-cyclotron frequency antenna with its four copper antenna straps can be seen on the left. The Lower Hybrid Launcher with its grid of small rectangular waveguides can be seen in the middle and the non-rotated Ion-Cyclotron frequency antennas are toward the right with four copper straps. The entrance for the neutral beam is the large circular hole near the right.

== 2013–2016: Final operations and shutdown ==
Alcator C-Mod was slated to shut down in October 2013. However, the 2014 Congressional omnibus spending bill explicitly specified operation of the experiment, providing $22 million. The experimental operation was restarted in February 2014.

Funding was once again extended for FY 2015, although the omnibus bill that provided the funding explicitly stated that no funding would be provided beyond FY 2016.

In 2016 Alcator C-Mod set a world record for plasma pressure in a magnetically confined fusion device, reaching 2.05 atmospheres – a 15 percent jump over the previous record of 1.77 atmospheres (also held by Alcator C-Mod). This record plasma had a temperature of 35 million degrees C, lasted for 2 seconds, and yielded 600 trillion fusion reactions. The run involved operation with a toroidal magnetic field of 5.7 tesla. It reached this milestone on its final day of operation.

Following completion of operations at the end of September 2016, the facility has been placed into safe shutdown, with no additional experiments planned at this time. There is a wealth of data archived from the more than 20 years of operations, and the experimental and theoretical teams continue to analyze the results and publish them in the scientific literature.

The Alcator C-Mod plasma pressure record of 2.05 atmosphere will likely hold for some time. The only machine currently under construction that is predicted to break this record is the ITER tokamak in France. ITER is not expected to be fully operational until 2034, meaning that Alcator C-Mod's record will hold for more than 15 years unless another new device is constructed before then.
