= MIT Plasma Science and Fusion Center =

Fusion research lab at MIT

Coordinates: 42°21′35.8″N 71°5′54.4″W

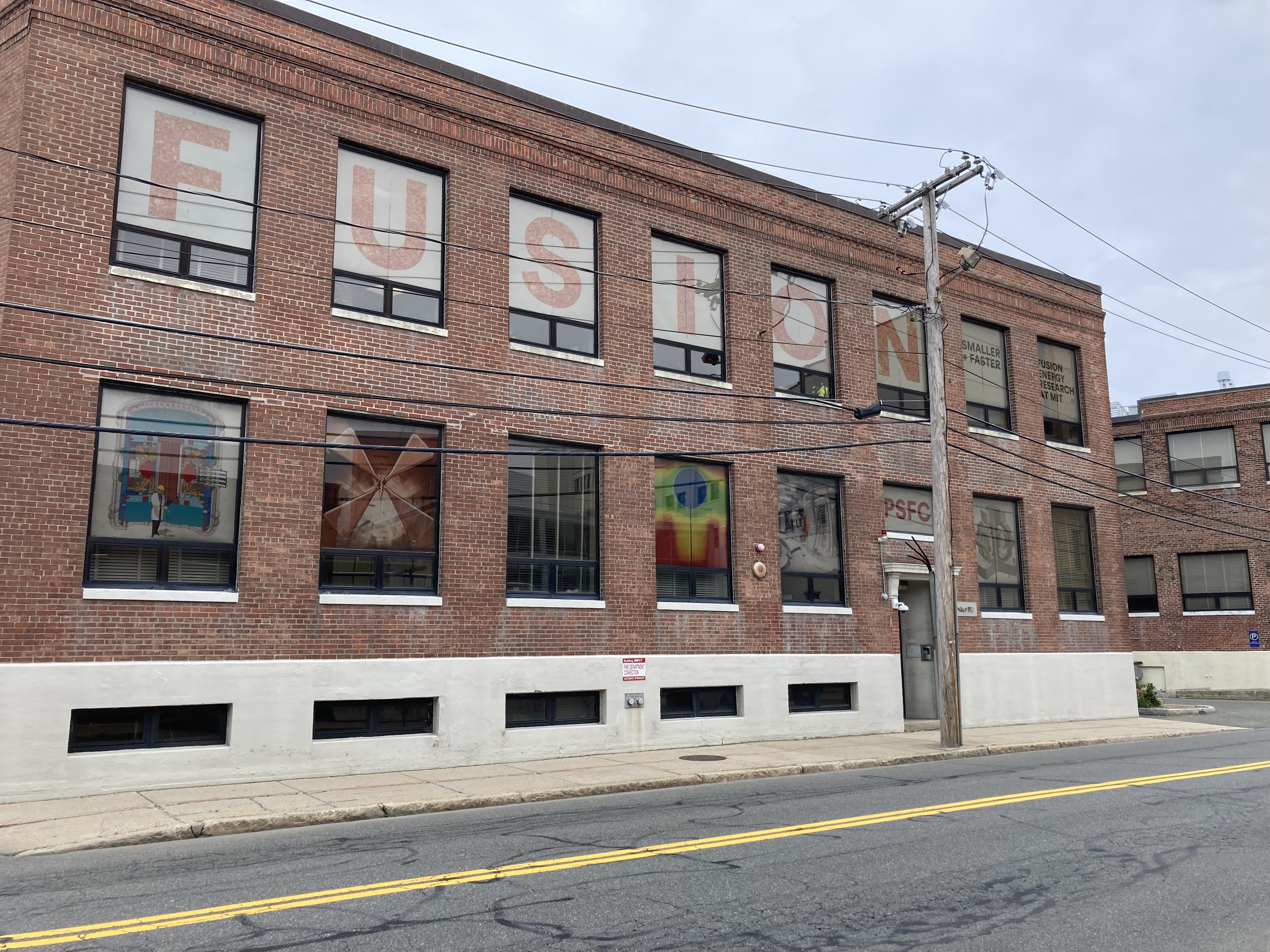
- PSFC at MIT building NW17
- Type: Research Center
- Established: 1976
- Director: Vacant
- Faculty: 16
- Location: Cambridge, Massachusetts, U.S.
- Website: Official website

The Plasma Science and Fusion Center (PSFC) at the Massachusetts Institute of Technology (MIT) is a university research center for the study of plasmas, fusion science and technology. It has more than 250 researchers, staff, and students across 7 labs, and is one of MIT's largest research labs.

It was originally founded in 1976 as the Plasma Fusion Center (PFC) at the request and with the collaboration of the U.S. Department of Energy. The original grant was for construction and operation of a tokamak reactor Alcator A, the first in a series of small, high-field tokamaks, followed by Alcator C (1978) and Alcator C-Mod (1993).

MIT's most recent tokamak, Alcator C-Mod, ran from 1993 to 2016. In 2016, the project pressure reached 2.05 atmospheres—a 15 percent jump over the previous record of 1.77 atmospheres with a plasma temperature of 35 million degrees C, sustaining fusion for 2 seconds, yielding 600 trillion fusion reactions. The run involved a 5.7 tesla magnetic field. It reached this milestone on its final day of operation.

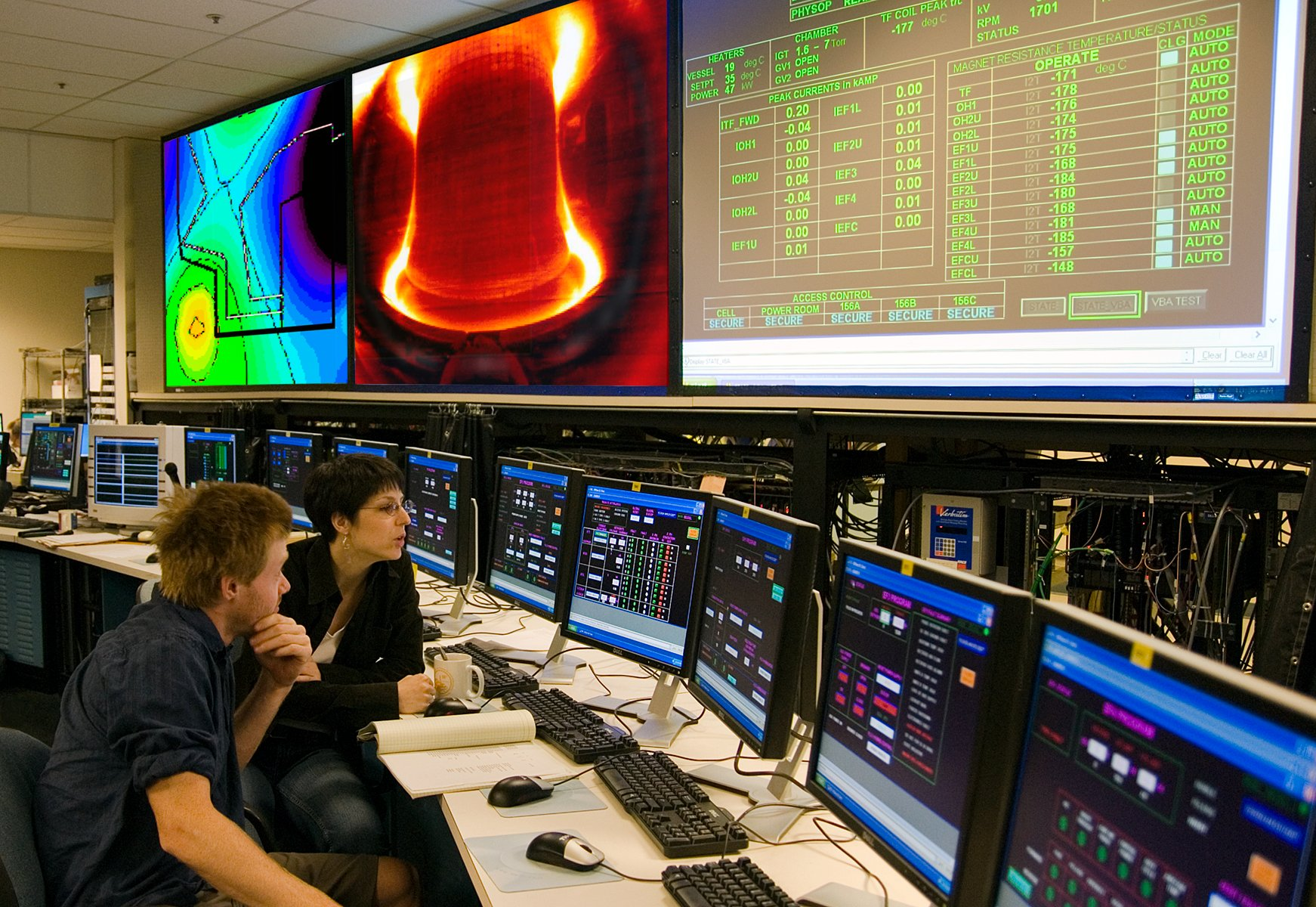
Control room of the Alcator C-Mod tokamak at the MIT Plasma Science and Fusion Center.

In 2018, the PSFC began developing a conceptual design for the SPARC tokamak in collaboration with Commonwealth Fusion Systems. SPARC intends to use new YBCO superconducting magnets in order to achieve net fusion energy in a compact device.

From August 18th to the 23rd, 2025, Plasma Science and Fusion Center (PSFC) hosted their sixth Computational Physics School for Fusion Research (CPS-FR) summer program; This program originally began in August 2019. The program was designed to help graduate students, post-doctorates, and researchers build, practice, and develop the skills to apply performance computing and data science tools to fusion energy research.

== Directors ==
No.	Director	Start	End	Notes
1	Ronald C. Davidson	1978	1988	First director of PSFC; later director of Princeton Plasma Physics Laboratory
2	Ronald R. Parker	1988	1992	Associate director of Plasma Fusion Center 1978-1988
3	Dieter Sigmar	1992	1995	Acting director
4	Miklos Porkolab	1995	2015	
5	Dennis G. Whyte	2015	2023	
6	Earl Marmar	2023	2024	Interim director
7	Nuno F. Loureiro	2024	2025	
8	Stephen Wukitch	2025		Interim director
