= Physics of Plasmas =

- Discipline: Plasma physics
- Language: English
- Edited by: Michael E. Mauel

Publication details
- History: 1994–present
- Publisher: American Institute of Physics (United States)
- Frequency: Monthly
- Impact factor: 2.5 (2025)

Standard abbreviations
- ISO 4: Phys. Plasmas

Indexing
- CODEN: PHPAEN
- ISSN: 1070-664X (print); 1089-7674 (web)

Links
- Journal homepage

Physics of Plasmas is a peer-reviewed monthly scientific journal on plasma physics published by the American Institute of Physics, with cooperation by the American Physical Society's Division of Plasma Physics, since 1994.

Until 1988, the journal topic was covered by Physics of Fluids. From 1989 until 1993, Physics of Fluids was split into Physics of Fluids A covering fluid dynamics and Physics of Fluids B dedicated to plasma physics. In 1994, Physics of Plasmas was split off as a separate journal.
