= List of fellows of the American Physical Society (1972–1997) =

The American Physical Society honors members with the designation Fellow for having made significant accomplishments to the field of physics.

The following list includes those fellows honored from 1972 through 1997.

== 1972 ==
- Earnest D. Adams
- Peter D. Adams
- David Adler
- Robert S. Allgaier
- John C. Allred
- Charles H. Anderson
- Sam M. Austin
- Robert W. Balluffi
- Gene A. Baraff
- Elizabeth U. Baranger
- Benjamin Frank Bayman
- Barry L. Berman
- Charles K. Birdsall
- Marshall Blann
- Hale van Dorn Bradt
- William F. Brinkman
- R. Brian Cairns
- A. G. W. Cameron
- Moshe Carmeli
- Thomas D. Carr
- John W. Clarck
- Sidney R. Coleman
- Carl B. Collins
- Peter J. Csavinszky
- Orlie L. Cutris
- William B. Daniels
- Sydney G. Davidson
- Harold L. Davis
- Peter T. Demos
- Richard M. Diamon
- Bertram G. Dick
- John O. Dimmock
- Mildred S. Dresselhaus
- Andrew H. Eschenfelder
- Stavros Fallieros
- Michael Ference
- Joel H. Ferziger
- Alexander L. Fetter
- Peter Fisher
- Gerald T. Garvey
- Raffaele R. Gatto
- Marvin W. Gettner
- Peter G. Gibbs
- M. Alten Gilleo
- Roy Jay Glauber
- Joshua N. Goldberg
- William W. Graessley
- Kenneth R. Greider
- David S. Guralnik
- Edith C. Halbert
- Bertrand I. Halperin
- Donald R. Hamann
- Edward R. Harrison
- Michael J. Harrison
- Howard R. Hart
- Paul L. Hartman
- Leon Heller
- Charles H. Henry
- Rolfe H. Herber
- Pierre C. Hohenberg
- Donald F. Holcomb
- Nick Holonyak
- Henry O. Hooper
- John C. Hopkins
- Paul S. Hubbard
- John P. Hummel
- Arthur M. Jaffe
- Joachim W. Janecke
- Leo F. Johnson
- David L. Judd
- Wolfgang Kaiser
- Larry Kevan
- Edward A. Knapp
- Daniel S. Koltun
- Jan Korringa
- Herbert Kroemer
- John A. Kuehner
- Richard L. Lander
- Dietrich W. J. Langer
- Linwood L. Lee
- James E. Leiss
- David W. G. S. Leith
- Howard B. Levine
- Richard L. Liboff
- Allan J. Litchenberg
- John L. Lundberg
- Fritz Luty
- David W. Lynch
- Bruce H. Mahan
- Jagadishwar Mahanty
- Bernard Margolis
- Harvey Marshak
- James W. Mayer
- Kirk W. McVoy
- Denis B. McWhan
- Norman Menyuk
- Walter J. Merz
- Robert L. Mieher
- Douglas L. Mills
- Asoke N. Mitra
- Cornelius F. Moore
- Ezra T. Newman
- Sven G. Nilsson
- James R. Nix
- Kenneth L. Nordtvedt
- Leonard J. Nugent
- Morton B. Panish
- Earl R. Parker
- Peter D. Parker
- Roger B. Perkins
- E. Gale Pewitt
- Robert Otto Pohl
- Gerald L. Pollack
- Peter M. Rentzepis
- John D. Reppy
- Richard E. Robertson
- Donald Robson
- George L. Rogosa
- Ernest S. Rost
- Lawrence G. Rubin
- Arthur L. Ruoff
- Chih-Tang Sah
- Myriam P. Sarachik
- Leo Sartori
- Paul W. Schmidt
- Thomas A. Scott
- Donald Secrest
- Israel R. Senitzky
- Andrew M. Sessler
- Kamal K. Seth
- Carl M. Shakin
- Benjamin Shih-Ping Shen
- Yuen Ron Shen
- J. Ely Shrauner
- Rolf H. Siemssen
- Robert H. Silsbee
- Harold P. Smith
- Lawrence C. Snyder
- William G. Spitzer
- William A. Steyert
- Myron Strongin
- Wilard L. Talbert
- Igal Talmi
- Barry N. Taylor
- Donald O. Thompson
- Rudolf E. Thun
- Reuben Title
- Robert Vandenbosch
- Antole B. Volkov
- Hans A. Weidenmuller
- Robert E. Welsh
- Raymond Wolfe
- George B. Wright

== 1973 ==
- Richard A. Arndt
- Inder Paul Batra
- Milton Birnbaum
- Frederick W. Byron
- Nathaniel P. Carleton
- Thomas A. Carlson
- David E. Cox
- Stuart J. P. Crampton
- Langdon T. Crane
- Paul H. Cutler
- Cécile DeWitt-Morette
- Robert A. Dory
- Peder J. Z. Estrup
- John S. Faulkner
- Ervin J. Fenyves
- Kenneth J. Foley
- Victor Franco
- John D. Gavenda
- Hyatt M. Gibbs
- Kurt Gottfried
- Tetsuo Hadeishi
- John L. Hall
- Theodor W. Hansch
- Kenneth J. Harker
- Wynford L. Harries
- Arvid Herzenberg
- David A. Hill
- Keith B. Jefferts
- Myron A. Jeppesen
- Milton N. Kabler
- Quentin C. Kessel
- Lee J. Kieffer
- Thomas A. Kitchens
- Paul W. Kruse
- Neal F. Lane
- Marshall Lapp
- William C. Lineberger
- William A. Love
- Charles A. McDowell
- Eion G. McRae
- Ralph M. Moon
- David A. Moroi
- Kazem Omidvar
- Istvan Ozsvath
- Donald J. Plazek
- G. Wilhelm Raith
- Howard R. Reiss
- Thomas M. Rice
- Arthur Rich
- Hugh G. Robinson
- Leon D. Roper
- Manuel Rotenberg
- Richard H. Sands
- Richard I. Schoen
- Ivan A. Sellin
- Stephen M. Shafroth
- John R. Sheridan
- Charles E. Siewert
- Marvin Silver
- Albert Silverman
- Richart E. Slusher
- Earl W. Smith
- Winthrop W. Smith
- Mary Beth Stearns
- Michael E. Sturge
- Edward W. Thomas
- John S. Thomsen
- Walter W. Wada
- Samuel A. Werner
- Charles B. Wharton
- William W. Williams
- Jens C. Zorn

== 1974 ==
- Raymond G. Ammar
- Elemer E. Anderson
- Robert J. Birgeneau
- Frank A. Bovey
- Louis Brown
- William M. Bugg
- Praveen Chaudhari
- Loucas G. Christophorou
- Robert D. Cowan
- Russell W. Dreyfus
- Lawrence W. Fagg
- Alan J. Faller
- Frederick C. Fehsenfeld
- Richard W. Fink
- H. Terry Fortune
- Richard B. Frankel
- Eugene Goldberg
- David M. Golden
- Arthur C. Gossard
- David J. Gross
- Stephen E. Harris
- Duane H. Jaecks
- Mark J. Jakobson
- Allen I. Janis
- Kenneth A. Johnson
- Frank C. Jones
- Frank E. Karasz
- John S. King
- Henry Kressel
- Melvin Leon
- Peter Lindenfeld
- Irving J. Lowe
- Edgar Luscher
- Gerald D. Mahan
- Joseph B. McGrory
- Joseph B. Meservey
- Wiliam Mims
- John T. Park
- Jan A. Rajchman
- Allen B. Robbins
- Russell L. Robinson
- Brian B. Schwartz
- Yaacov Shapira
- George W. Smith
- H. Eugene Stanley
- Jerome D. Swalen
- William P. Trower
- Chang C. Tsuei
- William M. Visscher
- James T. Waber
- Russell P. Walstedt
- Larry Zamick
- Jaap H. deLeeuw

== 1975 ==
- Frank J. Adrian
- Robert R. Alfano
- Kinsey A. Anderson
- Paul A. Bagus
- Jack Bass
- Curtis E. Bemis
- Edmond Louis Berger
- Arno Bohm
- Merwyn B. Brodsky
- Ronald A. Bryan
- Joseph I. Budnick
- Charles A. Burrus
- Vittorio Celli
- Richard K. Chang
- Sow-Hsin Chen
- Elihu L. Chupp
- Thomas L. Cline
- Roger W. Cohen
- Thomas C. Collins
- Alvin W. Czanderna
- Hugh E. DeWitt
- James A. Earl
- Eugene Eichler
- Donald E. Ellis
- Raymond C. Elton
- Harold P. Eubank
- Leonard J. Eyges
- Chang-Yun Fan
- Giovanni G. Fazio
- James E. Felten
- Carl E. Fitchel
- Paul A. Fluery
- Moises Garcia-Munoz
- Carl H. Gibson
- Hilton F. Glavish
- Walter B. Goad
- Vitalii I. Gol'danskii
- Walter I. Goldburg
- Paul Gorenstein
- Hiram Hart
- Akira Hasegawa
- Albert J. Hatch
- Harry H. Heckman
- Ronald J. W. Henry
- Herbert N. Hersh
- Maurice Holt
- Frederic Holtzberg
- Franklin Hutchinson
- James S. Hyde
- Lloyd G. Hyman
- Robert Jaklevic
- Charles S. Johnson
- Jack R. Jokippi
- Franco P. Jona
- Clifford K. Jones
- Richard I. Joseph
- Prabahan K. Kabir
- Ivan P. Kaminow
- Paul L. Kelley
- Anne Kernan
- Freddy A. Khoury
- Clyde W. Kimball
- Toshimoto Kushida
- Jacques J. L'Heureux
- David M. Larsen
- Marcel A. R. LeBlanc
- Kenneth Lee
- Gilda H. Loew
- Bogdan C. Maglich
- Humphrey J. Maris
- Tony Maxworthy
- Gilbert D. Mead
- Charles J. Meechan
- Andre P. H. Mercier
- Arthur G. Milnes
- Simon C. Moss
- Michael M. Nieto
- Lee C. Northcliffe
- James M. O'Reilly
- Arno Allan Penzias
- Norman L. Peterson
- Thomas G. Phillips
- Benjamin Post
- Cedric J. Powell
- Richard H. Pratt
- Erling Pytte
- Reuven Ramaty
- Roy E. Rand
- Joseph P. Remeika
- James J. Rhyne
- Remo Ruffini
- Rolf P. Scharenberg
- George Schmidt
- David N. Schramm
- Nathan Seeman
- George W. Series
- Irwin I. Shapiro
- David H. Sharp
- Howard W. Shields
- Juda L. Shohet
- Rein Silberberg
- Sam M. Silverman
- Ronald F. Stebbings
- Edward C. Stone
- Bergen R. Suydam
- Robert J. Swenson
- Chung L. Tang
- Jan Tauc
- Louis R. Testardi
- James E. Turner
- James A. Van Vechten
- Kuppuswamy Vedam
- Satya Dev Verma
- Rochus E. Vogt
- Sten von Friesen
- William C. Walker
- Watt W. Webb
- William R. Webber
- Johannes Weertman
- Lodewyk Woltjer
- Chia-Wei Woo
- Robert A. Young
- Robert W. Zurmuhle

== 1976 ==
- Farid F. Abraham
- Andreas C. Albrecht
- Neil W. Ashcroft
- Ronald A. Aziz
- James N. Bardsley
- Olof Beckman
- Robert J. Bell
- Eugene M. Bernstein
- M. L. Bhaumik
- Robert D. Birkhoff
- J. Bernard Blake
- Leroy N. Blumberg
- Richard J. Borg
- Jay P. Boris
- Marc H. Brodsky
- Laurence James Cahill
- Ngee-Pong Chang
- Shau-Jin Chang
- Ernest Coleman
- Homer E. Conzett
- Terrill A. Cool
- Bruno Coppi
- Basil Curnutte
- Ernest R. Davidson
- Peter G. Debrunner
- Adrian M. Degraaf
- Mauro DiDomenico
- Carl B. Dover
- John D. Dow
- Richard M. Drisko
- Shakti P. Duggal
- Robert A. Ellis
- Victor J. Emery
- Robert N. Euwema
- James L. C. Ford
- Jack H. Freed
- Riccardo Giacconi
- Roy G. Gordon
- Robert J. Gould
- Bernhard Gross
- Einar Hinnov
- Rodney T. Hodgson
- Daniel J. Horen
- John N. Howard
- George S. Janes
- Lawrence W. Jones
- William D. Jones
- Terry Kammash
- Gordon L. Kane
- J. Lawrence Katz
- Edwin M. Kellogg
- Daniel Kivelson
- Alan C. Kolb
- Sonja Krause
- Alan D. Krisch
- Albert B. Kunz
- Peter D. Kunz
- Tzee-Ke Kuo
- David P. Landau
- Jerome B. Lando
- Louis J. Lanzerotti
- Victor W. Laurie
- Yong Yung Lee
- Yuan Tseh Lee
- John C. Light
- Liu Liu
- James D. Livingston
- John A. Lockwood
- Michael J. Longo
- Gerald Lucovsky
- William J. Macknight
- John L. Magee
- John Lee Margrave
- James E. Mark
- David F. Measday
- Robert L. Melcher
- Donald I. Meyer
- David A. Micha
- Alexandru Mihul
- Robert A. Moline
- Charles Bradley Moore
- Robert S. Moore
- Harry Elecks Moses
- Ralph W. Nicholls
- Robert Merle Nicklow
- Vivian O'Brien
- James S. O'Connell
- Grover D. O'Kelley
- Nils Yngve Ohrn
- Oliver E. Overseth
- Heinz Rudolph Pagels
- Sandip Pakvasa
- Howard B. Palmer
- Yoon S. Park
- Raj K. Pathria
- Francis W. Perkins
- Sarah E. Petrie
- Miklos Porkolab
- Arthur M. Poskanzer
- Dusan Ciril Prevorsek
- Byron P. Roe
- Paul H. Rutherford
- Myron B. Salamon
- George A. Samara
- Alois W. Schardt
- Frank Scherb
- Irwin Schneider
- Milos Seidl
- Donald W. Setser
- Frederick D. Seward
- Ramy A. Shanny
- Arden Sher
- David Arthur Shirley
- S. Shtrikman
- John Silcox
- Kundan Singwi
- Gabor A. Somorjai
- Brian M. Spicer
- Harvey J. Stapleton
- George Stell
- Sanford Samuel Sternstein
- Herbert L. Strauss
- Bradford Sturtevant
- Yoshio Tanaka
- Ignacio Tinoco
- T Laurence Trueman
- Donald O. Van Ostenburg
- John C. Vandervale
- Yatendra P. Varshni
- Hans Christian von Baeyer
- James C. Walker
- Harold Weinstock
- John A. White
- John M. Wilcox
- Wendell S. Williams
- Michael Wortis
- Fa Yueh Wu
- Richard Henry Zallen
- Richard A. Zdanis

== 1977 ==
- Roshan L. Aggarwal
- Stanley E. Babb
- Robert Z. Bachrach
- Vernon D. Barger
- Ralph H. Bartram
- Bruce J. Berne
- Robert Betchov
- John E. Bjorkholm
- Lynn A. Boatner
- Jill C. Bonner
- Stephen G. Brush
- Robert L. Burman
- Moustafa T. Chahine
- Yok Chen
- John F. Clarke
- Robert N. Compton
- Ronald C. Davidson
- Jacques Denavit
- Jay R. Dorfman
- Dieter Drechsel
- David Emin
- Horacio A. Farach
- David K. Ferry
- William A. Fitzsimmons
- Edward R. Flynn
- Alan C. Gallagher
- Joel I. Gersten
- Alfred S. Goldhaber
- Martin Gouterman
- Malcolm Harvey
- Karl T. Hecht
- Lucien Henry
- Helen K. Holt
- David A. Jenkins
- Charles J. Joachain
- Egbert Kankeleit
- James L. Kassner
- Yeong Ell Kim
- Richard H. Kropschot
- Jacob J. Leventhal
- Nunzio O. Lipari
- Frank J. Loeffler
- James R. Macdonald
- Peter Mark
- Robert L. McGrath
- Jasper D. Memory
- A. W. Kenneth Metzner
- Marian Mięsowicz
- Richard E. Mischke
- Richard L. Morse
- Forrest S. Mozer
- Frederick M. Mueller
- Sang Boo Nam
- Ali H. Nayfeh
- Michael J. Newman
- Roy H. Neynaber
- Norman E. Phillips
- Martin Pope
- Hernan C. Praddaude
- Peter M. Richards
- Leonard Rosenberg
- Fred D. Rosi
- Henry F. Schaefer
- Michael Schulz
- Marlon O. Scully
- David J. Sellmyer
- Jan V. Sengers
- Lu Jeu Sham
- Yogendra N. Srivastava
- Harry L. Swinney
- Peter Thieberger
- Sandor Trajmar
- Arnold Tubis
- Arunachala Viswanathan
- Jack H. Wernick
- James F. Williams
- Chun Wa Wong
- William M. Yen

== 1978 ==
- Eric G. Adelberger
- Yakir Aharonov
- Joel Alan Appelbaum
- R Edward Barker
- Peter D. Barnes
- James Edward Bayfield
- Alan J. Bearden
- Walter Benenson
- Aron M. Bernstein
- William Bertozzi
- George F. Bertsch
- John M. Blakely
- David L. Book
- James Alan Borders
- Raymond F. Boyer
- James D. Callen
- Ching-Wu Chu
- Milton Walter Cole
- Stephen H. Davis
- Bipin Ratital Desai
- Thomas F. Deutsch
- Donald F. DuBois
- Joseph H. Eberly
- Lewis R. B. Elton
- John R. Erskine
- Thomas E. Feuchtwang
- Edward Norval Fortson
- Frank Y. Fradin
- Robert S. Freund
- Fred R. Gamble
- Jose Dolores Garcia
- Rathindra N. Ghoshtagore
- Marvin D. Girardeau
- George W. Greenlees
- Reginald C. Greenwood
- Fred Bassett Hagedorn
- Kurt Haller
- Charles B. Harris
- Alexander L. Harvey
- Richard G. Helmer
- William M. Hooke
- Earl K. Hyde
- Andrew D. Jackson
- Derek Jackson
- Richard Calvin Jarnagin
- Donald Rex Johnson
- Noah R Johnson
- K. Kang
- Posey W. Keaton
- Charles F. Kennel
- Daniel Kleppner
- William Leo Kruer
- Norton D. Lang
- Morton Mandel
- Richard Marrus
- Pran Nath
- John W Negele
- Gerald G. Ohlsen
- Gayle S. Painter
- Alexander Pines
- Jacobo Rapaport
- John R. Sabin
- E. Brooks Shera
- Frank S. Stephens
- Paul M. Tedrow
- John B. Wachtman
- George D. Whitfield
- Cheuk-Yin Wong
- Richard K. Yamamoto
- Gisbert Zuputlitz
- Jorrit de Boer

== 1979 ==
- David P. Balamuth
- Hall L. Crannell
- Hendrik De Waard
- P. M. Endt
- Martin R. Flannery
- Robert W. Hendricks
- F. Iachello
- Wilfrid Basil Mann
- S. T. Manson
- Gary Earl Mitchell
- Denis L. Rousseau
- Paul C. Simms
- Vlado Valkovic
- A. Van Der Woude
- G. Walker

== 1980 ==
- John J. Aklonis
- Daniel Albritton
- Barry J. Allen
- William B. Ard
- Lloyd Armstrong
- Louis A. P. Balazs
- Malcolm R. Beasley
- Henry G. Berry
- J. Robert Beyster
- Thomas J. Birmingham
- Lesser Blum
- Stephen E. Bodner
- Kees Bol
- Richard H. Boyd
- Howard C. Bryant
- Cyrus D. Cantrell
- D. Duane Carmony
- Steve H. Carpenter
- Robert J. Celotta
- Yau-Wa Chan
- Wendell K. Chen
- Tsu-Kai Chu
- Charles L. Cocke
- Timothy Coffey
- Donald Coles
- John W. D. Connolly
- Stuart L. Cooper
- Alexander Dalgarno
- Kenneth T.R. Davies
- Daniel L. Decker
- Joseph L. Dehmer
- John M. Deutch
- Robert L. Dewar
- Dirck L. Dimock
- Robert L. Dimock
- Paul Dimotakis
- Richard J. Drachman
- Errol P. Eernisse
- Kent G. Estabrook
- Robert W. Field
- David W. Forslund
- Thomas F. Gallagher
- George Gamota
- Brange Golding
- Richard L. Greene
- Charles C. Grimes
- Steven M. Grimes
- Hermann A. Grunder
- Donald U. Gubser
- Herman W. Hoerlin
- Hiroyuki Ikezi
- Muhammad M. Islam
- Theodore A. Jacobs
- Fred M. Johnson
- Robert A. Johnson
- Michio Kaku
- Christos A. Kapetanakos
- Predhiman K. Kaw
- Larkin Kerwin
- Yong-Ki Kim
- James L. Kinsey
- Edward S. Kirkpatrick
- Norman C. Koon
- Steven E. Koonin
- Max G. Lagally
- Robert B. Laibowitz
- Gerard H. Lander
- Allan B. Langdon
- Roman Laubert
- Edward Prentiss Lee
- Jack R. Leibowitz
- Aaron Lewis
- James Chen-Min Li
- Michael A. Lieberman
- Morton Litt
- Chuan-Sheng Liu
- Karl E. Lonngren
- Wallace M. Manheimer
- Alfred W. Maschke
- Frederick J. Mayer
- Joseph Meixner
- Luke Wei Mo
- Jack M. Mochel
- Rabindra N. Mohapatra
- Mark Morkovin
- David Mosher
- Karl A. Muller
- John F. Nagle
- David W. Norcross
- Sokrates T. Pantelides
- Konstantinos Papadopulos
- Dimitrios A. Papconstantopoulos
- Vithalbhai L. Patel
- Robert M. Pearlstein
- Robert Pecora
- Perry A. Penz
- Franz Plasil
- Robert T. Poe
- Gerald C. Pomraning
- Carl Hugo Poppe
- Mark A. Ratner
- William P. Reinhardt
- Barrett H. Ripin
- Anthony Robson
- Ryong-Joon Roe
- Anatol Roshko
- Jonathan L. Rosner
- Erhard W. Rothe
- Theodore Rowland
- David A. Russell
- Jacob Schaefer
- Hugo V. Schmidt
- John T. Schriempf
- David K. Scott
- Robert J. Silbey
- Earl F. Skelton
- Neville V. Smith
- Julien Clinton Sprott
- Anthony F. Starace
- Robert L. Sugar
- Robert J. Taylor
- Eric D. Thompson
- Samuel B. Trickey
- Raphael Tsu
- R.J. Von Gutfeld
- Nobuyoshi Wakabayashi
- William Warren
- Robert M. White
- Marvin H. Wilkening
- Arthur R. Williams
- James P. Wolfe
- Dave H. Youngblood
- James F. Ziegler

== 1981 ==
- Sidney Cyril Abrahams
- Andreas Acrivos
- Girish Saran Agarwal
- Edward T. Arakawa
- Don Alton Baker
- Myron Bander
- Michel L. Barat
- Bruce M. Barker
- Ray H. Baughman
- Fred Edmond Bertrand
- Aaron N. Bloch
- John Brayton Bronzan
- Donald Maxwell Burland
- Friedrich H. Bussee
- Frank Paul Calaprice
- Richard F. Casten
- Liu Chen
- Tsu-Teh Chou
- Norman H. Christ
- Paul H. Citrin
- Douglas Cline
- John Gillette Curro
- Marian Danysz
- William Ross Datars
- Ralph De Vries
- Joseph E. Demuth
- Frank S. Dietrich
- Francis Joseph Disalvo
- Gerald Dolling
- Robert C. Dynes
- Peter Michael Eisenberger
- Roger James Elliott
- Arthur Joseph Epstein
- Michael David Fayer
- Peter Julian Feibelman
- Gian Pero Felcher
- Leonard C. Feldman
- Alexander Firestone
- Paul Howard Frampton
- John Williams Gadzuk
- Nicholas E. Geacintov
- Amal K. Ghosh
- Jonathan I. Gittleman
- George C. Goldenbaum
- Victor Lawrence Granatstein
- Thomas J. Greytak
- Robert Bruce Hallock
- J. E. Hammel
- David Andrew Hammer
- Joachim Jacques Hauser
- Richard Heinz
- Walter F. Henning
- Noah Hershkowitz
- Akir Hirose
- John T. Hogan
- Paul M. Horn
- Bernardo A. Huberman
- Walter R. Johnson
- Lorella M. Jones
- Brian Raymond Judd
- Marc Aaron Kastner
- Denis Keefe
- Robert E. Kelly
- George A. Keyworth
- Kenneth L. Kliewer
- Martin Lampe
- David Chapman Langreth
- David Morris Lee
- Yee-Chun Lee
- Elliott Charles Levinthal
- Harold Ralph Lewis
- Erwin Felix Lewy-Bertaut
- James David Litster
- Helmut K. V. Lotsch
- James V. Maher
- Kazumi Maki
- Willem Van Rensselaer Malkus
- Claire Allen Max
- Bruce Douglas McCombe
- Thomas Conley McGill
- George Hunter Miley
- Ralph Wayne Moir
- George John Morales
- Asokendu Mozumder
- Venkatesh Narayanamurti
- John Arthur Nation
- Thomas Sherman Noggle
- Steven Alan Orszag
- Douglas Dean Osheroff
- Edward Ott
- Ronald Richard Parker
- Gary David Patterson
- Peter Paul
- Wiliam Marchant Prest
- Manfred J. Raether
- Robert Colemane Richardson
- Nathan Russell Roberson
- James A. Rome
- Nicholas Rott
- John Sheffield
- John A. Schmidt
- Barry Martin Simon
- John Robert Smith
- Phillip Allen Sprangle
- Michael John Stephen
- Robert G. Stokstad
- Szymon Suckewer
- Howard S. Taylor
- Gordon Albert Thomas
- Keith Irvin Thomassen
- Arthur H. Thompson
- Jay Tittman
- Robert E. Tribble
- Chandra Mohan Varma
- George A. Victor
- Daniel Frank Walls
- Jon Carleton Weisheit
- Harold Weitzner
- Roscoe B. White
- Samuel J. Williamson
- Niels Karl Winsor
- Giuseppe Zerbi
- John Jacob de Swart

== 1982 ==
- Thomas K. Alexander
- Gianni Ascarelli
- G. Franco Bassani
- Clayton W. Bates
- David R. Bates
- Gerardo Beni
- Rameshwar W. Bhargava
- Stephen G. Bishop
- Peter D. Bond
- Russell A. Bonham
- Allen H. Boozer
- Jeremiah U. Brackbill
- Virginia R. Brown
- Ray A. Burnstein
- Nina Byers
- Stephen H. Carr
- David Chandler
- Chung Yun Chang
- David Bing Jue Chang
- Leroy L. Chang
- Ta-Pei Cheng
- John R. Clem
- Robert William Conn
- William S. Cooper
- Eric L. E. Courtens
- John M. Crissman
- Ronald Yvon Cusson
- Richard C. DiPrima
- Joseph W. Doane
- John J. Dorning
- Alexander J. Dragt
- Jean Durup
- David L. Ederer
- Kenneth W. Ehlers
- Fred Henry Eisen
- Frank F. Fang
- Judith R. Franz
- Karl F. Freed
- Richard R. Freeman
- Jeffrey P. Freidberg
- Nelson S. Gillis
- Charles M. Glashausser
- Robert G. Glasser
- George Gloecker
- William A. Goddard
- Martin V. Goldman
- Howard A. Gordon
- Robert A. Graham
- Brian C. Gregory
- Daniel R. Grischkowsky
- Warren D. Grobman
- Charles Chih-Chao Han
- Thomas Joseph Hanratty
- Logan E. Hargrove
- Robert W. Hellwarth
- Anne Hiltner
- Roald Hoffmann
- Edwin B. Hooper, Jr
- Jack E. Houston
- Robert C. Hughes
- E. Atlee Jackson
- Sitaram S. Jaswal
- Carson D. Jeffries
- Roy R. Johnson
- Jiri Jonas
- George R. Kalbfleisch
- Paul Jesse Kellogg
- Raymond G. Kepler
- Hee Joong Kim
- Yong Wook Kim
- Charles M. Knobler
- John B. Kogut
- George T. Kokotailo
- Victor Korenman
- Edward J. Kramer
- Magne Kristiansen
- Ryogo Kubo
- Peter P. Lambropoulos
- Marten T. Landahl
- Sidney Leibovich
- Stephen R. Leone
- Donald H. Levy
- Paul A. Libby
- Rulon K. Linford
- Frank J. Lovas
- William G. Love
- Sudarshan K. Loyolka
- Rudolf Ludeke
- Arthur B. McDonald
- B. Vincent McKoy
- John P. McTague
- Richard P. Messmer
- David E. Moncton
- D. E. Murnick
- Jagdish Narayan
- Robert M. Nerem
- Gertrude F. Neumark
- Edward E. O'Brien
- Takeshi Oka
- Sidney L. Ossakow
- Linda R. Painter
- William H. Parkinson
- James W. Poukey
- Linda S. Powers
- David E. Pritchard
- A. Ravi Prakash Rau
- Edward F. Redish
- Thomas L. Reinecke
- William C. Reynolds
- R. G. Hamesh Robertson
- William S. Saric
- Barry I. Schneider
- Frank J. Sciulli
- Robert L. Scott
- Johanna M. H. L. Sengers
- Robin Shakeshaft
- Robert J. Shalek
- Ram R. Sharma
- Sunil K. Sinha
- Raymond Harold Spear
- John A. Stamper
- Ari van Steenbergen
- George M. Stocks
- Wolfgang Stodiek
- William Calvin Stwalley
- Jules W. Sunier
- Lawrence Talbot
- Philip Craig Taylor
- Philip L. Taylor
- Jan P. Toennies
- Joseph C. Tracy
- Egidijus E. Uzgiris
- Ernest J. Valeo
- Derek Walton
- Tsuey Tang Wang
- David L. Weaver
- Thomas A. Weber
- William H. Weinberg
- John A. Whitehead
- Sheila V. Widnall
- Herman H. Wieder
- Philip E. Wigen
- John W. Wilkens
- Jerry M. Woodall
- Alfred D. B. Woods
- James J. Wynne
- Gerold Yonas
- Ahmed H. Zewail
- Edward F. Zganjar

== 1983 ==
- Chester Alexander Jr.
- Hans C. Andersen
- John Bryant Bates
- Brian Shephard Berry
- Heinz Bilz
- Alan Reginald Bishop
- John Blackwell
- Kenneth Brecher
- Christopher Richard Brundle
- Maurice Campagna
- Anthony Joseph Campillo
- George Slade Cargill
- William Jeffries Childs
- Alfred Y. Cho
- Patricia Elizabeth Cladis
- Enrico Clementi
- David Coward
- David H. Crandall
- Lloyd Craig Davis
- Dan Dill
- Gordon William Frederick Drake
- Frank Joseph Feigl
- Kenneth Fox
- Theodore Alan Fulton
- Crispin William Gardiner
- Benjamin F. Gibson
- Jerry Paul Gollub
- Elias Greenbaum
- Edward E. Gross
- Howard Grotch
- Robert Cameron Haight
- Victor E. Henrich
- Jack Gilbert Hills
- Paul Siu-Chung Ho
- Stephen S. Holt
- Chao-Yuan Huang
- John Dimitrs Joannopoulos
- Mikkel Borlaug Johnson
- Alvin Sheldon Kanofsky
- Faqir Chand Khanna
- James C. King
- James John Krebs
- Stamatios M. Krimigis
- Donald Quincy Lamb
- I. Richard Lapidus
- Sydney Leach
- William Alexander Lester, Jr.
- Marvin Leventhal
- Frank S. Levin
- Raphael D. Levine
- Richard Emery Lingenfelter
- Andrew J. Lovinger
- Thomas Benjamin Lucatorto
- Robert Marc Mazo
- Thomas James McIlrath
- Dale Joseph Meier
- Paul H. E. Meijer
- Terry Alan Miller
- William Hughes Miller
- Joel M. Moss
- William Don Myers
- Russell T. Pack
- Charles Stedman Parmenter
- Laurence Elmer Peterson
- John Milo Poate
- Melvin Pomerantz
- Chris Quigg
- Aneesur Rahman
- William Hill Reid
- Eberhard K. Riedel
- José Ellis Ripper Jr.
- Allan Rosencwaig
- John Anthony Schellman
- Edward William Schlag
- David Nathaniel Seidman
- Bruce W. Shore
- Robert H. Socolow
- Daniel David Strottman
- Carlos R. Stroud
- Robert H. Swendsen
- Norman Henry Tolk
- James S. Trefil
- Yasutada Uemura
- Steven E. Vigdor
- Richard Frederick Voss
- William W. Willmarth
- William Hinshaw Wing
- Israel J. Wygnanski
- Frank von Hippel
- Stephen von Molnar

== 1984 ==
- Millard H. Alexander
- William Lumpkin Alford
- Margaret Alston-Garnjost
- Thomas William Appelquist
- Angela Barbaro-Galtieri
- William Bardeen
- Albert Allen Bartlett
- John Thomas Bendler
- William M. Benesch
- Robert Lewis Berger
- Klaus Hans Berkner
- Arie Bodek
- Vladimir E. Bondybey
- Jean Pierre Briand
- Leonard Jack Brillson
- William James Leslie Buyers
- Carl Edwin Carlson
- Benjamin A. Carreras
- Roy Lunsford Champion
- Ling-Lie Chau
- Noel A. Clark
- Thomas B. Cochran
- Ronald Herbert Cohen
- Samuel Alan Cohen
- Paul Dare Coleman
- Gilles Marc Corcos
- Peter Robert Couchman
- Bunny Kay Cowan Clark
- George William Crabtree
- Kenneth Morse Crowe
- Patricia Moore Dehmer
- Lynn Dale Doverspike
- Laura Eisenstein
- Shalom Eliezer
- Samuel C. Fain Jr.
- Helmut Carl Faissner
- Thomas Ferbel
- George William Flynn
- Miriam Ausman Forman
- David B. Fossan
- Stuart Jay Freedman
- Joel M. Friedman
- Mary K. Gaillard
- Thomas Korff Gaisser
- Claus Konrad Gelbke
- Thomas Frederick George
- William Royal Gibbs
- Joseph Natale Ginocchio
- Allen Marshall Goldman
- Marvin E. Goldstein
- Eoin Wedderburn Gray
- Jonathan E. Grindlay
- John Frederick Hamilton
- John Christopher Hardy
- Otto Fredrich Hausser
- Allen Max Hermann
- Rober Lyman Hickok Jr.
- Christoph Hohenemser
- George Mitchel Homsy
- Charles F. Hooper Jr.
- Louis Norberg Howard
- Ralph Charles Isler
- Martin Henry Israel
- Abram Robert Jacobson
- Philip Benjamin James
- Lynn Woodard Jelinski
- Torkil Hesselberg Jensen
- Yi-Han Kao
- Edward P. J. Kartheuser
- Michael W. Kirson
- John A. Krommes
- Leslie Gary Leal
- Juliet Lee-Franzini
- Ling-Fong Li
- Ingolf Lindau
- John Douglas Lindl
- Joseph T. C. Liu
- Frederick Lobkowicz
- Douglas Henderson Lowndes
- Vera G. Luth
- Farrel Wayne Lytle
- Victor Arviel Madsen
- June Lorraine Matthews
- James Andrew McCammon
- Edward Charles McIrvine
- Robert Harrison Mellen
- Manuel G. Menendez
- Gerald A. Miller
- Stanley L. Milora
- Mark Samuel Nelkin
- Jerry A. Nolan Jr.
- Michio Okabayashi
- Stephen Lars Olsen
- Jonathan F. Ormes
- John Edward Osher
- Stanford R. Ovshinsky
- Damodar Mangalore Pai
- Leonard E. Parker
- Carl Elliott Patton
- Richard S. Post
- Gary Arthur Prinz
- Helen R. Quinn
- Ramaswamy Srinivasa Raghavan
- Joseph Reader
- John F. Reading
- Jack Edward Rowe
- Andrei Sakharov
- Michael Schick
- Peter A. Schroeder
- Roy F. Schwitters
- Mohindar Singh Seehra
- Isaiah Shavitt
- David Sherrington
- Philip J. Siemens
- Richard Edward Siemon
- Paul Francis Slattery
- James L. Smith
- Stuart Allan Solin
- Gene D. Sprouse
- Mark William Strovink
- Lawrence Richard Sulak
- David Wood Swain
- Teruo Tamano
- John Bryan Taylor
- Robert Leighton Thomas
- Thomas Timusk
- Larry H. Toburen
- Kosta Tsipis
- Albin Tybulewicz
- Carmine Vittoria
- M. Carl Walske
- George Denis Wignall
- Edward Witten
- Curt Wittig
- Stuart Alan Wolf
- Ching-Sheng Wu
- Peter Rudolf Wyder
- Albert F. Yee
- Daniel Zwanziger

== 1985 ==
- Amnon Aharony
- George Armand Alers
- Gideon Alexander
- Tsuneya Ando
- Jonathan Arons
- Thomas Baer
- Barry Clark Barish
- Robert Allan Bernheim
- Elliott Daniel Bloom
- J. David Bowman
- Martin Breidenbach
- George S. Brown
- Keith Howard Burrell
- Ian Butterworth
- Robert Howard Callender
- Lawrence S. Cardman
- Albert Welford Castleman Jr
- Paul Michael Chaikin
- David Arthur Church
- John Clarke
- Eugene D. Commins
- Brad Cox
- Michael Creutz
- Lorenzo Jan Curtis
- Arnold J. Dahm
- Marc Davis
- Jean-Paul Desclaux
- Thomas J. Devlin
- Sebastian Doniach
- Bobby David Dunlap
- Elizabeth B. Dussan V.
- Gary J. Feldman
- Glennys Reynolds Farrar
- Zachary Fisk
- James Callaway Garland
- Reinhard Ludwig Genzel
- Frederick J. Gilman
- Robert Gilmore
- Marshall Lloyd Ginter
- Geoffrey Mark Grinstein
- Franz L. Gross
- Alan Harvey Guth
- Allan Mark Hartstein
- Jan F. Herbst
- Henry Allen Hill
- Franz Joseph Himpsel
- Brian Edward Hingerty
- Ed Vernon Hungerford
- A.K.M. Fazle Hussain
- Yoseph Imry
- Roman W. Jackiw
- Verne L. Jacobs
- Stephen Jardin
- Joshua Jortner
- Boris Jules Kayser
- Henry W. Kendall
- Klaus W. Klaus
- Raoul Kopelman
- Vaclav O. Kostroun
- Anthony James Leggett
- Chii-Dong Lin
- Lawrence Litt
- Bernard Andre Lotz
- Tom C. Lubensky
- Roger Morton Macfarlane
- Alexis P. Malozemoff
- M. Brian Maple
- Richard McFadden Martin
- Robert Lee McCrory
- Christopher Fulton McKee
- Aram Zareh Mekjian
- Robert B. Meyer
- Erik Leonard Mollo-Christensen
- Luciano Giuseppe Moretto
- Christopher Lee Morris
- Richard A. Muller
- Paul Suart Peercy
- Thomas Penney
- Christopher J Pethick
- Ronald S. Pindak
- E. Ward Plummer
- Mordecai Rosen
- Leonard Michael Sander
- Andrew M. Sandorfi
- Stephen E. Schnatterly
- James Howard Scofield
- Arnold John Sierk
- Katepalli Raju Sreenivasan
- Horst Ludwig Stormer
- Robert Anthony Street
- John Clark Sutherland
- Charles E. Swenberg
- Joseph Hooton Taylor
- Edwin Lorimer Thomas
- T. Darrah Thomas
- Michael Fielding Thorpe
- Jerry B. Torrance
- Daniel C. Tsui
- Richard P. Van Duyne
- Victor Emanuel Viola
- William Douglas Watson
- Richard A. Webb
- Edward L. Wolf
- John A. Woollam
- Barukh Yaakobi
- Masaaki Yamada
- Peter Yound Yu

== 1986 ==
- James R. Albritton
- Phillip B. Allen
- Silas James Allen
- Robert E. Anholt
- Thomas M. Antonsen
- Ali S. Argon
- Daniel Jonathon Auerbach
- Naftali Auerbach
- Mark Ya Azbel
- Bertram Batlogg
- Robert Steven Bauer
- Paul R. Berman
- Ravindra N. Bhatt
- Gary Carl Bjorklund
- Ronald E. Blackwelder
- Christopher Bottcher
- Douglas Andrew Bryman
- Amyand David Buckingham
- John David Buckmaster
- Federico Capasso
- Peter J. Catto
- Tai-Chang Chiang
- William Chinowsky
- Ying-Nan Chiu
- Steven Chu
- David Richard Clarke
- Claude Cohen-Tannoudji
- David Risdon Crosley
- Paul J. Dagdigian
- Jack Davis
- Patrick H. Diamond
- James F. Drake
- Frank Barry Dunning
- Robert A. Eisenstein
- Kenneth B. Eisenthal
- Charles P. Enz
- Ralph Feder
- Paul D. Feldman
- Roger William Finlay
- Daniel Sebastian Fisher
- Władysław Fiszdon
- William R. Frazer
- Daniel Z. Freedman
- Jacques Friedel
- Henry Jonathan Frisch
- Pierre-Gilles de Gennes
- Albert Ghiorso
- H. Brian Gilbody
- John M. Goodkind
- Sandra Charlene Greer
- Dennis Stanley Greywall
- Feza Gursey
- Charles Martin Guttman
- Yukap Hahn
- Frederick Duncan Michael Haldane
- Eugene E. Haller
- Gail G. Hanson
- Haim Harari
- Richard J. Hawryluk
- Wallace Dean Hayes
- Thorwald Herbert
- David George Hitlin
- Robin M. Hochstrasser
- Darleane Hoffman
- Shaw Ling Hsu
- Setsuno Ichimaru
- Shirley Ann Jackson
- Allan Stanley Jacobson
- Marilyn E. Jacox
- Robert Loren Jaffe
- Thomas R. Jarboe
- David Robert Kassoy
- Frederick K. Lamb
- Paul G. Langacker
- Yue-Ying Lau
- Robert B. Laughlin
- Donald George LeGrand
- Edward Kyung-Chai Lee
- Patrick A. Lee
- Marc David Levenson
- Steven G. Louie
- Olli Viktor Lounasmaa
- Margaret L. A. MacVicar
- William Joseph Marciano
- Dennis L. Matthews
- J. Douglas McDonald
- Michael Walford McNaughton
- Horia Metiu
- Alfred Henry Mueller
- John Stuart Muenter
- Dietrich Muller
- Robert E. Nahory
- David Robert Nygren
- Sekyu Michael Ohr
- Gordon Cecil Osbourn
- Leonid Ozernoy
- Kosal Chandra Pandey
- Jay M. Pasachoff
- Phillip Pechukas
- Ronald Arthur Phaneuf
- William Daniel Phillips
- Michael Ronald Philpott
- Bernard Goodwin Pope
- Michael Herbert Prior
- Robert A. Ristinen
- Gary Wayne Rubloff
- John Henry Schwarz
- Bruce Albert Scott
- Pabitra N. Sen
- John Wesley Shaner
- Stephen M. Shapiro
- Robert Herman Siemann
- Eric D. Siggia
- Charles Kent Sinclair
- Richard Errett Smalley
- Arthur Stewart Smith
- Kurt A. Snover
- Paul Heinrich Soding
- Herbert Max Steiner
- Jeffrey I. Steinfeld
- Paul Joseph Steinhardt
- Clifford M. Surko
- Donald G. Swanson
- Richard Edward Taylor
- Lester E. Thode
- David J. Thouless
- Donald Gene Truhlar
- Won-Tien Tsang
- Michael S. Turner
- William C. Turner
- Ronald E. Waltz
- John David Weeks
- Clark Woody White
- Ronald H. Willens
- David Jeffrey Wineland
- Bruce Winstein
- Kevin L. Wolf
- Ming Lun Yu
- Chris D. Zafiratos
- Ahmet Ziyaeddin
- Paul Zoller

== 1987 ==
- Philip L. Altick
- Orlando Alvarez
- Nabil M. Amer
- Klaus Andres
- W. David Arnett
- Phaedon Avoutis
- Lawrence Badash
- Harvey Edward Bair
- Bruce Richard Barrett
- George J. Basbas
- Gerd Bergmann
- Anand Kumar Bhatia
- David John Bishop
- Manfred Bitter
- Michael Thomas Bowers
- Richard Nelson Boyd
- Robert S. Brodkey
- Boyd Alex Brown
- Norman Brown
- Robert J. Budnitz
- Paul David Burrow
- William Hill Butler
- David S. Cannell
- Mark J. Cardillo
- Moses H. W. Chan
- Sunney I. Chan
- Morell S. Chance
- James Robert Chelikowsky
- C.F. Chen
- Shih-I Chu
- Kwong T. Chung
- Bruce Ira Cohen
- John Franklin Cooke
- Gerald Cooperstein
- John S. Dahler
- G. Thomas Davis
- Brian Roy Dennis
- Nilendra Ganesh Deshpande
- Duane Alfred Dicus
- Gerald J. Dolan
- Louise Ann Dolan
- Estia Joseph Eichten
- David John Ernst
- Charles Sherwood Fadley
- Charles M. Falco
- James Martin Farrar
- Richard D. Field
- Nathaniel Joseph Fisch
- Fernando Flores
- William T. Ford
- James Lewis Friar
- Harold Leo Friedman
- William Michael Gelbart
- Donald Stewart Gemmell
- William Ronald Gentry
- George Hudson Gilmer
- Bernard Gittleman
- Henry Russell Glyde
- Robert James Goldston
- Jeffrey Goldstone
- Paul Dutton Grannis
- Tom J. Gray
- George Gruner
- Donald A. Gurnett
- Martin O. Harwit
- Allan Austin Hauer
- Wick C. Haxton
- Eric Johnson Heller
- Joseph Pierre Heremans
- Jack M. Hollander
- James Chen Hsiang
- Heinrich Erwin Hunziker
- Daniel Lewis Jassby
- Sudhanshu S. Jha
- Walter Eric Kauppuila
- Lawrence Lee Kazmerski
- Lionel Cooper Kimerling
- Janos Kirz
- Michael L. Knotek
- Allen Stephen Krieger
- Alvin L. Kwiram
- Kenneth Lee
- Ira W. Levin
- Robert Grayson Littlejohn
- Neville C. Luhmann Jr.
- Keith Bradford MacAdam
- Benoit B. Mandelbrot
- Earl S. Marmar
- Gene F. Mazenko
- James H. McGuire
- William Charles Mead
- Allen P. Mills
- Peter J. Mohr
- Melvin Month
- Michael A. Morrison
- Ulrich Mosel
- David Mukamel
- Shaul Mukamel
- Cherry Ann Murray
- Murugappan Muthukumar
- E. Thomas Nash
- Bernard M. K. Nefkens
- William Joel Nellis
- David R. Nelson
- Anthony V. Nero
- Dennis M. Newns
- Mikko Antero Paalanen
- Jamshed Ruttonshaw Patel
- Roberto Daniele Peccei
- Claudio Pellegrini
- Warner L. Peticolas
- James Eric Pilcher
- Aron Pinczuk
- T.V. Ramakrishnan
- Neville William Reay
- Larry George Redekopp
- John Robert Rees
- Isaac F. Silvera
- Brian Matthew Salzberg
- George Choppel Schatz
- Richard A. Scribner
- Ping Sheng
- Shobha Singh
- William John Skocpol
- Richard C. Slansky
- Ronald Dennis Stambaugh
- Talbert Sheldon Stein
- Rogers Hall Stolen
- Henry Raymond Strauss
- Neil Samuel Sullivan
- Eric Carl Svensson
- Timothy James McNeil Symons
- Anthony William Thomas
- Walter Rollier Thorson
- Thomas Tiedje
- Matthew Tirrell
- James T. Tough
- James W. Truran
- Wu-Ki Tung
- T. Venkatesan
- Rand Lewis Watson
- Donald Henry Weingarten
- Andrew W. Weiss
- Alan Edward Whitmarsh-Knight
- Eyvind Hugo Wichmann
- Helmut Wiedemann
- Edward Aston Williams
- Barbara Ann Wilson
- Michael Stewart Witherell
- Richard Patrick Wool
- Stanford E. Woosley

== 1988 ==
- James Bernhard Anderson
- Jeffrey Alan Appel
- Hassan Aref
- Daniel Ashery
- Robert Hamilton Austin
- Helmut Willy Baer
- Aiyalam P. Balachandran
- Itzhak Bars
- Eugene William Beier
- Carl M. Bender
- A. Nihat Berker
- Frederick Kent Browand
- Hugh R. Brown
- Truman Roscoe Brown
- Geoffrey Ronald Burbidge
- Robert Nathan Cahn
- John Montgomery Cameron
- David C. Cartwright
- Robert Joseph Cava
- Vincent S. Chan
- Ronald Richard Chance
- Michael Stephen Chanowitz
- Peter J. Chantry
- Daniel Simon Chemla
- Alan Fred Clark
- William Ernest Cooke
- Lennox L. Cowie
- David Cutts
- Sumner P. Davis
- John W. DeWire
- John B. Delos
- William Wallace Destler
- Donelli Joseph DiMaria
- Richard Keith Ellis
- Robert Pollock Ely
- Eugene Engels
- William Martin Fairbank, Jr
- Barry L. Farmer
- Michael Dennis Feit
- John McMaster Finn
- Robert McLemore Fleming
- Albert Lewis Ford
- Paul Forman
- Curtis W. Frank
- Allan David Franklin
- Martin P. Fricke
- William K. George
- James Bernard Gerardo
- Robert Benny Gerber
- Franco Antonio Gianturco
- George Gidal
- Clayton Frederick Giese
- Murdock Gordon Douglas Gilchriese
- Richard Alan Gottscho
- Harvey Allen Gould
- David W. Hafemeister
- Peter Hanggi
- John Harte
- Michael George Hauser
- Andrew Hazi
- Willem Theodorus Hendricus van Oers
- Richard J. Higgins
- John P. Holdren
- Nahmin Horwitz
- Gerard Van Hoven
- Ian H. Hutchinson
- Kenneth A. Jackson
- David C. Johnston
- Hiroshi Kamimura
- Elton Neil Kaufmann
- Michael Anthony Kinch
- Thomas Bernard Walter Kirk
- Robert Paul Kirshner
- John Robert Kirtley
- Ruby Ebisuzaki Krishnamurti
- Kenneth Charles Kulander
- Mukul Kundu
- Bennett Charles Larson
- Daniel John Larson
- Donald R. Lehman
- Ira W. Levin
- Alan P. Lightman
- Teck-kah Lim
- Anthony Tung-hsu Lin
- Eugene C. Loh
- Derek Irving Lowenstein
- Kelvin G. Lynn
- Kenneth B. Lyons
- Giorgio Margaritondo
- Alan G. Marshall
- John Albert James Matthews
- Gregory B. McKenna
- Emilio Eugenio Mendez
- Frederick Henry Mies
- Arthur I. Miller
- David Andrew Barclay Miller
- Gabriel Lorimer Miller
- Kunioki Mima
- John Hays Moore
- Hadis Morkoc
- Albert J. Moscowitz
- Sidney R. Nagel
- Dimitri Nanopoulos
- William McCay Nevins
- Dwight R. Nicholson
- M. Peter Nightingale
- Stephen Philip Obenschain
- Nobuyoshi Ohyabu
- Roy Jerome Peterson
- Klaus Pinkau
- Ronald Prater
- Joel Robert Primack
- Stuart Allan Raby
- Don David Reeder
- Thomas Nicola Rescigno
- James J. Riley
- Robert Rosner
- Stephen L. Sass
- Dale W. Schaeffer
- Robert E. Schofield
- James Frederick Schooley
- John Lindblad Schrag
- Jagdeep Shah
- Charles Vernon Shank
- Larry Lee Smarr
- George F. Smoot
- Rangaswamy Srinivasan
- Weston M. Stacey
- Joachim Stohr
- James Douglas Strachan
- Toshi Tajima
- Malvin Carl Teich
- Virginia L. Trimble
- Francis S. Troyon
- John Pace VanDevender
- Paul Adrian Vandenbout
- David Ward
- Erick J. Weinberg
- John Weiner
- Per Goran Wendin
- Robert Williams
- Thomas A. Witten
- Donald James Wolford
- Peter Guy Wolynes
- Henry Vernon Wong
- Hyuk Yu

== 1989 ==
- Walter Wade Adams
- James Ward Allen
- John Edward Allen
- Edward Raymond Andrew
- Aloysius John Arko
- Bruce Arnold Barnett
- Rodney Joseph Bartlett
- Donald B. Batchelor
- William Eric Baylis
- David J. Bergman
- James Charles Bergquist
- Joel Mark Bowman
- Philip Russell Brooks
- John C. Browne
- Phillip Howard Bucksbaum
- Wit Busza
- Claude Canizares
- John Marland Carpenter
- John Robert Cary
- David Giske Cassel
- George Castro
- James Djamshid Chandi
- Tu-nan Chang
- Ho Sou Chen
- Hsien Kei Cheng
- Chia-Ling Chien
- Ara Chutjian
- Thomas Boykin Clegg
- Sidney Alan Coon
- John William Cooper
- Ferdinand V. Coroniti
- Phillip C. Cosby
- Forrest Fleming Crim
- Robert Dale Cutkosky
- John Price Doering
- John Francis Donoghue
- Richard Paul Drake
- William Alan Edelstein
- Bengt Elden
- Alan D. English
- James L. Erskine
- Kenneth M. Evenson
- Jens Feder
- Frederick R. Fickett
- Douglas B. Fitchen
- Joseph Ford
- Geoffrey Charles Fox
- Louis A. Frank
- William A. Friedman
- Elizabeth Garber
- J. Murray Gibson
- Steven Mark Girvin
- Richard Jay Goldstein
- Dennis Edward Grady
- Chris H. Greene
- Gary Stephen Grest
- Hermann G. Grimmeiss
- John Francis Gunion
- Paul K. Hansma
- Bruce N. Harmon
- Arthur Brooks Harris
- Donald LeRoy Hartill
- Satio Hayakawa
- Hanspeter Helm
- Jonathan P. Heritage
- Caroline Littlejohn Herzenberg
- Erwin Nick Hiebert
- Christopher T. Hill
- Chih-Ming Ho
- Allan R. Hoffman
- Barry R. Holstein
- Paul L. Houston
- Stanley Humphries
- K. Keith Innes
- Erich P. Ippen
- Nathan Isgur
- Alexander MacRae Jamieson
- Ronald Ceci Johnson
- James D. Jorgensen
- Glenn Russell Joyce
- Charles Fielding Finch Karney
- Henry C. Kelly
- Mark B. Ketchen
- John J. Kim
- H. Jeff Kimble
- Kate Page Kirby
- Jorg Peter Kotthaus
- Uzi Landman
- Jerzy Marian Langer
- Howard Paul Layer
- Ka-Ngo Leung
- Edward C. Lim
- Peter B. Littlewood
- Michael M.T. Loy
- Allan Hugh MacDonald
- Richard Madey
- Wayne Lee Mattice
- Julian Decatur Maynard
- Eric Mazur
- Samuel L. McCall
- Kirk Thomas McDonald
- Larry D. McLerran
- C. Alden Mead
- Paul Meakin
- James L. Merz
- Richard A. Meserve
- Richard A. Mewaldt
- Linn Frederick Mollenauer
- Ernest J. Moniz
- Rollin John Morrison
- Shoji Nagamiya
- Gerald A. Navratil
- Abraham Nitzan
- Nai-Phuan Ong
- Hans-Rudolf Ott
- Gerald L. Payne
- Benjamin Thomas Peng-nien Chu
- Vincent Zetterberg Peterson
- Pierre M. Petroff
- Warren Earl Pickett
- Daniel T. Pierce
- Stuart Pittel
- William Henry Press
- Daniel Ethan Prober
- Saul Rappaport
- Robert Landen Ray
- Alfred Romer
- Rustom Roy
- Samuel A. Safran
- Carl Edward Sagan
- Richard J. Saykally
- Abraham Seiden
- Earl D. Shaw
- Melvyn Jay Shochet
- Hans Christoph Siegmann
- Frans A. Spaepen
- Constantine Stassis
- Bill Sutherland
- John Allen Tanis
- David B. Tanner
- John A. Tataronis
- Charles Behan Thorn
- Frank S. Tomkins
- Alan Edward Tonelli
- Michael Georges Tuszewski
- Leon P. Van Speybroeck
- Jacques Vanier
- James P. Vary
- Alexander Vilenkin
- James M. Wallace
- Stephen J. Wallace
- John Edmond Walsh
- Werner Weber
- Eric Weitz
- Bjorn Havard Wiik
- John P. Wikswo
- Clifford Martin Will
- Ronald R. Winters
- Robert Eugene Wyatt
- Allan Peter Young
- Malgorzata Zielinska-Pfabe

== 1990 ==
- Steven A. Adelman
- David Charles Ailion
- Lew Allen
- Stephen Arnold
- Chi Kwan Au
- David H. Auston
- Samuel David Bader
- Gerhard R. Barsch
- Gunther Bauer
- Howard C. Berg
- Sabyasachi Bhattacharya
- David Kalman Biegelsen
- John J. Bollinger
- James B. Boyce
- Bennet Bristol Brabson
- Gerritt ten Brinke
- Charles N. Brown
- Markus Buettiker
- Joel Nathan Butler
- Thomas Anderson Callcott
- David Kelly Campbell
- George K. Celler
- Ming Sheng Chu
- Jolie A. Cizewski
- Gregory John Clark
- Elisha Cohen
- Leon Cohen
- George J. Collins
- Michael Kevin Craddock
- Buckley Crist
- Andrew Elliot Depristo
- Jozef Theofiel Devreese
- Leonard Matthew Diana
- Thomas William Donnelly
- Charles Frederick Driscoll
- Pedro Miguel Echenique
- Martin B. Einhorn
- Paul A. Evenson
- Fereydoon Family
- Harold W. Fearing
- Charlotte Froese Fischer
- Henry Eugene Fisk
- John Lawrence Freeouf
- Vladimir Fuchs
- Tony A. Gabriel
- James Roland Gaines
- Alper Abdy Garren
- Francis M. Gasparini
- Walter Glockle
- Valery A. Godyak
- Sol Michael Gruner
- Robert L. Gunshor
- James Douglas Gunton
- Devendra Gupta
- Torgny Gustafsson
- Miklos Gyulassy
- Klaus Halbach
- Chihiro Hamaguchi
- Serge Haroche
- William Hayes
- Morhehai Heiblum
- Jorge Eduardo Hirsch
- John T. Ho
- Hartmut Oskar Hotop
- John S. Huang
- David L. Huestis
- Gerald J. Iafrate
- Wayne M. Itano
- David M. Jasnow
- Joseph Andrew Johnson
- Chandrashekhar Janardan Joshi
- Paul Sebastian Julienne
- Eric Kay
- Joseph D. Kilkenny
- Stanley B. Kowalski
- Kenneth Saul Krane
- Lucjan Krause
- Morris Krauss
- Mark J. Kushner
- Kenneth D. Lane
- David C. Larbalestier
- Edison Parktak Liang
- Stuart Martin Lindsay
- Laurence S. Littenberg
- Eleftherios Mitiadis Logothetis
- Stewart Christian Loken
- Stephen R. Lundeen
- Swadesh Mitter Mahajan
- Philip Stephen Marcus
- Michael D. Marx
- Gary Miles McClelland
- John William McConkey
- Lillian C. McDermott
- Robert Bruce McKibben
- James Donald Meiss
- Fred Wolfgang Meyer
- Roger Ervin Miller
- Nariman Burjor Mistry
- Marcos Moshinsky
- Michael Jon Mumma
- Katsunobu Nishihara
- Jaan Noolandi
- Arto Veikko Nurmikko
- Piermaria Jorge Oddone
- David William Oxtoby
- John Boyd Page
- Robert S. Panvini
- Fred Petrovich
- Luciano Pietronero
- David Wixon Pratt
- David Long Price
- Martin Quack
- Wayne W. Repko
- Leo L. Riedinger
- Gene I. Rochlin
- Hal Jervis Rosen
- Kenneth J. Rothschild
- Thomas P. Russell
- Douglas Howard Sampson
- Werner Sandhas
- Roberta P. Saxon
- Lee Stewart Schroeder
- Jonas Schultz
- Varley Fullerton Sears
- Wolf Seka
- Lawrence Wayne Shacklette
- Philippe L. Similon
- Gerald James Small
- David Anthony Smith
- Robert John Soulen
- Orest G. Symko
- Cha-Mei Tang
- David W. Tank
- Thomas Nicholas Theis
- Michael L. W. Thewalt
- Rudolf Paul Thun
- Frank K. Tittel
- Melville P. Ulmer
- Masahiro Wakatani
- James Kay Graham Watson
- Erich Weigold
- Sheldon Weinbaum
- John C. Wheeler
- Carl Edwin Wieman
- Roy F. Willis
- Dan Winske
- Robert Claude Woods
- Wen-Li Wu
- Eli Yablonovitch
- Donald E. Young
- Stephen Michael Younger
- Michael E. Zeller
- Peter D. Zimmerman
- Ernst K. Zinner

== 1991 ==
- Frederick H. Abernathy
- Gerhard Abstreiter
- Ronald J. Adrian
- Irag Ruhi Afnan
- Matthew Arnold Allen
- Richard Louis Anderson
- Raymond G. Arnold
- Arnold B. Arons
- Frank T. Avignone
- John Edward Eroc Baglin
- Daniel Charles Barnes
- Frank S. Bates
- Ernst G. Bauer
- Frederick Daniel Becchetti
- James Robert Beene
- Paul Murray Bellan
- Thomas Harold Bergeman
- Jerry Bernholc
- Norbert M. Bikales
- Roy Billinge
- James N. Bradbury
- Robert Alan Buhrman
- Robert L. Byer
- John Harris Cantrell
- Sudip Chakravarty
- Paul Morris Champion
- Ganesar Chanmugam
- Mau Hsiung Chen
- Chio Z. Cheng
- Roy Clarke
- Benjamin S. Cooper
- Alexander DeVolpi
- Anthony John Demaria
- Jules P. G. Deutsch
- Ken A. Dill
- Jonathan M. Dorfan
- Gerald Francis Dugan
- Alexander R. Dzierba
- Philip Charles Efthimion
- William Frederick Egelhoff
- Robert Ehrlich
- Richard R. Ernst
- Lyndon Rees Evans
- James Elliot Faller
- Dieter Fick
- Ronald Forrest Fox
- Paolo Franzini
- Bernard Frois
- Sergio Piero Fubini
- Gerald Gabrielse
- William J. Gallagher
- John Herbert Gardner
- William Ray Garrett
- Azriel Z. Genack
- Nicholas Joseph Giordano
- Kenneth Ivan Golden
- Edward Robert Grant
- Enrico Gratton
- Celso Grebogi
- Daniel Green
- Yogendra Mohan Gupta
- Etienne M.P. Guyon
- Alice Just Harding
- Clifford Kingston Hargrove
- William Louis Hase
- Adil B. Hassam
- Jerome Biller Hastings
- Hermann Anton Haus
- John Bingley Hayter
- Albert Peet Hickman
- Albert Josef Hofmann
- Thomas Y. Hsiang
- Joseph Donald Huba
- Winifred M. Huo
- Peter D. Johnson
- Philip Martin Johnson
- Steven Michael Kahn
- Michael L. Klein
- Cornerlius Ephraim Klots
- Jeffrey T. Koberstein
- Samuel Krinsky
- John Grant Larson
- Jean-Noel Georges Leboeuf
- Tsung-Shung Harry Lee
- Barbara Goss Levi
- Kathryn Levin
- Judah Levine
- Raphael M. Littauer
- Gabrielle Gibbs Long
- Fred Everett Luborsky
- Luciano Maiani
- Chanchal Kumar Majumdar
- Bruce H. Margon
- Indrek Martinson
- Yoshika Masuda
- Kevin M. Mcguire
- Althel Lavelle Merts
- Hendrik Jan Monkhorst
- Patricia M. Mooney
- Philip L. Morton
- Nil Lilienberg Muench
- John Anthony Mydosh
- Samuel M. Myers
- Fred Myhrer
- Hassan M. Nagib
- Alan Marc Nathan
- Keith Adam Nelson
- David John Nesbitt
- Constantine A. Neugebauere
- Louis S. Osborne
- Michele Parrinello
- Dale Lee Partin
- James McEwan Paterson
- David John Pegg
- David Robert Penn
- Stephen John Pennycook
- Michael Pepper
- John Paul Perdew
- Sigrid Doris Peyerimhoff
- Fred Hugo Pollak
- Stephen B. Pope
- John P. Preskill
- Richard Henry Price
- Morris Pripstein
- Paul J. Reardon
- Roland Wells Redington
- Lynn Eduard Rehn
- Robert H. Romer
- F. Sherwood Rowland
- Bernard Sadoulet
- Dale Edward Sayers
- Dietrich Schroeer
- Giacinto Scoles
- David George Seiler
- Gerhard Martin Sessler
- Michael H. Shaevitz
- Jag Jeet Singh
- Lawrence Sirovich
- John Smith
- Elias Snitzer
- Constantinos M. Soukoulis
- John Charles Spence
- Allan Daniel Stauffer
- Gary Steigman
- Gregory Brian Stephenson
- David Gordon Stroud
- Roger H. Stuewer
- Samuel Isaac Stupp
- Chong Sook P. Sung
- Abraham Szoke
- Frank Tabakin
- Christopher K.W. Tam
- E. Dennis Theriot
- Shih-Tung Tsai
- Raymond Tsutse Tung
- James J. Valentini
- Robert S. Van Dyck
- Joseph T. Verdeyen
- Friedrich Wagner
- James David Allen Walker
- John H. Weaver
- Willes H. Weber
- Franz Joachim Wegner
- Henry Richard Weller
- Hemantha Kumar Wickramasinghe
- Tung-Mow Yan
- Sau Lan Yu Wu
- Ellen Gould Zweibel
- Earl Frederick Zwicker

== 1992 ==
- Alexei A. Abrikosov
- Boris L. Altshuler
- Eric J. Amis
- David Vincent Anderson
- James Russell Asay
- David D. Awschalom
- Paul Frank Barbara
- Klaas Bergmann
- Elliot R. Bernstein
- Thomas Joseph Bowles
- George W. Brandenburg
- Yvan J. Bruynseraede
- Ernst Bucher
- Joachim Burgdorfer
- David Lyle Burke
- Adam Seth Burrows
- David Charles Cassidy
- David M. Ceperley
- Colston Chandler
- Meera Chandrasekhar
- Andrew Francis Cheng
- Wei-Kan Chu
- Charles Winthrop Clark
- Francis E. Close
- Francis T. Cole
- Susan N. Coppersmith
- Marjorie D. Corcoran
- Robert D. Cousins
- Carol Jo Crannell
- Jack Emerson Crow
- John Perry Cumalat
- Hai-Lung Dai
- Richard Stephen Davis
- Yaroslav S. Derbenev
- Thomas Harold Dunning
- Pulak Dutta
- James Gary Eden
- Donald Andrew Edwards
- Alexei L. Efros
- James P. Eisenstein
- George E. Ewing
- Roger Wirth Falcone
- David E. Farrell
- Leonard X. Finegold
- John Edward Fischer
- Gerhard E. Fisher
- Raymond J. Fonck
- Jerry Wayne Forbes
- Fritz Josef Friedlaender
- Charles Stewart Gillmor
- Alan Leonard Goodman
- Christopher Robert Gould
- Steve Granick
- James Edward Griffin
- Jacob NMI Grun
- Hans Herbert Gutbrod
- James Stewart Harris
- Jeffrey A. Harvey
- Tony F. Heinz
- Jackson R. Herring
- Judith Herzfeld
- Art Hobson
- Frances Anne Houle
- Ruth H. Howes
- John Peter Huchra
- David Greybull Hummer
- David A. Huse
- Klaus Bruno Jaeger
- Robert V. F. Janssens
- Kenneth David Jordan
- George Ernest Kalmus
- Joseph I. Kapusta
- Gary Lee Kellogg
- Robert David Kephart
- Peter M. Koch
- Roger Hilsen Koch
- Paul R. Kolodner
- Joel Koplik
- John M. Kosterlitz
- Tung-Sheng Kuan
- Joseph Anthony Kunc
- Richard C. Lamb
- Lang L. Lao
- Ronald Martin Laszewski
- James Edward Lawler
- W. W. Lee
- Gerard Peter Lepage
- Peter Michael Levy
- Paulett Creyke Liewer
- Sung-Piau Lin
- Katja Lindenberg
- Gregory A. Loew
- Richard A. London
- Michael S. Lubell
- Luigi A. Lugiato
- Alan Cooper Luntz
- Jeffrey Whidden Lynn
- Don Harvey Madison
- George Edward Masek
- Dan McCammon
- Clyde William McCurdy
- John Cameron Miller
- Terence Edward Mitchell
- William Esco Moerner
- Kenneth Charles Moffeit
- Parvitz Moin
- Peter Alexis Monkewitz
- Keiji Morokuma
- Philip J. Morrison
- Nimai Chang Mukhopadhyay
- Yasushi Nishida
- J. Michael Nitschke
- Masayuki Ono
- Paul Francis Ottinger
- Sherwood Parker
- Stuart S.P. Parkin
- Gerald Alvin Peterson
- William P. Pratt
- James Douglas Prentice
- Hans-Joachim Queisser
- Clifford Edward Rhoades
- Rogers Charles Ritter
- John M. Rowe
- Ronald Don Ruth
- Marie-Louise Saboungi
- Edward Thaddeus Samulski
- Wilton Turner Sanders
- Sankar Das Sarma
- Tatuya Sasakawa
- Alfred Simon Schlachter
- Zach Schlesinger
- Hans A. Schuessler
- Klaus Schulten
- Hugh Lawrence Scott
- Marjorie Dale Shapiro
- Stephen Roger Sharpe
- Benjamin Ching-Chun Shen
- James D. Simpson
- John Michael Soures
- Kenneth Charles Stanfield
- Edward A. Stern
- James Reginald Stevens
- Kumble R. Subbaswamy
- Richard Michael Talman
- Toyoichi Tanaka
- Richard Joel Temkin
- James R. Thompson
- Joe David Thompson
- George Charles Turrell
- James Walter Van Dam
- David Lloyd VanderHart
- Conrad M. Williams
- Ellen D. Williams
- Sigurd Wagner
- Thomas Patrick Wangler
- Wu-Tsung W. Weng
- Bruce Joseph West
- Matthew Norton Wise
- John Thomas Yates
- Glenn Reid Young
- Peter Zoller
- Antonio Carlos de Sa Fonseca

== 1993 ==
- Carl W. Akerlof
- Massimo Altarelli
- Ole K. Andersen
- Oscar A. Anderson
- W. Lester S. Andrews
- Michael John Aziz
- Per Bak
- Anna Christina Balazs
- Alfonso Baldereschi
- James B. Ball
- R. Michael Barnett
- Gerald Bastard
- Kurt H. Becker
- Kevin Shawn Bedell
- Robert Paul Behringer
- Gary Lee Bennett
- Stefano Bernabei
- Frederick Michael Bernthal
- Amitava Bhattacharjee
- Jean Luc Bredas
- Ross D. Bringans
- Paul W. Brumer
- Bimla Buti
- Carolyn Denise Caldwell
- Eugene M. Chudnovsky
- Francisco Claro
- Donald L. Correll
- Donald Gerald Coyne
- Janusz Dabrowski
- Per Fridtjof Dahl
- Jay Clarence Davis
- Viktor Konstantyn Decyk
- George Dennis Dracoulis
- Adam T. Drobot
- Ora Entin-Wohlman
- Shahab Etemad
- Anthony Fainberg
- Julio Fernando Fernandez
- Arne Woolset Fliflet
- Didler de Fontaine
- Melissa E. B. Franklin
- Gerald G. Fuller
- Elsa M. Garmire
- Barbara Jane Garrison
- Katherine R. Gebbie
- Donald F. Geesaman
- Neil Gehrels
- Howard Georgi
- Giorgio M. Giacomelli
- Roy Gordon Goodrich
- Laura H. Greene
- Gunter Grieger
- James Edward Gubernatis
- Parvez Nariman Guzdar
- Howard Haber
- Georges Hadziioannou
- Lawrence John Hall
- Kristl B. Hathaway
- Arthur F. Hebard
- Richard Henry Helm
- John Charles Hemminger
- Peter Herczeg
- Dennis W. Hewett
- Edward A. Hinds
- Lillian Hartman Hoddeson
- David K. Hoffman
- Stephen Dockler Holmes
- Roy J. Holt
- Anthony Houghton
- Richard E. Howard
- Cheng-Cher Huang
- Huey-Wen Huang
- Bruce Samuel Hudson
- Patrick Huerre
- Russell A. Hulse
- Maurice Jacob
- Kenneth C. Janda
- John A. Jaros
- Javier S. Jimenez
- Rainer Johnsen
- Noble Marshall Johnson
- Daniel D. Joseph
- Malvin H. Kalos
- Daniel M. Kammen
- Raymond Edward Kapral
- Kimo Kaski
- Eberhard K. Keil
- John Gordon King
- Miguel German Kiwi
- Joseph Klafter
- Lia Krusin-Elbaum
- Julius Kuti
- Joseph T. Lach
- Ronald Gary Larson
- Silvanus S. Lau
- Christoph W. Leemann
- Frieder Lenz
- Anthony Leonard
- Marsha I. Lester
- Herbert Levine
- Robert R. Lewis
- Timothy P. Lodge
- Jose Luis Moran Lopez
- Serge Luryi
- Ernest IIya Malamud
- Andreas Mandelis
- Joseph V. Martinez
- Glenn Marggraf Mason
- Ernesto Mazzucato
- James S. McCarthy
- Joseph Charles McDonald
- Robert D. McKeown
- David John Millener
- Thomas M. Miller
- Michael Robert Moldover
- Eduardo Chaves Montenegro
- Johan Elisa Mooij
- Sadao Nakai
- Thomas L. Neff
- Robert John Nemanich
- Daniel Milton Neumark
- Catherine Barbara Newman-Holmes
- Cheuk-Yiu Ng
- Jens N. Oddershede
- Harold Olof Ogren
- Eric Oldfield
- Clifford Gerald Olson
- Elaine Surick Oran
- Joseph W. Orenstein
- Victor Manuel Orera
- Yuri F. Orlov
- Julio Mario Ottino
- Hasan Padamsee
- Jen-Chieh Peng
- Clive H. Perry
- Bernard M. Pettitt
- Julia M. Phillips
- Nanette Phinney
- Helmut Piel
- Edward H. Poindexter
- Andrea Prosperetti
- Ricardo Leiva Ramirez
- Emmanuel Iosif Rashba
- Allan Reiman
- Geraldine L. Richmond
- Donald O. Rockwell
- Phillip Grisier Roos
- Ralph Z. Roskies
- Marc Christopher Ross
- Marvin Ross
- Abdus Salam
- Lynn Frances Schneemeyer
- Brian David Serot
- Michael F. Shlesinger
- James Siegrist
- Pierre Sikivie
- William Thomas Silfvast
- Stanley Skupsky
- Ivo Slaus
- Cullie James Sparks
- Steven William Stahler
- Rainer Ludwig Stenzel
- Gregory Randall Stewart
- Alfred Douglass Stone
- Sheldon Leslie Stone
- Ronald M. Sundelin
- Ulrich Werner Suter
- Jean Hebb Swank
- Isao Tanihata
- Paul Willis Terry
- Rudolf M. Tromp
- William Ernest Turchinetz
- J. Anthony Tyson
- Robert F. C. Vessot
- Johann Albrecht Wagner
- Chin Hsien Wang
- Trevor C. Weekes
- Claude Weisbuch
- Martin C. Weisskopf
- Michael B. Weissman
- David A. Weitz
- William Weltner Jr.
- Pierre Wiltzius
- King-Lap Wong
- Miguel Jose Yacaman
- David Yevick
- Simon Shin-Lun Yu
- Arnulfo Zepeda
- Stewart Jay Zweben
- Alberto Franco de Santoro

== 1994 ==
- Neal Broadus Abraham
- John F. Ahearne
- Harjit Singh Ahluwalia
- John M. Alexander
- Jeeva Satchith Anandan
- Peter B. Armentrout
- Ahmet Yasar Aydemir
- A. Baha Balantekin
- Jayanth R. Banavar
- Harrison Hooker Barrett
- Ilan Ben-Zvi
- Paul Allan Bernhardt
- R. Russell Betts
- Joseph John Bisognano
- Louis Aub Bloomfield
- John Francis Brady
- Peter Braun-Munzinger
- Harold Brown
- Reinhard Frank Bruch
- Charles Edwin Campbell
- John Howard Carmichael
- Sylvia Teresse Ceyer
- Chung-Hsuan Winston Chen
- Stephen Z.D. Cheng
- Shirley Chiang
- Gianfranco Chiarotti
- Alan A. Chodos
- Niels Tage Egede Christensen
- Philip Ira Cohen
- Richard K. Cooper
- Michael Alan Copland
- Derrick Samuel F. Crothers
- Donald Robert Curran
- Roger F. Dashen
- Michael Dine
- Athene Margaret Donald
- Daniel Herschel Eli Dubin
- Robert Everett Ecke
- Eleftherios N. Economou
- Gary Lynn Eesley
- Gerald Lewis Epstein
- Karl A. Erb
- Steven Alan Fetter
- Heinrich Edwin Fiedler
- Manfred K. Fink
- Michael Fowler
- Lazar Friedland
- George M. Fuller
- Peter Henry Garbincius
- Kenn Corwin Hancock Gardner
- Sylvester James Gates
- Timothy James Gay
- James Henry Glownia
- David Goldstein
- Erich Gornik
- Steven A. Gottlieb
- Paul Lee Gourley
- Richard Joseph Groebner
- Rajan Gupta
- Steven W. Haan
- Francis Louis Halzen
- Mishin Nayef Harakeh
- Jeffrey Hunter Harris
- Michael Arthur Harrison
- William George Harter
- Karl Hess
- Jeffrey Warren Hudgens
- Hugh Steven Hudson
- Sek Wen Hui
- Boris Lazarevich Ioffe
- Harold E. Jackson
- Ralph Raymond Jacobs
- Erik Jakobsson
- Joseph Martin Jasinski
- Yanching Jerry Jean
- Barbara Jones
- Ravinder Kachru
- Catherine Kallin
- Aharon Kapitulnik
- Kwang-Je Kim
- Mahn Won Kim
- Hubert Ellis King
- George Kirczenow
- Theodore Ross Kirkpatrick
- Richard Andrew Klemm
- Che-Ming Ko
- Matti Krusius
- Kuniharu Kubodera
- Robert L. Kuczkowski
- Narendra Kumar
- Robert Henry Lehmberg
- Michael Jerry Levine
- Keng S. Liang
- Donald H. Liebenberg
- Ingvar Per Kare Lindgren
- Christopher H. Llewellyn-Smith
- Christopher John Lobb
- Toh-Ming Lu
- Thomas S. Lundgren
- David Brian MacFarlane
- Douglas E. MacLaughlin
- Subhendra Dev Mahanti
- Hokwang Mao
- Grant James Mathews
- Roger Heering Miller
- Donald A. Monticello
- Thomas Joseph Morgan
- Ana Celia Mota
- Theodore D. Moustakas
- Berndt Mueller
- Eric Phillip Muntz
- N. Sanjeeva Murthy
- Witold Nazarewicz
- Allan A. Needell
- G. Paul Neitzel
- Peter Van Nieuwenhuizen
- Richard E. Packard
- Costas N. Papanicolas
- Robert Kelly Parker
- John F. Paulson
- Hans Laszlo Pecseli
- Nasser Peyghambarian
- Loren N. Pfeiffer
- Eliyahou Pollak
- Joseph S. Poon
- Akunuri V. Ramayya
- Sally K. Ride
- Emanuele Rimini
- Dan-Olof W. Riska
- Bradley Lee Roberts
- Robert Edward Robson
- Thomas Felix Rosenbaum
- Peter Jacob Rossky
- John Joseph Rush
- John J. Russell
- Cyrus R. Safinya
- William Lee Schaich
- Dalton D. Schnack
- Susan Joyce Seestrom
- Vitali Donovich Shapiro
- Marleigh Chandler Sheaff
- Richard L. Sheffield
- Paul Fenton Shepard
- Robert E. Shrock
- Arthur Lee Smirl
- Robert Gene Snyder
- Santosh Kumar Srivastava
- Michael John Stavola
- Duncan Gregory Steel
- George Franklin Sterman
- Ryszard Stroynowski
- Sune R. Svanberg
- Jack Bernard Swift
- Ronald E. Taam
- Tony Stephen Taylor
- Jerry D. Tersoff
- Claudia Denke Tesche
- Saul A. Teukolsky
- Henry Sze-Hoi Tye
- Michel Andre Van Hove
- Silvia L. Volker
- Robert Joseph Warmack
- Warren Sloan Warren
- Edwin Ross Williams
- Dieter Wolf
- Michael Charles Zarnstorff
- George Moiseevitch Zaslavsky
- Abdelfattah M. G. Zebib
- Johannes M. J. van Leeuwen
- Ernst D. von Meerwall

== 1995 ==
- Steven Lynn Allen
- Miron Ya Amusia
- Ennio Arimondo
- Cyrus Baktash
- James Stutsman Ball
- William A. Barletta
- Guenter G. Baum
- Max L. Berkowitz
- Guy C. Berry
- Ved Prakash Bhatnagar
- Philip A. Blythe
- Punit Boolchand
- Kit Hansell Bowen
- Larry Lee Boyer
- Helmut Rainer Brand
- Robert M. Briber
- Ian Gordon Brown
- Ludwig W. Bruch
- Robert Allen Bubeck
- Carlos J. Bustamante
- Swapan Chattopadhyay
- Pisin Chen
- Shiyi Chen
- Timothy Edward Chupp
- Christopher E. Clayton
- James Samuel Cohen
- Lee A. Collins
- Barbara Hope Cooper
- Martin D. Cooper
- Pierce S. Corden
- Thomas M. Cormier
- Patricia Metzger Cotts
- Robert Woodhouse Crompton
- Michael C. Cross
- George Csanak
- James Whitman Davenport
- Cary N. Davids
- Sally Dawson
- Harry William Deckman
- Lance Jenkins Dixon
- John Jacob Domingo
- Nancy M. Dowdy
- Reiner Martin Dreizler
- Howard Dennis Drew
- Vernon J. Ehlers
- Donald M. Eigler
- Theodore Lee Einstein
- Jack W. Ekin
- Luis R. Elias
- Steven Michael Errede
- Ilya I. Fabrikant
- Joel Fajans
- Lewis John Fetters
- Gerald J. Fishman
- Ching-Yao Fong
- Margaret J. Geller
- Nigel David Goldenfeld
- Harvey Allen Gould
- Peter Fitzroy Green
- Geoffrey L. Greene
- Donald Christian Griffin
- Marcos Hugo Grimsditch
- David Lawrence Griscom
- Robert Cort Haddon
- Taik Soo Hahm
- Richard Alan Haight
- Malcolm Golby Haines
- Pertti J. Hakonen
- Dennis Gene Hall
- William P. Halperin
- Rodney Elbert Harrington
- Blayne Heckel
- Bretislav Victor Heinrich
- Kenneth Jeffrey Heller
- Russell Julian Hemley
- David Orlin Hestenes
- James Conway Higdon
- Kai-Ming Ho
- Wilson Ho
- Evelyn Lynn Hu
- Randall G. Hulet
- Rudolph C. Hwa
- George Francis Imbusch
- Warren Bruce Jackson
- William Morgan Jackson
- Anthony M. Johnson
- Peter I. P. Kalmus
- Yoshiaki Kato
- Bradley D. Keister
- Kirby Wayne Kemper
- Thomas Albert Kennedy
- Stephen D. Kevan
- Barry M. Klein
- Dale D. Koelling
- Henry Krakauer
- Syamal Kumar Lahiri
- Jeffrey S. Lannin
- Kevin K. Lehmann
- Mel Philip Levy
- Charles M. Lieber
- Larry S. Liebovitch
- Peter Sejersen Lomdahl
- Gabriel Luther
- Brian James MacGowan
- Paul Blanchard Mackenzie
- Janardhan Manickam
- William Anthony Mann
- Nagi Nicholas Mansour
- Gerald E. Marsh
- Jay N. Marx
- Moshe Matalon
- Richard Alfred Matzner
- Michael E. Mauel
- Michael M. May
- Donald G. McDonald
- Natalia Kalfe Meshkov
- Howard Michael Milchberg
- James Paul Miller
- William R. Molzon
- Philip John Morris
- Samuel Harvey Moseley
- Thomas W. Mossberg
- Tsuneyoshi Nakayama
- Risto Matti Nieminen
- Tetsuji Nishikawa
- Michael Ray Norman
- Shoroku Ohnuma
- Jose Nelson Onuchic
- Robert Steell Orr
- Carmen Ortiz
- Eric H. Pinnington
- Robert Louis Powell
- Paras N. Prasad
- Stephen Turnham Pratt
- Paul Anthony Quin
- Terence John Quinn
- George W. Rayfield
- Bruce A. Remington
- Peter James Reynolds
- Charles Wayne Roberson
- Ian Keith Robinson
- Joseph Rotblat
- Richard Eiseman Rothschild
- Probir Roy
- Serge Rudaz
- Bernard Sapoval
- Ned Robert Sauthoff
- Harvey Scher
- Jan Frederick Schetzina
- Mordechay Schlesinger
- Dieter Herbert Schneider
- Wolf-Udo Schrvder
- John Theodore Seeman
- Ker-Chung Shaing
- Robert N. Shelton
- Kenneth Wayne Shepard
- Michael S. Shur
- Joseph I. Silk
- Joel A. Snow
- Jin-Joo Song
- Roger L. Stockbauer
- Paul Stoler
- Edward J. Strait
- Haskell Joseph Taub
- Julia A. Thompson
- Jeffrey Y. Tsao
- Dale J. Van Harlingen
- David Vanderbilt
- Zeev Valentine Vardeny
- Thomas A. Weaver
- Stephen A. Wender
- John Bailey West
- Alice Elizabeth White
- Douwe Alle Wiersma
- Richard Guy Woolley
- York-Peng Edward Yao
- Michael C. Zerner
- Francisco de la Cruz

== 1996 ==
- A. Paul Alivisatos
- Ralph F. Baierlein
- Yehuda Benzion Band
- Roger Odell Bangerter
- James M. Bardeen
- Lynn M. Barker
- Philip Edward Batson
- Uwe Eugen Becker
- Dick Bedeaux
- Ami Emanuel Berkowitz
- A. John Berlinsky
- Edmund Bertschinger
- William Samuel Bialek
- Jozef Bicerano
- Geoffrey Bodenhausen
- John Edward Bowers
- John Stuart Briggs
- Keith Burnett
- Blas Cabrera
- Marvin Eugene Cage
- Brian J. Cantwell
- George James Caporaso
- William C. Carithers
- Nicholas J. Carrera
- Yves Jean Chabal
- Ivan Emilio Chambouleyron
- Che-Ting Chan
- Cheng-Hsuan Sunshine Chen
- Chien-Te Chen
- Kwok-Tsang Cheng
- Carmen Cisneros
- Harvey Cline
- E. William Colglazier
- Max Cornacchia
- William O. Criminale
- Leonard S. Cutler
- Earl Dan Dahlberg
- Supriyo Datta
- Paul Davidovits
- Arthur F. Davidsen
- Claude Deutsch
- Louis Franklin DiMauro
- Dana D. Dlott
- Jack Frank Douglas
- Robert Dean DuBois
- Michael J. Duff
- Paul A. Durbin
- Maria Dworzecka
- Igor E. Dzyaloshinskii
- Helmut Eckelmann
- Kevin Einsweiler
- Paul Erdös
- Eric Hans Esarey
- Lee A. Feldkamp
- Da Hsuan Feng
- Massimo Vincenzo Fischetti
- Alex Friedman
- John Nicolas Galayda
- Jean Weil Gallagher
- Rodolfo Gambini
- Peter Ledel Gammel
- Walter Gekelman
- Kenneth W. Gentle
- Laurence Doon Gibbs
- Ronald Matthew Gilgenbach
- Orest Jaroslaw Glembocki
- Robert J. Gordon
- William George Graham
- Bob D. Guenther
- Nicholas John Hadley
- Vasken Hagopian
- Bruce A. Hammel
- John William Harris
- Shlomo Havlin
- Pawel Hawrylak
- William Walter Heidbrink
- Donald E. Heiman
- Christopher Lee Henley
- Arnold J. Hoff
- Charles H. Holbrow
- Emil J. Hopfinger
- Zafar Iqbal
- John Irwin
- Barbara V. Jacak
- Hans Burkal Jensen
- James Norman Johnson
- Darrell Lynn Judge
- Jeffrey Alan Kash
- Thomas Christos Katsouleas
- Jack Dean Kingsley
- Wayne Harvey Knox
- Bruce E. Koel
- John L. Kohl
- James J. Kolata
- Vladimir E. Korepin
- Ahmet Refik Kortan
- Dennis G. Kovar
- Eckhard Krotscheck
- Jaan Laane
- Steve Keith Lamoreaux
- I Yang Lee
- Paul David Lett
- Barry Franklin Levine
- Walter H. G. Lewin
- Michael A. Liberman
- Christof Litwin
- William Gregory Lynch
- Ernest Ma
- Usha Mallik
- Daniel Robert Marlow
- Yitzhak Maron
- Gérard Claude Martinez
- John C. Mather
- Robert D. Maurer
- Fenton Read McFeely
- Michael Raymond Melloch
- Adrian Lewis Melott
- Karl L. Merkle
- Roberto Daniel Merlin
- Arthur F. Messiter
- Peter I. Meszaros
- Hans-Otto Meyer
- Pierre Meystre
- James Anthony Misewich
- Frank Edward Moss
- Michael J. Murtagh
- Harry E. Mynick
- Richard Sandor Newrock
- Malcom F. Nicol
- John E. Northrup
- Martin G. Olsson
- Joseph Francis Owens
- Stephen Parke
- Thomas Perine Pearsall
- Y-K Martin Peng
- E. Sterl Phinney
- Steven Charles Pieper
- Frederick E. Pinkerton
- Anil Kumar Pradhan
- Calvin F. Quate
- Anatoly V. Radyushkin
- Miriam H. Rafailovich
- Nicholas Read
- Marion B. Reine
- Hanna Reisler
- Gregory Rewoldt
- Jeffrey D. Richman
- Charles Steven Rosenblatt
- Thomas Roser
- Lewis Josiah Rothberg
- Miquel Batalle Salmeron
- Jonathan Robert Sapirstein
- Robert Max Schmidt
- Horst Werner Schmidt-Boecking
- Kenneth Steven Schweizer
- Robert F. Sekerka
- Gerald H. Share
- Edward V. Shuryak
- Wesley Harold Smith
- Johanna Barbara Stachel
- Paul H. Steen
- James H. Stith
- Arthur Marshall Stoneham
- Laurance J. Suter
- Peter Charles Tandy
- John Joseph Taylor
- Ctirad Uher
- John Unguris
- Sukekatsu Ushioda
- Marthe Bacal Verney
- Oscar Edgardo Vilches
- Petr Vogel
- Robert M. Wald
- Gwo-Ching Wang
- Bernard Allen Weinstein
- Rainer Weiss
- Michael Widom
- Hartmut Zabel
- George B. Zimmerman

== 1997 ==
- Teijo E.W. Aberg
- Gabriel Aeppli
- Abhay Vasant Ashtekar
- Jonathan Anders Bagger
- Joseph John Barrett
- Dietrich Wolfgang Bechert
- Kenneth Lloyd Bell
- Michael George Bell
- Joze Bevk
- Gregory Scott Boebinger
- Maria-Ester Brandan
- Joseph Michael Brennan
- Jeremy Quinton Broughton
- Robijn Fredrik Bruinsma
- Jose Manuel Calleja-Pardo
- Myron Keith Campbell
- Gordon D. Cates
- David W. Chandler
- Hsueh Chia Chang
- Robert Beck Clark
- Michael M. Coleman
- Patrick L. Colestock
- Eric Allin Cornell
- Persis S. Drell
- Robert Walter Dunford
- Ronald Francis Dziuba
- Mark D. Ediger
- Peter Clay Eklund
- Donald Charles Ellison
- Wolfgang Erhard Ernst
- Stefan K. Estreicher
- Edward E. Eyler
- Randall M. Feenstra
- Frank A. Ferrone
- Erhard Wolfgang Fischer
- Raymond Kurt Fisher
- Stanley Martin Flatté
- Curt A. Flory
- G. Richard Fowles
- Henry Philip Freund
- Joshua Adam Frieman
- Edward S. Fry
- Michael George Fuda
- Robert G. Fuller
- Moshe Gai
- Gurudas Ganguli
- Angel E. Garcia
- Michael Gaster
- Steven M. George
- Leonid I. Glazman
- Reinaldo Jaime Gleiser
- Jordan A. Goodman
- Lev Petrovich Gor'kov
- Phillip L. Gould
- Paul Michael Grant
- Benjamin Grinstein
- William Oliver Hamilton
- Gregory W. Hammett
- James Patrick Hannon
- Paul Henri Heenen
- Frances Hellman
- Irving Philip Herman
- Harold Frederick Hess
- Yew Kam Eugene Ho
- William F. Hoffmann
- Yasuyuki Horie
- Larry Russel Hunter
- Mohammed Yousuff Hussaini
- Randall Duane Isaac
- Lawrence David Jackel
- Jainendra Kumar Jain
- David Collingwood Jiles
- Jorge V. José
- Elliot Paul Kanter
- Wolfgang Ketterle
- David William Kisker
- Steven Allan Kivelson
- Charles E. Kolb
- Thomas Francis Kuech
- James Daniel Kurfess
- Anne L'Huillier
- Branka Maria Ladanyi
- Ad Lagendijk
- Edward Alan Lazarus
- Dunghai Lee
- Richard W. Lee
- Shyh-Yuan Lee
- Yehoshua Levinson
- John W. Lightbody
- Konstantin Konstantin Likharev
- Keh-Fei Frank Liu
- David John Lockwood
- Kam Biu Luk
- Joseph W. Lyding
- Ronald John Madaras
- Charles Felix Maguire
- Charles Francis Majkrzak
- Martin Paul Maley
- Mary L. Mandich
- John Piper Marriner
- Eugene Richard Marshalek
- John M. Martinis
- Gyvrgy Miklos Marx
- M. Keith Matzen
- Robert L. McCarthy
- Robert R. Meier
- Frank S. Merritt
- Warren B. Mori
- Tak Hung Ning
- John R. O'Fallon
- Richard M. Osgood
- Abbas Ourmazd
- Michael Arthur Paesler
- Wonchull Park
- Albert Clarence Parr
- Ann-Marie Martensson Pendrill
- Nikolaos A. Peppas
- Athos Petrou
- David J. Pine
- Joseph G. Polchinski
- Edward Pollack
- Charles Young Prescott
- Seth Putterman
- Roger Pynn
- Veljko Radeka
- Mark G. Raizen
- Arthur Penn Ramirez
- B. D. Nageswara Rao
- Glen Anderson Rebka
- Yuriko Renardy
- Dieter Richter
- Steven Lloyd Rolston
- William Frederick Saam
- Stanley Owen Schriber
- Jerold M. Schultz
- Silvan S. Schweber
- Gopal K. Shenoy
- Mikhail A. Shifman
- Boris Ionovich Shklovskii
- Dov Shvarts
- Steven J. Sibener
- Daniel M. Siegel
- David Joseph Singh
- James Lauriston Skinner
- Dennis Michael Skopik
- Andris Skuja
- Alexander J. Smits
- Charles G. Speziale
- Todor Stefanov Stanev
- Richard Mark Stratt
- Mark Strikman
- Richard L. Sutherland
- David Franklin Sutter
- Annick Suzor-Weiner
- Gregory William Swift
- Max Tabak
- Chao Tang
- Gregory Tarle
- Curtis Bruce Tarter
- John Edward Thomas
- Doug Toussaint
- John M. Tranquada
- Robert Tycko
- Arkady Vainshtein
- Chris G. Van de Walle
- Charles Peter Verdon
- Randall Harry Victora
- Giovanni Vignale
- Mikhail Boroso Voloshin
- Gregory Alan Voth
- Shiqing Wang
- Wen I. Wang
- Hendrick Josef Weerts
- Geoffrey B. West
- John Franklin Wilkerson
- Claudine Williams
- Hugh Harrison Williams
- Jack M. Wilson
- Alan James Wootton
- Bernard Yurke
- William A. Zajc
- Andrew Mark Zangwill
- Vladimir G. Zelevinsky
- Dean A. Zollman

== See also ==
- List of American Physical Society Fellows (1921–1971)
- List of American Physical Society Fellows (1998–2010)
- List of American Physical Society Fellows (2011–)
