= Kenneth Golden =

Kenneth Golden may refer to:

- Kenneth M. Golden, American applied mathematician
- Kenneth Ivan Golden, American physicist
