= George Csanak =

Physicist

George Csanak from the Los Alamos National Laboratory (1941–2023) is a Hungarian-born American physicist. He was elected a Fellow of the American Physical Society, in the Division of Atomic, Molecular & Optical Physics in 1995, for development of many-body Green's function techniques of bound-state and scattering properties of atomic and molecular systems; significant contributions to the theoretical foundation and physical interpretation of electron-photon coincidence experiments, and for contributions to the understanding of electron scattering.

As a student, he was a recipient of a gold medal in the first International Mathematical Olympiad. He attended the Lajos Kossuth University (Debrecen, Hungary), where he received a master's degree in physics. He received a Ph.D. in physics in 1971 from the University of Southern California. In 1975, he joined Los Alamos National Laboratory, working in the Theoretical Division on a variety of problems in atomic, molecular, optical, and quantum physics. Over his career, he published 172 scientific articles that were cited more than 2450 times.

Csanak died on 22 February 2023.

== See also ==
- List of fellows of the American Physical Society (1972–1997)
