= Faqir Chand Khanna =

American physicist

Faqir Chand Khanna from the University of Victoria, was awarded the status of Fellow in the American Physical Society, after he was nominated by their Division of Nuclear Physics in 1983, for his work on effective operators which had led to deeper understanding of physical phenomena in a broad range of many-body problems including quasiparticle aspects in nuclear structure, the interplay between nucleons and mesons, and excitation in normal liquid He.

== See also ==
- List of fellows of the American Physical Society (1972–1997)
