= John Jacob Domingo =

John Jacob Domingo from the Continuous Electron Beam Accelerator Facility (CEBAF) - Jefferson Lab, was awarded the status of Fellow in the American Physical Society, after they were nominated by their Division of Nuclear Physics in 1995, for sustained scientific and technical contributions to intermediate energy nuclear physics at the Swiss Institute for Nuclear Research (SIN), and for leading the design and construction of the three experimental facilities at the newly completed Continuous Electron Beam Accelerator Facility (CEBAF).

== See also ==
- List of fellows of the American Physical Society (1972–1997)
