= David L. Huestis =

American physicist (1946–2024)

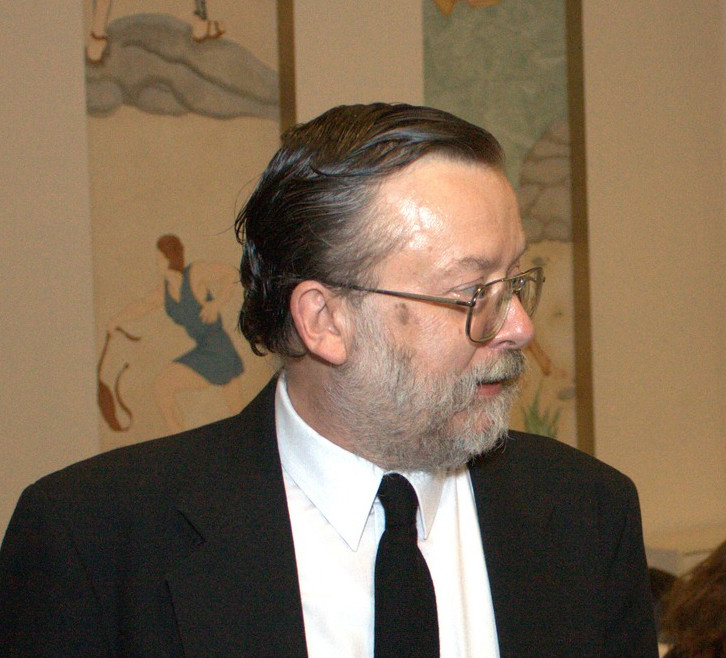

David L. Huestis (December 20, 1946 – January 12, 2024) was an American physicist and inventor associated with SRI International. Huestis was awarded the status of Fellow in the American Physical Society, after being nominated by their Division of Atomic, Molecular & Optical Physics in 1990, for "his extensive, broad-ranging theoretical contributions and collaborations with experimentalists leading to fundamental understanding in areas of atomic and molecular excited states, molecular spectroscopy, excimer-laser kinetics, nonlinear optics, and scattering theory."

Huestis has applied for several patents.

== Personal life ==
Huestis was married and lived in Menlo Park, California.

== See also ==
- List of fellows of the American Physical Society (1972–1997)
