= James Paul Miller =

James Paul Miller from the Boston University, was awarded the status of Fellow in the American Physical Society, after they were nominated by their Division of Nuclear Physics in 1995, for the development of a high resolution NaI detector and the performance of pioneering experiments on nuclear Compton scattering and radiative kaon capture utilizing this device which paved the way for the design and construction of other high resolution calorimeters.

== See also ==
- List of fellows of the American Physical Society (1972–1997)
