= Julia A. Thompson =

Particle physicist

Julia A. Thompson, an experimental particle physicist at the University of Pittsburgh, was awarded the status of Fellow in the American Physical Society, after being nominated by the Division of Particles and Fields in 1995, for her contributions to our understanding of a broad range of particle physics phenomena through experimentation and instrumentation development, and for her continued efforts to encourage participation in physics by high school students and under represented groups.

She graduated in 1964 from Cornell College, and received a PhD in physics from Yale University in 1969. Thompson died at age 61 in a car accident in Wood River, Illinois on August 16, 2004

== See also ==
- List of fellows of the American Physical Society (1972–1997)
