= Warren Bruce Jackson =

Warren Bruce Jackson from Xerox PARC, was awarded the status of Fellow in the American Physical Society, after they were nominated by their Division of Materials Physics in 1995, for pioneering research in the fundamental properties of amorphous semiconductors, including seminal studies of the intrinsic electronic density of states and metastable mechanisms and processes, and for the application of photothermal deflection spectroscopy to address a wide range of problems in hydrogenated amorphous silicon.

== See also ==
- List of fellows of the American Physical Society (1972–1997)
