= Werner Sandhas =

German physicist (1934–2021)

Werner Sandhas (14 April 1934 – 25 August 2021) was a German physicist at the University of Bonn.

== Life and career ==
Born in Berlin-Charlottenburg, he studied physics at the Free University, Berlin, gaining a Diploma in 1960 and becoming a Doctor of Science in 1963. After 2 years as a science collaborator at the Free University he was appointed assistant professor. He then moved to be assistant professor at the University of Bonn (1964-1968) and lecturer at Bonn (1968-1969) before moving to be Professor of Physics at the University of Mainz (1969-1973) and finally moving back as to be Professor of Physics and Co-director of the Physics Institute at Bonn since 1973.

He was awarded the status of Fellow in the American Physical Society, after he was nominated by their Topical Group on Few-Body Systems in 1990, for development of fundamental theoretical methods for the exact treatment of few-nucleon problems, including the development of methods for 3-, 4-, and n-particle scattering theory and methods for the inclusion of coulomb effects in the 3-particle problem.

Sandhas died on 25 August 2021, at the age of 87.

== See also ==
- List of fellows of the American Physical Society (1972–1997)
