= Gerald E. Marsh =

Gerald E. Marsh is a physicist, retired from Argonne National Laboratory, who has worked and published widely in the areas of science, nuclear power, and foreign affairs.

Marsh was a consultant to the U.S. Department of Defense on strategic nuclear technology and policy in the Reagan, Bush, and Clinton administrations, and served with the U.S. START delegation in Geneva.

Marsh was awarded the status of Fellow in the American Physical Society, after he was nominated by their Forum on Physics and Society in 1995, for more than fifteen years of technical-policy contributions to nuclear arms control issues, including the comprehensive test ban, strategic defense, nuclear-naval strategy, and information-security reform, all in addition to contributions in various areas of theoretical and applied physics.

== See also ==
- List of fellows of the American Physical Society (1972–1997)
