= James Robert Beene =

American physicist

James Robert Beene, from the Oak Ridge National Laboratory, was made a Fellow in the American Physical Society after being nominated by the Division of Nuclear Physics at ORNL in 1991.

Beene was recognized for his outstanding contributions and investigations in heavy ion nuclear physics, particularly studies of the nuclear giant resonance structures via Coulomb excitations, and their subsequent decay via photon and neutron emission with 4-TT detector systems.

== See also ==
- List of fellows of the American Physical Society (1972–1997)
