= Alan D. English =

Alan D. English of the DuPont Corporation was an American physicist.

He was awarded the status of Fellow in the American Physical Society, after being nominated by their Division of Polymer Physics in 1989, for contributions to the development of a description of polymer segmental dynamics from solid-state NMR data, which incorporates the variability of both spatial and temporal coordinates with temperature and is applicable to both semicrystalline and amorphous polymers.

== See also ==
- List of fellows of the American Physical Society (1972–1997)
