= Bretislav Victor Heinrich =

Bretislav Victor Heinrich from the Simon Fraser University, was awarded the status of Fellow in the American Physical Society, after they were nominated by their Forum on International Physics in 1995, for the elucidation of loss of ferromagnetic resonance in metals; for the contribution to the invention of ferromagnetic antiresonance; for adapting molecular beam epitaxy to studies of exchange interactions and anisotropies in the highest quality ultrathin magnetic films.

== See also ==
- List of fellows of the American Physical Society (1972–1997)
