= Elizabeth Garber =

American historian of science (1939-2020)

Elizabeth Anne Garber (1939–2020) was an American historian of science known for her work on James Clerk Maxwell and the history of physics. She was a professor of history for many years at Stony Brook University.

== Biography ==
Elizabeth Anne Wolfe was born in England in 1939. She studied mathematics, physics, and geology at the University of London. After moving to the United States and marrying physicist Donald Garber, she earned a Ph.D. from the Case Institute of Technology (now the Case Western Reserve University) with a dissertation on Maxwell. She became a faculty member at Stony Brook University, and retired in 2008.

Garber died from complications of Alzheimer's disease at home on July 1, 2020.

== Books ==
Garber was the author of:

- The Language of Physics: The Calculus and the Development of Theoretical Physics in Europe, 1750–1914 (Birkhäuser, 1999)

Garber co-edited several books collecting the works of James Clerk Maxwell:

- Maxwell on Saturn's Rings (edited with Stephen G. Brush and C. W. F. Everitt, MIT Press, 1983)
- Maxwell on Molecules and Gases (edited with Stephen G. Brush and C. W. F. Everitt, MIT Press, 1986)
- Maxwell on Heat and Statistical Mechanics: On "Avoiding All Personal Enquiries of Molecules" (edited with Stephen G. Brush and C. W. F. Everitt, Associated University Presses, 1995)

Garber also edited:

- Beyond History of Science: Essays in Honor of Robert E. Schofield (Lehigh University Press, 1990)

== Recognition ==
Garber was named a Fellow of the American Physical Society in 1989 "for her research in the history of physics, including the development of kinetic theory and molecular science in the 19th century."
