= Mikkel Borlaug Johnson =

American physicist

Mikkel Borlaug Johnson (born 2 January 1943) is an American physicist.

Born in Waynesboro, Virginia he was awarded a Bachelor of Science degree at Virginia Polytechnic Institute in 1966 and a Master of Science degree (1968) and Doctor of Philosophy at Carnegie Mellon University (1970). He became a staff member at the Los Alamos National Laboratory.

He was elected a Fellow of the American Physical Society in 1983, after being nominated by their Division of Nuclear Physics, for his contribution to the understanding of the connections between nuclear forces and macroscopic observables in nuclear systems, and for his contributions to the understanding of the interplay between nuclear structure and reaction dynamics in pion scattering.

== See also ==
- List of fellows of the American Physical Society (1972–1997)
