= Santosh Kumar Srivastava =

Santosh Kumar Srivastava from the California Institute of Technology, was awarded the status of Fellow in the American Physical Society, after they were nominated by their Division of Atomic, Molecular & Optical Physics in 1994, for contributions made to the field of electron-atom/molecule collision physics by developing experimental techniques to measure accurate collision cross sections and by generating a large body of cross section data for elastic and inelastic scattering, ionization and attachment.

== See also ==
- List of fellows of the American Physical Society (1972–1997)
