= Henry Philip Freund =

Henry Philip Freund from the Science Applications International Corporation, was awarded the status of Fellow in the American Physical Society, after they were nominated by their Division of Plasma Physics in 1997, for seminal contributions to the theory of collective radiation mechanisms in plasma and relativistic electron beans, and the application of the theory to runaway electron instabilities in tokamaks and to coherent radiation sources such as Free-Electron Lases and Cerenkov Masers.

== See also ==
- List of fellows of the American Physical Society (1972–1997)
