= Kenneth W. Gentle =

Kenneth W. Gentle from the University of Texas, Austin, was awarded the status of Fellow in the American Physical Society, after they were nominated by their Division of Plasma Physics in 1996, for his pioneering experiments on wave-particle and wave-wave interactions which have illuminated the fundamental nonlinear phenomena in collisionless plasmas, and for his leadership in the development of experiments which directly measure the fundamental processes of transport in Tokamak plasmas.

== See also ==
- List of fellows of the American Physical Society (1972–1997)
