= Patricia Mooney =

Physicist

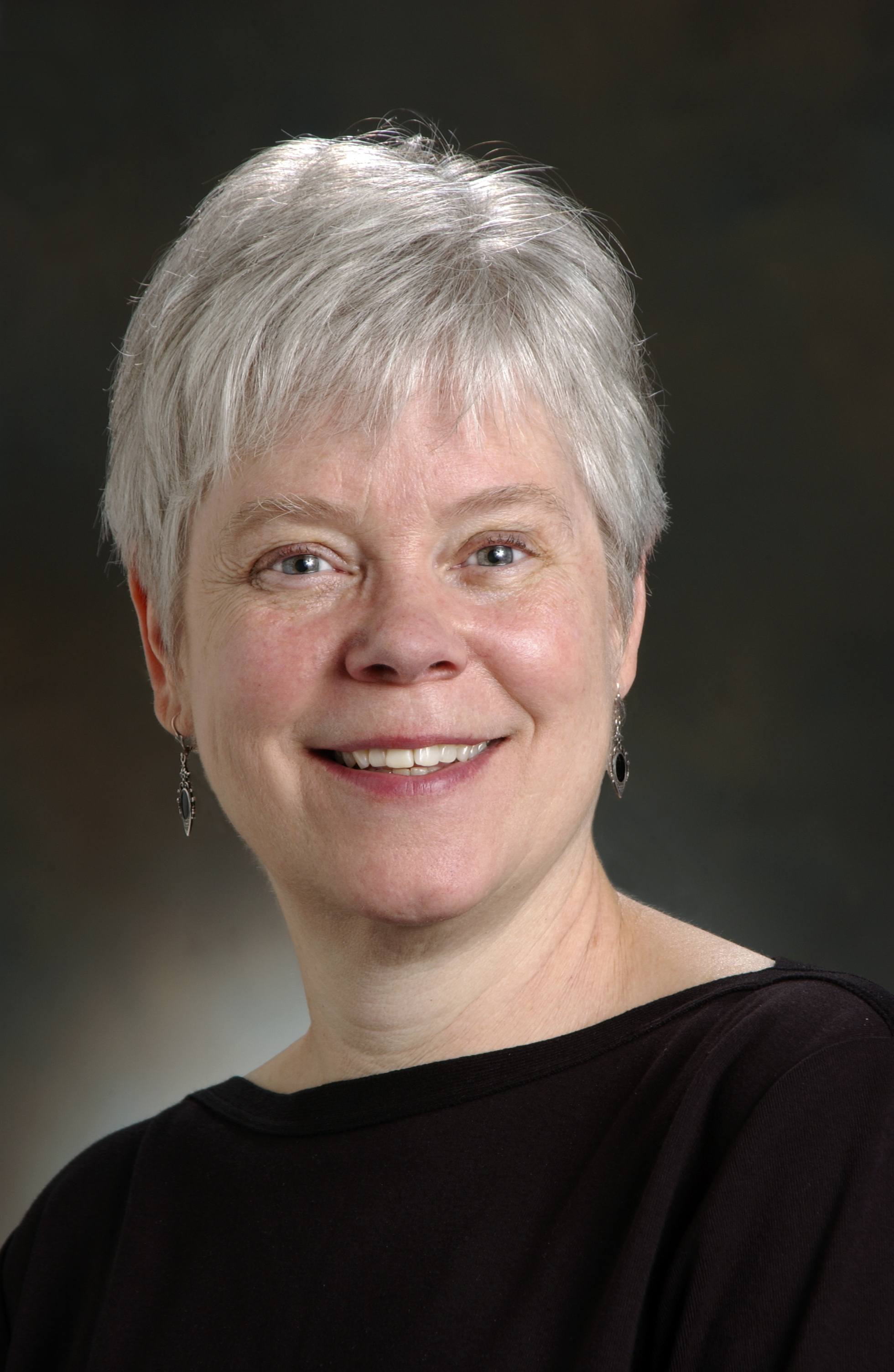
- Mooney in 2005

Academic background
- Education: B.A., Wilson College; M.A., PhD, Bryn Mawr College
- Thesis: Electrical measurements of the Pb/PbO solid electrolyte cell (1972)

Academic work
- Institutions: Hiram College; Vassar College; University at Albany, SUNY; Simon Fraser University

Patricia May Mooney FRSC MRS is a Professor Emerita of Physics at Simon Fraser University. She is a Fellow of the Royal Society of Canada, Materials Research Society, the American Association for the Advancement of Science, and the American Physical Society.

== Career ==
After earning her PhD, Mooney earned a position as an assistant professor of physics at Hiram College and Vassar College. She taught physics at Hiram for two years before moving to Vassar. From there, she was a senior research associate in the Physics Department at the University at Albany, SUNY, and was invited as a visiting scientist at the Groupe de Physique des Solide de l'ENS, Universit, de Paris VII, and at the Fraunhofer Institut fur Angewandte Festkrperphysik in Freiburg, Germany.

Mooney joined IBM T.J. Watson Research Center in 1980 as a research staff member. While there, she received two Outstanding Technical Achievement Awards. She eventually left in 2005 to become a Tier 1 Canada Research Chair in semiconductor physics at Simon Fraser University (SFU).

Internationally, she has sat on the International Advisory Committee on Defects in Semiconductors and Chaired the Gordon Research Conference on Defects in Semiconductors. In 2013, Mooney was elected a Fellow of the Royal Society of Canada and Materials Research Society.
