= Indrek Martinson =

Estonian-Swedish physicist

- Born: 26 December 1937; Tartu, Estonia
- Died: 14 November 2009 (aged 71); Södra Sandby, Scania, Sweden
- Occupation: Physicist
- Known for: Accelerator-based Atomic Physics
- Children: 3 (grandchildren. = 7 Including Hedvig, Ville, Matilda, Jonatan, Sara, Gustav, david

Indrek Martinson (1937– 14 November 2009) was an Estonian-born Swedish physicist.

In 1971 he defended his doctoral thesis at Stockholm University. He taught at Lund University (Emeritus Professor).

His main field of research was accelerator-based atomic physics.

== Awards ==
- 2001: Order of the White Star, IV class.
