= Vittorio Celli =

- Citizenship: Italy; United States
- Education: University of Pavia (PhD)
- Scientific career
- Fields: Physics
- Workplaces: University of Illinois; University of California, San Diego; University of Bologna; University of Virginia
- Thesis: (1958)
- Doctoral advisor: Franco Bassani
- Website: www.phys.virginia.edu/People/personal.asp?UID=vc

Vittorio Celli is a retired Italian-American theoretical physicist and a professor emeritus of the physics department at the University of Virginia. His specialty is condensed matter physics, particularly surface phenomena.

== Education and career ==
Celli completed his PhD at University of Pavia in 1958, under the supervision of Franco Bassani. He was made a Fellow of the American Physical Society in 1975.

Celli retired from academia in 2004.
