= Kenneth Ivan Golden =

American physicist

Kenneth Ivan Golden from the University of Vermont, was awarded the status of Fellow in the American Physical Society, after they were nominated by their Division of Plasma Physics in 1991, for pioneering work in the theory of dynamical processes in strongly coupled plasmas; for extending the theory to the analysis of binary ion mixtures and of two dimensional electron systems; for contributions to the theory of the structure of shock waves in magnetized plasmas.

== See also ==
- List of fellows of the American Physical Society (1972–1997)
