= Barbara Goss Levi =

American physics writer and editor

Barbara Suzanne Goss Levi (born 1943) is an American physicist, physics writer, and editor.

== Education and career ==
Levi is a graduate of Carleton College, where she majored in physics. She earned a Ph.D. in 1971 at Stanford University, concentrating in particle physics. Her dissertation, Low energy pion-nucleon scattering, was supported by the United States Atomic Energy Commission, and analyzed experimental data from the SLAC National Accelerator Laboratory.

She was a faculty member in physics at Fairleigh Dickinson University from 1970 to 1976, and at Georgia Tech from 1976 to 1980. She also consulted for the congressional Office of Technology Assessment through its period of operation from the 1970s until its closure in 1995, and was a researcher in arms control at Princeton University in the Center for Energy and Environmental Studies from 1981 to 1987, with a year on leave at Bell Labs. She was a visiting professor at Rutgers University in 1988–1989, and in the same years chaired the Forum on Physics and Society of the American Physical Society (APS).

Meanwhile, she became an assistant editor for the American Institute of Physics in 1969. After completing her doctorate, she continued at the American Institute of Physics as consulting editor from 1971 to 1987, associate editor from 1987 to 1988, and senior associate editor from 1989 to 1992, before becoming senior editor in 1992. During this period, she was a regular columnist for the Institute's magazine Physics Today, and edited the magazine's news section. She stepped down as senior editor in 2003, continuing as a contributing editor.

== Books ==
Levi is the editor of books including:

- The Future of Land Based-Strategic Missiles (with Mark Sakitt and Art Hobson, American Institute of Physics, 1989)
- Global Warming: Physics and Facts (with David W. Hafemeister and Richard Scribner, American Institute of Physics, 1992)

== Recognition ==
Levi was named a Fellow of the American Physical Society in 1991, after a nomination from the APS Forum on Physics and Society, "for her objective analyses and expositions of the physics behind many nuclear weapons issues, and for her lucid explanations of current research for the readers of Physics Today". She was also elected as a Fellow of the American Association for the Advancement of Science in 1992.
