= Hubert E. King Jr. =

American Condensed-Matter Physicist

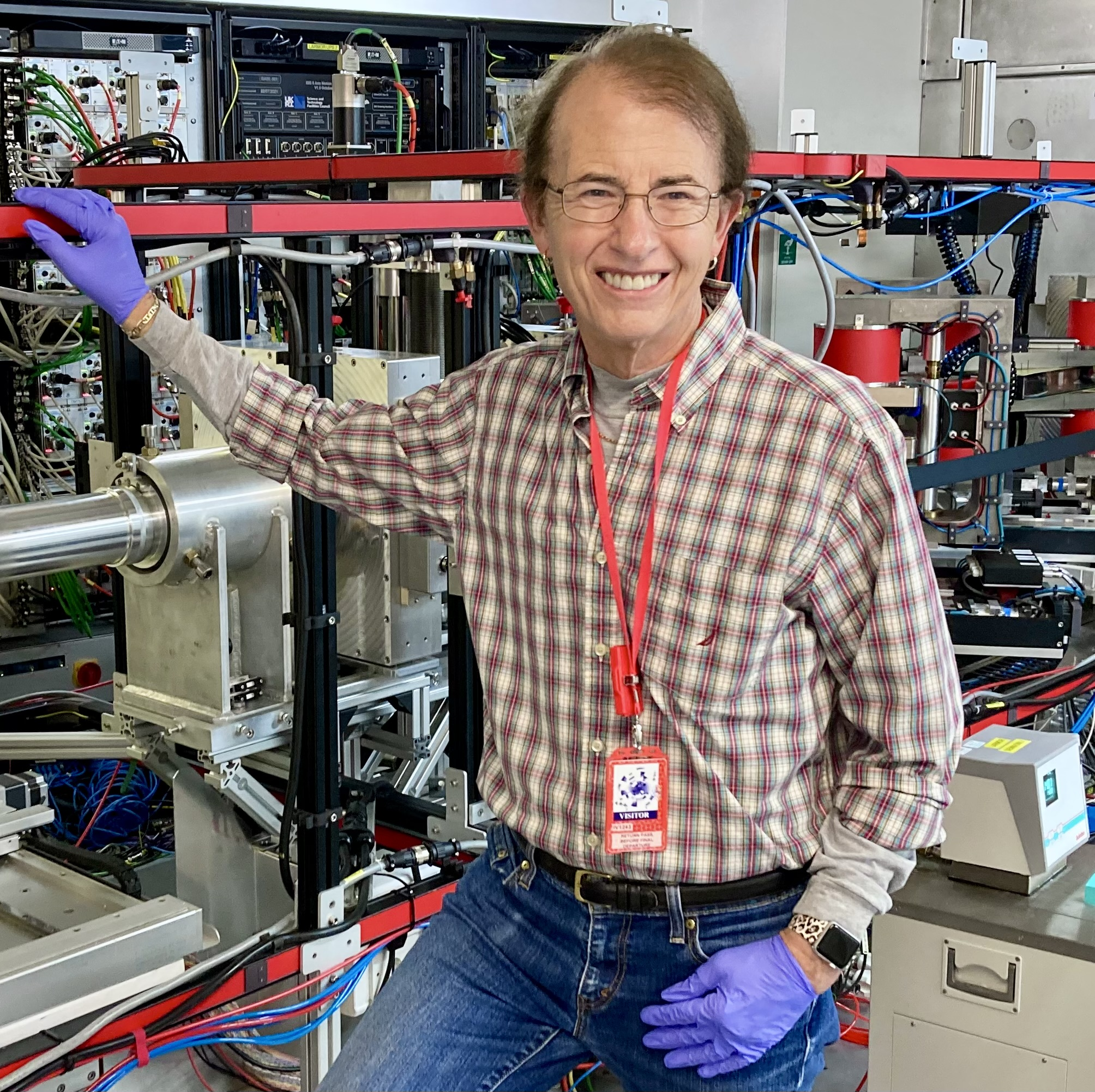
Hubert E. King Jr. at Larmor instrument, ISIS Neutron and Muon Source, Rutherford Appleton Laboratory.

Hubert Ellis King Jr. is an American physicist known for experimental studies of materials under extreme conditions and in complex environments. He worked at three major U.S. industrial research laboratories—Bell Laboratories, IBM Research, and ExxonMobil Corporate Strategic Research—where he applied techniques including high-pressure experimental methods, neutron scattering, and synchrotron X-ray crystallography to problems in liquids, complex fluids, and porous geological systems relevant to energy technologies.

== Early life and education ==
A native of Kentucky, King studied geology at the University of Kentucky before pursuing doctoral research at Stony Brook University, where he received a Ph.D. in Earth and Space Science in 1979 under crystallographer Charles T. Prewitt. His doctoral research included studies of high-pressure and high-temperature polymorphism in iron sulfide (FeS).

== Career ==
Early in his career King conducted research in high-pressure condensed-matter physics at Bell Laboratories, working in the research environment of physicist Aiyasami Jayaraman. His work included development of experimental methods for high-pressure crystallography, including diamond-anvil cell techniques and diffracted-beam crystal centering.

Following completion of his doctoral studies, King held a postdoctoral fellowship at IBM's T. J. Watson Research Center. During this period he conducted experimental investigations of crystalline and electronic materials under elevated pressure using X-ray diffraction and elastic property measurements. This work included studies of intermediate-valence and Kondo systems in rare-earth compounds.

In 1982 King joined Exxon Research and Engineering, later part of ExxonMobil Research and Engineering, where he spent nearly four decades conducting fundamental and applied research in materials physics and energy science, rising to the position of Distinguished Research Associate. His 39-year career at ExxonMobil resulted in more than 140 peer-reviewed publications and 10 granted patents.

== Research contributions ==
Across his career, King's work has centered on experimental studies of materials under constrained conditions, including extreme pressures, complex fluid environments, and porous geological structures. Using advanced scattering and high-pressure experimental methods, his research explored how structure and dynamics emerge in materials when pushed beyond ordinary conditions.

His early work focused on crystalline materials subjected to high pressure using X-ray diffraction techniques. A study reported the crystal structures of low-temperature quartz-type phases of SiO₂ and GeO₂ at elevated pressure. King also contributed to studies of electronic materials and correlated electron systems during the early development of high-temperature superconductivity research, including work on antiferromagnetism in La₂CuO₄. He later conducted experimental studies of liquids and glass-forming materials under extreme pressure. Research on high-pressure viscosity in glycerol demonstrated methods for probing liquid transport properties under extreme conditions. In later work he applied neutron scattering and synchrotron X-ray techniques to complex industrial and geological materials, including catalysts, hydrocarbons, polymer additives, and porous reservoir rocks. He invented polymer additive technologies for crystallization control in alkane and gas-hydrate systems and developed geochemical evaluation methods.

== Recognition ==
King was elected Fellow of the American Physical Society in 1994. The APS citation recognized his contributions to "the structure and dynamics of liquids under extreme pressure".

In 2018 he was elected Fellow of the Neutron Scattering Society of America (NSSA). The NSSA citation recognized his work "for creative application of neutron scattering to address a broad range of problems from shale gas recovery to diesel fuel additives, demonstrating the importance of neutron science to solving industrial challenges".

His career has been documented in an oral-history interview conducted by the American Institute of Physics Center for History of Physics as part of its History of Physicists in Industry project.

== Selected publications ==
- King, H. E.; Finger, L. W. (1979). "Diffracted beam crystal centering and its application to high-pressure crystallography." Journal of Applied Crystallography, 12(4), 374–378.
- Vaknin, D.; Sinha, S. K.; Moncton, D. E.; Johnston, D. C.; Newsam, J. M.; Safinya, C. R.; King, H. E. (1987). "Antiferromagnetism in La₂CuO₄." Physical Review Letters, 58(26), 2802.
- Glinnemann, J.; King, H. E.; et al. (1992). "Crystal structures of the low-temperature quartz-type phases of SiO₂ and GeO₂ at elevated pressure." Zeitschrift für Kristallographie, 198, 177–212.
- Herbst, C.; Cook, R.; King, H. E. (1993). "High-pressure viscosity of glycerol measured by centrifugal-force viscometry." Nature, 361(6412), 518–520.
- King, H. E.; Prewitt, C. T. (1982). "High-pressure and high-temperature polymorphism of iron sulfide (FeS)." Acta Crystallographica Section B, 38(7), 1877–1887.
