= Daniel R. Marlow =

Canadian physicist (born 1954)

Daniel Robert Marlow (born 1954) is a Canadian physicist and fellow of the American Physical Society. A member of the Princeton University faculty since 1984, Marlow is now an emeritus professor of physics.

== Early life and education ==
Daniel Marlow was born in Ottawa, Canada, in 1954; his father in the Royal Canadian Navy, so their family moved multiple times while he was growing up. They finally moved to Doylestown, Pennsylvania, where he attended junior high and high school. Marlow attended Carnegie Mellon University in Pittsburgh, eventually graduating with a B.S. and a Ph.D. in physics. From 1980 to 1983, he was a research staffer at Carnegie Mellon, and from 1983 to 1984 he served as an assistant professor.

== Career ==
In 1984, Marlow joined Princeton University as an assistant professor, receiving successive promotions and becoming Professor of Physics in 1995. From 2001 to 2008, Marlow served as the department chair for physics. In 2011, he became Evans Crawford 1911 Professor of Physics. In 2024, Princeton announced Marlow's transition to emeritus status, effective September 1.

== Research ==
Marlow's work includes research on high energy physics; in 2018, Marlow was one of 77 researchers to win research funding towards high energy physics from the U.S. Department of Energy. In 2019, Marlow was the faculty advisor to a project that created a satellite powered by plasma.

Marlow also contributed to technology aimed at managing COVID-19. In 2020, a group of researchers designed a ventilator for use on COVID patients that can be readily produced to alleviate the stress on ventilator production and distribution. Their design became FDA approved. Their device was successfully implemented at Penn Medicine hospitals.
