= Sarah E. Petrie =

Canadian and American chemist

Sarah Elaine B. Petrie is a Canadian and American physical chemist who worked for the research laboratories of Eastman Kodak and became known for her research on the thermal properties of glasses, polymers, and liquid crystals.

Petrie earned a Ph.D. in chemistry in 1957 from the University of Toronto, with the dissertation Dielectric behaviour of vapours adsorbed on porous and non-porous adsorbents, supervised by Robert L. McIntosh. By the same year she was working for the Kodak Research Laboratories. In 1977 she was appointed to a panel on polymers in the National Bureau of Standards and as an advisor to the office of chemistry and chemical technology of the National Research Council. She also served as a councilor to the American Chemical Society Division of Polymer Chemistry from 1979 to 1981. By 1994, when she served on the Committee on Polymer Science and Engineering of the National Research Council, she was listed as retired from Kodak.

In 1976, Petrie was named a Fellow of the American Physical Society (APS), after a nomination from the APS Division of Polymer Physics.
