= Rudolph C. Hwa =

American theoretical physicist

Rudolph C. Hwa Professor emeritus
- 华家照
- Born: Hwa Chia-chao; November 1, 1931 (age 95)
- Other name: Rudy Hwa
- Citizenship: American

Academic background
- Education: B.S., M.S., Ph.D. in Engineering, University of Illinois Urbana; Ph.D., Physics, Brown University
- Thesis: Study of pion-hyperon resonances by dispersion relations in the unphysical sheet
- Doctoral advisor: David Feldman

Rudolph C. Hwa (born November 1, 1931) is an American theoretical physicist and Professor emeritus at the University of Oregon. His areas of interest include the strong interaction, nonlinear dynamics, fluctuations, and quark–gluon plasma. He was elected an American Physical Society Fellow in 1995.

== Early life and education ==
Hwa Chia-chao was born in Shanghai, China, in 1931. He arrived in the United States in 1949, and became a naturalized citizen in San Francisco in 1962.

He completed three degrees in electrical engineering at the University of Illinois Urbana: a B.S. in 1952, an M.S. in 1953, and a Ph.D. in 1957. Hwa earned his 1962 Ph.D. in physics at Brown University, with a dissertation titled, Study of pion-hyperon resonances by dispersion relations in the unphysical sheet, advised by David Feldman.

== Career ==
Between 1962 and 1966, Hwa held research positions at the Lawrence Radiation Laboratory and at the Institute for Advanced Study, Princeton. His first faculty position was at the Institute for Theoretical Physics at State University of New York at Stony Brook, and he joined the faculty of the University of Oregon in 1971. He was named professor emeritus in 1997.

== Selected publications ==
=== Books ===
- Hwa, Rudolph C.; Teplitz, Vigdor L. (1966). Homology and Feynman integrals (The Mathematical physics monograph series). W. A. Benjamin. ASIN B0006BOKU4.
- Hwa, R.C. (1990). Quark-Gluon Plasma (Advanced Directions in High Energy Physics). World Scientific Publishing Co. Pte. Ltd. ISBN 978-9971509002.
- Hwa, Rudolph C. (1995). Quark-gluon plasma 2. Singapore; River Edge, N.J.: World Scientific Publishing Co. Pte. Ltd. ISBN 978-981-02-2399-1. OCLC 33079600.
- Hwa, R. C.; Xin-Nian, Wang, eds. (2004). Quark-Gluon Plasma 3. World Scientific Publishing Co. Pte. Ltd. ISBN 978-9812380777.
- Hwa, R.C.; Wang, Xin-Niang, eds. (2010). Quark-gluon plasma 4. World Scientific Publishing Co. Pte. Ltd. ISBN 978-9814293280.

=== Articles ===
- Das, K. P., & Hwa, R. C. (1977). Quark-antiquark recombination in the fragmentation region. Physics Letters B, 68(5), 459-462.
- Hwa, R. C., & Yang, C. B. (2003). Scaling behavior at high p T and the p/π ratio. Physical Review C, 67(3), 034902.
- Hwa, R. C. (1990). Fractal measures in multiparticle production. Physical Review D, 41(5), 1456.
- Hwa, R. C., & Yang, C. B. (2004). Recombination of shower partons at high p T in heavy-ion collisions. Physical Review C, 70(2), 024905.
- Hwa, R. C., & Kajantie, K. (1985). Diagnosing quark matter by measuring the total entropy and the photon or dilepton emission rates. Physical Review D, 32(5), 1109.
- Hwa, R. C., & Ferree, T. C. (2002). Scaling properties of fluctuations in the human electroencephalogram. Physical Review E, 66(2), 021901.
- Hwa, R. C. (1980). Clustering and hadronization of quarks: A treatment of the low-p T problem. Physical Review D, 22(7), 1593.

== Awards and honors ==
- 1995 Fellow, American Physical Society, "For contributions to the study of soft hadronic processes in high energy collisions, signatures of quark gluon plasma, fractal structure in multiparticle production and phase transition."
- 2008 Outstanding Referee, American Physical Society
