= Mary L. Mandich =

American chemist

Mary L. Mandich–Steigerwald is a retired physical chemistry researcher in the telecommunications industry, including working as a Distinguished Member of Technical Staff at Bell Labs and at Nokia. As well as her work as a chemist, she is also a trainer of Welsh Springer Spaniel dogs.

Mandich majored in cellular biology at the University of Michigan, and completed her Ph.D. in physical chemistry at Columbia University.

In 1997 she was named a Fellow of the American Physical Society (APS), after a nomination from the APS Division of Atomic, Molecular and Optical Physics, "for the development and application of unique molecular beam and spectroscopic tools for the study of the electronic properties and chemistry of clusters".
