= Robert Sekerka =

American physicist (born 1937)

Robert Sekerka (born 1937) is an American physicist who is currently the University Professor Emeritus at Carnegie Mellon University.
