= Winthrop W. Smith =

Winthrop W. Smith (Aug. 8, 1936 - Apr. 7, 2025) was an American physicist.

Smith studied physics at Amherst College, completing his degree in 1958, and subsequently pursued a doctorate in the subject at Massachusetts Institute of Technology, which he earned in 1963. Smith began teaching at Columbia University as an instructor, and was appointed to an assistant professorship before he joined the University of Connecticut faculty as an associate professor in 1969. From 1975 to 2009, Smith held a full professorship at UConn. Upon retirement, he was granted emeritus status. In 1973, Smith was elected a fellow of the American Physical Society.

Smith died on April 7, 2025, in Peabody, MA.
