= Robert Nemanich =

American physicist

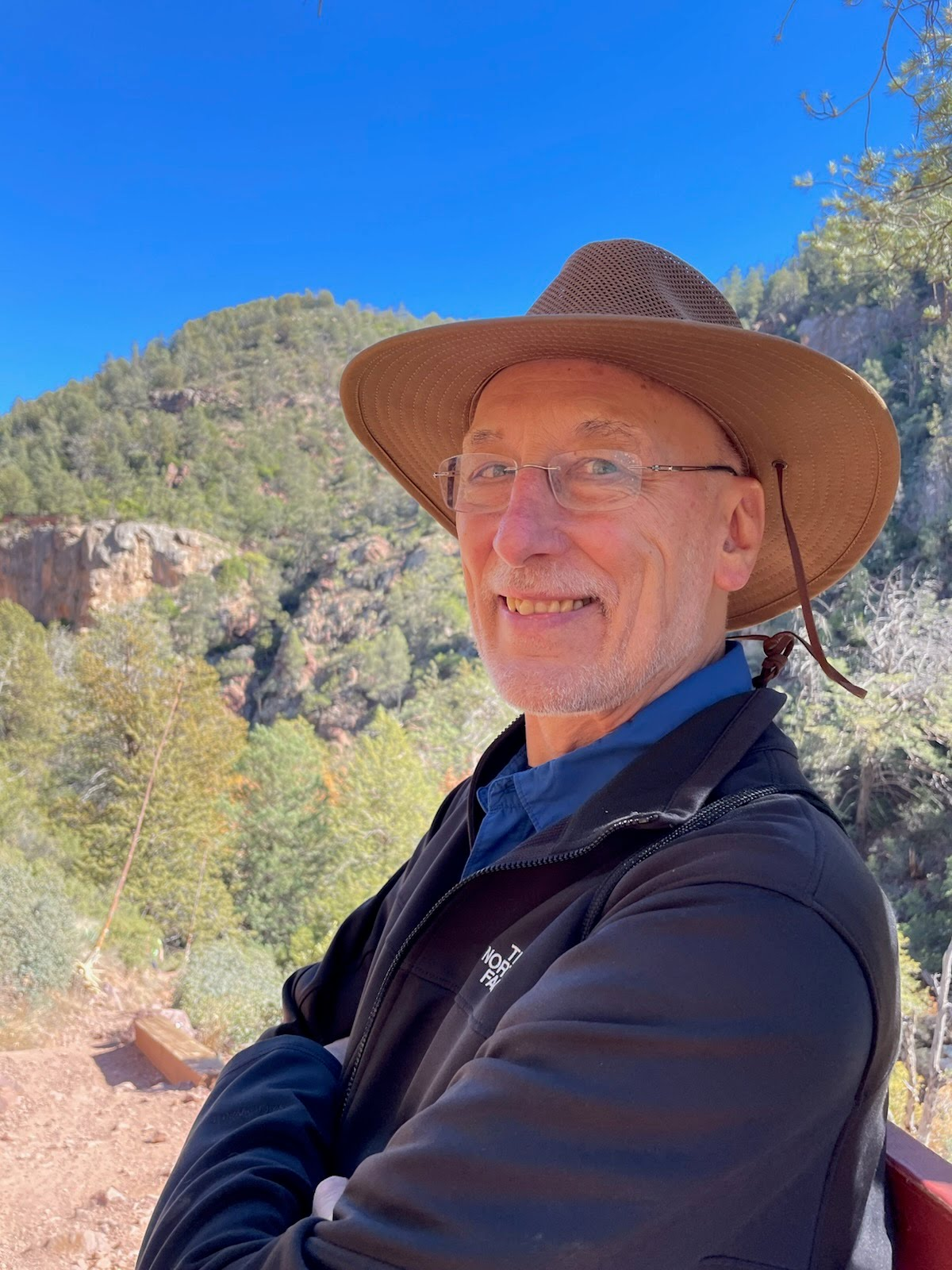
American physicist Robert Nemanich in 2023.

Robert John Nemanich is an American physicist.

Nemanich attended Northern Illinois University, where he obtained bachelor's and master's degrees in physics, then continued studying the subject at the University of Chicago. After completing his doctorate in 1977, Nemanich began his teaching career at North Carolina State University, then moved to Arizona State University. He was elected a fellow of the American Physical Society in 1993 "[f]or his contributions to the application of Raman spectroscopy to the study of atomic structure in semiconducting thin films and interfaces." In 2016, Arizona State University awarded Nemanich a Regents' Professorship.
