= Donald F. Geesaman =

Physicist

Donald Geesaman is a Senior Physicist and a former Director of the Physics Division at Argonne National Laboratory. He received his B.S. (1971) from the Colorado School of Mines and M.A. and Ph.D. (1976) from the State University of New York at Stony Brook. After his Ph.D. he joined Argonne National Laboratory and was promoted to Senior Physicist in 1991. He retired from the Argonne National Laboratory in 2017 where he was a Distinguished Argonne Fellow and a former Director of the Physics Division.

He was elected a Fellow of the American Physical Society in 1993 for "outstanding work on inelastic pion scattering, on the propagation of nucleons in the nuclear medium, and on parton distributions of nucleons in nuclei through deep-inelastic muon scattering". He became a Fellow of the American Association for the Advancement of Science in the same year, and was elected the Chair of the Division of Nuclear Physics of the APS for 2004-2005. He was an Associate Editor of Physical Review C and is currently an Editor of Physics Letters B. Dr. Geesaman's recent research focuses on understanding the implications of nucleon substructure in nuclear physics and on understanding the structure of nuclei. He is the author of more than 100 scientific publications.
