= Hermann Grimmeiss =

German-Swedish physicist (born 1930)

Hermann Grimmeiss (born 19 August 1930), is a German-Swedish physicist. He became the first professor of solid-state physics at Lund University in 1965, and he held his post until his retirement in 1996. He became an important part of the Department of Physics and focused his research on electrical and photoelectric studies of semiconductor defects.

He was elected as a member of the Royal Swedish Academy of Engineering Sciences in 1977, the Royal Swedish Academy of Sciences in 1978 and the Finnish Society of Sciences and Letters in 1980.

In 1989 he was elected a Fellow of the American Physical Society "for experimental investigations of impurities in semiconductors through the innovative use of a wide range of techniques".
