= Yitzhak Maron =

- יצחק מרון
- Born: 1949 (age 76–77); Baghdad
- Citizenship: Israeli
- Education: B.Sc. (Weizmann Institute of Science, 1968); M.Sc. (Hebrew University of Jerusalem, 1970); Ph.D. (Weizmann Institute of Science, 1977)
- Spouse: Liora Maron
- Children: 3
- Awards: IEEE PSAC Award (2007); APS John Dawson Award (2009)
- Scientific career
- Fields: Plasma physics
- Institutions: Weizmann Institute of Science
- Website: WIS Plasma Laboratory

Yitzhak Maron (Hebrew: יצחק מרון) is a plasma physicist and a professor at the Weizmann Institute of Science. He is known for pioneering spectroscopic techniques to measure and characterize plasmas under extreme conditions (e.g. high-current, high-voltage, high-fields, short-duration) which won him the 2007 IEEE Plasma Science and Applications (PSAC) Award and the 2009 John Dawson Award for Excellence in Plasma Physics Research.

== Early life and education ==
Maron obtained a Ph.D. in Physics from the Weizmann Institute of Science in 1977. Upon graduation, he remained at the institution and worked as a postdoctoral fellow until 1980. He then moved to the Laboratory of Plasma Studies at Cornell University and became a Research Associate until 1984. Maron eventually returned to the Weizmann Institute of Science (WIS) as a professor in the Faculty of Physics and became head of the WIS Plasma Laboratory.

== Honours and awards ==
Maron was inducted as a fellow of the American Physical Society in 1996 and the Institute of Electrical and Electronics Engineers (IEEE) in 2003.
