= Susan Seestrom =

American physicist

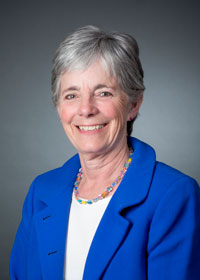

Susan Joyce Seestrom is an American experimental nuclear physicist and physics administrator, the Chief Research Officer at Sandia National Laboratories. Before moving to Sandia, she was the first female head of the Physics Division and the Weapons Physics Directorate at the Los Alamos National Laboratory, and she became the first female chair of the Nuclear Science Advisory Committee of the Department of Energy and National Science Foundation. She is known for her research on neutrons and particularly on ultracold neutrons.

== Education and career ==
Seestrom was one of four children of an electrical contractor in Minnesota, and was part of the first generation of her family to attend college, at the University of Minnesota. There, she started out majoring in geology before switching to physics. She remained at the University of Minnesota for graduate study, completing a Ph.D. in nuclear physics in 1981.

While still a graduate student, she became a researcher at the Los Alamos National Laboratory in the late 1970s, and worked there for over 30 years. She became head of the Physics Division in 2001, was Associate Laboratory Director for Weapons Physics beginning in 2004, and was Associate Laboratory Director for Experimental Physical Sciences beginning in 2006, holding both positions until 2013 when she moved to Sandia. At Sandia, she became Associate Laboratories Director for Advanced Science and Technology and Chief Research Officer in 2017.

She also chaired the Division of Nuclear Physics of the American Physical Society in 2006–2007, and chaired the Nuclear Science Advisory Committee from 2009 to 2012.

== Recognition ==
Seestrom was named a Fellow of the American Physical Society in 1994, after a nomination from the Division of Nuclear Physics, "for experimental studies of the nuclear isospin response in inelastic pion scattering, and for her contributions to our understanding of parity violation in compound nucleus neutron resonance". She was elected as a Fellow of the American Association for the Advancement of Science in 2020, "for her pathbreaking work in nuclear physics, especially using ultracold neutrons, and her leadership, both in her community and at national laboratories".
