= Chun Wa Wong =

Chun Wa Wong is a physicist.

Wong earned a Bachelor of Science from the University of California, Los Angeles in 1959, followed by a Master of Arts and PhD at Harvard University in 1960 and 1965, respectively. He returned to UCLA as faculty and was granted emeritus status upon retirement. Wong was elected a fellow of the American Physical Society in 1977.
