= Carmen Ortiz (physicist) =

Spanish and American optimal memory specialist

María del Carmen Ortiz Llorens is a Spanish and American physicist specializing in optics, optical storage, and the application of lasers in manufacturing thin films.

== Education and career ==
Ortiz was born in 1947 in Madrid; her father was from Aragon. After a 1970 physics degree from the Complutense University of Madrid, she obtained a scholarship to continue her studies at the Max Planck Institute for Metals Research (Metallforschung) in Stuttgart, Germany, and completed a doctorate through the University of Stuttgart in 1974. She continued as a short-term researcher in several research institutes in Germany and, from 1979 to 1981, at the IBM Research Center in Almaden Valley, San Jose, California.

Returning to Madrid, she became a researcher and head of a research group in optics for the Spanish National Research Council. However, in the later 1980s she returned to IBM Almaden, in part because of a two-body problem with her husband, superconductor expert Jerry Torrance, whom she had met in Stuttgart.

== Recognition ==
Ortiz was elected as a Fellow of the American Physical Society (APS) in 1995, after a nomination from the APS Division of Materials Physics, "for her sustained contributions to the understanding of the materials science underlying the thin films essential to optical and magnetic applications".
