= William Hoffmann (scientist) =

American physicist

William F. Hoffmann is a physicist in the University of Arizona who was awarded the status of Fellow from the American Physical Society in 1997 "For his pioneering work in the field of balloon-borne far-infrared astronomy and discovery of far-infrared radiation from Galactic Center; successful construction of the Multi Mirror Telescope (MMT) and application of infrared array technology to astronomy."
