= John Lawrence Freeouf =

American physicist and professor

- Born: 1947 (age 78–79)
- Education: University of Chicago
- Awards: Fellow, American Physical Society; Fellow, American Vacuum Society
- Scientific career
- Fields: Materials science
- Workplaces: Harvard University; Interface Studies Inc.; Portland State University
- Thesis: Far-Ultraviolet Reflectance of ll-Vl Compounds and Correlation with Penn-Phillips Gap
- Doctoral advisor: Hellmut Fritzsche

John Lawrence Freeouf (born 1947) is a materials scientist on the physics faculty of Portland State University. He is a Fellow of the American Physical Society and a Fellow of the American Vacuum Society. He has patented multiple inventions.

== Early life and education ==
Freeouf was born in Lincoln, Nebraska in 1947, the son of Leslie J. Freeouf and Janet Harriet (née Hodges) Freeouf. He married Barbara Curcic in 1975, and they have two daughters, Jennifer and Michellle.

Freeouf earned a baccalaureate degree in physics at the University of Arizona in 1967. At the University of Chicago he completed both a Master of Science in physics in 1968, and also a Ph.D. in physics in 1973, with his dissertation titled Far-Ultraviolet Reflectance of ll-Vl Compounds and Correlation with Penn-Phillips Gap, advised by Hellmut Fritzsche.

== Career ==
From 1972 to 1973, Freeouf was a research fellow at Harvard University, Cambridge, Massachusetts.

He was a research staff member at the International Business Machines Corporation Research Center, Yorktown Heights, New York, for two decades, from 1973 to 1993. He chaired the 1991 Electronic Materials and Photonics Division of the American Vacuum Society, and is a past Chairman of the Division of Electronic Materials and Processing of the American Vacuum Society. Hed became a Fellow of the American Vacuum Society in 1993.

He left IBM in 1993 to found Interface Studies Inc., in Katonah, New York, serving as president and chief scientist of the company, "that specializes in materials-science problems primarily related to semiconductor technology". He became a Professor on the Physics Department faculty of Portland State University in 2000.

== Honors and awards ==
- Freehouf, a 1990 recipient of an American Physical Society fellowship, in the Division of Condensed Matter Physics, was cited For application of surface-science techniques to the elucidation of semiconductor interfaces and for contributions to the physics of surface barriers.
- Freeouf chaired the EMPD division of the American Vacuum Society in 1991, became a Fellow of the American Vacuum Society in 1993, and was listed as a member of the AVS Forty Year Club in 2020.

== Selected publications ==
- Freeouf, John L. (1973-04-15). "Far-Ultraviolet Reflectance of II-VI Compounds and Correlation with the Penn—Phillips Gap". Physical Review B. 7 (8): 3810–3830. doi:10.1103/PhysRevB.7.3810. ISSN 0556-2805.
- Eastman, D. E.; Freeouf, J. L. (1975-02-17). "Photoemission Partial State Densities of Overlapping p and d States for NiO, CoO, FeO, MnO, and Cr 2 O 3". Physical Review Letters. 34 (7): 395–398. doi:10.1103/PhysRevLett.34.395. ISSN 0031-9007.
- Woodall, J. M.; Freeouf, J. L.; Pettit, G. D.; Jackson, T.; Kirchner, P. (1981-09-01). "Ohmic contacts to n -GaAs using graded band gap layers of Ga1− x In x As grown by molecular beam epitaxy". Journal of Vacuum Science and Technology. 19 (3): 626–627. doi:10.1116/1.571074. ISSN 0022-5355.
- Freeouf, J. L.; Woodall, J. M. (1981-11-01). "Schottky barriers: An effective work function model". Applied Physics Letters. 39 (9): 727–729. doi:10.1063/1.92863. ISSN 0003-6951.
- Freeouf, J. L.; Jackson, T. N.; Laux, S. E.; Woodall, J. M. (1982-04-01). "Effective barrier heights of mixed phase contacts: Size effects". Applied Physics Letters. 40 (7): 634–636. doi:10.1063/1.93171. ISSN 0003-6951.
- Warren, A. C.; Woodall, J. M.; Freeouf, J. L.; Grischkowsky, D.; McInturff, D. T.; Melloch, M. R.; Otsuka, N. (1990-09-24). "Arsenic precipitates and the semi-insulating properties of GaAs buffer layers grown by low-temperature molecular beam epitaxy". Applied Physics Letters. 57 (13): 1331–1333. doi:10.1063/1.103474. ISSN 0003-6951.
- Melloch, M. R.; Otsuka, N.; Woodall, J. M.; Warren, A. C.; Freeouf, J. L. (1990-10-08). "Formation of arsenic precipitates in GaAs buffer layers grown by molecular beam epitaxy at low substrate temperatures". Applied Physics Letters. 57 (15): 1531–1533. doi:10.1063/1.103343. ISSN 0003-6951.
- Lim, Seung-Gu; Kriventsov, Stas; Jackson, Thomas N.; Haeni, J. H.; Schlom, D. G.; Balbashov, A. M.; Uecker, R.; Reiche, P.; Freeouf, J. L.; Lucovsky, G. (2002-04-01). "Dielectric functions and optical bandgaps of high-K dielectrics for metal-oxide-semiconductor field-effect transistors by far ultraviolet spectroscopic ellipsometry". Journal of Applied Physics. 91 (7): 4500–4505. doi:10.1063/1.1456246. ISSN 0021-8979.
- Edge, L. F.; Schlom, D. G.; Chambers, S. A.; Cicerrella, E.; Freeouf, J. L.; Holländer, B.; Schubert, J. (2004-02-02). "Measurement of the band offsets between amorphous LaAlO3 and silicon". Applied Physics Letters. 84 (5): 726–728. doi:10.1063/1.1644055. ISSN 0003-6951.

== Patents ==
1. IT8024614A0, Freeouf, John Lawrence & Macpherson, Woodall Jerry, "Immagazzinamento di combustibile idrogeno", issued 1980-09-12
2. EP0039774A1, Freeouf, John Lawrence; Haag, William John & Woodall, Jerry Mcpherson, "Refractory structure and process for making it", issued 1981-11-18
3. EP0108910A2, Freeouf, John Lawrence; Jackson, Thomas Nelson & Oelhafen, Peter University Of Basel et al., "Method of forming a passivated compound semiconductor substrate", issued 1984-05-23
4. EP0200422A2, Freeouf, John Lawrence; Jackson, Thomas Nelson & Kirchner, Peter Daniel et al., "A transistor device", issued 1986-11-05
5. EP0202755A1, Freeouf, John Lawrence; Jackson, Thomas Nelson & Kirchner, Peter Daniel, "Double heterojunction field effect transistor data storage device", issued 1986-11-26
6. EP0170800B1, Freeouf, John Lawrence & Jackson, Thomas Nelson, "Heater assembly for molecular beam epitaxy furnace", issued 1987-09-16
7. EP0106044B1, Freeouf, John Lawrence; Jackson, Thomas Nelson & Laux, Steven Eric et al., "Space charge modulating semiconductor device and circuit comprising it", issued 1991-07-17
8. US4366493A, Freeouf, John Lawrence, "Semiconductor ballistic electron velocity control structure", issued 1991-09-17
9. US5508829, Freeouf, John Lawrence, "LTG AlGaAs non-linear optical material and devices fabricated therefrom", issued 1996-04-16
10. US6166318, Freeouf, John Lawrence, "Single absorber layer radiated energy conversion device", issued 1998-03-03
11. US6180432, Freeouf, John Lawrence, "Fabrication of single absorber layer radiated energy conversion device", issued 2000-04-10
12. US6191465B1, Freeouf, John Lawrence, "Solid state radiation detector", issued 2001-02-20
13. US6222199B1, Freeouf, John Lawrence, "Ultrathin layer measurement having a controlled ambient of light path", issued 2001-04-24
14. US6323947B1, Freeouf, John Lawrence, "Angle of incidence accuracy in ultrathin dielectric layer ellipsometry measurement", issued 2001-11-27
15. US6414302B1, Freeouf, John Lawrence, "High photon energy range reflected light characterization of solids", issued 2002-07-02
16. US7435953B2, Freeouf, John Lawrence, "Quadrupole mass filter length selection", issued 2008-10-14
