= Medard W. Welch Award =

The Medard W. Welch Award is given to scientists who demonstrated outstanding research in the fields pertinent to the focus areas of the American Vacuum Society, which are "the basic science, technology development, and commercialization of materials, interfaces, and processing." It was established in 1969 in memory of Medard W. Welch, a founder of the American Vacuum Society.

== List of recipients ==
Year	Recipient	Citation
2023	Sergei Kalinin	"In recognition of transformational contributions to atomic- and nanoscale control of matter and development of machine-learning driven automated microscopy"
2022	Susan B. Sinnott	"For outstanding contributions to the development and utilization of computational methods to advance atomic-scale insights into the mechanisms associated with surface chemistry, thin-film growth, and materials discovery"
2021	Tony F. Heinz	"For seminal contributions to the field of 2D materials, including the ground-breaking discoveries of the distinctive electronic and optical properties of atomically thin two-dimensional semiconductors"
2020	Mark Hersam	"for pioneering contributions to the synthesis, surface science, chemical functionalization, and application of low-dimensional nanoelectronic materials"
2019	Scott A. Chambers	“For pioneering contributions to understanding the origin and influence of heterogeneities, defects, and disorder in complex oxide epitaxial films and heterostructures"
2018	David Castner	“For leading advances in rigorous and state-of-the-art surface analysis methods applied to organic and biological samples"
2017	Hans-Peter Steinrück	"For his pioneering studies on the properties and reactivity of the surfaces of ionic liquids employing the methods of surface science"
2016	Maki Kawai	"For elucidation of the role of vibrational dynamics in single-molecule reactions at surfaces"
2015	Charles T. Campbell	“For seminal contributions to determining accurate adsorption energetics and for developing key concepts for the analysis of important catalytic reactions"
2014	Patricia Thiel	“For seminal contributions to the understanding of quasicrystalline surfaces and thin-film nucleation and growth”
2013	Chris G. Van de Walle	"For seminal contributions to the theory of heterojunctions and its applications to semiconductor technology, and for elucidating the role of hydrogen in electronic materials."
2012	Yves Chabal	"For his exceptional studies of vibrations at surfaces, especially the development and application of surface infrared spectroscopy to understand the physics and chemistry of hydrogen-terminated silicon and atomic layer deposition"
2011	Wilson Ho	"For the development and application of atomic scale inelastic electron tunneling with the scanning tunneling microscope."
2010	Mark J. Kushner	"For outstanding contributions to modeling and physical understanding of plasmas, especially those used in thin film etching, deposition and surface modification."
2009	Robert Hamers	"For wide ranging studies of chemistry and photochemistry at semiconductor surfaces and for establishing connections to various emergent technologies."
2008	Miquel Salmeron	"For seminal contributions to the development of surface characterization techniques usable in a variety of environments and their application to catalysis, tribology and related surface phenomena."
2007	Jerry Tersoff	“for seminal theoretical contributions to the understanding of surfaces, interfaces, thin films and nanostructures of electronic materials.”
2006	John C. Hemminger	"For outstanding contributions to the development of quantitative, molecular level understanding of many important interfacial processes, especially those related to atmospheric chemistry."
2005	Charles S. Fadley	"For the development of novel techniques based on photoelectron spectroscopy and synchrotron radiation, and their application to the study of the atomic, electronic, and magnetic structure of surfaces and buried interfaces."
2004	Rudolf M. Tromp	"For fundamental discoveries in epitaxial growth and elucidation of their applications to technological problems."
2003	Matthias Scheffler	"For developing Density Functional Theory methods to describe surface chemical reactions and enabling their widespread use."
2002	Buddy D. Ratner	"For innovative research on biomaterial interfaces and establishing the field of biomaterials surface science."
2001	Ward Plummer	"For the development of novel instrumentation, its use to illuminate new concepts in the surface physics of metals, and the mentoring of promising young scientists."
2000	D. Phillip Woodruff	"For contributions to the understanding of the geometric properties of clean and adsorbate-decorated surfaces, and for innovative development of surface science techniques."
1999	John H. Weaver	"For his seminal contributions to the atomic-level understanding of thin-film growth, interfacial interactions, and etching."
1998	David E. Aspnes	"For novel applications and creative development of optical methods and effects for research on thin films, surfaces and interfaces which have significantly advanced the understanding of electronic materials and processes."
1997	Phaedon Avouris	"For his seminal contributions to the understanding of the chemistry of semiconductor surfaces and for his development of the STM as a tool for probing and inducing surface chemical reactions with atomic scale resolution and control."
1996	Peter Feibelman	"For his insightful predications and explanations of surface phenomena based on first principles calculations.
1995	Gerhard Ertl	"For excellence in the use of modern methods for developing key concepts important to surface chemistry."
1994	John T. Yates, Jr.	"For the development and use of modern measurement methods to provide insights into the behavior of chemisorbed species on metal and semiconductor surfaces."
1993	George Comsa	"For seminal discoveries and investigations in vacuum and surface science, in particular the extensive development of thermal-energy atom scattering for the structural analysis of surfaces."
1992	Ernst G. Bauer	"For his contributions to the fundamental understanding of thin film nucleation and growth and for his invention, development and use of multiple surface characterization techniques to study those thin films."
1991	Max G. Lagally	"For outstanding contributions to the quantitative understanding of defects with respect to ordering and growth of surface structures."
1990	Jerry M. Woodall	"For seminal contributions to compound semiconductor science and technology."
1989	Robert Gomer	"For pioneering contributions to surface science, including definitive studies on the theory and application of field emission, chemisorption, and desorption phenomena."
1988	Peter Sigmund	"For theoretical contributions to the field of physical sputtering and related phenomena."
1987	Mark J. Cardillo	"For his innovative and pioneering research on the interaction of molecular beams with surfaces."
1986	Harald Ibach	"For the development of high resolution electron energy loss spectroscopy and its applications to the characterization of surfaces and absorbates."
1985	Theodore E. Madey	"For his investigations of surface processes at a fundamental atomic and molecular level, especially the determination of absorbed molecule bonding geometries."
1984	William E. Spicer	"For his contributions to the development and application of photoelectron spectroscopy in the study of the electronic structure and chemical properties of solids and their surfaces and interfaces."
1983	H. H. Wieder	"For his contributions to growth of thin semiconductor single crystal films, and most importantly, for research leading toward III-V MOS technology."
1981	Harrison E. Farnsworth	"For his pioneering studies of the preparation, structural characterization, and properties of atomically clean surfaces."
1979	Gert Ehrlich	"For contributions to our understanding of the microscopic force laws by which atoms residing on solid surfaces interact with the substrate and with each other."
1978	Georg H. Hass	"For techniques of preparation and characterization of thin films for optical coatings of importance to solar energy, space technology, and electro-optics."
1977	Charles B. Duke	"For far-reaching theoretical contributions to surface science and solid state physics in the areas of low energy electron diffraction, electron tunneling and the electronic structure of large organic molecules."
1976	Leslie Holland	"In recognition of his many important contributions to vacuum technology and to thin film and surface sciences."
1975	Paul A. Redhead	"In recognition of his distinguished contributions to the science of low pressure measurement and his far-reaching research on the properties and behavior of absorbed species."
1974	Homer D. Hagstrum	"For pioneering contributions to ultrahigh vacuum studies of solid surfaces, especially the incorporation into a single vacuum chamber of multiple experimental measurements oncontrolled, individual surfaces; the development of an experimental technique to measure with high precision the energy distribution of electrons ejected from surfaces by the neutralization of slow ions; and the conversion of this technique into aspectroscopy of the electronic structure of well-characterized solid surfaces by virtue of his elucidation of the nature of the physical mechanism of this neutralization process."
1973	Lawrence A. Harris	"For his pioneering work in the field of Auger electron spectroscopy. Harris was responsible for the key publication recognizing the potential of Auger electron spectroscopy as a surface analytical tool which he developed and demonstrated. His contribution has had far-reaching impact on the field of surface science and related technical activities."
1972 -	Kenneth C.D. Hickman	"For his contributions in the development of condensation pumps and their working fluids and, in particular, for his discovery of the self-fractionating principle which has made these pumps possible."
1971	Gottfried K. Wehner	"For his pioneering work in the field of sputtering, which has profoundly influenced many other scientists and engineers."
1970	Erwin Wilhelm Müller	"For work including the development of field electron and field ion microscopy."

== See also ==
- List of physics awards
