= Wayne B. Nottingham Prize =

Awarded at the Physical Electronics Conference (PEC)

The Wayne B. Nottingham Prize is awarded annually at the Physical Electronics Conference (PEC), a conference that focuses on new research results in the field of surface science and in the sub-fields of physics and chemistry of interfaces. It was established from contributions given in memory of Professor Wayne B. Nottingham of the Massachusetts Institute of Technology (MIT) by many of his friends and associates. The prize currently consists of a certificate and in 1974 was $200 but has increased recently to $1,500, and is awarded to the best student paper presented at the conference. A student paper is defined as a paper based on a Ph.D. thesis whose date of submission to the faculty is no earlier than one year before the meeting at which the Prize is given.

It was first given in March 1966 at MIT and in March thereafter until February 1974 when the PEC was held at Bell Labs in Murray Hill, New Jersey. (Note: according to information from a private communication from Torgny Gustafsson, 1974 co-winner) This adjustment was to avoid overlap in time with the American Physical Society's March meeting which in the 1970s was about 30 times larger than the PEC. Due to the weather in February leading to icy roads and delays in the scheduled events, in 1975 the PEC was moved to June where it still is today.

== Recipients ==
Year	Winner(s)	Location	Thesis advisor(s)
1966	L.F. Cordes	University of Minnesota	W.T. Peria
1967	D. Steiner & J.V. Hollweg	M.I.T & M.I.T	E.P. Gyftopoulous
1968	E. Ward Plummer	Cornell University	T.N. Rhodin
1969	John C. Tracy	Cornell University	J.M. Blakely
1970	J.M. Baker	Cornell University	J.M. Blakely
1971	D.P. Smith	Univ. of Minnesota	W.T. Peria
1972	W. Henry Weinberg	Univ. of California, Berkeley	R. Merrill
1973	J.R. Bower	Bartol Research Foundation	J.M. Chen
1974	N.J. Dionne & Torgny Gustafsson	Cornell University & Chalmers Univ. of Technology	T.N. Rhodin & P.O. Nillson
1975	L.C. Isett	Cornell University	J.M. Blakely
1976	J.A. Knapp	Montana State University	G.A. Lapeyre
1977	S.-L. Weng	Univ. of Pennsylvania	E.W. Plummer
1978	Gwo-Ching Wang	Univ. of Wisconsin, Madison	M.G. Lagally
1979	Wilson Ho	Univ. of Pennsylvania	E.W. Plummer
1980	R. Difoggio & Harry J. Levinson	Univ. of Chicago & Univ. of Pennsylvania	R. Gomer & E.W. Plummer
1981	Ruud M. Tromp	FOM Institut	F.W. Saris
1982	P.O. Hahn	Leibniz University Hannover	M. Henzler
1983	R. Raue	Cologne and KFA Julich	G. Guntherodt & M. Campagna
1984	M. Onellion	Rice University	G.K. Walters
1985	K. Gibson & J.W.M. Frenken	Univ. of Chicago & FOM Institut	S.J. Sibener & J.F. van der Veen
1986	S.M. Yalisove	Univ. of Pennsylvania	W.R. Graham
1987	John D. Beckerle	M.I.T.	S.T. Ceyer
1988	Lee J. Richter	Cornell University	W. Ho
1989	J.-K. Zuo	R.P.I.	G.-C. Wang
1990	Y.-W. Mo	Univ. of Wisconsin, Madison	M.G. Lagally
1991	Brian S. Swartzentruber	Univ. of Wisconsin, Madison	M.B. Webb
1992	Thomas Michely	KFA, Julich	G. Comsa
1993	Anna K. Swan	Boston University	M. El-Batanouny
1994	G. Rosenfeld	KFA, Julich	G. Comsa
1995	Marcus K. Weldon	Harvard University	C. Friend
1996	J. Carpinelli & B. Kohler	Univ. of Tennessee & Fritz Haber Inst.	E.W. Plummer & M. Scheffler
1997	D. Gragson	Univ. of Oregon	G. Richmond
1998	Barry C. Stipe & M.S. Hoogeman	Cornell University & FOM Inst./Leiden Univ.	W. Ho & J.W.M. Frenken
1999	Kalman Pelhos	Rutgers University	T.E. Madey
2000	Lincoln Lauhon	Cornell University	W. Ho
2001	Gayle Thayer	Sandia Livermore & UC Davis	R. Hwang & S. Chiang
2002	Denis Potapenko	Rutgers University	B.J. Hinch
2003	John P. Pierce	Univ. of Tennessee & ORNL	E.W. Plummer & Jian Shen
2004	Peter Wahl	Max Planck Inst. for Solid State Physics	K. Kern
2005	Nathan Guisinger	Northwestern University	Mark C. Hersam
2006	Mustafa Murat Özer & Paul C. Snijders	University of Tennessee and Delft University of Technology	J.R. Thompson and H.H. Weitering & H.H. Weitering
2007	Peter Maksymovych	University of Pittsburgh	J. T. Yates, Jr.
2008	Brett Goldsmith	Univ. of California, Irvine	P.G. Collins
2009	Alpha T. N'Diaye	Univ. of Cologne	T. Michely
2010	Heather L. Tierney	Tufts University	E. Charles H. Sykes
2011	Tanza Lewis	Univ. of California, Irvine	J. Hemminger & B. Winter
2012	Daniel Schwarz	University of Twente	B. Poelsema
2013	Benjamin A. Gray	University of Arkansas	J. Chakhalian
2014	Donna A. Kunkel	University of Nebraska - Lincoln	A. Enders
2015	Christoph Große & Amanda Larson	Max Planck Institute for Solid State Research & University of New Hampshire	K. Kern & K. Pohl
2016	Charlotte Herbig	University of Cologne	T. Michely
2017	Erik S. Skibinski	Cornell University	Melissa A. Hines
2018	Felix Lüpke	FZ Jülich	B. Voigtländer
2019	Xiaolong Liu	Northwestern University	M.C. Hersam
2020	Mounika Vutukuru	Boston University	Anna Swan
2021	Jeremy F. Schultz	University of Illinois Chicago	Nan Jiang
2022	Anuva Aishwarya	University of Illinois, Urbana-Champaign	Vidya Madhavan
2023	Sayantan Mahapatra	University of Illinois Chicago	Nan Jiang
2025	Elizabeth E. Happel & Benjamin X. Shi	Tufts University & University of Cambridge	E. Charles H. Sykes & Angelos Michaelides

== See also ==
- List of chemistry awards
