= Jingguang Chen =

Chinese-American chemical engineer

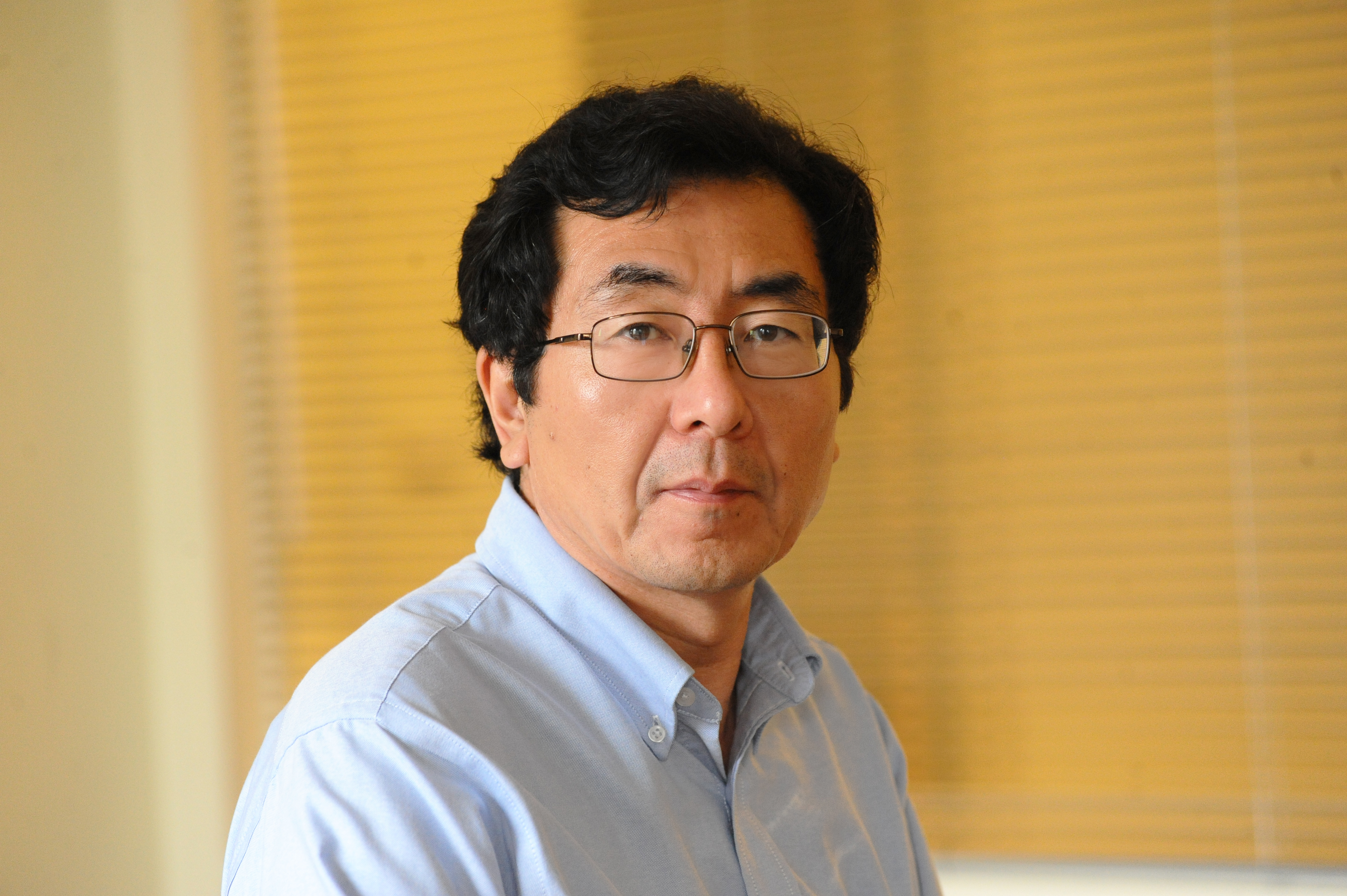
- Education: Nanjing University (B.S. Chemistry), University of Pittsburgh (Ph.D. Chemistry)
- Scientific career
- Fields: Catalysis, synchrotron methods, chemical engineering, surface science
- Workplaces: Columbia University, Brookhaven National Laboratory
- Doctoral advisor: John T. Yates
- Website: blogs.cuit.columbia.edu/chengroup/

Jingguang Chen is a Chinese-American chemical engineer. He has worked in several institutions, including as the Thayer Lindsley Professor of Chemical Engineering at Columbia University, as a Senior Chemist at Brookhaven National Laboratory, and the Claire LeClaire Profssor of Chemical Engineering at the University of Delaware. Over the course of his career, he has made significant contributions to the fundamental understanding and use of novel materials for catalytic and electrocatalytic applications, including research into the development of bimetallic and transition metal carbide catalysts.

== Education ==
After earning his Bachelors of Science in chemistry from Nanjing University in 1982, Chen was selected by the China–USA Chemistry Graduate Program (CGP) for graduate studies in the US.

He received his Ph.D. in chemistry at the University of Pittsburgh in 1988 under the guidance of American surface scientist John Yates. Chen then became an Alexander von Humboldt Postdoctoral Fellow 1988–1989 at Forschungszentrum-Julich, Germany, where his research advisor was Harald Ibach.

== Professional career ==
Upon completion of his postdoctoral position in Germany, Chen went to work for the Exxon Corporate Research Laboratory as a staff scientist (1990–1998) and spokesperson for the Exxon U1A Synchrotron Beamline at Brookhaven National Laboratory (1994–1998).

In 1998 he began his academic career at the University of Delaware. While at Delaware, in 2008 he was named the Claire D. LeClaire Professor of Chemical Engineering and served several leadership roles including director of the Center for Catalytic Science and Technology (CCST) and interim director of the University of Delaware Energy Institute (UDEI).

In 2012, Chen moved to Columbia University, where he became the Thayer Lindsley Professor of Chemical Engineering. He has also held a joint appointment at the chemistry department of Brookhaven National Lab since 2012.

Chen has also been the co-founder and director of the Synchrotron Catalysis Consortium since 2005, chair of the Catalysis Division of the American Chemical Society 2014–2015, president of the North American Catalysis Society since 2017, and associate editor of ACS Catalysis since 2016.

== Research ==
Chen has made many contributions to the understanding and development of novel catalytic and electrocatalytic materials, including bimetallic catalysts, transition metal carbides, and metal-modified carbide catalysts. Chen and his research group have made many discoveries relating to monolayer (ML) bimetallic catalysts, which are tunable materials where a single atomic layer (i.e. monolayer) of one metal is deposited on the surface or subsurface of a second material. Chen has developed these and other catalytic materials for a wide range of applications, including in developing tunable, low-cost (electro)catalysts for the production and use of clean fuels such as hydrogen (made from water electrolysis), nitrogen-based fuels, and methanol or CO (made from CO_{2}).

Some of Chen's research efforts involve a combination of theory and ultra-high vacuum (UHV) surface science tools to gain fundamental understanding of the chemical, physical, and electronic structures of the catalytic materials he studies. Chen's research also commonly relies on X-ray synchrotron techniques, such as X-ray Absorption Spectroscopy (XAS) to better understand the atomic structure of catalytic and electrocatalytic materials under reaction conditions. As of 2025, Chen has been an inventor or co-inventor of over 20 United States patents and published over 500 peer-reviewed papers (h-index=124).

== Awards ==
- Russell and Siguard Varian Fellow (American Vacuum Society), 1986
- Alexander von Humboldt Postdoctoral Fellow, 1988
- Catalysis Award of Philadelphia Catalysis Club, 2004
- Fellow, American Vacuum Society, 2008
- Excellence in Catalysis Award, New York Catalysis Society, 2008
- Herman Pines Award in Catalysis, Chicago Catalysis Club, 2011
- Fellow, American Chemical Society, 2013
- Giuseppe Parravano Memorial Award in Catalysis, Michigan Catalysis Society, 2015
- George Olah Award in Hydrocarbon Chemistry, American Chemical Society, 2015
- Robert Burwell Lectureship in Catalysis, North American Catalysis Society, 2017
- R.B. Anderson Award, Canadian Catalysis Division, 2020
- Robert H. Wilhelm Award in Chemical Reaction Engineering, American Institute of Chemical Engineers (AIChE), 2020
- Fellow, American Institute of Chemical Engineers, 2021
- Fellow, Royal Society of Chemistry, 2023
- Elected Member, National Academy of Engineering, 2024
