= Theodore E. Madey =

American surface scientist

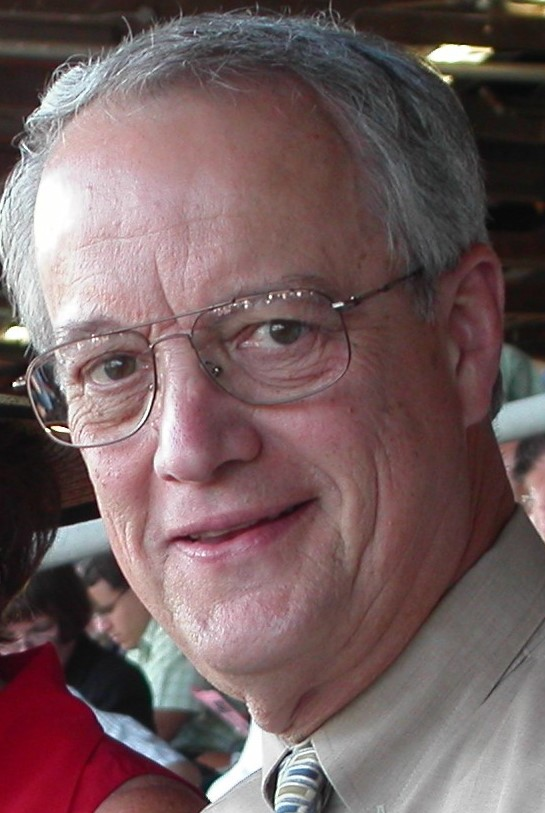
- Madey in 2002
- Born: October 24, 1937; Wilmington, Delaware, USA
- Died: July 27, 2008 (aged 70); Somerset, New Jersey
- Education: Loyola College; University of Notre Dame
- Known for: Foundational work in surface science, at the interface of physics and chemistry
- Awards: 1985 Medard W. Welch Award; 2003 NIST Gallery of Distinguished Scientists
- Scientific career
- Fields: Condensed matter physics, Surface Science, Chemistry
- Workplaces: National Bureau of Standards, Rutgers University
- Doctoral advisor: Edward Arthur Coomes
- Other academic advisors: Alexander A. Petrauskas
- Website: lsm.rutgers.edu/updated/indexm.html

Theodore E. Madey (October 24, 1937 – July 27, 2008) was an American condensed matter physicist who specialized in the chemistry and physics of surfaces. He was a professor in the physics and chemistry departments at Rutgers University at the time of his death.

== Early life and education ==
Theodore Eugene Madey was born in Wilmington, DE, and was raised in Baltimore, MD. He was the descendant of Polish American immigrants who were amongst a wave of immigrants that fled instability and famine in Poland at the turn of the century. His grandparents and parents lived in Delaware's New Castle County at the time of his birth, where his Polish-born grandfather worked for a shipbuilding company. At a young age, his family relocated to Baltimore, MD where he was raised, and attended Loyola Blakefield High School. He majored in physics at Loyola College, also in Baltimore, and completed a B.S. in 1959. In the summer following his graduation he was hired by one his college professors, a graduate of the University of Notre Dame, to work in a physics laboratory with vacuum materials. Madey went on to attend graduate school in physics at the University of Notre Dame and continued to work in the field of vacuum science. He completed his Ph.D. in physics in the experimental condensed matter group of Edward Coomes in 1963.

== Career ==
Madey's first appointment after graduation was at the National Bureau of Standards (NBS), as a National Research Council post-doctoral fellow. He was hired permanently, and remained there for 25 years, becoming the leader of the Surface Science and Kinetics group. While employed at NBS, he developed a close working relationship with John T. Yates, Jr., with whom he would go on to co-author more than 60 publications, and was jointly awarded the 1978 Samuel Wesley Stratton Award. In 1988, he relocated to New Jersey, where he was appointed as the State of New Jersey Professor of Surface Science at Rutgers University, and mentored dozens of students and post-doctoral research associates. He remained in this position until his death in 2008. While at Rutgers, he hosted one of his former post-doctoral research associates, Ulrike Diebold, and her research group into his own research laboratory when Diebold's group was forced to temporarily evacuate in 2005 from Tulane University in New Orleans because of Hurricane Katrina.

Madey served on a number of scientific editorial boards, and also held a variety of elected and appointed leadership roles in the AVS., including President (2001). He was also extensively involved with international outreach and served as the President (1992-1995), and Secretary-General (1986-1989) of the International Union for Vacuum Science, Technique and Applications (IUVSTA).

== Research ==
Madey's research activities fell into three areas:

- "Surface structure, electronic properties, and reactivity of bimetallic surfaces by atomic-resolution scanning tunneling microscopy, electron diffraction, and synchrotron radiation.
- Mechanisms of electron - and photon-stimulated desorption of atoms and ions from surfaces (including charge transfer and energy transfer phenomena) using unique apparatus that permits angle-resolved ion detection.
- Nucleation, growth, epitaxial structure and interfacial reactivity of ultrathin metal films on oxide surfaces and on polymer surfaces using electron and ion spectroscopies, coupled with high resolution (sub-nanometer) electron microscopy."

His technique using desorption of atoms induced by electronic transitions to study surfaces was known as (DIET). It involved striking a surface with photons or electrons so as to cause an adsorbate to transition into a repulsive excited state, which if long-lived enough would cause it to be ejected from the surface carrying a significant amount of energy. In the case of a dielectric sample such as a halide or oxide, the phenomenon is capable of causing the ejection of surface atoms, leading to electron- or photon beam damage in surface analytical methods such as Auger Electron Spectroscopy or Photoelectron Spectroscopy. It also provided an explanation for why the atmosphere of the Moon and of Mercury have atmospheres enriched in sodium and potassium because of their exposure to solar wind. In collaboration with John T. Yates, Jr., Madey studied abrasion of monumental brass in historical structures. Their work is credited with playing a significant role in allowing the rubbing of brass to continue as a cleaning method, by revealing a rubbing method for brass that cleaned without abrading or destroying it. Madey also co-authored, along with Patricia Thiel, a highly cited and comprehensive review article describing the interactions and properties of water near solid surfaces.

A special issue of the Journal of Physics: Condensed Matter was published in 2010 to honor his memory.

== Honors and awards ==
Madey received numerous awards and honors for the quality and creativity of his work, including an honorary Doctorate Honoris Causa from the University of Wroclaw in Poland in 2004, in recognition of a decade-long collaboration with colleagues in Poland. Other honors include:

- 1971 Fellow of the American Physical Society
- 1978 Samuel Wesley Stratton Award, jointly with John T. Yates, "for an unusually significant research contribution to science or engineering that merits the acclaim of the scientific world and supports NIST's mission objectives"
- 1993 Fellow of the American Vacuum Society
- 1985 Medard W. Welch Award,"For his investigations of surface processes at a fundamental atomic and molecular level, especially the determination of absorbed molecule bonding geometries."
- 2003 Inducted into the NIST Gallery of Distinguished Scientists

Two years after Madey's death in 2008, the Theodore E. Madey Award was established by AVS to commemorate both his research and his leadership in international interactions of the AVS. The Award recipient is sponsored to visit Poland, present a seminar at the University, and engage in scientific discussions.

== Personal life ==
Madey was born on October 24, 1937, in Wilmington, Delaware. He met his wife, Jane Mary Madey (Gunn), while he was in college by gaining access to a cast party following her performance at a nearby college. They were married for 48 years, until his death on July 27, 2008, in Somerset, New Jersey. They had four children, Timothy Madey, Doretta Witt, Maureen O'Shea, and Daniel Madey, the first of whom was born while Madey was in graduate school at the University of Notre Dame.
