= Davisson–Germer Prize =

The Davisson–Germer Prize in Atomic or Surface Physics is an annual prize that has been awarded by the American Physical Society since 1965. The recipient is chosen for "outstanding work in atomic physics or surface physics". The prize is named after Clinton Davisson and Lester Germer, who first measured electron diffraction, and as of 2007 it is valued at $5,000.

== Recipients ==
* 2027: M. Zahid Hasan
- 2026: Herman Batelaan
- 2025: Gwo-Ching Wang
- 2024: Anne L'Huillier
- 2023: Feng Liu
- 2022: David S. Weiss
- 2021: Michael F. Crommie
- 2020: Klaas Bergmann
- 2019: Randall M. Feenstra
- 2018: John E. Thomas
- 2017: Eli Rotenberg and Stephen Kevan
- 2016: Randall G. Hulet
- 2015: Miquel B. Salmeron and Tai-Chang Chiang
- 2014: Nora Berrah
- 2013: Geraldine L. Richmond
- 2012: Jean Dalibard
- 2011: Joachim Stohr
- 2010: Chris H. Greene
- 2009: Yves Chabal and Krishnan Raghavachari
- 2008: Horst Schmidt-Böcking
- 2007: Franz Himpsel
- 2006: C. Lewis Cocke
- 2005: Ernst G. Bauer
- 2004: Paul Julienne
- 2003: Rudolf M. Tromp
- 2002: Gerald Gabrielse
- 2001: Donald M. Eigler
- 2000: William Happer
- 1999: Steven Gwon Sheng Louie
- 1998: Sheldon Datz
- 1997: Jerry D. Tersoff
- 1996: Thomas Francis Gallagher
- 1995: Max G. Lagally
- 1994: Carl Weiman [sic]
- 1993: Joseph Demuth
- 1992: Larry Spruch
- 1991: Neville V. Smith
- 1990: David Wineland
- 1989: Peter J. Feibelman
- 1988: John L. Hall
- 1987: Maurice B. Webb
- 1986: Daniel Kleppner
- 1985: J. Gregory Dash
- 1984: Manfred A. Biondi and Gordon H. Dunn
- 1983: E. W. Plummer
- 1982: Llewellyn H. Thomas
- 1981: Robert Gomer
- 1980: Alexander Dalgarno
- 1979: Joel Appelbaum and Donald R. Hamann
- 1978: Vernon Hughes
- 1977: Walter Kohn and Norton Lang
- 1976: Ugo Fano
- 1975: James J. Lander and Homer D. Hagstrum
- 1974: Norman Ramsey
- 1972: Erwin Wilhelm Müller
- 1970: Hans Dehmelt
- 1967: Horace Richard Crane
- 1965: George J. Schulz

== See also ==
- List of physics awards
