= David Adler Lectureship Award =

The David Adler Lectureship Award in the Field of Materials Physics is a prize that has been awarded annually by the American Physical Society since 1988. The recipient is chosen for "an outstanding contributor to the field of materials physics, who is noted for the quality of his/her research, review articles and lecturing." The prize is named after physicist David Adler with contributions to the endowment by friends of David Adler and major support from Energy Conversion Devices, Inc., as well as support from the American Physical Society's Division of Materials Physics. The prize includes a $5,000 honorarium.

== Recipients ==
Source: American Physical Society

- 2026 Nicola Marzari
- 2025 Sergei V. Kalinin
- 2024 Nitin Samarth
- 2023 Elbio Dagotto
- 2022 Axel Hoffmann
- 2021 Robert Cava
- 2020 Chang-Beom Eom
- 2019 Giulia Galli
- 2018 Christopher J. Palmstrǿm
- 2017 Heike E. Riel
- 2016 Harry A. Atwater
- 2015 Jacqueline Krim
- 2014 Paul C. Canfield
- 2013 Jean-Luc Bredas
- 2012 Stuart Parkin
- 2011 Stephen Pearton
- 2010 Patricia Thiel
- 2009 Salvatore Torquato
- 2008 Karin Rabe
- 2007 Samuel D. Bader
- 2006 James R. Chelikowsky
- 2005 Ramamoorthy Ramesh
- 2004 Chia-Ling Chien
- 2003 Ivan K. Schuller
- 2002 Chris G. Van de Walle
- 2001 Ellen D. Williams (scientist)
- 2000 Bertram Batlogg
- 1999 Leonard C. Feldman
- 1998 Joe Greene
- 1997 John D. Joannopoulos
- 1996 M. Brian Maple
- 1995 Marc A. Kastner
- 1994 Max Lagally
- 1993 Simon C. Moss
- 1992 Robert A. Street
- 1991 John R. Smith
- 1990 Michael Schluter
- 1989 Robert W. Balluffi
- 1988 Jan Tauc

== See also ==
- Leo Szilard Lectureship Award
- List of physics awards
