= Stephen Pearton =

Australian and American materials scientist (1957–2025)

Stephen John Pearton (January 15, 1957 – December 7, 2025) was an Australian and American materials scientist, engineer and a Distinguished Professor at the University of Florida. Pearton's work focused on the use of advanced materials in areas such as laser diodes, nanomaterial applications, and similar applications.

== Life and career ==
Pearton was born in Hobart, Tasmania, on January 15, 1957. He was a recipient of the J.J. Ebers Award from the Institute of Electrical and Electronics Engineers, and the David Adler Lectureship Award in the Field of Materials Physics from the American Physical Society. He was also a Fellow of multiple professional or academic societies, including the Institute of Electrical and Electronics Engineers, the American Physical Society, the Materials Research Society, and the American Vacuum Society.

Pearton died on December 7, 2025, at the age of 68.
