= John H. Weaver =

American physicist

John H. Weaver is an American physicist.

Weaver obtained a bachelor's degree in physics from the University of Missouri in 1967 and completed a PhD at Iowa State University in 1972, while conducting research at Ames Laboratory. He joined the University of Wisconsin–Madison's Synchrotron Radiation Center, then moved to the University of Minnesota in 1982. Between 1994 and 1995, Weaver was the Admundson Professor at UM and won the Alexander von Humboldt Senior Distinguished U.S. Scientist Award. After receiving the award, Weaver spent time at the Fritz-Haber-Institut and as university professor at Tohoku University. In 1995, Weaver taught at the University of Hong Kong while holding the Royal Society Kan Tong Po Professorship. In 2000, Weaver began teaching at the University of Illinois at Urbana–Champaign, became Donald B. Willett Professor in 2003, and received emeritus status upon retirement in 2014.

Weaver in a 1991 fellow of the American Physical Society, and was elected to an equivalent honor by the American Association for the Advancement of Science in 2004. in 1995, Weaver served as president of the American Vacuum Society. He received the Medard W. Welch Award from the AVS in 1999.

After retiring from physics research, Weaver began creating live edge wood art.
