= Mark Cardillo =

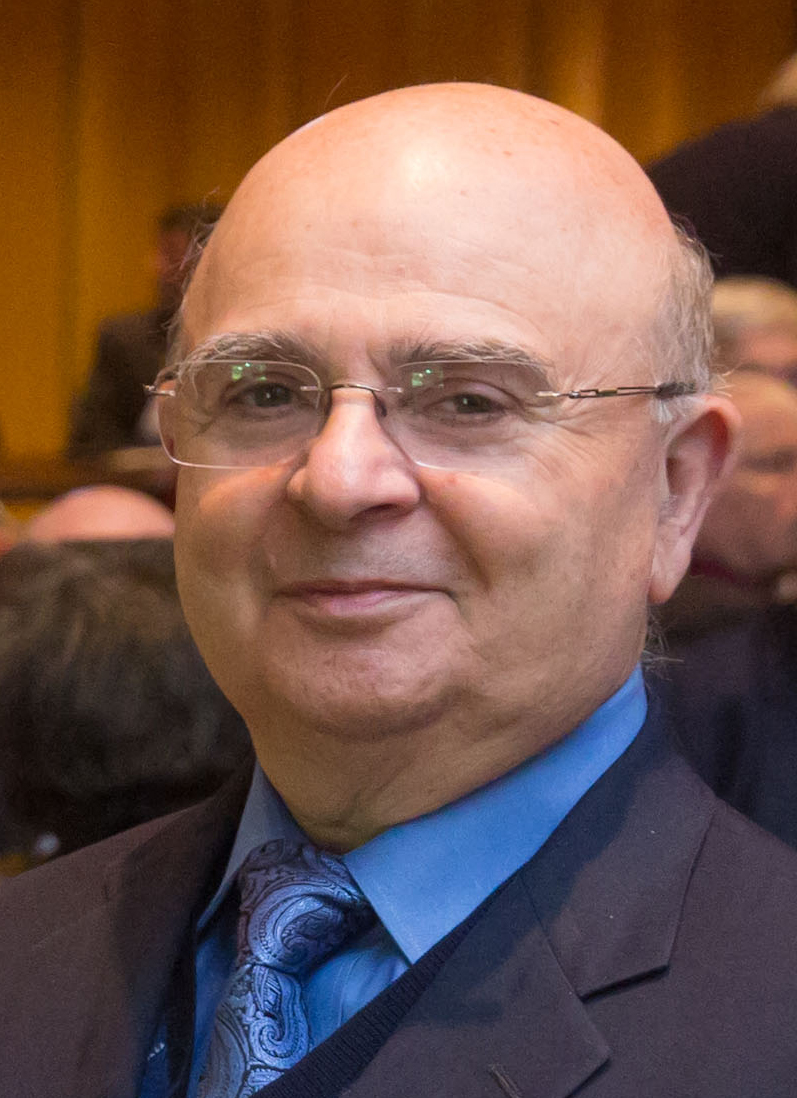
Mark J. Cardillo, 2017

Mark J. Cardillo is an American chemist currently at The Camille and Henry Dreyfus Foundation and an Elected Fellow of the American Association for the Advancement of Science.

He received a B.S. degree from Stevens Institute of Technology, Hoboken, New Jersey, in 1964 and a Ph.D. in chemistry from Cornell University. He then worked as a research associate at Brown University, a postdoctoral fellow at the University of Genoa, Italy and a research fellow in the mechanical engineering department at MIT.

From there he accepted a position in 1975 at (AT & T) Bell Laboratories in Murray Hill, New Jersey, where he was appointed head of the chemical physics research department in 1981 and subsequently head of the photonics materials research department and director of broad band access research. He left ATT to become executive director, Dreyfus Foundation in 2005.

He was elected a Fellow of the American Physical Society in 1987 "for pioneering applications of molecular beam techniques to the study of elastic, inelastic, and reactive gas-surface interactions". In the same year he was awarded the Medard W. Welch Award by the American Vacuum Society.
