= Chris G. Van de Walle =

American materials physicist at UC Santa Barbara

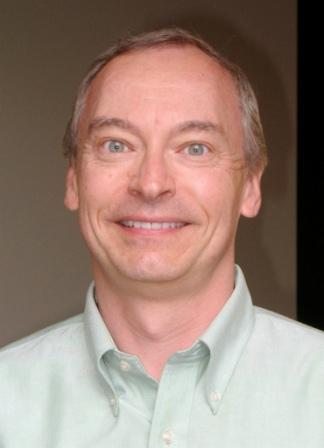
- Citizenship: US, Belgian
- Known for: First-principles calculations for materials Model solid approximation
- Awards: Aneesur Rahman Prize (2025); Medard W. Welch Award (2013); David Adler Lectureship Award (2002); Humboldt Research Award (1998)
- Scientific career
- Fields: Condensed matter physics Materials science
- Institutions: University of California, Santa Barbara,
- Doctoral advisor: Richard Martin

Chris G. Van de Walle is a professor in the Materials Department at the University of California, Santa Barbara. He received a Ph.D. in Electrical Engineering from Stanford University in 1986. Prior to joining UCSB in 2004, he was a principal scientist at the Xerox Palo Alto Research Center (PARC). His research interests include first-principles calculations for materials, defects and doping in semiconductors and oxides, surfaces and interfaces, and the physics of hydrogen in materials. Van de Walle is a Fellow of the APS, MRS, AAAS, AVS, and IEEE. He is the recipient of a Humboldt Research Award for Senior US Scientist, the Medard W. Welch Award, and the David Adler Lectureship Award in the Field of Materials Physics from the APS.
