= Joel Appelbaum =

American physicist

Joel Alan Appelbaum (born December 30, 1941) is an American physicist.

Appelbaum was born in New York City on December 30, 1941, and successively earned a Bachelor of Science degree from the City University of New York in 1963 followed by a Master of Science and PhD in physics at the University of Chicago in 1964 and 1966, respectively. He joined Bell Laboratories in 1967, taught for one academic year at the University of California, Berkeley, then returned to Bell, where he remained until 1994. While affiliated with Bell Labs, Appelbaum was elected a fellow of the American Physical Society in 1978 and shared the APS Davisson-Germer Prize in Atomic or Surface Physics with Donald R. Hamann the following year. Between 1994 and 2000, Appelbaum worked for the Micropolis Corporation. He has also worked for Univel.
