= Jay Gregory Dash =

J. Gregory Dash
- Born: June 28, 1923; New York City
- Died: November 28, 2010 (aged 87)
- Education: City College of New York; Columbia University
- Awards: Davisson-Germer Prize (1985)
- Scientific career
- Fields: Physics, applied physics
- Workplaces: University of Washington
- Doctoral advisor: Henry Boorse
- Doctoral students: David L. Goodstein, Jacqueline Krim, Robert Ecke

J. Gregory Dash (1923–2010) was a physics professor, known for his research on superfluidity, adsorption of gases on smooth surfaces, surface melting, and films on solid surfaces.

== Biography ==
Dash graduated with B.S. from City College of New York (CUNY) in 1944. During WW II he trained as a radar technician in the Pacific Fleet. He graduated from Columbia University with A.M in 1949 and Ph.D. in 1951. From 1951 to 1960 he was a staff member of Los Alamos National Laboratory. He was a Guggenheim Fellow for the academic year 1957–1958, which he spent at the University of Cambridge. In the physics department of University of Washington, Dash was an acting associate professor from 1960 to 1961, an associate professor from 1962 to 1963, and a full professor from 1963 to 2003, when he retired as professor emeritus. From 1961 to 1964 he was a consultant for the Boeing Company. He was a visiting professor at the Technion for the academic year 1974–1975 and an exchange professor at Aix-Marseille Université for the academic year 1977–1978. At the Advanced Study Institute, North Atlantic Treaty Organization (NATO), he was a director in 1985 and again in 1997. After retiring as professor emeritus in 2003, he, along with Ernest Mark Henley (1924–2017), continued to teach until 2009 at the University of Washington Transition School for gifted high school students.

At Los Alamos, Dash participated in pioneering measurements of the heat of mixing liquid ^{3}He with liquid ^{4}He.

It is fair to say that his experiments on the growth of films sparked a revival of interest in both the theory of "wetting" and its experimental realizations. Of particular interest to Greg was the phenomenon of surface melting, the wetting of the solid-vapor interface by its own liquid phase as the triple point is approached. This again sparked great theoretical interest, this time in the way in which the surface properties of crystals, such as their facets, are lost as the temperature of the solid is increased.

In June 1945 Dash married Joan Geiger. Upon his death, he was survived by his widow, three children, and two grandchildren.

== Selected publications ==
=== Articles ===
- Sommers, Henry S.; Dash, J. Gregory; Goldstein, Louis (1955). "Transmission of Slow Neutrons by Liquid Helium". Physical Review. 97 (4): 855–862. Bibcode:1955PhRv...97..855S. doi:10.1103/PhysRev.97.855.
- Dash, J. G. (1954). "Superfluid Dynamics of Liquid He II". Physical Review. 94 (5): 1091–1096. Bibcode:1954PhRv...94.1091D. doi:10.1103/PhysRev.94.1091.
- Dash, J. G.; Taylor, R. Dean (1957). "Hydrodynamics of Oscillating Disks in Viscous Fluids: Density and Viscosity of Normal Fluid in PureHe4from 1.2K to the Lambda Point". Physical Review. 105 (1): 7–24. Bibcode:1957PhRv..105....7D. doi:10.1103/PhysRev.105.7.
- Housley, R.M.; Erickson, N.E.; Dash, J.G. (1964). "Measurement of recoil-free fractions in studies of the Mössbauer effect". Nuclear Instruments and Methods. 27 (1): 29–37. Bibcode:1964NucIM..27...29H. doi:10.1016/0029-554X(64)90132-6.
- Campbell, C. E.; Dash, J. G.; Schick, M. (1971). "Effects of Lateral Substrate Fields on Helium Monolayers". Physical Review Letters. 26 (16): 966–968. Bibcode:1971PhRvL..26..966C. doi:10.1103/PhysRevLett.26.966.
- Chung, T.T.; Dash, J.G. (1977). "N_{2} Monolayers on graphite: Specific heat and vapor pressure measurements — thermodynamics of size effects and steric factors". Surface Science. 66 (2): 559–580. Bibcode:1977SurSc..66..559C. doi:10.1016/0039-6028(77)90038-3.
- Wilen, L. A.; Dash, J. G. (1995). "Frost Heave Dynamics at a Single Crystal Interface". Physical Review Letters. 74 (25): 5076–5079. Bibcode:1995PhRvL..74.5076W. doi:10.1103/PhysRevLett.74.5076. PMID 10058677. 1975
- Huff, G. B.; Dash, J. G. (1976). "Phases of neon monolayers adsorbed on basal plane graphite". Journal of Low Temperature Physics. 24 (1–2): 155–174. Bibcode:1976JLTP...24..155H. doi:10.1007/BF00659203. S2CID 98793278.
- Dash, J.G. (1978). "Helium films from two to three dimensions". Physics Reports. 38 (4): 177–226. Bibcode:1978PhR....38..177D. doi:10.1016/0370-1573(78)90143-6.
- Dash, J. G. (1989). "Surface melting". Contemporary Physics. 30 (2): 89–100. Bibcode:1989ConPh..30...89D. doi:10.1080/00107518908225509.
- Dash, J. G. (1989). "Thermomolecular Pressure in Surface Melting: Motivation for Frost Heave". Science. 246 (4937): 1591–1593. Bibcode:1989Sci...246.1591D. doi:10.1126/science.246.4937.1591. PMID 17834424. S2CID 36826576.
- Maruyama, M.; Bienfait, M.; Dash, J.G.; Coddens, G. (1992). "Interfacial melting of ice in graphite and talc powders". Journal of Crystal Growth. 118 (1–2): 33–40. Bibcode:1992JCrGr.118...33M. doi:10.1016/0022-0248(92)90046-L.
- Wilen, L. A.; Dash, J. G. (1995). "Frost Heave Dynamics at a Single Crystal Interface". Physical Review Letters. 74 (25): 5076–5079. Bibcode:1995PhRvL..74.5076W. doi:10.1103/PhysRevLett.74.5076. PMID 10058677.
- Dash, J. G.; Fu, Haiying; Wettlaufer, J. S. (1995). "The premelting of ice and its environmental consequences". Reports on Progress in Physics. 58 (1): 115–167. Bibcode:1995RPPh...58..115D. doi:10.1088/0034-4885/58/1/003. S2CID 250842157.
- Dash, J. G. (1999). "History of the search for continuous melting". Reviews of Modern Physics. 71 (5): 1737–1743. Bibcode:1999RvMP...71.1737D. doi:10.1103/RevModPhys.71.1737.
- Mason, B. L.; Dash, J. G. (2000). "Charge and mass transfer in ice-ice collisions: Experimental observations of a mechanism in thunderstorm electrification". Journal of Geophysical Research: Atmospheres. 105 (D8): 10185–10192. Bibcode:2000JGR...10510185M. doi:10.1029/2000JD900104.
- Dash, J. G.; Wettlaufer, J. S. (2003). "The surface physics of ice in thunderstorms". Canadian Journal of Physics. 81 (1–2): 201–207. Bibcode:2003CaJPh..81..201D. doi:10.1139/p03-011.
- Dash, J. G.; Rempel, A. W.; Wettlaufer, J. S. (2006). "The physics of premelted ice and its geophysical consequences". Reviews of Modern Physics. 78 (3): 695–741. Bibcode:2006RvMP...78..695D. CiteSeerX 10.1.1.462.1061. doi:10.1103/RevModPhys.78.695.

=== Books ===
- Dash, J. G. (2 December 2012). Films on Solid Surfaces: The Physics and Chemistry of Physical Adsorption. Elsevier Science. ISBN 978-0-323-15761-2. (pbk reprint of 1975 original edition)
- Wettlaufer, John S.; Dash, J. Gregory; Untersteiner, Norbert, eds. (2013-06-29). Ice Physics and the Natural Environment. Springer. ISBN 9783642600302. (originally published in 1980)
- Dash, J. G.; Ruvalds, J., eds. (2012-12-06). Phase Transitions in Surface Films. Springer. ISBN 9781461330578. (originally published in 1998)
