= Ward Plummer =

American physicist (1940–2020)

E. Ward Plummer
- Born: October 30, 1940; Astoria, Oregon, US
- Died: July 23, 2020 (aged 79); Baton Rouge, Louisiana, US
- Education: Lewis & Clark College (B.A.); Cornell University (Ph.D.)
- Known for: Photoemission
- Awards: Wayne B. Nottingham Prize, Davisson-Germer Prize in Atomic or Surface Physics, Medard W. Welch Award
- Scientific career
- Fields: Surface physics
- Workplaces: University of Pennsylvania; Louisiana State University; University of Tennessee
- Thesis: Binding of the 5d-transition elements on single crystal tungsten surfaces. (1968)
- Doctoral advisor: Thor Rhodin

Earl Ward Plummer (October 30, 1940 – July 23, 2020) was an American physicist. His main contributions were in surface physics of metals. Plummer was a professor of physics at Louisiana State University, University of Pennsylvania and the University of Tennessee - Knoxville.

== Biography ==
Plummer received a Bachelor of Arts degree from Lewis & Clark College in 1962 and completed his Ph.D. degree in physics at Cornell University in 1967, working with Prof. Thor Rhodin. His thesis work was on atomic binding of 5-d transition-metal atoms using Field ion microscope (FIM).

Plummer accepted a National Research Council Postdoctoral Fellowship at the National Bureau of Standards (now called The National Institute of Standards and Technology (NIST)) in the fall of 1967 working with Russ Young, and he stayed as a staff scientist until the fall of 1973. His work included field electron emission and photoemission studies of surfaces. NIST selected his 1969 paper "Resonance Tunneling of Field-Emitted Electrons Through Adsorbates on Metal Surfaces", co-authored with J. W. Gadzuk and R. D. Young, for inclusion in the agency's centennial collection of its top 100 articles of the 20th century. This paper reported the first-ever single electron spectroscopy work in which electronic energy levels of atoms at the surface of a metal were observed.

In 1973, Plummer accepted a position in the Physics Department at the University of Pennsylvania where his work mainly focused on angle-resolved photoemission, momentum-resolved inelastic electron scattering and nonlinear optical response from surfaces. In 1988, he was appointed the William Smith Professor of Physics and in 1990 became the director of the NSF-funded Materials Research Laboratory (Laboratory for Research on Structure of Matter).

In January 1993, Plummer moved to a joint position at The University of Tennessee, Knoxville, and Oak Ridge National Laboratory. His research interests shifted to the study on an atomic scale of phase transitions in reduced dimensionality and surfaces of highly correlated electron systems such as transition-metal oxides. His primary research tool was variable-temperature scanning tunneling microscopy. In 2000, Plummer became the director of the Tennessee Advanced Materials Laboratory, a state-funded Center of Excellence.

Plummer served on many national and international committees both to review existing scientific programs and to identify future directions for science and technology. Recent examples include: Chair of DOE-sponsored Workshop on "Soft X-Ray Science in the Next Millennium: The Future of Photon-In/Photon-Out Experiments, Pikeville, Tennessee, March 15–18, 2000, and Chair of DOE-BESAC (Basic Energy Sciences Advisory Committee) subpanel for the evaluation of the Intense Pulsed Neutron Source (IPNS) at Argonne National Laboratory and the Los Alamos Neutron Science Center (LANSCE) Manuel Lujan Jr. Neutron Scattering Center. He also was a member of the DOE-Basic Energy Sciences Advisory Committee, 2001–2004.

He was the author of more than 400 refereed papers and included in the list of the 1,000 Most Cited Physicists, a list compiled by the Institute for Scientific Information which is based on papers published between 1981 and 1997. But what Plummer was proudest of in his long and distinguished career was the mentoring of promising young scientists. This included advising or co-advising Ph.D. theses of 40 graduate students, hosting ~25 postdoctoral fellows, and assisting many young scientists in advancing their careers. He died in Baton Rouge on July 23, 2020.

== Awards and honors ==
- 1968 Wayne B. Nottingham Prize
- 1983 Davisson-Germer Prize in Atomic or Surface Physics from the American Physical Society for "---the innovative application of electron spectroscopies."
- 1986 Guggenheim Fellowship
- 2001 Medard W. Welch Award by the American Vacuum Society. The citation reads, "For the development of novel instrumentation, its use to illuminate new concepts in the surface physics of metals, and the mentoring of promising young scientists."
- 2006 Elected to National Academy of Sciences
- 2014 Elected to American Academy of Arts and Sciences
- 2017 International Science and Technology Cooperation Award of the People's Republic of China
- 2017 LSU Boyd Professor

== Academic genealogy ==
Ward Plummer was a student of Thor Rhodin...

- Thor Rhodin was a student of Hugh Scott Taylor.
  - Taylor was a student of Frederick George Donnan and Henry Bassett [Ref.1].
    - Donnan was trained by Friedrich Wilhelm Ostwald.
      - Ostwald's adviser was Carl Schmidt.
        - who was a student of Justus von Liebig.
    - Bassett was trained by Adolf von Baeyer and Victor Villiger.
      - Baeyer was a student of Robert Bunsen and Friedrich August Kekulé.
        - Bunsen was a student of Friedrich Stromeyer.
        - Kekulé was a student of Heinrich Will.

== Selected publications ==
- Plummer, E. W.; Eberhardt, W. (14 March 2007). "Angle-Resolved Photoemission as a Tool for the Study of Surfaces". Advances in Chemical Physics. Hoboken, NJ, USA: John Wiley & Sons, Inc. pp. 533–656. doi:10.1002/9780470142691.ch8. ISBN 9780470142691. ISSN 1934-4791.
- Gadzuk, J. W.; Plummer, E. W. (1 July 1973). "Field Emission Energy Distribution (FEED)". Reviews of Modern Physics. 45 (3). American Physical Society (APS): 487–548. Bibcode:1973RvMP...45..487G. doi:10.1103/revmodphys.45.487. ISSN 0034-6861.
- Eberhardt, W.; Plummer, E. W. (15 April 1980). "Angle-resolved photoemission determination of the band structure and multielectron excitations in Ni". Physical Review B. 21 (8). American Physical Society (APS): 3245–3255. Bibcode:1980PhRvB..21.3245E. doi:10.1103/physrevb.21.3245. ISSN 0163-1829.
- Allyn, C. L., Gustafsson, T., Plummer E. W., Orientation of Co adsorbed on Ni(100), Chemical Physics Letters, 47 (1): 127-132, 1977
- Plummer, E. W.; Gustafsson, T.; Gudat, W.; Eastman, D. E. (1 June 1977). "Partial photoionization cross sections ofN2and CO using synchrotron radiation". Physical Review A. 15 (6). American Physical Society (APS): 2339–2355. Bibcode:1977PhRvA..15.2339P. doi:10.1103/physreva.15.2339. ISSN 0556-2791.
- Eberhardt, W.; Greuter, F.; Plummer, E. W. (20 April 1981). "Bonding of H to Ni, Pd, and Pt Surfaces". Physical Review Letters. 46 (16). American Physical Society (APS): 1085–1088. Bibcode:1981PhRvL..46.1085E. doi:10.1103/physrevlett.46.1085. ISSN 0031-9007.
- Plummer, E. W.; Salaneck, W. R.; Miller, J. S. (15 August 1978). "Photoelectron spectra of transition-metal carbonyl complexes: comparison with the spectra of adsorbed CO". Physical Review B. 18 (4). American Physical Society (APS): 1673–1701. Bibcode:1978PhRvB..18.1673P. doi:10.1103/physrevb.18.1673. ISSN 0163-1829.
- Chen, C. T.; Tjeng, L. H.; Rudolf, P.; Meigs, G.; Rowe, J. E.; Chen, J.; McCauley, J. P.; Smith, A. B.; McGhie, A. R.; Romanow, W. J.; Plummer, E. W. (1991). "Electronic states and phases of KxC60 from photoemission and X-ray absorption spectroscopy" (PDF). Nature. 352 (6336). Springer Science and Business Media LLC: 603–605. Bibcode:1991Natur.352..603C. doi:10.1038/352603a0. ISSN 0028-0836. S2CID 4316368.
- Carpinelli, Joseph M.; Weitering, Hanno H.; Plummer, E. Ward; Stumpf, Roland (1996). "Direct observation of a surface charge density wave". Nature. 381 (6581). Springer Science and Business Media LLC: 398–400. Bibcode:1996Natur.381..398C. doi:10.1038/381398a0. ISSN 0028-0836. S2CID 4324202.
- Ho, W.; Willis, R. F.; Plummer, E. W. (29 May 1978). "Observation of Nondipole Electron Impact Vibrational Excitations: H on W (100)". Physical Review Letters. 40 (22). American Physical Society (APS): 1463–1466. Bibcode:1978PhRvL..40.1463H. doi:10.1103/physrevlett.40.1463. ISSN 0031-9007.
