= Maki Kawai =

Japanese chemist

- 川合眞紀
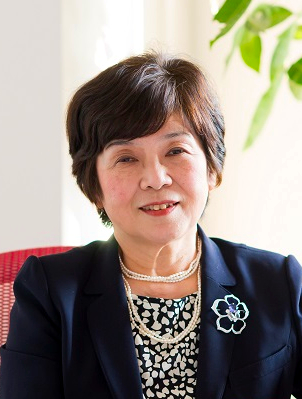
- Maki Kawai
- Education: University of Tokyo
- Scientific career
- Workplaces: University of Tokyo; Riken; Institute for Molecular Science
- Website: www.k.u-tokyo.ac.jp/pros-e/person/maki_kawai/maki_kawai.htm

Maki Kawai (川合眞紀, Kawai Maki) is a Japanese chemist who developed spatially selective single-molecule spectroscopy. In 2018, she became the first woman to become president of the Chemical Society of Japan.

== Early life and education ==
Kawai earned her bachelor's degree at the University of Tokyo in 1975. She completed her doctoral studies at the University of Tokyo in 1980. Her PhD was supervised by Kenji Tamaru.

== Research and career ==
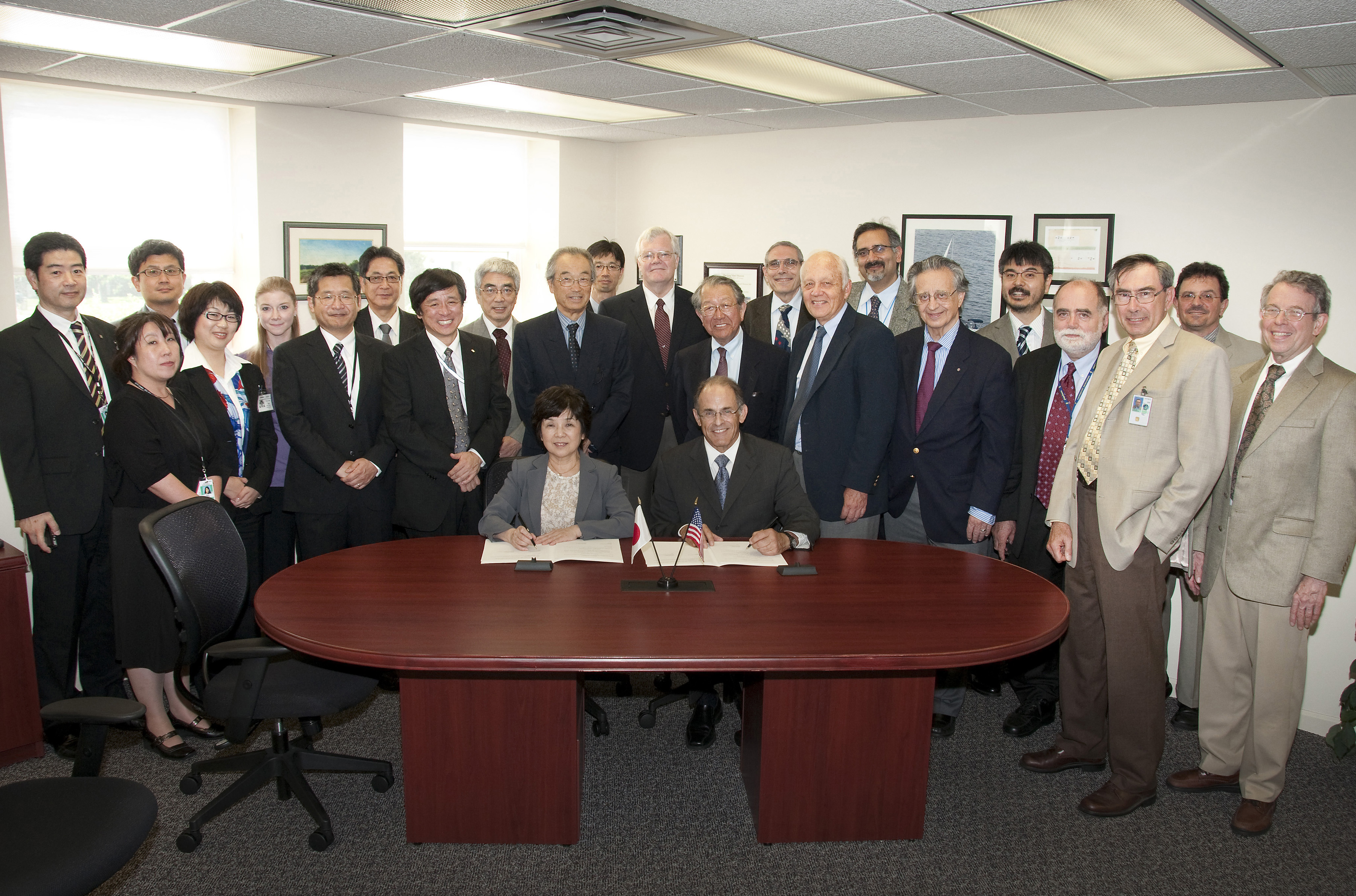
With Sam Aronson (Signing Ceremony for the agreement between Brookhaven National Laboratory and Riken, 2012)

Kawai was a postdoctoral researcher at Riken between 1980 and 1982. She joined the University of Tokyo as a Japan Society for the Promotion of Science fellow in 1982. Her research considers the vibrational dynamics of single-molecules at surfaces. Her group use STM to monitor molecules and atoms on top of surfaces. She uses this to understand the chemical and physical phenomena of nanowires, nanodots and biomolecules. She was awarded fellowships from the Surface Science Society of Japan and American Physical Society to develop single molecule spectroscopy. Her group monitor the vibrational and relaxation energies of single molecules using scanning tunneling microscopy and inelastically tunnelled electrons. She has contributed to several books and hundreds of peer-reviewed publications. Kawai continued to be supported by the Japan Society for the Promotion of Science, investigating nanoscale electron transport through molecular layers. By combining single molecule spectroscopy (using scanning tunneling spectroscopy) with inelastic electron tunneling spectroscopy to identify electron transfer channels. She discovered a new reaction pathway on the surface of titanium dioxide.

Kawai became Chief Scientist and Director of Surface Chemistry Laboratory at Riken in 1991 and an executive director in 2010. She was made a professor at the University of Tokyo in 2004. Kawai joined the Institute of Molecular Science as Director General in 2016. She was appointed President of the Chemical Society of Japan in 2018.

== Awards and honours ==
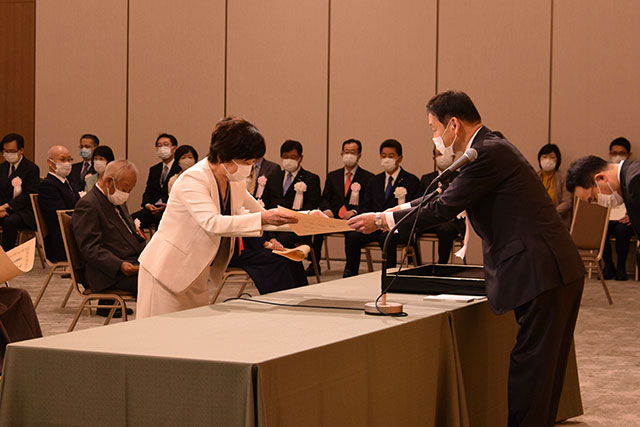
With Shinsuke Suematsu (Award Ceremony for the Persons of Cultural Merit, November 4, 2021)

- 2021: Person of Cultural Merit
- 2020: Asian Scientist 100, Asian Scientist
- 2019: L'Oréal-UNESCO For Women in Science Awards
- 2018: Honorary Fellow of the Royal Society of Chemistry (UK)
- 2018: Kiel University Diels-Planck Lecture
- 2017: Medal of Honor with Purple Ribbon from the Japanese government
- 2016: American Vacuum Society Medard W. Welch Award
- 2015: IUPAC Distinguished Women in Chemistry / Chemical Engineering
- 2015: Max Planck Society Gerhard Ertl Lecture Award
- 2012: Mukai Award, Japan
- 2008: Commendation for Science and Technology by the Minister of Education, Culture, Sports, Science and Technology, Prize for Science and Technology
- 2009: Chemical Society of Japan Award
