= Rudolf M. Tromp =

Dr. Rudolf Maria "Ruud" Tromp (born 3 September 1954, Alkmaar) is a Dutch American scientist at IBM Research Division, Thomas J. Watson Research Center and a Physics Professor at Leiden University.

== Education ==
He attended Petrus Canisius College, The Lyceum (Alkmaar).

- 1982 Ph.D. in physics from the University of Utrecht (The Netherlands)
- 1982, completed a thesis on medium-energy ion scattering (MEIS) studies of the structure of silicon surfaces.

== Biography ==
In 1983 he joined IBM at the Thomas J. Watson Research Center, where his scanning tunneling microscopy studies revealed the Si(001) dimer structure for the first time, as well as the spatial distribution of the Si(111) (7 × 7) electronic surface states and their relation to the underlying atomic structure. Using MEIS, he co-invented “surfactant-mediated epitaxial growth,” a technique that allows much-improved control over the morphology of epitaxial films and superlattices.

More recently, his studies have focused on the dynamics of surface and interface processes such as phase transitions, chemisorption and etching, epitaxial growth, and aspects of nanotechnology. Ultrahigh-vacuum transmission electron microscopy and low-energy electron microscopy allow detailed, real-time, in situ observations of such processes with high spatial resolution. Using those techniques, the studies have shed new light on the thermodynamics of epitaxial growth, the dynamic evolution of the surface morphology of epitaxial films, the self-assembly of quantum dots, the spatiotemporal character of first- and second-order phase transitions at surfaces, etc. He has also developed a novel Low Energy Electron Microscopy instrument, including energy filtering and aberration correction.

== Awards ==
- 1981: Wayne B. Nottingham Prize of the Physical Electronics Conference
- 1995: Materials Research Society Medal
- 2003: American Physical Society Davisson-Germer Prize
- 2004: American Vacuum Society Medard W. Welch Award
- 2009: Materials Research Society (MRS) Fellow
- Four IBM Outstanding Innovation and Technical Achievement Awards.
- 2020: National Academy of Engineering Member

Dr. Tromp is a Fellow of the American Physical Society, the American Vacuum Society, the Materials Research Society and of the Boehmische Physical Society.
