= Samuel Wesley Stratton Award =

Annual science and engineering award

The Samuel Wesley Stratton Award has been annually presented by the National Institute of Standards and Technology (NIST, then NBS) since 1962 for "an unusually significant research contribution to science or engineering that merits the acclaim of the scientific world and supports NIST's mission objectives". The award was named after first director of NIST, then NBS, Samuel Wesley Stratton. The award is considered NIST's highest award for fundamental research.

== Recipients ==
- 1971 John L. Hall
- 1973 Marilyn E. Jacox
- 1978 John Yates (chemist) and Theodore E. Madey
- 1987 William Daniel Phillips
- 1993 J. Michael Rowe and John J. Rush
- 1994 Richard D. Leapman, Dale E. Newbury
- 1995 Eric A. Cornell
- 1996 John M. Martinis
- 1997 Wen-Li Wu
- 1998 William F. Egelhoff Jr.
- 1999 David B. Newell, Richard L. Steiner, Edwin R. Williams
- 2000 Robert D. McMichael (Physicist, Materials Science and Engineering Laboratory) "for several breakthroughs in the design of thin-film magnetic materials and devices, which can improve thermal stability and reduce power consumption"
- 2001 Deborah Shiu-Lan Jin
- 2002 Chris A. Michaels (Research Chemist, MML) Lee J. Richter, Stephan J. Stranick
- 2003 David J. Wineland
- 2004 Paul S. Julienne "for world leading theoretical physics research in collisions fundamental to the laser cooling of atoms and Bose-Einstein condensation"
- 2005 Jeffery W. Lynn (NIST Center for Neutron Research)
- 2006 Jun Ye
- 2007 Kent D. Irwin, (Physicist, Electronics and Electrical Engineering Laboratory) "for intellectual leadership in developing world-leading superconducting quantum sensors, which are driving innovation in diverse technical areas."
- 2008 Dietrich G. Leibfried (Physicist, Physics Laboratory) "for the conception and demonstration of a versatile, reliable geometric phase gate, so far the most effective approach to quantum computing research."
- 2009 James C. Bergquist, (Physicist, Physics Laboratory) "for leading the research and development of the world's most precise atomic clock which is based on a single ion of mercury and exquisitely stabilized lasers."
- 2010 Miral M. Dizdar "for scientific and international leadership in developing measurement methods and standards for DNA damage."
- 2011 Daniel Josell (Research Scientist, Material Measurement Laboratory) and Thomas Moffat (Research Metallurgist, Material Measurement Laboratory) "for models and processes for defect-free filling of nanoscale features that revolutionized interconnect technologies in high-speed computer chips"
- 2012 Joseph Stroscio (Physicist, Physical Measurement Laboratory) "for scientific achievements in developing new atomic-scale measurement methods involving low- and ultralow temperature scanning tunneling microscopy."
- 2013 Qingzhen Huang, Jeffrey W. Lynn and Taner Yildirim (NIST Center for Neutron Research) "for elucidating the origins of high temperature superconductivity in iron-based superconductors."
- 2014 Ian B. Spielman (Physicist, Physical Measurement Laboratory) "for transforming the field of quantum simulation by inventing ways to model 'designer' complex systems to solve problems at the frontiers of physics."
- 2015 Emanuel Knill (Physicist, Information Technology Laboratory) "for pioneering research in the field of quantum information science and engineering."
- 2016 Craig Brown (Research Chemist, NIST Center for Neutron Research) "for revealing molecular mechanisms that yield great improvements in gas-separation and catalytic processes in microporous materials"
- 2017 Samuel L. Manzello (Mechanical Engineer, Engineering Laboratory) "for his groundbreaking engineering and scientific research on the vulnerabilities of built structures to ignition from wind-driven firebrand showers produced from wildland-urban interface fires"
- 2018 Savelas A. Rabb (Research Chemist, Material Measurement Laboratory) and Robert D. Vocke (Physical Scientist, Material Measurement Laboratory) "for extraordinary contributions to an international effort to redefine the kilogram"
- 2019 Wei Zhou (Physicist, NIST Center for Neutron Research) "for his innovative use of neutron measurements and computational methods to reveal atomic interactions that significantly improve gas-separation and gas-storage processes in metal-organic frameworks (MOFs)"
- 2020 Nicholas Butch (Physicist, NIST Center for Neutron Research)
- 2021 Mark Stiles (NIST Fellow, Physical Measurement Laboratory)
