= Homer D. Hagstrum =

American physicist

Homer Dupre Hagstrum (March 11, 1915 – September 7, 1994) was an American physicist who specialized in surface physics.

Born in St Paul, Minnesota he gained a BA degree in 1936, an MS in 1939 and a PhD in physics in 1940 at the University of Minnesota, Minneapolis. He then worked for Bell Labs, Murray Hill, New Jersey, where he was a research physicist from 1940 to 1954, head of Surface Physics Research from 1954 to 1978 and Research Physicist in Surface Physics from 1978 to 1985. After 1946 Homer specialized in surface physics which was an unknown sub-field of physics at that time. He developed a metal multipurpose vacuum chamber in 1961 that is a model for many surface physics scientists today.

In 1942 he and John R Pearce traveled to England to meet with British scientists working on RADAR. During this meeting Pearce (who wrote Science fiction stories) arranged a meeting with H. G. Wells, an internationally known science fiction writer. Pearce and Hagstrum also met with Rudy Kompfner during this trip.

Hagstrum was elected a Fellow of the American Physical Society in 1949 and a member of the National Academy of Sciences in 1976. He was chairman of Division of Electron and Atomic Physics of the American Physical Society in 1957,

He was a recipient of the Medard W. Welch Award in 1974 and the Davisson–Germer Prize in 1975.
