= Jean-Luc Brédas =

Belgian-American chemist, professor

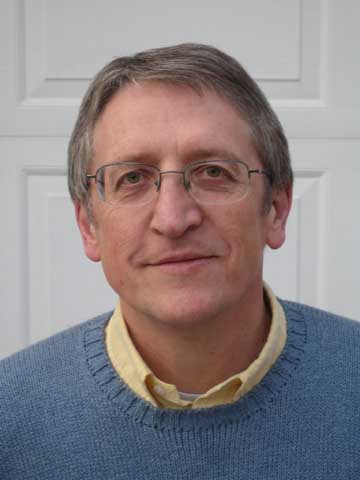
- Born: 23 May 1954; Fraire
- Occupation: Chemist
- Awards: David Adler Lectureship Award (2013); Centenary Prize (2021)
- Academic career
- Institutions: Georgia Tech (2003–2019); King Abdullah University of Science and Technology (2014–2016); University of Arizona (2020–); University of Mons (2000–2019); King Abdulaziz University (2011–2014)

Jean-Luc Brédas is an American chemist, working at the University of Arizona. He was born in Fraire, Belgium, on 23 May 1954.

He received his Ph.D. from the University of Namur, Belgium, in 1979. In 1988, he was appointed Professor at the University of Mons, Belgium, where he established the Laboratory for Chemistry of Novel Materials. While keeping an "Extraordinary Professorship" appointment in Mons, he moved to the US in 1999 and became Full Professor of Chemistry at the University of Arizona. In 2003, he moved to the Georgia Institute of Technology as Full Professor of Chemistry and Biochemistry. In July 2014, he took a 2-½-year leave of absence to King Abdullah University of Science and Technology (KAUST) where he served as Distinguished Professor of Materials Science and Engineering and Director of the KAUST Solar and Photovoltaics Research and Engineering Center. At Georgia Tech, where he resumed his activities in January 2017, he was Regents' Professor of Chemistry and Biochemistry and holds the Vasser-Woolley and Georgia Research Alliance Chair in Molecular Design. He was a Georgia Research Alliance Eminent Scholar from 2005 to 2020. In 2020, he returned to the University of Arizona where he is a Regents Professor in the Department of Chemistry and Biochemistry.

Jean-Luc Bredas is a Member of the International Academy of Quantum Molecular Science, the Royal Academy of Belgium, and the European Academy of Sciences. He is the recipient of multiple awards, including the 1997 Francqui Prize, the 2000 Quinquennial Prize of the Belgian National Science Foundation, the 2001 Italgas Prize, the 2003 Descartes Prize of the European Union, the 2010 Charles H. Stone Award of the American Chemical Society, the 2013 David Adler Lectureship Award in the Field of Materials Physics of the American Physical Society, and the 2016 Award in the Chemistry of Materials of the American Chemical Society. He is a Fellow of the American Chemical Society (Inaugural Class of 2009), American Physical Society, Optical Society of America, Royal Society of Chemistry, and Materials Research Society (Inaugural Class of 2008), and an Honorary Professor of the Institute of Chemistry of the Chinese Academy of Sciences. He holds Honorary Degrees from the University of Linköping, Sweden, and the Free University of Brussels. He has published over 1,000 refereed articles (that –as of January 2023– have garnered over 85,000 citations, leading to a Web of Science h-index of 135) and given over 500 invited presentations. Since 2008, he has served as an Editor for Chemistry of Materials, published by the American Chemical Society.

== Publications ==
- R. H. Friend; R. W. Gymer; A. B. Holmes; et al. (January 1999). "Electroluminescence in conjugated polymers". Nature. 397 (6715): 121–128. Bibcode:1999Natur.397..121F. doi:10.1038/16393. ISSN 1476-4687. S2CID 4328634. Wikidata Q55872554.
- Marius Albota; David Beljonne; Jean-Luc Brédas; et al. (1 September 1998). "Design of organic molecules with large two-photon absorption cross sections". Science. 281 (5383): 1653–1656. Bibcode:1998Sci...281.1653A. doi:10.1126/SCIENCE.281.5383.1653. ISSN 0036-8075. PMID 9733507. Wikidata Q52184674.
- J. Cornil; D. A. dos Santos; X. Crispin; R. Silbey; J. L. Brédas (26 July 2002). "Influence of Interchain Interactions on the Absorption and Luminescence of Conjugated Oligomers and Polymers: A Quantum-Chemical Characterization". Journal of the American Chemical Society. 120 (6): 1289–1299. doi:10.1021/JA973761J. ISSN 0002-7863. S2CID 44793152. Wikidata Q114737776.
