= Nitin Samarth =

Nitin Samarth is Verne M. Willaman Professor of Physics in the Eberly College of Science and Professor of Materials Science & Engineering in the Penn State College of Earth and Mineral Sciences, Pennsylvania State University, where he also served as the George A. and Margaret M. Downsbrough Department Head of physics from 2011-2023.

== Life ==
He obtained his undergraduate degree in physics from the Indian Institute of Technology Bombay in 1980 and his Ph.D. in physics from Purdue University in 1986. Samarth's research interests center on spintronic phenomena in thin films and nanostructures derived from semiconductors, magnetic materials and superconductors. He has pioneered the synthesis of a variety of materials in this context, resulting in key advances in semiconductor spintronics and, more recently, topological spintronics. Samarth's research is published in over 200 articles and has over 31,000 citations (GoogleScholar).

Samarth is a Member of the American Academy of Arts and Sciences (2026), Fellow of the American Physical Society (2003) and Fellow of the American Association for the Advancement of Science (2013). In 2024, he received the David Adler Lectureship Award from the American Physical Society. His other honors include the Distinguished Science Alumnus Award from Purdue University (2026), Distinguished Alumnus Award from IIT Bombay(2019), the Outstanding Physics Alumnus Award from Purdue University (2008), the Faculty Scholar Medal in the Physical Sciences from Penn State(2008) and the George W. Atherton Award for Teaching Excellence from Penn State (2007).
