= Krishnan Raghavachari =

American chemist (born 1956)

- Born: 3 April 1953 (age 72); Chennai, Tamil Nadu, India
- Education: BSc at University of Madras; MSc at Indian Institute of Technology Madras; PhD at Carnegie Mellon University
- Alma mater: Carnegie Mellon University; Indian Institute of Technology Madras
- Known for: Quantum chemistry
- Awards: Davisson–Germer Prize in 2009
- Scientific career
- Institutions: Indiana University Bloomington
- Thesis: (1981)
- Doctoral advisor: Sir John Anthony Pople

Krishnan Raghavachari (born 3 April 1953, in Chennai, India) is a Professor of Chemistry at Indiana University Bloomington.

Raghavachari began his education in his native India, completing his undergraduate degree in 1973 at Madras University and his masters from the Indian Institute of Technology in 1975. Following this, he moved to the United States to attend Carnegie-Mellon University for his doctorate under the tutelage of John Pople, completing it in 1981. Upon completing his degree, Raghavachari entered the private sector as a research scientist at Bell Labs. He served as a member of the technical staff until 1987 when he was named a distinguished member. In 2002, he joined the faculty at Indiana University.

Raghavachari has been credited as one of the top quantum chemists in the United States and responsible for developing methods allowing for widespread use of computational chemistry. Among the methods he has developed over his career are CCSD(T), used to evaluate bond energies and the properties of molecules and the Gaussian-2, 3, and 4 methods. Over the course of his career, Raghavachari has given over 150 invited lectures, published over 320 scientific papers, and has been cited over 50,000 times by others in the field. He has also served as chair of the Theoretical Chemistry Subdivision of the American Chemical Society, on the editorial boards of the Journal of Physical Chemistry, Journal of Computational Chemistry, Theoretical Chemistry Accounts, and Journal of Materials Research.

== Honours and awards ==
- 2009 Davisson-Germer Prize in Surface Physics, American Physical Society
- 2008 Fellow of the Royal Society of Chemistry
- 2001 Fellow of the American Physical Society
