= Jacqueline Krim =

American condensed matter physicist

Jacqueline Krim is an American condensed matter physicist specializing in nanotribology, the study of film growth, friction, and wetting of nanoscale surfaces. She is a Distinguished University Professor of Physics at North Carolina State University.

== Education and career ==
Krim graduated from the University of Montana in 1978 and completed a Ph.D. in experimental condensed matter physics at the University of Washington in 1984. After postdoctoral research at Aix-Marseille University, she became a faculty member at Northeastern University, and moved to North Carolina State University in 1998.

== Recognition ==
Krim is a fellow of the American Vacuum Society (1999) and the American Physical Society (2000). The Division of Materials Physics of the American Physical Society named her as their David Adler Lecturer for 2015. In 2019 she was elected as a fellow of the American Association for the Advancement of Science "for distinguished contributions to the understanding of atomic-scale friction, wetting and surface roughening and for exemplary efforts in scientific outreach and diversity". She received a National Science Foundation Presidential Young Investigator Award in 1986.
