= Ivan K. Schuller =

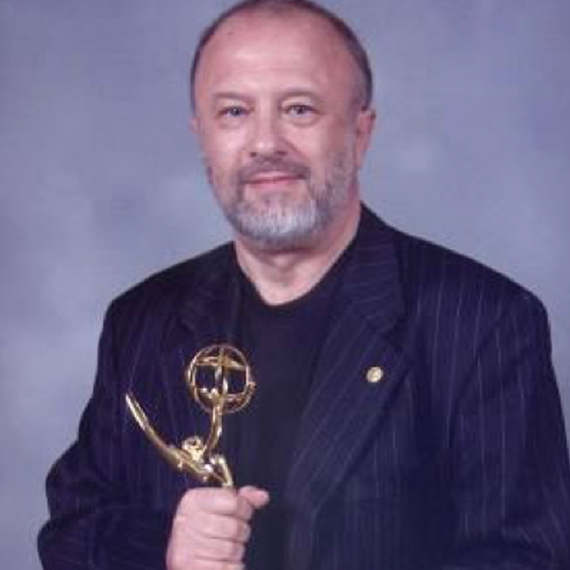
File photo of Ivan K. Schuller

Ivan K. Schuller (born 1946 in Romania) is an American condensed matter experimental physicist. He is born 1946 in Cluj, Northern Transylvania, which belonged to Hungary until 1947. He is best known for his work on superlattices, exchange bias and neuromorphic devices. His interests are focused on thin films, nanostructures, novel materials, magnetism, and superconductivity and more recently in Neuromorphic Computing.

Schuller received his Licenciado (1970) from the University of Chile, MS degree (1972) and PhD (1976) from Northwestern University. From 1978 to 1987, he was a senior physicist and group leader at Argonne National Laboratory. Since 1987, he has been a professor of physics at the University of California, San Diego; in addition to this position, he is also Layer Leader-Materials and Devices of CAL-(IT)2 Institute, and was director of several AFOSR-MURIs at UCSD. He held visiting professorships at the Catholic University - Santiago, Chile; Universidad del Valle, Colombia; the Catholic University-Leuven, Belgium, the Rheinisch-Westfälische Technische Hochschule Aachen, Germany, Universidad Complutense de Madrid, and University of Paris.

Currently he is a Distinguished Professor, holder of Research Chair V of the Center for Memory and Recording Research (CMRR) and director of the Quantum Materials for Energy Efficient Neuromorphic Computing research center at the University of California San Diego.

== Major Awards ==
Prof. Schuller received the following major scientific awards:

- Lawrence Award from the Department of Energy (DOE) - 2004
- Vannevar Bush Fellow from the Department of Defense (DOD) - 2015
- Adler Award from the American Physical Society (APS) - 2003
- MRS Medal from the Materials Research Society (MRS) - 2003
- Distinguished Lecturer from the Institute of Electrical and Electronics Engineers(IEEE) - 2015
- Doctorate Honoris Causa from Universidad Complutense, Madrid Spain - 2005
- Appointed Fellow of the American Academy of Arts and Sciences (AAAS) - 2018
- Appointed Member of the Chilean - 1992, Belgian - 1998, Spanish - 2005, Colombian - 2013 and Latin American - 2019 Academies of Science -
- He was also recipient of several awards for his TV activities including a Regional EMMY award for his movie "When Things Get Small."

== Selected Accomplishments ==
Prof. Schuller is known for the following selected accomplishments:

1. First direct measurement of the relaxation time of the superconducting energy gap
2. Discovery of enhanced magnetoresistance in Cu/Ni superlattices
3. Development of metallic superlattices
4. Determination of the phase diagram and structure of the YBCO superconductor
5. Development of phase spread alloy in search of new materials
6. Discovery of photoinduced superconductivity in oxides
7. Discovery of positive exchange bias and dynamical exchange coupling in ferromagnetic-anti-ferromagnetic heterostructures
8. Discovery of Thermally Assisted Sequential Tunneling, a new electrical transport mechanism in organic semiconductors
9. Development of Magnetic Field Modulated Microwave Spectroscopy (MFMMS) the most sensitive and selective method for the detection of superconductivity
10. New DNA sequencing using cross correlations and multiplexing
11. Investigated the importance of highly connected interactions on the Corona virus infection
12. Invention of artificial thermal neuron

== Notable Publications ==
- Experimental Observation of the Relaxation Time of the Order Parameter in Superconductors. Ivan K. Schuller and K.E. Gray, Phys. Rev. Lett. 36, 429 (1976).
- Transport Properties of the Composition Modulated Alloy Cu/Ni. Ivan K. Schuller, Charles M. Falco, J. Hilliard, J. Ketterson, B. Thaler, R. Lacoe, and R. Dee, Modulated Structures-1979, AIP Conference Proc. 53, 417 (1979).
- A New Class of Layered Materials. Ivan K. Schuller, Phys. Rev. Lett. 44, 1597 (1980)
- Phase Diagram and Superconductivity in the Y-Ba-Cu-O System. D.G. Hinks, L. Soderholm, D.W. Capone II, J.D. Jorgensen, Ivan K. Schuller, C.U. Segre, K. Zhang and J.D. Grace, Appl. Phys. Lett. 50, 1688 (1987).
- Structure of the Single Phase High Temperature Superconductor YBa 2 Cu 3 O 7-d. M.A. Beno, L. Soderholm, D.W. Capone II, D.G. Hinks, J.D. Jorgensen, Ivan K. Schuller, C.U. Segre, K. Zhang and J.D. Grace, Appl. Phys. Lett. 51, 57 (1987).
- Methodology and Search for Superconductivity in the La-Si-C System, J. de la Venta, Ali C. Basaran, T. Grant, A.J.S. Machado, M.R. Suchomel, R.T. Weber, Z. Fisk, and Ivan K. Schuller, Supercond. Sci. Tech. 24, 075017 (2011).
- Photoinduced Enhancement of Superconductivity. G. Nieva, E. Osquiguil, J. Guimpel, M. Maenhoudt, B. Wuyts, Y. Bruynseraede, M.B. Maple, and Ivan K. Schuller, Appl. Phys. Lett. 60, 2159 (1992).
- Positive Exchange Bias in FeF 2 -Fe Bilayers. J. Nogues, D. Lederman, T.J. Moran and Ivan K. Schuller, Phys. Rev. Lett. 76, 4624 (1996).
- Exponential Behavior of the Ohmic Transport in Organic Films. Corneliu N. Colesniuc, Rudro R. Biswas, Samuel A. Hevia, Alexander V. Balatsky, and Ivan K. Schuller, Phys. Rev. B, 83, 085414 (2011)
- Magnetic Field Modulated Microwave Spectroscopy (MFMMS) across Phase Transitions and the Search for New Superconducting Materials. J.G Ramirez, Ali C. Basaran, J. de la Venta, Juan Pereiro, and Ivan K. Schuller, Rep. Prog. Phys. 77, 093902 (2014).
- The impact of the suppression of highly connected protein interactions on the Corona virus infection. Felipe Torres, Miguel Kiwi, Ivan K. Schuller. Scie. Rep. 12, 9188 (2022)
- Improving Sequencing by Tunneling with Multiplexing and Cross-correlations, P. Boynton, A.V. Balatsky, I.K. Schuller, and M. DiVentra, J. Comput. Electron, 13, 794 (2014). doi.org/10.1007/s10825-014-0571-2
- A Caloritronics-Based Mott Neuristor. Javier del Valle, Pavel Salev, Yoav Kalcheim, Ivan K. Schuller, Sci Rep 10, 4292 (2020).
