= Model solid approximation =

The model solid approximation is a method used for determining the extrema of energy bands in semiconductors. The method was first proposed for silicon-germanium alloys by Chris G. Van de Walle and Richard M. Martin in 1986 and extended to several other semiconductor materials by Van de Walle in 1989. It has been used extensively for modelling semiconductor heterostructure devices such as quantum cascade lasers.

Although the electrostatic potential in a semiconductor crystal fluctuates on an atomic scale, the model solid approximation averages these fluctuations out to obtain a constant energy level for each material.
