= Ernst G. Bauer =

German-American physicist (born 1928)

Ernst Bauer
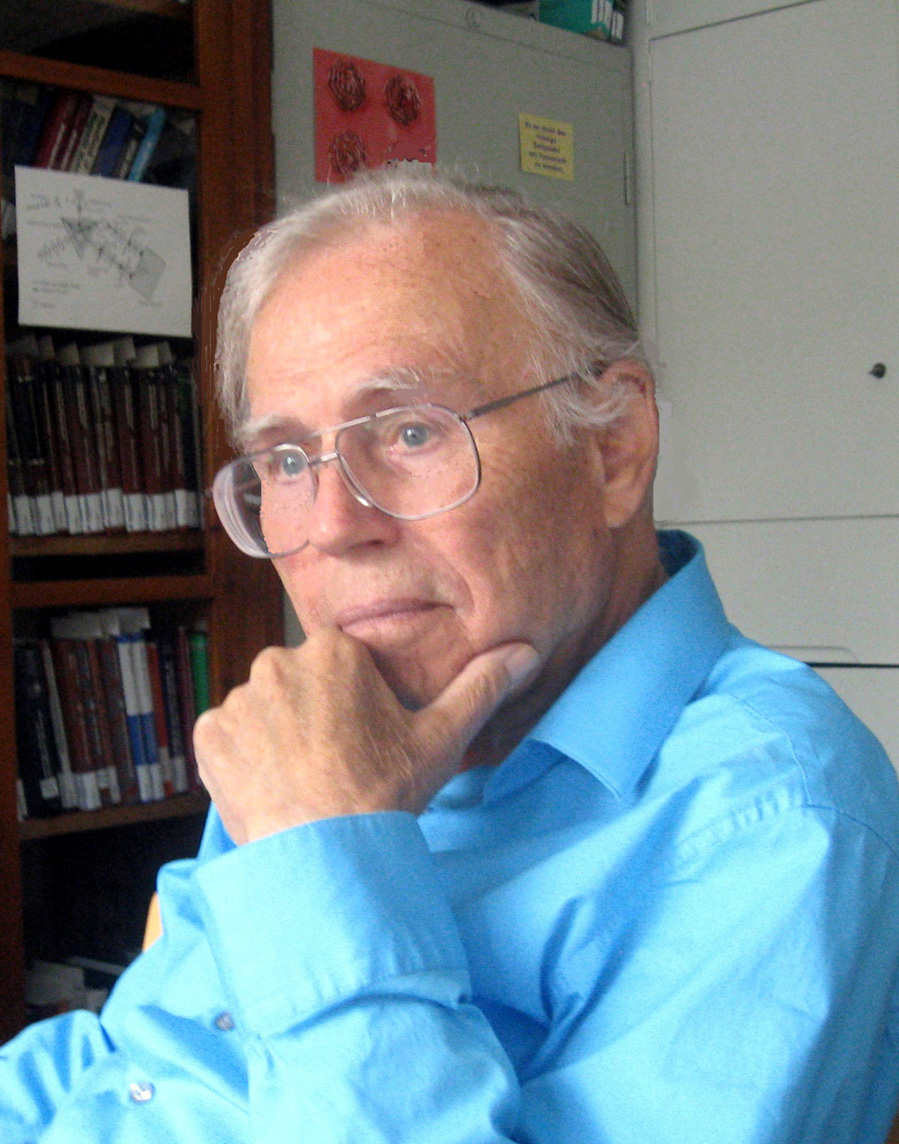
- Ernst Bauer 2013
- Born: February 27, 1928 (age 98); Germany
- Education: Ludwig-Maximilians-Universität München
- Known for: Pioneering Low Energy Electron Microscopy
- Awards: Gaede Prize of the German Vacuum Society (1988) Medard W. Welch Award of the American Vacuum Society (1992) Davisson-Germer Prize of the American Physical Society (2005)
- Scientific career
- Fields: Physics
- Workplaces: Arizona State University

Ernst G. Bauer (born February 27, 1928) is a German-American physicist known for his studies in the field of surface science, thin film growth and nucleation mechanisms and the invention in 1962 of the Low Energy Electron Microscopy (LEEM). In the early 1990s, he extended the LEEM technique in two directions by developing Spin-Polarized Low Energy Electron Microscopy (SPLEEM) and Spectroscopic Photo Emission and Low Energy Electron Microscopy (SPELEEM). He is currently Distinguished Research Professor Emeritus at the Arizona State University.

== Biography ==
Ernst Bauer studied at the Ludwig-Maximilians-Universität München, Germany, where he received his master's degree MS (1953) and Doctor of Philosophy PhD (1955) degrees in physics. In 1958, he moved to the Michelson Laboratory in China Lake, California, where he became the Head of the Crystal Physics Branch and a U.S. citizen. He assumed the position of Professor and Director of the Physics Institute at the Technical University Clausthal, Germany, in 1969. He was appointed Distinguished Research Professor in 1991 at the Arizona State University. He continued his research activity in Germany until 1996. Since 1996 he has worked full-time at the Arizona State University, and since 2010 he is Distinguished Research Professor Emeritus working part-time in ASU.

== Thin films and surfaces ==
Bauer has contributed to the field of epitaxy and film growth since the mid-1950s. He started his scientific career in Munich with the study of the growth and structure of antireflection layers with electron microscopy and electron diffraction. His PhD thesis was concerned with the structure and growth of thin evaporated layers of ionic materials and was the first systematic extensive study of epitaxial and fiber orientation growth combining electron microscopy and electron diffraction. He derived in 1958 a classification of the basic thin film growth modes, which he called Frank-van der Merwe (layer-by-layer growth), Volmer-Weber (island growth) and Stranski-Krastanov growth (layer+island growth). His thermodynamic criterion and terminology are used worldwide today. In the same year Bauer's book on "Electron diffraction: theory, practice and application" appeared.

Soon after his arrival at the Michelson Laboratory in California, he started in situ thin film growth studies by conventional electron microscopy, Ultra high vacuum UHV reflection electron diffraction, Low-energy electron diffraction LEED and Auger electron spectroscopy. The importance of adsorption on the initial growth of thin films led him also to adsorption studies.

Bauer realized already in 1961 that electron microscopy using the diffracted electrons for imaging would be extremely important for the future of the surface science. The invention in 1962 of the Low Energy Electron Microscope (LEEM) was stimulated by a scientific dispute with Lester Germer about his interpretation of low energy electron diffraction (LEED) patterns in 1960. He constructed the first LEEM instrument and reported it at the Fifth International Congress for Electron Microscopy in 1962. In the 1960s he developed also the theoretical background needed for the understanding of LEEM.

After he moved to the Technical University Clausthal (Germany) in 1969 Bauer built up a broadly based surface science group encompassing a large variety of electron and ion beam techniques as well as optical methods. The quantitative analysis of thermal desorption spectroscopy (TDS or TPD) was developed, a method now used widely in particular in surface chemistry. Work function measurements were developed and used for the determination of the thermodynamic properties of two-dimensional systems with attractive lateral interactions. He developed electron stimulated desorption (ESD) and static SIMS for the study of adsorbed layers and ultrathin films on single crystal surfaces; alkali ion scattering (ISS) for structural analysis of surfaces; field ion microscopy (FIM) of single atoms and clusters; UHV-SEM studies of surface melting.

== Surface electron microscopy with low energy electrons (LEEM, SPLEEM, SPELEEM, PEEM etc.) ==
Bauer invented Low Energy Electron Microscopy (LEEM) already in 1962 but he had to overcome intense skepticism of scientists and also many scientific and funding obstacles before finally LEEM came to fruition in 1985. His work was brought to the attention of a much wider general scientific community in the nineteen eighties, when LEEM began producing the real-time high-resolution dynamic image recordings of atomic processes such as crystal nucleation and growth, sublimation, phase transitions and epitaxy on surfaces. The high signal intensities available in LEEM (compared to X-ray imaging) allowed observing surface structure and dynamic processes in real space and real time at sample temperatures up to 1500 K with 10 nm lateral resolution and atomic depth resolution.

In the late 1980s early 1990s Bauer extended the LEEM technique in two important directions by developing Spin-Polarized Low Energy Electron Microscopy (SPLEEM) and Spectroscopic Photo Emission and Low Energy Electron Microscopy (SPELEEM). The combination of these methods now allows a comprehensive (structural, chemical, magnetic and electronic) characterization of surfaces and thin films on the 10 nm scale.

The success of the instrument developments in Bauer's group in Technical University Clausthal has led to the commercial production of these instruments and stimulated several other groups to develop similar instruments for surface imaging with low energy electrons, resulting in a variety of commercial instruments. Today there are hundreds of the various versions of these instruments in the world and are further developed, continuously broadening their application range. Bauer's work directly or indirectly impacts many areas of modern materials science: surfaces, thin films, electronic materials, catalysis and instrumentation. The invention and development of surface microscopy with low energy electrons has revolutionized the study of surface science and thin film science.

Bauer has authored or co-authored more than 470 publications (among them 88 review papers and book chapters) and two books: "Electron Diffraction: Theory, Practice and Applications", 1958 (in German) and "Surface Microscopy with Low Energy Electrons", 2014.

== Awards ==
- Gaede Prize of the German Vacuum Society (1988) – "For the invention of the Low Energy Electron Microscope"
- Elected Member of the Göttingen Academy of Sciences, Germany (1989)
- Fellow of the American Physical Society (1991)
- Medard W. Welch Award of the American Vacuum Society (1992) – "For his contributions to the fundamental understanding of thin film nucleation and growth and for his invention, development and use of multiple surface characterization techniques to study those thin films"
- Niedersachsenpreis for Science (1994) – "For the development of LEEM and for his thin film research"
- Fellow of the American Vacuum Society (1994)
- Award of the Japan Society for Promotion of Science's 141st Committee on Microbeam Analysis (2003) – "For outstanding research on microbeam analysis and contributions to the JSPS 141 Committee"
- BESSY Innovation Award on Synchrotron Radiation (2004) – "Excellent contributions towards the development of the photoelectron emission microscope (PEEM) as energy, space and time resolved detection system of photoelectrons."
- Davisson-Germer Prize of the American Physical Society (2005) – "For contributions to the science of thin-film nucleation and growth, and for the invention of Low Energy Electron Microscopy"
- Humboldt Research Prize (2008)- "For his excellent achievements in solid state physics"
- Doctor Honoris Causa, University Maria Sklodowska-Curie, Lublin, Poland (2008)
- Fellow of the Elettra Sincrotrone Trieste, Italy (2013) – "Professor Ernst Bauer is a distinguished physicist and surface scientist who has given fundamental contributions to the understanding of epitaxial growth mechanisms and to the development of microscopy techniques"
- Doctor Honoris Causa, Wroclaw University, Wroclaw, Poland (2014)
- International Fellow of the Japanese Society of Applied Physics (2015) – "Recognition of foreign researchers who have made remarkable contributions to the progress of applied physics through the international activities related to JSAP"
- Honorary professor of the Chongqing University, China (2015) – "For outstanding academic achievements"

== Selected References ==
1. Bauer, Ernst (1958). "Phänomenologische Theorie der Kristallabscheidung an Oberflächen. I". Zeitschrift für Kristallographie. 110 (1–6): 372–394. Bibcode:1958ZK....110..372B. doi:10.1524/zkri.1958.110.1-6.372. ISSN 0044-2968.
2. Telieps, W.; Bauer, E. (1985). "An analytical reflection and emission UHV surface electron microscope". Ultramicroscopy. 17 (1): 57–65. doi:10.1016/0304-3991(85)90177-9. ISSN 0304-3991.
3. Bauer, E.; van der Merwe, Jan H. (1986). "Structure and growth of crystalline superlattices: From monolayer to superlattice". Physical Review B. 33 (6): 3657–3671. Bibcode:1986PhRvB..33.3657B. doi:10.1103/PhysRevB.33.3657. ISSN 0163-1829. PMID 9938773.
4. Bauer, E. (1991). "Ultrathin Metal Films: From One to Three Dimensions Plenary Lecture". Berichte der Bunsengesellschaft für physikalische Chemie. 95 (11): 1315–1325. doi:10.1002/bbpc.19910951102. ISSN 0005-9021.
5. Bauer, E.; Franz, T.; Koziol, C.; Lilienkamp, G.; Schmidt, T. (1997). "Recent Advances in LEEM/PEEM for Structural and Chemical Analysis". Chemical, Structural and Electronic Analysis of Heterogeneous Surfaces on Nanometer Scale. pp. 75–91. doi:10.1007/978-94-011-5724-7_5. ISBN 978-94-010-6414-9.
6. Bauer, Ernst (2012). "LEEM Basics". Surface Review and Letters. 05 (6): 1275–1286. doi:10.1142/S0218625X98001614. ISSN 0218-625X.
7. Zdyb, R.; Bauer, E. (2002). "Spin-Resolved Unoccupied Electronic Band Structure from Quantum Size Oscillations in the Reflectivity of Slow Electrons from Ultrathin Ferromagnetic Crystals". Physical Review Letters. 88 (16) 166403. Bibcode:2002PhRvL..88p6403Z. doi:10.1103/PhysRevLett.88.166403. ISSN 0031-9007. PMID 11955243.
8. Locatelli, A; Bauer, E (2008). "Recent advances in chemical and magnetic imaging of surfaces and interfaces by XPEEM". Journal of Physics: Condensed Matter. 20 (9) 093002. doi:10.1088/0953-8984/20/9/093002. ISSN 0953-8984. S2CID 117948724.<
9. Bauer, Ernst; Man, Ka L.; Pavlovska, Anastassia; Locatelli, Andrea; Menteş, Tevfik O.; Niño, Miguel A.; Altman, Michael S. (2014). "Fe3S4(greigite) formation by vapor–solid reaction". J. Mater. Chem. A. 2 (6): 1903–1913. doi:10.1039/C3TA13909C. ISSN 2050-7488.
10. Lewandowski, Mikołaj; Groot, Irene M. N.; Qin, Zhi-Hui; Ossowski, Tomasz; Pabisiak, Tomasz; Kiejna, Adam; Pavlovska, Anastassia; Shaikhutdinov, Shamil; Freund, Hans-Joachim; Bauer, Ernst (2016). "Nanoscale Patterns on Polar Oxide Surfaces". Chemistry of Materials. 28 (20): 7433–7443. doi:10.1021/acs.chemmater.6b03040. ISSN 0897-4756.
11. Pavlovska A.; Dobrev D. and Bauer E. (2019). "High Temperature Equilibrium and Growth Shape of Small Particles: The Case of Thallium", J. Phys. Chem. C 123 (13): 8000–8004. doi:10.1021/acs.jpcc.8b07411. ISSN 1932-7455
