= Nora Berrah =

Algerian physicist

- Citizenship: Algerian
- Education: University of Algiers(diploma in physics in 1979) University of Virginia(PhD)
- Occupation: physicist
- Employer: University of Connecticut
- Title: professor
- Honours: American Physical Society, American Academy of Arts and Sciences in 2019, National Academy of Sciences in 2024

Nora Berrah is an Algerian physicist who studies how light and matter interact. She is a professor at the University of Connecticut, where she previously was chair of the physics department.

Berrah earned a diploma in physics in 1979 from the University of Algiers. She completed her PhD in 1987 from the University of Virginia. She worked from Argonne National Laboratory from 1987 to 1992, and became a professor at Western Michigan University in 1999. She moved to the University of Connecticut in 2014.

Berrah was elected as a fellow of the American Physical Society in 1999. In 2014 she won the Davisson–Germer Prize in Atomic or Surface Physics "for pioneering experiments on the interaction of atoms, molecules, negative ions and clusters with ionizing vacuum ultraviolet and soft x-ray photons". She was elected to the American Association for the Advancement of Science (AAAS) in 2018 and her citation is for "For distinguished contributions to the field of molecular dynamics, particularly for pioneering non-linear science using x-rays free electron lasers and spectroscopy using synchrotron light sources". She was elected to the American Academy of Arts and Sciences in 2019 and the National Academy of Sciences in 2024.
