= International Union for Vacuum Science, Technique and Applications =

International scientific organization

- Abbreviation: IUVSTA
- Formation: 1958
- Type: NPO
- Region served: Worldwide
- Members: >100,000
- Official language: English language, French, German
- President: Jay Hendricks
- Website: iuvsta.org

The International Union for Vacuum Science, Technique, and Applications (IUVSTA) is a union of 35 science and technology national member societies that supports collaboration in vacuum science, technique and applications.

Founded in 1958, IUVSTA is an interdisciplinary union which represents several thousands of physicists, chemists, materials scientists, engineers and technologists who are active in basic and applied research, development, manufacturing, sales and education. IUVSTA finances advanced scientific workshops, international schools and technical courses, worldwide.

The main purposes of the IUVSTA are to organize and sponsor international conferences and educational activities, as well as to facilitate research and technological developments in the field of vacuum science and its applications.

== History ==
In 1958 Emil Thomas founded the International Union For Vacuum Science and Technology (IVOST) in Namur, Belgium. The IVOST was then dissolved in 1962, and a new constitution was drafted in Brussels, Belgium,forming the International Union for Vacuum Science, Technique, and Application (IVUSTA), with Medard W. Welch chosen as its president. The structure of the IUVSTA differed from its predecessor organization as members were represented by delegates from local vacuum organizations in their respective countries, whereas the IVOST consisted of individual members from various countries

== Membership ==
IUVSTA is a Union (or federation) of National Vacuum Societies. There can be only one member society (or National Committee) in any one nation. This Society must be representative of the scientific and technical fields encompassed by the Divisions of IUVSTA. Where appropriate a Society can represent more than one nation. IUVSTA can only recognise societies in geographical areas recognised by the United Nations as independent nations.

=== Member societies ===
National Vacuum Societies of the 2022-2025 Triennium
Country	Name of society	Common name
Argentina	Asociacion Física Argentina	Argentinian Physical Society
Australia	Vacuum Society of Australia	Australian Vacuum Society
Austria	Österreichische Gesellschaft für Vakuumtechnik	Austrian Vacuum Society
Belgium	Société Belge de Vacuologie et de Vacuotechnique/Belgische Vereniging voor Vacuologie en Vacuumtechniek (BELVAC)	Belgian Vacuum Society (BELVAC)
Brazil	Sociedade Brasileria de Vácuo (SBV)	Brazilian Vacuum Society
Bulgaria	Съюз на Физиците в България	Union of Physicists in Bulgaria
China	Chinese Vacuum Society	Chinese Vacuum Society (CVS)
Croatia	Hrvatsko Vakuumsko Drusto	Croatian Vacuum Society
Cuba	Cuban Physical Society	Cuban Physical Society
Czech Republic	Ceská vakuová spolecnost	Czech Vacuum Society
Finland	Suomen Tyhjioseura	Finnish Vacuum Society
France	Société Francaise du Vide (S.F.V)	French Vacuum Society
Germany	Deutsch Vakuum-Gesellschaft (DVG)	German Vacuum Society
Hungary	Magyar Vákuumtársaság	Hungarian Vacuum Society
India	Indian Vacuum Society	Indian Vacuum Society
Iran	Iranian Vacuum Society	Iranian Vacuum Society
Israel	Israeli Vacuum Society: Science, Technology and Applications (IVS)	Israeli Vacuum Society
Italy	Associazione Italiana di Scienza e Tecnologia (AIV)	Italian Society for Science & Technology (AIV)
Japan	Nihon Hyomen Shinku Gakkai	The Japan Society of Vacuum and Surface Science
South Korea	Hankook Jinkong Hoakhoe	Vacuum Society of Korea
Mexico	Sociedad Mexicana de Ciencia y Tecnología de Superficies y Materiales (SMCTSM)	Mexican Vacuum Society
Netherlands	Nederlandse Vacuumvereniging (NEVAC)	Dutch Vacuum Society
Pakistan	Pakistan Vacuum Society	Pakistan Vacuum Society
Philippines	Vacuum Society of the Philippines (VSP)	Vacuum Society of the Philippines
Poland	Polskie Towarzystwo Pròzniowe	Polish Vacuum Society
Portugal	Sociedade Portuguesa de Vácuo (SOPORVAC)	Portuguese Vacuum Society
Russia	Russian Scientific & Technical Vacuum Society	Russian Vacuum Society
Serbia	Српско вакуумско друштво (СВД)	Serbian Vacuum Society
Slovakia	Slovenská vákuová spoloènost	Slovak Vacuum Society
Slovenia	Drustvo za vakuumsko tehniko Slovenije	Drustvo za vakuumsko tehniko Slovenije
Spain	Asociación Española del Vació y sus Aplicaciones (ASEVA)	Spanish Vacuum Society
Sweden	Svenska Vakuum Sällskapet (SVS)	Swedish Vacuum Society
Switzerland	Schweizerische Gesellschaft für Vakuum-Physik und -Technik (SGV)/ Societé Suisse pour la Science et la Technique du Vide (SSSTV)	Swiss Vacuum Society
United Kingdom	British Vacuum Council	British Vacuum Council
United States	American Vacuum Society	American Vacuum Society

== Technical divisions ==
- Applied surface science
- Biointerfaces
- Electronic materials & processing
- Nanometer structures
- Plasma science and technologies
- Surface engineering
- Surface science
- Thin film
- Vacuum science and technology

== Activities ==
=== Conference organization ===
- European Conference on Surface Science (ECOSS) annual series in collaboration with the European Physical Society.
- European Vacuum Conference series. Biennial.
- International Thin Film Conference.
- International Vacuum Congress and Exhibition, for all areas of activity of the Union. Triennial.
- Vacuum and Surface Sciences Conference of Asia and Australia (VASSCAA). Biennial.

=== Workshops and education ===
- Workshops on front-line research.
- An education program for both technically developed and developing countries in the form of schools, webinars and technical training courses.

=== Standards and prizes ===
- Interaction with the International Organization for Standardization on the establishment of international vacuum standards.
- The awarding of international prizes:
  - The IUVSTA Prize for Science
  - The IUVSTA Prize for Technology
  - The IUVSTA EBARA Award
  - The IUVSTA Medard W. Welch International Scholarship
  - The IUVSTA Elsevier Student Travel Awards

== External affiliations ==
IUVSTA maintains formal links with other Non-Government Organizations involved in education, and the promotion and dissemination of science and associated techniques. With the support of IUVSTA divisions, fruitful cooperation with UNESCO, ISC, ICTP and TWAS have been initiated and developed. Such contacts facilitate the organization of specialized workshops and may offer financial support for students attending short courses, seminars and congresses. Links with other organizations such as ISO are the responsibility of the IUVSTA divisions.

=== United Nations Educational, Scientific and Cultural Organization (UNESCO) ===
IUVSTA has been admitted to UNESCO in the “Relations Operationnelles” category.

=== International Science Council (ISC) ===
IUVSTA is a Scientific Associate of the International Science Council (formerly International Council of Scientific Unions, ICSU)

=== International Centre for Theoretical Physics (ICTP) ===
IUVSTA cooperates financially and scientifically with International Centre for Theoretical Physics (ICTP) in the organization of workshops of high scientific level held in Trieste. These workshops address a post-graduate and post-doctoral audience from the lesser developed countries.

=== Third World Academy of Sciences (TWAS) ===
Preliminary contacts have been made with Third World Academy of Sciences (TWAS) which foresees the organization of short courses on rough vacuum techniques and applications dedicated to technicians.

=== International Standards Organization (ISO) ===
IUVSTA has a formal liaison with the International Standards Organization (ISO). IUVSTA sends a representative to the TC/201 Surface Chemical Analysis committee and to the ISO TC/112 Vacuum Technology committee. These links are maintained via the Applied Surface Science and Vacuum Science and Technology divisions, respectively.

== Structure and organization ==
=== Current primary officers ===
President: (United States) Jay Hendricks
President Elect: (Netherlands) Freek Molkenboer
Past President: (Belgium) François Reniers
Secretary General: (Austria) Christoph Eisenmenger-Sittner
Scientific Director: (Japan) Katsuyuki Fukutani
Scientific Secretary: (Australia) Anton Stampfl
Treasurer: (Belgium) Arnaud Delcorte
Recording Secretary (non-voting officer): (Portugal) Ana Gomes Silva

=== Current national councillors ===
Country	Councillor	Alternate Councillor
Argentina	Maria Carmen Asensio	Miguel Darío Sánchez
Australia	Anton P.J. Stampfl	Richard Clements
Austria	Paul Heinz Mayrhofer	Wolfgang Werner
Belgium	Diederik Depla	François Reniers
Brazil	Pedro A. P. Nascente	Marcelo J. Ferreira
Bulgaria	Evgenia Valcheva	Ivan Petrov
China	Hongjun Gao	Zhenchao Dong
Croatia	Maja Mičetić	NIkša Krstulović
Cuba	María Sánchez Colina	Kalet León Monzón
Czech Republic	Stanislav Novák	Karel Mašek
Finland	Timo Sajavaara	Jari Koskinen
France	Sylvie Bourgeois	Grégory Marcos
Germany	Sven Ulrich	Ute Bergner
Hungary	László Óvári	Attila Csík
India		
Iran	Majid Ghanaatshoar	Masoud Mahjour-Shafiei
Israel	Tatyana Bendikov	Ytzhak Mastai
Italy	Fabrizio Giorgis	Enrico Maccallini
Japan	Yasunori Tanimoto	Katsuyuki Fukutani
South Korea	Jin-Hyo Boo	Junghoon Joo
Mexico	Emmanuel Haro Poniatowski	Francisco Servando Aguirre Tostado
Netherlands	Sense Jan van der Molen	Freek Molkenboer
Pakistan	Javaid Ahsan Bhatti	Suleman Qaiser
Philippines	Christian Lorenz Mahinay	Hernando Salapare III
Poland	Markowski Leszek	Kwoka Monika
Portugal	Carlos Tavares	Orlando Teodoro
Russia		
Serbia	Suzana Petrović	Ivana Cvijović-Alagić
Slovakia	Andrej Vincze	Peter Šiffalovič
Slovenia	Miran Mozetič	Alenka Vesel
Spain	Miguel Manso Silván	Celia Rogero
Sweden	Pär Omling	Ulf Karlsson
Switzerland	Jörg Patscheider	Martin Wüest
United Kingdom	Timo Gans	Deborah O’Connell
United States	Gregory J. Exarhos	Ivan G. Petrov

=== List of presidents ===
The president under the early federation was:
1958-1962 — (Belgium) Emil Thomas

Past and present presidents of IUVSTA:
2025-2028 — (United States) Jay Hendricks
2022-2025 — (Belgium) François Reniers
2019-2022 — (France) Anouk Galtayries
2016-2019 — (Sweden) Lars Montelius
2013-2016 — (Italy) Mariano Anderle
2010-2013 — (Belgium) Jean Jacques Pireaux
2007-2010 — (United States) J.W. "Bill" Rogers, Jr.
2004-2007 — (Italy) Ugo Valbusa
2001-2004 — (France) M.-G. Barthes-Labrousse
1998-2001 — (United Kingdom) D. Phillip Woodruff
1995-1998 — (Australia) John L. Robins
1992-1995 — (United States) Theodore E. Madey
1989-1992 — (Spain) Jose L. de Segovia
1986-1989 — (Germany) Heribert Jahrreiss
1983-1986 — (Hungary) Janos Antal
1980-1983 — (United States) James M. Lafferty
1977-1980 — (United Kingdom) Leslie Holland
1974-1977 — (Netherlands) Albertus Venema
1971-1974 — (United States) Luther E. Pruess
1968-1971 — (Germany) Kurt Diels
1965-1968 — (France) Jean Debiesse
1962-1965 — (United States) Medard W. Welch

Honorary presidents
2021 — (Hungary) Peter Barna
1989 — (Belgium) E. Thomas
1983 — (Liechtenstein) H.C. M. Auwärter
1977 — (United States) Mr. M. W. Welch
1962 — (France) L. Dunoyer
1962 — (United Kingdom) M. Pirani

Honorary and founding members of the Union
(United Kingdom) Mr. A.S.D. Barrett
(France) Mlle. M. Berthaud
(France) D. Degras
(Germany) K. Diels
(Belgium) E. Thomas
(Netherlands) A. Venema
(United States) Mr. M.W. Welch
