= Heike Riel =

German physicist, specialising in nanotechnology

Heike E. Riel (born 1971) is a nanotechnologist known for developing OLED displays. She works for IBM Research – Zurich, where she is Director of IoT Technology and AI Solutions, and Director of the Physical Sciences Department. Beyond her work on display technology, she is an expert in molecular electronics and nanoscale semiconductors.

== Education and career ==
Riel has a diploma in physics from the University of Erlangen-Nuremberg. She completed her doctorate (Dr. rer. nat.) in 2003 at the University of Bayreuth, and in 2011 earned an MBA at the Henley Business School of the University of Reading.

She worked as an intern at HP Labs in Palo Alto, California before joining IBM Research in 1998.

== Recognition ==
Riel became an IBM Fellow in 2013. In 2015 she joined the Academy of Sciences Leopoldina and the Swiss Academy of Engineering Sciences, and in the same year was given an honorary doctorate by Lund University.

In 2017 she was chosen by the American Physical Society as the winner of their David Adler Lectureship Award in the Field of Materials Physics "for seminal achievements in the science and technology of nanoscale electronics, particularly the exploration of novel materials such as semiconducting nanowires, molecules and organic materials for future nanoscale devices, and outstanding presentations and outreach for general audiences". In 2020 she was named a fellow of the American Physical Society "for scientific and technical accomplishments in materials and device research for nanoscale electronics in the fields of semiconducting nanowires and organic light-emitting devices for display applications".
