= Stephen Kevan =

American condensed matter physicist (born 1954)

Stephen Douglas Kevan (born 1954) is an American condensed matter physicist who researches "surface and thin film physics; electronic structure and collective excitations at surfaces; nanoscale spatial and temporal fluctuations in magnetic and other complex materials". He served as the director of the Advanced Light Source (ALS) at Lawrence Berkeley National Laboratory in Berkeley, California. He is also a faculty member on leave from the University of Oregon and served as division deputy for science at the ALS prior to his directorship.

== Education ==
Kevan graduated Summa cum Laude from Wesleyan University in 1976 with a B.A. in chemistry. In 1980 he earned a Ph.D. in physical chemistry from the University of California, Berkeley, working with David Shirley, with a dissertation entitled Normal Emission Photoelectron Diffraction: a New Technique for Determining Surface Structure.

== Career ==
Kevan worked at Bell Laboratories as a member of technical staff from 1980-1986. In 1986 he joined the faculty at the University of Oregon (UO) as an associate professor of physics; since 1991 he has held a full professorship. From 2007 to 2012, he was Physics Department Head and was also director of the University of Oregon Materials Science Institute. On leave from UO, Kevan previously served as Deputy Division Director for Science at the Advanced Light Source at Lawrence Berkeley National Laboratory. He has also served as associate editor and North American regional editor of the New Journal of Physics.

Kevan's 30-year research career has focused on assuring the health and vitality of synchrotron light sources in the United States and abroad. He has contributed to condensed matter physics and physical chemistry through understanding how microscopic interactions and fluctuations produce novel material properties, particularly in the context of surface and thin film physics and exotic magnetism. His early Fermiology studies using photoemission verified experimentally the Fermi surface nesting mechanism for the spin density wave ground state of chromium and also contributed to understanding electronic instabilities in charge density wave materials and surface reconstructions. He also characterized the role of non-adiabatic damping of adsorbate vibrations and the spin-splitting of surface bands by the Rashba (spin-orbit) effect.

More recently he has probed the microscopic-macroscopic connection, developing tools to study microscopic magnetic fluctuations using coherent soft x-ray beams. His current emphasis is to probe, on the scale of a few domains, intermittent dynamics and memory effects in field- and thermally driven magnetization reversal. Understanding the impact of newly discovered hidden symmetries on these cascades is important to understanding microscopic intermittency in a much broader context.

== Honors ==
- 2017 Davisson–Germer Prize in Atomic or Surface Physics "for the development of angle resolved photoemission spectroscopy (ARPES) leading to groundbreaking surface science."
- 2001 Fellow of the American Association for the Advancement of Science
- 1998 ALS Science Prize (the Shirley Prize)
- 1995 Fellow of the American Physical Society
- 1987 Alfred P. Sloan Foundation Research Fellowship
- 1986 National Science Foundation Presidential Young Investigator Award
- 1986 IR 100 Award
- 1979-80 Amoco Graduate Fellowship
- 1978-79 University of California, Regents Fellowship
- 1976-77 University of California, University Fellowship
- 1976 Summa cum laude
- 1976 Phi Beta Kappa

== Professional societies, affiliations, and service ==
- North American regional editor, New Journal of Physics
- Associate editor, New Journal of Physics 2008-2012
- Chairperson, Advanced Light Source Science Advisory Committee, 2000-3
- Chairperson, Advanced Light Source Users Executive Committee, 1988–90, 1999
- Chairperson, Physical Electronics Conference Organizing Committee, 1993-6
- Advanced Light Source Users Executive Committee, 1987–90, 1997–99
- Institute for Defense Analysis, Defense Sciences Study Group, 1994–95
