= Robert Ecke =

American experimental physicist (born 1953)

- Born: Robert Everett Ecke; February 4, 1953 (age 73); Los Angeles, California, United States
- Education: University of Washington
- Known for: Rayleigh-Bénard convection, Two-Dimensional Turbulence, Chaos, Granular Material
- Awards: Fellow of American Physical Society, Fellow of American Association for the Advancement of Science, Los Alamos National Laboratory Fellow's Prize, Los Alamos National Laboratory Fellow
- Scientific career
- Fields: Statistical Physics, Experimental Fluid Dynamics, Soft Matter Physics
- Workplaces: Los Alamos National Laboratory, University of Washington
- Academic advisors: J. Gregory Dash
- Website: Ecke Website

Robert Everett Ecke is an American experimental physicist who is a laboratory fellow and director emeritus of the Center for Nonlinear Studies (CNLS) at Los Alamos National Laboratory and Affiliate Professor of Physics at the University of Washington. His research has included chaotic nonlinear dynamics, pattern formation, rotating Rayleigh-Bénard convection, two-dimensional turbulence, granular materials, and stratified flows. He is a Fellow of the American Physical Society (APS) and of the American Association for the Advancement of Science (AAAS), was chair of the APS Topical Group on Statistical and Nonlinear Physics, served in numerous roles in the APS Division of Fluid Dynamics, and was the Secretary of the Physics Section of the AAAS.

== Education and early life ==
Ecke was born in Los Angeles, California, in February 1953. He grew up in Helena, Montana and graduated from the University of Washington in 1975 with a B.S. in Physics (with Distinction) and Phi Beta Kappa. He received his PhD in physics, also from the University of Washington, under J. Gregory Dash in 1982 studying Kosterlitz-Thouless melting in low-temperature helium monolayers on graphite.

== Career and research ==
After a brief postdoctoral research position with Oscar Vilches at University of Washington, he became a Director's Funded Postdoctoral Fellow with John Wheatley at Los Alamos National Laboratory in fall of 1983 where he pursued cryogenic convection and chaotic dynamics. He became a technical staff member in the Condensed Matter and Thermal Physics Group of the Physics Division in 1986 where he did research on chaos and nonlinear dynamics in Rayleigh-Bénard convection of a ^{3}He-superfluid ^{4}He mixture and on pattern formation in rotating convection and in compositional convection. Later, he studied turbulence in Rayleigh-Bénard convection with and without rotation and pattern formation in high-pressure gaseous convection, including experiments on spiral defect chaos. In 1997, he was appointed to the position of Laboratory Fellow and continued to expand his research into two-dimensional turbulence, granular chain dynamics, granular media dynamics, stick-slip motion in an earthquake experiment, solutal convection, and turbulent mixing in stratified flows. In 2004, he became the director of the Center for Nonlinear Studies, where he directed research on condensed matter physics, quantum information, information science, non-equilibrium and nonlinear physics, biophysics, and computational chemistry. Robert Ecke has published more than 110 research articles and has an h-index of 43 with 5400 citations according to his Google Scholar profile.

== Awards ==
- Phi Beta Kappa, University of Washington, 1975
- Director's Funded Postdoctoral Fellow, Los Alamos National Laboratory, 1983
- Los Alamos National Laboratory Fellow's Prize, 1991
- Fellow of American Physical Society, 1994
- Los Alamos National Laboratory Fellow, 1997
- Fellow of American Association for the Advancement of Science, 2005
- American Physical Society Outstanding Referee, 2019
