= Patricia Thiel =

American surface chemist (1953–2020)

Patricia A. Thiel
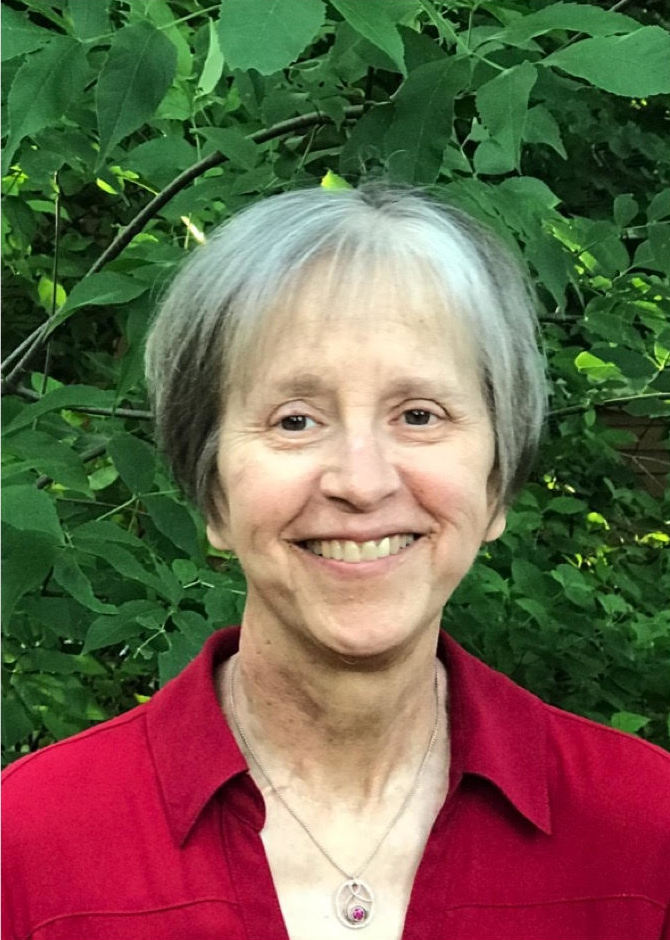
- Patricia Thiel in Ames, Iowa (June 2020) Photo courtesy of Ellen R. Thiel
- Born: February 20, 1953; Adrian, Minnesota, US
- Died: September 7, 2020 (aged 67)
- Education: Macalester College; California Institute of Technology
- Known for: Pioneering research on atomic-scale structures and processes on solid surfaces
- Awards: 2014 Medard W. Welch Award; 2019 American Academy of Arts and Sciences
- Scientific career
- Fields: Chemistry (physical chemistry), materials science
- Workplaces: Iowa State University; Ames Laboratory; LMU Munich
- Doctoral advisor: W. Henry Weinberg
- Other academic advisors: Gerhard Ertl

Patricia Ann Thiel (February 20, 1953 – September 7, 2020) was an American chemist and materials scientist who served as a distinguished professor of chemistry at Iowa State University. She was known for her research on atomic-scale structures and processes on solid surfaces.

== Early life and education ==
Thiel was raised on a farm in southwest Minnesota, near her birthplace of Adrian, Minnesota. Her parents grew up in immigrant farm families and each had completed an eighth grade education. Thiel herself attended a private elementary school nearby her farm in Lismore, Minnesota, for grades 1-8 and public high school in Adrian, Minnesota for grades 9-12. Support from the National Merit Scholarship Program enabled her to attend Macalester College in St. Paul, Minnesota, where she was inspired by her freshman chemistry course and its instructor, Prof. Emil Slowinski to major in chemistry. She completed a BA in chemistry with a minor in mathematics in 1975, graduating summa cum laude. After working for a year at Control Data Corporation as an analytic chemist, she enrolled in the chemistry department at the California Institute of Technology, with financial support from a National Science Foundation Predoctoral Fellowship. She completed a PhD in chemistry in 1981 under the supervision of W. Henry Weinberg.

== Career ==
Thiel's first appointment after graduation was as an Alexander von Humboldt Fellow at LMU Munich, where she worked in the research group of Gerhard Ertl, who later went on to receive the 2007 Nobel Prize in Chemistry. In 1982, she joined the technical staff of Sandia National Laboratories in Livermore, California, and, after a brief stint as a visiting professor in the physics department of the University of California, Berkeley, joined the chemistry department faculty of Iowa State University in 1983, with a simultaneous appointment as staff scientist with the US Department of Energy's Ames Laboratory. She was subsequently promoted to the ranks of associate professor (1988), full professor (1991) and distinguished professor (2001). She received an additional appointment as professor of materials science and engineering in 2012. During her time at Iowa State, Thiel was a supervisor for the thesis research of around thirty PhD students and ten Master's students. Throughout this time period she received outstanding teaching awards, and held several administrative posts, including program director for materials chemistry (Ames Laboratory; 1988–2004), chief research officer (Ames Laboratory; 2008–2009) and chair of the Iowa State Chemistry Department (1999-2002). Thiel was an associate editor of The Journal of Chemical Physics (2013–2020). She attended the Nobel Prize ceremony on December 10, 2011, where Dan Shechtman received the 2011 Nobel Prize in Chemistry for the discovery of quasicrystals. In 2019, Theil was elected to the American Academy of Arts and Sciences.

== Research ==
Thiel's research elucidated atomic-scale structures and processes on solid surfaces, in areas relevant to microelectronics, tribology, heterogeneous catalysis, and nanoscience. She published over 300 research papers, which have been cited about 12,000 times, effective 2019. She is especially known for work in the following three areas.

=== Surfaces of quasicrystals ===
Thiel's research group pioneered studies of nucleation and growth of metal films on quasicrystal surfaces, demonstrating that local pseudomorphic growth, including starfish-shaped formations, can occur at very specific nucleation sites. Focusing on metallic, aluminum-rich quasicrystals, Thiel and her collaborators extensively explored how quasicrystal atomic-scale surface structures were related to their unusual surface properties, including low friction, low adhesion, and good oxidation resistance.

=== Interaction of water with metal surfaces ===
Thiel's Ph.D. research described evidence for hydrogen bonding between water molecules on a ruthenium surface. She continued her research on water as a faculty member at Iowa State University, and discovered that desorption kinetics of water can exhibit a measurable isotope effect. She was credited with being the first to propose that bilayers of water near solid surfaces could possess a structure similar to the basal plane of Ice Ih. She was the co-author, along with Theodore E. Madey, of a highly cited and comprehensive review article describing the interactions and properties of water near solid surfaces.

=== Nucleation, growth, and coarsening of metal nanostructures on surfaces ===
Thiel's group was credited with discovering that large two-dimensional islands of metal adatom clusters can have significant room temperature mobility on metal substrates, and that, contrary to what had usually been assumed, this can be the main route to coarsening (an evolution to larger sizes and fewer numbers) of these clusters. She and James W. Evans are responsible for first describing an atomic-scale mechanism for metal film growth, which they dubbed 'downward funneling'. Because of this mechanism, they predicted an unusual variation in film roughness with temperature from theory, and eventually confirmed it experimentally using scanning tunneling microscopy. This is now accepted as an important mechanism that affects thin film morphology upon growth at low temperature.

More recently, her group discovered a series of naturally occurring metal-sulfur complexes with distinct stoichiometries, which may influence stability of larger metallic features by assisting surface metal transport and hence coarsening. She was highlighted for this work in the Journal of Physical Chemistry's virtual issue highlighting 66 women in honor of Marie Curie's 150th birthday. She and her collaborators also discovered that metallic nanoparticles can be grown as encapsulated clusters near the surface of a layered material, graphite, if specific growth conditions are met. Applying a continuum elasticity model, they developed insight into the reasons for the low, flattened shapes (high aspect ratios) of these embedded particles, and a prediction that the shape of encapsulated metal islands should be universal (size-independent).

== Awards and honors ==
- 1984 Alfred P. Sloan Foundation Fellowship
- 1985 Presidential Young Investigator Award of the National Science Foundation
- 1986 Camille Dreyfus Teacher-Scholar Award
- 2005 Doctor Honoris Causa from the Institute National Polytechnique de Lorraine
- 2008 Iota Sigma Pi Honorary Member
- 2010 Arthur W. Adamson Award for Distinguished Service in the Advancement of Surface Chemistry
- 2010 David Adler Lectureship Award in the Field of Materials Physics, "For seminal contributions to surface structure and dynamics of complex metallic alloys, including quasicrystals and kinetically limited growth and relaxation of nanostructures in thin metal films."
- 2010 Fellow of the American Association for the Advancement of Science,"For increasing the level of understanding of surface properties of metallic quasicrystals, and for work on pathways by which metallic nanoclusters and thin films form and rearrange on metal surfaces."
- 2011 John D. Corbett Professor in Chemistry
- 2012 Fellow of the Materials Research Society (MRS), "For seminal contributions to understanding the structure, reactivity, and tribology of quasicrystal surfaces, and to understanding growth and stability of metal nanostructures and metal thin films."
- 2014 Physical Review Journals - Outstanding Referee
- 2014 Medard W. Welch Award, "For seminal contributions to the understanding of quasicrystal surfaces and thin-film nucleation and growth."
- 2019 Elected to the American Academy of Arts and Sciences

== Personal life ==
Thiel was born on February 20, 1953, in Adrian, Minnesota. She married James William Evans, an Australian-born physicist, in 1988. They have two daughters, both engineers. Thiel died of undetected breast cancer on September 7, 2020, at her home surrounded by her husband and daughters.
