= Thor Rhodin =

- Born: December 9, 1920
- Died: February 17, 2006 (aged 85); Ithaca, New York
- Education: Haverford College (B.S.); Princeton University (Ph.D.)
- Scientific career
- Fields: Applied and Engineering Physics
- Workplaces: Cornell University
- Doctoral advisor: Hugh Scott Taylor
- Doctoral students: Ward Plummer

Thor Nathaniel Rhodin (December 9, 1920 – February 17, 2006) was an American professor of Applied and Engineering Physics at Cornell University and the University of Chicago's James Franck Institute, and is credited with pioneering work in the birth and evolution of surface science beginning with his research on surface sensitivity using auger electron spectroscopy. He played a major role, over several decades, in shaping the development of the field from fundamental work, using the field ion microscope, on the imaging and bonding of individual atoms at surfaces to the fundamentals of surface catalysis of hydrocarbon chemistry by the transition metals.

== Education ==
- B.S. 1942 (Haverford College);
- Ph.D. 1946 (Princeton University)

== Academic genealogy ==
- Thor Rhodin was a student of Hugh Scott Taylor.
  - Taylor was a student of Frederick George Donnan and Henry Bassett [Ref.1].
    - Donnan was trained by Friedrich Wilhelm Ostwald.
      - Ostwald's adviser was Schmidt, Carl,
        - who was a student of Justus von Liebig.
    - Bassett was trained by Adolf von Baeyer and Victor Villiger.
      - Baeyer was a student of Robert Bunsen and Friedrich August Kekulé.
        - Bunsen was a student of Friedrich Stromeyer.
        - Kekulé was a student of Heinrich Will.

== Sources ==
http://www.scs.uiuc.edu/~mainzv/Web_Genealogy/Info/rhodintn.pdf
