= Axel Hoffmann =

American electrical engineer

Axel Hoffmann is an electrical engineer at the Argonne National Laboratory in Argonne, Illinois. He was named a Fellow of the Institute of Electrical and Electronics Engineers (IEEE) in 2014 for his contributions to nanomagnetism and manipulation of spin current.
