= Donald R. Hamann =

American physicist (1939-)

- Born: 1939 (age 86–87); Valley Stream, New York
- Citizenship: United States
- Awards: Davisson-Germer Prize
- Scientific career
- Fields: Condensed matter, Electrical engineering, Piezoelectricity, Thermochemistry
- Thesis: (1965)

Donald R. Hamann (born 1939) is an American physicist.

== Early life and education ==
Donald R. Hamann pursued his higher education at the Massachusetts Institute of Technology (MIT), where he completed his Ph.D. in physics in 1965.

== Career and Research ==
Hamann began his professional career at Bell Telephone Laboratories in Murray Hill, New Jersey, where he worked from 1965 until 2001.

In 2001, he joined Rutgers University as a visiting scientist in the Department of Physics and Astronomy.

== Awards and recognition ==
In 1979, he was awarded the Davisson-Germer Prize in Atomic or Surface Physics by the American Physical Society.
