= Harald Ibach =

German physicist

Harald P. W. Ibach (born 15 April 1941 in Rheine) is a German solid state physicist.

== Education and career ==
Ibach received his doctorate in 1969 from RWTH Aachen University with his dissertation Thermische Ausdehnung von Silizium und Zinkoxid (Thermal expansion of silicon and zinc oxide) and habilitated there in 1972 with his habilitation thesis: Low energy electron spectroscopy — a tool for studies of surface vibrations. From 1975 he was a docent and then a professor ordinarius at RWTH Aachen University, as well as director of the Institut für Schichten und Grenzflächen (Institute for Layers and Interfaces), and chair for Experimental Physics IV A in Jülich. Since 2017 he is a visiting scientist at the Peter Grünberg Institut of the Forschungszentrum Jülich.

He is concerned with surface physics of solids and spectroscopic methods for this, electron energy loss spectroscopy, thin layers, adsorption and reaction of gases on surfaces, vibration spectroscopy on surfaces.

He is the co-author, with Hans Lüth, of a German standard textbook on solid state physics. He also wrote, with Douglas L. Mills, a standard reference on electron energy loss spectroscopy.

In 1992 Ibach received the Europhysics Prize and in 1986 the Medard W. Welch Award.

== Selected publications ==
- as editor: Electron Spectroscopy for Surface Analysis, Springer 1977
- Zur Physik und Chemie der Festkörperoberfläche, Rheinisch-Westfälische Akademie der Wissenschaften, Vorträge Nr. 309, Opladen: Westdeutscher Verlag 1982
- with Douglas L. Mills: Electron Energy Loss Spectroscopy and Surface Vibrations, Academic Press 1982
- with Hans Lüth: Festkörperphysik. Einführung in die Grundlagen, Springer, 1981, 7th edition 2009
  - Solid State Physics. An Introduction to the Principles of Materials Science, English translation, Springer 1996, 4th edition 2009
- Electron Energy Loss Spectrometers, Springer 1991
- Physics of Surfaces and Interfaces, Springer 2006
