= Feng Liu (physicist) =

Materials researcher

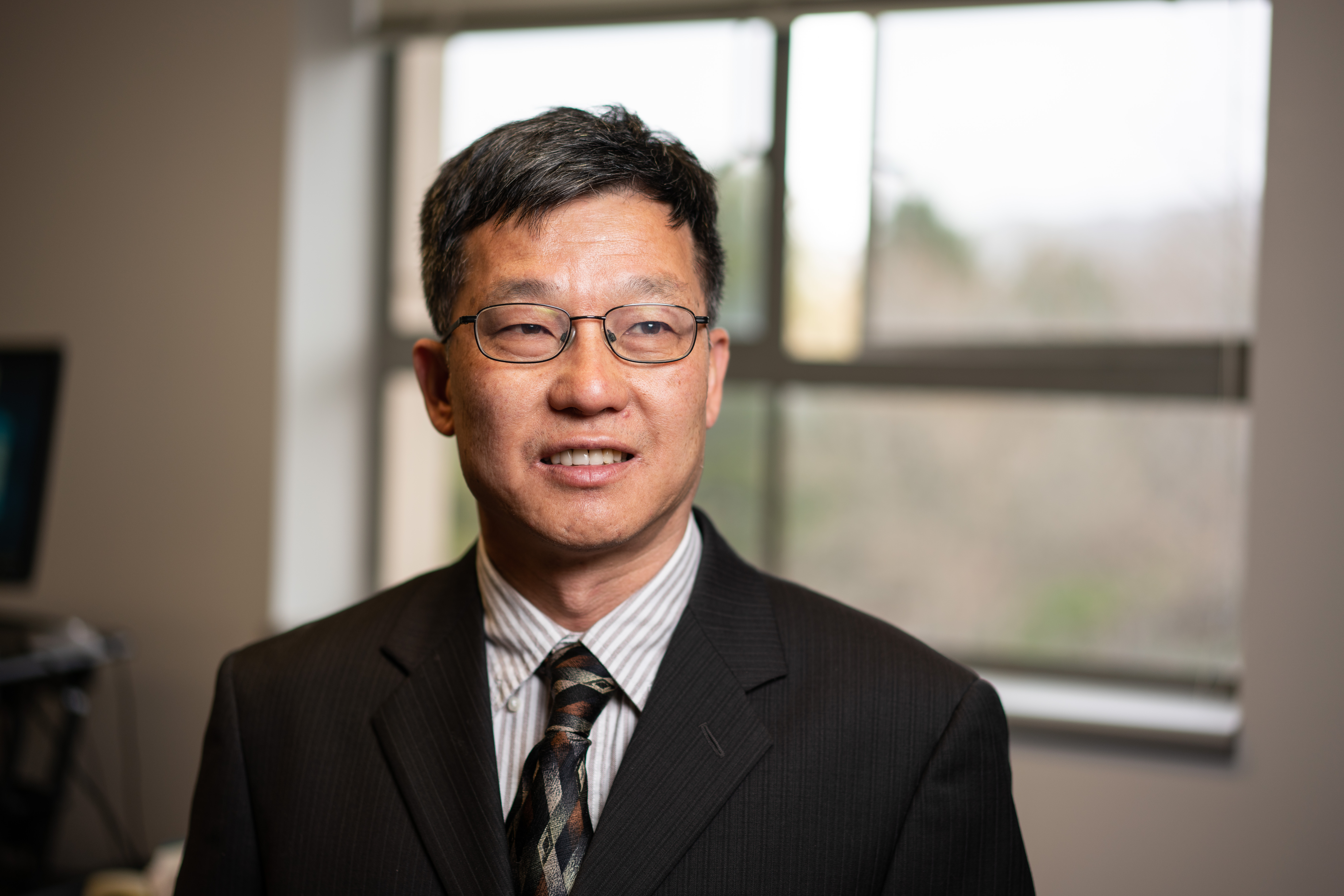
Feng Liu in 2019

Feng Liu is a material physicist and researcher at the University of Utah.

== Life and career ==
Liu earned a bachelor's of science degree in materials science at Tsinghua University in 1984. He left Tsinghua in 1986 with a master's of science in solid state physics and obtained a doctorate in chemical physics at Virginia Commonwealth University in 1990. Liu then served as a postdoctoral researcher for four years, first with Rutgers University, before moving to the Oak Ridge National Laboratory.

Between 1995 and 2000, he worked at the University of Wisconsin–Madison as a research scientist. Liu joined the University of Utah faculty in 2000 and was promoted to a full professorship in 2007. He was elected a fellow of the American Physical Society in 2011, "[f]or contributions to the theory of nanostructures and strain-induced nanoscale self-assembly". In May 2021, Liu was named the Ivan B. Cutler Professor of Materials Science and Engineering at the University of Utah. Liu became a distinguished professor in July of the following year.
