= Robert Gomer =

Austrian chemist

Robert Gomer (24 March 1924, in Vienna, Austria – 12 December 2016) was an Austrian scientist known for his research on field electron emission and field ionization, and his role as an adviser to the United States government.

He was educated at Pomona College and the University of Rochester, where he received his doctorate in 1949. From 1949 to 1950, he was a postdoctoral fellow at Harvard University and worked with G. B. Kistiakowsky. He subsequently moved to the University of Chicago, where he was a professor of chemistry in the James Franck Institute and the department of chemistry.

From 1977 to 1983 he served as director of the James Franck Institute and in 1984 he was appointed Carl William Eisendrath Distinguished Service Professor. He has been honored with numerous awards, including the A. von Humboldt Society Senior U.S. Science Award, the Davisson-Germer Prize of the American Physical Society, the Medard W. Welch Award of the American Vacuum Society, and the Arthur W. Adamson Award for Distinguished Service in the Advancement of Surface Chemistry. He was elected to the National Academy of Sciences in 1981. Prior to his retirement he worked on the editorial boards of several journals, including the Journal of Chemical Physics, Applied Physics, and Annual Review of Physical Chemistry.

He served on numerous scientific committees, including the President's Science Advisory Committee (1961-1965) and the advisory committee for the Directorate of Physical Sciences, Air Force Office of Scientific Research (1961-1975), and was a member of the board of directors of the Universities Space Research Association (1976-1978).

He is the author of Field Emission and Field Ionization (American Vacuum Society Classics), a pioneering vacuum text based on four lectures presented at Harvard University in 1958. He was also a member of the JASON Defense Advisory Group, where he worked to discourage the use of nuclear weapons in the Vietnam War.
