= John Yates (chemist) =

American chemist (1935–2015)

John T. Yates Jr.
- Born: August 3, 1935; Winchester, Virginia
- Died: September 26, 2015 (aged 80); Free Union, Virginia
- Education: Juniata College Massachusetts Institute of Technology
- Scientific career
- Fields: Surface science, Chemistry
- Workplaces: Antioch College; National Institute of Standards and Technology; University of Pittsburgh; University of Virginia

John T. Yates Jr. (August 3, 1935 – September 2015) was an American chemist. He was an investigator in the field of surface chemistry and physics, including both the structure and spectroscopy of atoms and molecules on surfaces, the dynamics of surface processes and the development of new methods for research in surface chemistry.

He worked at the National Bureau of Standards (now NIST) in Washington, D.C., and subsequently at the University of Pittsburgh, where he was for 25 years the R. K. Mellon Professor of Chemistry and Physics as well as the founding director of the Pittsburgh Surface Science Center before moving to the University of Virginia in 2007.

Yates received his bachelor's degree from Juniata College in 1956 and his doctorate in physical chemistry from the Massachusetts Institute of Technology in 1960. He was a senior visiting scholar at the University of East Anglia from 1970 to 1971. Following three years as an assistant professor at Antioch College, he joined the National Bureau of Standards as the scientific staff. Yates was awarded Samuel Wesley Stratton Award in 1978. In 1982 he joined the faculty of the University of Pittsburgh as the first R. K. Mellon Professor of Chemistry and as the director of the University of Pittsburgh Surface Science Center, which he founded. In 1994 he was jointly appointed to the department of physics and astronomy.

Yates served on the editorial boards of six journals and two-book series in surface science and catalysis. He was the co-editor and author of several books and had written more than 720 research papers. He was a member of several leading scientific organizations, including the National Academy of Sciences.

Yates was a professor of chemistry at the University of Virginia in both the engineering school and the college of arts and sciences. He died on September 26, 2015.
