= Max G. Lagally =

- Born: 23 May 1942 (age 83); Darmstadt, Germany
- Citizenship: Germany
- Education: University of Wisconsin–Madison

Max Gunter Lagally (born 23 May 1942, Darmstadt, Germany) is Erwin W. Mueller Professor and Bascom Professor of Surface Science at the University of Wisconsin–Madison.

== Education ==
He received his BS (physics) 1963, Pennsylvania State University, his MS (physics) 1965, University of Wisconsin–Madison, and his Ph.D. (physics) 1968, University of Wisconsin–Madison.

== Awards and honors ==
- His works were cited more than 11,000 times.
- Elected to the National Academy of Engineering in 2001.
- Elected to Fellowship in the American Association for the Advancement of Science (AAAS) in 1999.
- Elected a member of the Deutsche Akademie der Naturforscher - Leopoldina (the German National Academy of Science) in 1999.
- Outstanding Science Alumnus Award, Pennsylvania State University, 1996.
- Davisson-Germer Prize in Atomic or Surface Physics, American Physical Society, 1995.
- Welch Award, AVS, 1991.
