= American Vacuum Society =

AVS
- Formation: June 18, 1953; 72 years ago
- Founded at: New York, New York, U.S.
- Type: 501(c)(3) organization
- Purpose: Scientific professional society
- Headquarters: 125 Maiden Lane, 15B; New York, New York, U.S.
- President: Bridget R. Rogers
- President-Elect: Mark Engelhard
- Affiliations: American Institute of Physics; International Union for Vacuum Science, Technique and Applications
- Website: avs.org
- Formerly called: Committee on Vacuum Techniques

AVS: Science and Technology of Materials, Interfaces, and Processing (formally the American Vacuum Society, Inc. (Note: As stated in the organization's constitution.)) is a professional and scientific society founded in 1953 as a committee on vacuum technology. The AVS supports networking among its approximately 4,500 worldwide members who include representatives of academia, industry, and government. As a member society of the American Institute of Physics, AVS functions as an association of professionals in the scientific disciplines of materials, interfaces, and processing.

The society organizes events, including an annual symposium, and publishes multiple journals, including the Journal of Vacuum Science and Technology (both sections A and B). Additionally, the AVS is a member of the International Union for Vacuum Science, Technique and Applications.

== Organization ==
AVS is composed of 10 technical divisions, two technical groups, 16 regional chapters, two international chapters and one international affiliate:

- Advanced Surface Engineering Division
- Applied Surface Science Division
- Biomaterial Interfaces Division
- Electronic Materials/Photonics Division
- Magnetic Interfaces and Nanostructures Division
- Nanometer-Scale Science and Technology Division
- Plasma Science and Technology Division
- Surface Science Division
- Thin Film Division (TF)
- Vacuum Technology Division

AVS Technical Groups Division

- Manufacturing Science & Technology Technical Group (MSTG)
- MEMS and NEMS Technical Group

== Conferences ==
The AVS International Symposium and Exhibition is AVS's flagship conference. The symposium addresses cutting-edge issues associated with materials, processing, and interfaces in the research and manufacturing communities. AVS also sponsors a variety of topical conferences, including the International Conference on Atomic Layer Deposition and the North American Conference on Molecular Beam Epitaxy.
