= Shang-keng Ma =

Chinese-American physicist (1940–1983)

- 馬上庚
- Born: September 24, 1940; Chongqing, Sichuan, China
- Died: November 24, 1983 (aged 43); La Jolla, California
- Education: University of California, Berkeley
- Scientific career
- Fields: Physics
- Thesis: Correlations of Photons from a Thermal Source (1966)
- Doctoral advisor: Kenneth M. Watson

Shang-keng Ma (September 24, 1940 – November 24, 1983) was a Chinese theoretical physicist, known for his work on the theory of critical phenomena and random systems. He is known as the co-author with Bertrand Halperin and Pierre Hohenberg of a 1972 paper that "generalized the renormalization group theory to dynamical critical phenomena." Ma is also known as the co-author with Yoseph Imry of a 1975 paper and with Amnon Aharony and Imry of a 1976 paper that established the foundation of the random field Ising model (RFIM)

== Biography ==
He transferred in 1959 from the National Taiwan University to the University of California, Berkeley. There he graduated in 1962 with a bachelor's degree in science and in 1966 with a Ph.D. His Ph.D. thesis Correlations of Photons from a Thermal Source was supervised by Kenneth M. Watson. As a postdoc in 1966, Ma went to the University of California, San Diego (UCSD) to study with Keith Brueckner. Ma's outstanding ability earned him a faculty appointment at UCSD in less than a year. He was at the Institute for Advanced Study (IAS) from September 1968 to June 1969 and in the autumn of 1970. There he worked with Shau-Jin Chang on the infinite-energy limit of Feynman diagrams and with Roger Dashen on the S-matrix formulation of statistical mechanics. In 1971 he became a tenured faculty member of the UCSD physics department and became a Sloan Research Fellow.

He visited Cornell University in 1972 where he became involved in development of the renormalization theory of critical phenomena. Gradually, his interest shifted to statistical physics.

In 1975, with Yoseph Imry, he published the seminal paper on the effect of a random magnetic field on ferro-magnetic order. Their model has come to be known as the random field Ising model.

In 1976 Ma was a visiting scientist at Paris-Saclay University and published his paper Renormalization group by Monte Carlo methods, which introduced a technique which "has evolved into a powerful technology that is widely used today for the numerical study of critical phenomena."

In 1981, Ma formulated the "coincidence counting" method for the calculation of entropy from the phase space trajectory. He felt strongly that such a dynamical formulation of entropy was crucial for understanding random and other systems exhibiting metastability.

In the two academic years 1977–1978 and 1981–1982 he taught in Taiwan at National Tsing Hua University, where he wrote an advanced text on statistical mechanics in Chinese — the book, published in 1983, "eschews the traditional approach built on the Gibbs ensemble." World Scientific published an English translation in 1985. In 1986 World Scientific also published a memorial volume in honor of Ma.

== Articles ==
- Ma, Shang-Keng; Woo, Chia-Wei (1967). "Theory of a Charged Bose Gas. I". Physical Review. 159 (1): 165–175. Bibcode:1967PhRv..159..165M. doi:10.1103/PhysRev.159.165.
- Béal-Monod, M. T.; Ma, Shang-Keng; Fredkin, D. R. (1968). "Temperature Dependence of the Spin Susceptibility of a Nearly Ferromagnetic Fermi Liquid". Physical Review Letters. 20 (17): 929–932. Bibcode:1968PhRvL..20..929B. doi:10.1103/PhysRevLett.20.929.
- Chang, Shau-Jin; Ma, Shang-Keng (1969). "Feynman Rules and Quantum Electrodynamics at Infinite Momentum". Physical Review. 180 (5): 1506–1513. Bibcode:1969PhRv..180.1506C. doi:10.1103/PhysRev.180.1506.
- Dashen, Roger; Ma, Shang-Keng; Bernstein, Herbert J. (1969). "S-Matrix Formulation of Statistical Mechanics". Physical Review. 187 (1): 345–370. Bibcode:1969PhRv..187..345D. doi:10.1103/PhysRev.187.345. (over 600 citations)
- Gould, Harvey; Ma, Shang-Keng (1969). "Low-Temperature Ion Mobility in Interacting Fermi Liquids". Physical Review. 183 (1): 338–348. Bibcode:1969PhRv..183..338G. doi:10.1103/PhysRev.183.338.
- Chang, Shau-Jin; Ma, Shang-Keng (1969). "Multiphoton Exchange Amplitudes at Infinite Energy". Physical Review. 188 (5): 2385–2404. Bibcode:1969PhRv..188.2385C. doi:10.1103/PhysRev.188.2385.
- Dashen, Roger; Ma, Shang-Keng (1970). "Singular Three-Body Amplitudes in the Theory of the Third Virial Coefficient". Journal of Mathematical Physics. 11 (4): 1136–1143. Bibcode:1970JMP....11.1136D. doi:10.1063/1.1665239.
- Dashen, Roger; Ma, Shang-Keng (1971). "Singularities in Forward Multiparticle Scattering Amplitudes and the S-Matrix Interpretation of Higher Virial Coefficients". Journal of Mathematical Physics. 12 (4): 689–715. Bibcode:1971JMP....12..689D. doi:10.1063/1.1665636.
- Dashen, Roger; Ma, Shang-Keng (1971). "Scattering Theory and Current Correlations in Classical Gases". Physical Review A. 4 (2): 700–707. Bibcode:1971PhRvA...4..700D. doi:10.1103/PhysRevA.4.700.
- Halperin, B. I.; Hohenberg, P. C.; Ma, S. K. (1972). "Calculation of dynamic critical properties using Wilson's expansion methods". Physical Review Letters. 29 (23): 1548–1551. Bibcode:1972PhRvL..29.1548H. doi:10.1103/PhysRevLett.29.1548.
- Ma, Shang-Keng (1972). "Critical Exponents for Charged and Neutral Bose Gases above λ Points". Physical Review Letters. 29 (19): 1311–1314. Bibcode:1972PhRvL..29.1311M. doi:10.1103/PhysRevLett.29.1311.
- Fisher, Michael E.; Ma, Shang-Keng; Nickel, B. G. (1972). "Critical Exponents for Long-Range Interactions". Physical Review Letters. 29 (14): 917–920. Bibcode:1972PhRvL..29..917F. doi:10.1103/PhysRevLett.29.917. S2CID 67782027. (over 1100 citations)
- Ma, Shang-Keng (1973). "Introduction to the Renormalization Group". Reviews of Modern Physics. 45 (4): 589–614. Bibcode:1973RvMP...45..589M. doi:10.1103/RevModPhys.45.589.
- Halperin, B. I.; Lubensky, T. C.; Ma, Shang-Keng (1974). "First-Order Phase Transitions in Superconductors and Smectic-ALiquid Crystals". Physical Review Letters. 32 (6): 292–295. Bibcode:1974PhRvL..32..292H. doi:10.1103/PhysRevLett.32.292. (over 1000 citations)
- Halperin, B. I.; Hohenberg, P. C.; Ma, Shang-Keng (1974). "Renormalization-group methods for critical dynamics: I. Recursion relations and effects of energy conservation". Physical Review B. 10 (1): 139–153. Bibcode:1974PhRvB..10..139H. doi:10.1103/PhysRevB.10.139. (over 600 citations)
- Imry, Yoseph; Ma, Shang-Keng (1975). "Random-Field Instability of the Ordered State of Continuous Symmetry". Physical Review Letters. 35 (21): 1399–1401. Bibcode:1975PhRvL..35.1399I. doi:10.1103/PhysRevLett.35.1399. (over 3100 citations)
- Ma, Shang-Keng; Rajaraman, R. (1975). "Comments on the absence of spontaneous symmetry breaking in low dimensions". Physical Review D. 11 (6): 1701–1704. Bibcode:1975PhRvD..11.1701M. doi:10.1103/PhysRevD.11.1701.
- Ma, Shang-Keng; Mazenko, Gene F. (1975). "Critical dynamics of ferromagnets in6−εdimensions: General discussion and detailed calculation". Physical Review B. 11 (11): 4077–4100. Bibcode:1975PhRvB..11.4077M. doi:10.1103/PhysRevB.11.4077.
- Dashen, Roger F.; Ma, Shang-Keng; Rajaraman, R. (1975). "Finite-temperature behavior of a relativistic field theory with dynamical symmetry breaking". Physical Review D. 11 (6): 1499–1508. Bibcode:1975PhRvD..11.1499D. doi:10.1103/PhysRevD.11.1499.
- Aharony, Amnon; Imry, Yoseph; Ma, Shang-Keng (1976). "Comments on the critical behavior of random systems". Physical Review B. 13 (1): 466–473. Bibcode:1976PhRvB..13..466A. doi:10.1103/PhysRevB.13.466.
- Aharony, Amnon; Imry, Yoseph; Ma, Shang-Keng (1976). "Lowering of Dimensionality in Phase Transitions with Random Fields". Physical Review Letters. 37 (20): 1364–1367. Bibcode:1976PhRvL..37.1364A. doi:10.1103/PhysRevLett.37.1364. (over 450 citations)
- Ma, Shang-keng (1976). "Renormalization group by Monte Carlo methods". Physical Review Letters. 37 (8): 461–464. Bibcode:1976PhRvL..37..461M. doi:10.1103/PhysRevLett.37.461.
- Ma, Shang-Keng (1978). "Effect of Random Impurities on Long Range Order". Chinese Journal of Physics. 16 (2): 146. Bibcode:1978ChJPh..16..146M.
- Ma, Shang-keng (1981). "Calculation of entropy from data of motion". Journal of Statistical Physics. 26 (2): 221–240. Bibcode:1981JSP....26..221M. doi:10.1007/BF01013169. S2CID 119795687.

== Books ==
- Modern Theory of Critical Phenomena. Frontiers in Physics. Vol. 46. Addison-Wesley. 1976.
  - Modern theory of critical phenomena. Sarat Book House. 1982. ISBN 9788187169864. 1982
  - Ma, Shang-Keng (2018). Modern Theory of Critical Phenomena. doi:10.4324/9780429498886. ISBN 9780429967436.
- Statistical Mechanics. World Scientific. 1985. ISBN 9789971966072. 1985
