= Kenneth M. Watson =

American theoretical physicist and physical oceanographer (1921–2023)

- Born: September 7, 1921; Des Moines, Iowa, U.S.
- Died: August 18, 2023 (aged 101); San Diego, California, U.S.
- Education: Iowa State University; University of Iowa
- Known for: Watson-Lepore renormalization coupling constant
- Awards: Marquis Lifetime Achievement Award
- Scientific career
- Fields: theoretical physics; oceanography
- Workplaces: University of California, Berkeley; University of California, San Diego
- Doctoral advisor: Josef-Maria Jauch
- Doctoral students: Ernest M. Henley; Shang-keng Ma

Kenneth Marshall Watson (September 7, 1921 – August 18, 2023) was an American theoretical physicist and physical oceanographer.

== Life and career ==
Watson graduated in 1943 with BS in electrical engineering from Iowa State College. From 1943 to 1946 he was a researcher at the United States Naval Research Laboratory in Washington, D.C. During his work for the U.S. Navy he went to night school at George Washington University. He graduated from the University of Iowa with Ph.D. in 1948 with thesis The polarizability of the meson-charge cloud of a neutron in an external electrostatic field. He was from 1948 to 1949 an Atomic Energy Commission (AEC) Fellow at the Institute for Advanced Study and from 1949 to 1951 an AEC Fellow at the Berkeley Radiation Laboratory. He was from 1951 to 1954 an assistant professor of physics at Indiana University and from 1954 to 1957 an associate professor of physics at the University of Wisconsin, Madison. In 1953 he was elected a fellow of the American Physical Society. From 1957 to 1981 he was a staff member of Lawrence Berkeley National Laboratory, as well as a professor of physics at the University of California, Berkeley. In 1974 he was elected a member of the National Academy of Sciences. From 1981 to 1991 he was the director of the Marine Physical Laboratory, Scripps Institute of Oceanography, as well as a professor of physical oceanography at the University of California, San Diego. In 1991 he retired as professor emeritus. His doctoral students include Shang-keng Ma.

Watson was an advisor to various United States organizations associated with the United States Department of Defense. In 1959 he worked with Marvin L. Goldberger, Keith Brueckner, and Murray Gell-Mann to join John A. Wheeler, Charles H. Townes, and others in forming the JASON group of government advisors. Watson remained in JASON until 1998. In 1971 he, with four others, formed the company Physical Dynamics, Inc. and then remained on the board of directors until 1981.

Watson did research in the early 1950s on nuclear and pi meson physics, as well as quantum mechanical collision processes, and in the late 1950s on plasma physics and controlled nuclear fusion. A renowned result published during his Indiana period is Watson's final-state-interactions theorem published in Phys.Rev. 88 (1952) 1163-1171, which can be broadly understood as stating that composite states of strongly interacting "particles" will appear in /affect any reaction in which the said "particles" are produced in the correct energy range, independently of the mechanism by which they are produced.

To quote Watson:

In the mid-1960s I began a series of investigations, in collaboration with M. L. Goldberger of the observation of “entangled” quantum mechanical systems. We were concerned with sequential measurements and interference effects for correlated systems.

Watson did research in the early 1970s on atomic and molecular scattering and in the late 1970s on fluid mechanics related to oceanography. He worked in the early 1980s on applying methods of statistical mechanics to internal wave turbulence and in the early 1990s on analyzing the coupling of surface and internal gravity waves.

To quote Watson:

In the mid 1990s my interest in nonlinear classical mechanics and ocean surface waves led to a study of capillary waves (few centimeter wavelengths) interacting with longer waves (10 cm to a meter wavelengths).

Ocean surface wave dynamics can be formulated as nonlinear interactions among a set of harmonic oscillators. The Hamiltonian formulation of this is mathematically very similar to the equations of classical and quantum mechanical field theory that I had encountered at the beginning of my career. I developed a canonical transformation technique which greatly simplified numerical integration of the equations. Calculations of the “long wave effect” agreed with observations of the radar scattering.

== Personal life and death ==
Watson married in 1946 and had two sons. His father was Louis Erwin Watson (1884–1957) and his mother was Irene Marshall Watson (born 1886 in Roanoke, Illinois).

Kenneth M. Watson died in San Diego, California on August 18, 2023, at the age of 101.

== Selected publications ==
- with M. L. Goldberger: Collision Theory. Wiley. 1964. 2004 Dover reprint of corrected 2nd edition, Robert E. Krieger Publishing Company, 1975
- with John W. Bond Jr. and Jasper A. Welch: Atomic Theory of Gas Dynamics. Addison-Wesley. 1965.
- with John Nuttall and John Stephen Roy Chisholm: Topics in Several Particle Dynamics. Holden-Day. 1967.
- with Roger F. Dashen, Walter H. Munk, and Fredrik Zachariasen: Sound Transmission Through a Fluctuating Ocean. Cambridge University Press. 1979. 2010 pbk reprint
