= Ta-Pei Cheng =

Theoretical physicist (born 1941)

Ta-Pei Cheng (Chinese: 鄭大培; born 1941) is a theoretical physicist and professor emeritus of physics at the University of Missouri–St. Louis. Cheng’s research has included work on low-energy theorem relating the nucleon sigma term to the pion-nucleon scattering amplitude at the Cheng–Dashen point, and studies with Estia Eichten and Ling-Fong Li of asymptotic freedom and spontaneous symmetry breaking in gauge theories. He was elected a Fellow of the American Physical Society in 1982.

Cheng has authored several textbooks on gauge theory, general relativity, cosmology, and Einstein’s physics. His textbooks have been used in university courses in particle physics, quantum field theory, relativity, and cosmology; Gauge Theory of Elementary Particle Physics, co-authored with Ling-Fong Li, has been described by Oxford University Press as a well-established textbook in the field.

== Early life and education ==
Cheng was born in Shanghai in 1941 and spent part of his childhood in Qingdao. In 1956, during the Hundred Flowers period, he moved to Hong Kong to join his parents. After completing secondary school in Hong Kong, he moved to the United States to study at Dartmouth College, where he received an A.B. degree in 1964. He then pursued graduate study in theoretical physics at Rockefeller University in New York City, working under the particle physicist and Einstein biographer Abraham Pais and completing his Ph.D. in 1969.

== Academic career ==
Cheng was a postdoctoral member of the Institute for Advanced Study (IAS) in Princeton, New Jersey. He then returned to Rockefeller University as a research associate from 1971 to 1973.

In 1973 Cheng joined the faculty of the University of Missouri–St. Louis (UMSL) as an assistant professor of physics. He was promoted to associate professor in 1976 and to full professor in 1978. He served as chair of the Department of Physics at UMSL from 1978 to 1979. He retired from full-time teaching in 2007 and was named professor emeritus.

Cheng held visiting positions from 1977–1978 at the Institute for Advanced Study, from 1979–1980 at the University of Minnesota, from 1982–1983 at Lawrence Berkeley Laboratory, from 1987–1988 at IAS, and from 1991–1992 at the Chinese University of Hong Kong. He also made extended research visits to the Stanford Linear Accelerator Center, CERN, Fermilab, and the Aspen Center for Physics. From 2002 to 2008, Cheng was an honorary professor of physics at the University of Hong Kong. Beginning in 2009, he also served as an adjunct professor of physics at Portland State University.

== Research ==
Cheng’s research has focused on theoretical particle physics, including gauge theories and the quark structure of the nucleon. Early in his career, Cheng studied low-energy theorems and chiral symmetry. With Roger Dashen, he derived a relation connecting the low-energy pion–nucleon scattering amplitude at what became known as the Cheng–Dashen point to the nucleon sigma term.

He undertook a systematic study, with Eichten and Li, of the renormalization group structure of gauge theories with Higgs fields. Cheng, Eichten, and Li found that, in the classes of gauge theories they examined, asymptotic freedom could not coexist with complete breaking of the gauge symmetry through the Higgs mechanism. The work was cited by Georgi and Glashow in their 1974 paper proposing SU(5) grand unification. Cheng and Li also worked on neutrino masses and related lepton-flavor nonconservation effects.

A 2021 Stanford University bibliometric analysis ranked Cheng among the top 2% of researchers in his field for career-long citation impact. As of August 2026, Google Scholar listed more than 10,000 citations to Cheng's publications. In 1982, Cheng was elected a Fellow of the American Physical Society.

== Textbooks and popular works ==
Cheng is the co-author, with Ling-Fong Li, of Gauge Theory of Elementary Particle Physics, a graduate-level text on gauge field theories and the Standard Model published by Oxford University Press. The book has remained in use as a graduate-level reference in particle physics and quantum field theory, and Oxford University Press later described it as a well-established textbook in the field.

He later turned his attention to general relativity and cosmology, authoring Relativity, Gravitation and Cosmology: A Basic Introduction, published in the Oxford Master Series in Physics. The book appeared in a second edition in 2010 and was reviewed in journals including the American Journal of Physics and General Relativity and Gravitation.

Cheng has also written Einstein’s Physics: Atoms, Quanta, and Relativity — Derived, Explained, and Appraised, which presents Einstein’s contributions to physics in a historical and conceptual framework for advanced undergraduates and general readers with a physics background. He later wrote A College Course on Relativity and Cosmology, intended for upper-level undergraduate students in physics and astronomy.

== Personal life ==
He is married to Leslie Su Cheng and has three children.
