= JASON (advisory group) =

American science and technology advisory group

JASON is an independent group of scientists who advise the United States government on matters of science and technology, mostly of a sensitive nature. The group was created in the aftermath of the Sputnik launch as a way to reinvigorate the idea of having the nation's preeminent scientists help the government with defense problems, similar to the way that scientists helped in World War II but with a new and younger generation. It was established in 1960, and has somewhere between 30 and 60 members. Its work first gained public notoriety as the source of the Vietnam War's McNamara Line electronic barrier. Although most of its research is military-focused, JASON also produced early work on the science of global warming and acid rain. Current unclassified research interests include health informatics, cyberwarfare, and renewable energy.

== Activities ==
For administrative purposes, JASON's activities are run through the MITRE Corporation, a not-for-profit corporation in McLean, Virginia, which operates Federally Funded Research and Development Centers (FFRDCs) for the federal government. The Department of Defense ended its contract with MITRE in April 2019, effectively cutting ties with JASON. However, due to the efforts of the Department of Energy as well as others within the government, to include an act of Congress, the contract was reinstated and is now again with the Department of Defense.

JASON typically performs most of its work during an annual summer study. Its sponsors include the Department of Defense, the Department of Energy, and the U.S. Intelligence Community. Most of the resulting JASON reports are classified.

The name "JASON" is sometimes explained as an acronym, standing either for "July August September October November", the months in which the group would typically meet; or, tongue in cheek, for "Junior Achiever, Somewhat Older Now". However, neither explanation is correct; in fact, the name is not an acronym at all. Mildred Goldberger, wife of group member Murph Goldberger, disliked the name given by the Pentagon, Project Sunrise, and suggested the group be named Jason, inspired by the mythological character Jason. JASON studies have included a now-mothballed system for communicating with submarines using extremely long radio waves (Project Seafarer, Project Sanguine), an astronomical technique for overcoming the atmosphere's distortion (adaptive optics), the many problems of missile defense, technologies for verifying compliance with treaties banning nuclear tests, a 1979 report describing CO_{2}-driven global warming, and the McNamara Line's electronic barrier, a system of computer-linked sensors developed during the Vietnam War which became the precursor to the modern electronic battlefield.

Among the more recent activities was a non-consensus-commensurate (in other words, providing a view alternative to the prevailing one in the federal executive department which commissioned the report), and now declassified, report to the State Department dismissing sounds associated with the Havana syndrome cases as caused by crickets as opposed to microwave weapons. This was followed by a 2021 report, in which JASON again found no compelling evidence that the anomalous health incidents were caused by a deliberate attack using a radio-frequency or any other directed energy weapon.

== Membership ==
JASON members, known informally as "Jasons," include physicists, biologists, chemists, oceanographers, mathematicians, and computer scientists, predominated by theoretical physicists. They are selected by current members, and, over the years, have included eleven Nobel Prize laureates and several dozen members of the United States National Academy of Sciences. Claire Ellen Max was the first female scientist invited to join in 1983. All members have a wide range of security clearances that allow them to do their work.

The founders of JASON include John Wheeler and Charles H. Townes. Other early members included Murray Gell-Mann, S. Courtenay Wright, Robert Gomer, Walter Munk, Hans Bethe, Nick Christofilos, Fredrik Zachariasen, Marshall Rosenbluth, Ed Frieman, Hal Lewis, Sam Treiman, Conrad Longmire, Steven Weinberg, Roger Dashen, and Freeman Dyson.

Some Nobel Prize-winning members of JASON include Donald Glaser, Val Fitch, Murray Gell-Mann, Luis Walter Alvarez, Henry Way Kendall, and Steven Weinberg.

== Chairs ==
In chronological order:

- Marvin Leonard Goldberger (1960–1966)
- Harold Lewis (1966–1973)
- Kenneth M. Watson
- Edward A. Frieman
- Richard Garwin
- William Nierenberg
- William Happer (1987–1990)
- Curtis Callan (1990–1995)
- William H. Press (1995–1998)
- Steven Koonin
- Roy Schwitters (2005–2011)
- Gerald Joyce (2011–2014)
- Russell J. Hemley (2014–2019)
- Ellen D. Williams (2019–present)

== Early history ==
In 1958, a military-issues physics summer study program named Project 137 was launched by physicists John Archibald Wheeler, Eugene Wigner, and Oskar Morgenstern. Participants included Murph Goldberger, Kenneth M. Watson, Nick Christofilos, and Keith Brueckner.

Out of that program came the idea of a permanent institution for advanced scientific research, a proposed National Defense Institute, on behalf of the Department of Defense. Wheeler was offered such a position by DARPA's Herb York but turned it down, having put in the effort to establish Project 137. Murph Goldberger also turned down the request.

However, in December 1959 Marvin Stern, Charles H. Townes, Keith Brueckner, Kenneth M. Watson, and Marvin Leonard Goldberger met in Los Alamos where several of them had been working on nuclear-rocket research and launched JASON as an ongoing summer study program, with financial and administrative support supplied by the Institute for Defense Analyses. In the early 1960s, JASON had about 20 members. By the end of the decade it had grown to over 40 members, with close ties to the President's Science Advisory Committee. In the early 1970s, the backing institution for JASON was changed from IDA to SRI.

== Vietnam War ==
The Vietnam War had a significant effect on JASON's membership and research focus. A major initiative of JASON became the McNamara Line electronic barrier, promoted by the hawks. (According to Freeman Dyson, a member of JASON, this research was actually not carried out by JASON, but by a group called JASON EAST). By around 1966, the team had become strongly divided along political and ethical lines. In March 1967, Freeman Dyson, Robert Gomer, Steven Weinberg, and S. Courtenay Wright produced a report, approved by Secretary of Defense Robert McNamara and titled "Tactical Nuclear Weapons in Southeast Asia." Declassified in 2002 through a Freedom of Information Act action brought by the Nautilus Institute, the paper predicted catastrophic consequences for U.S. global interests as well as for the people and environment of Southeast Asia of a tactical nuclear weapons strike in the area. Going into great detail, the paper strongly contradicted game-scenario research from the RAND Corporation and other groups that was optimistic about a nuclear option. Co-author Wright later stated that the report's main finding was that "employment of nuclear weapons by the US would be of little use against a widely distributed opponent but disaster if copied by the opponent." In a nuclear counterstrike against U.S. troops, the report concluded that, in the worst-case, "the U.S. fighting capability in Vietnam would be essentially annihilated." Co-author Weinberg showed the political point of view of the writers and the increasing political division:

I have to admit that its conclusions were pretty much what we expected from the beginning, and if I had not expected to reach these conclusions then, for the ethical reasons that we left out of the report I would not have helped to write it.

Seymour Deitchman, a national security consultant who served with the IDA for over 28 years, said, "To the extent of my personal knowledge, the talk of using nuclear weapons in that war stopped after the JASON report on the subject." Gordon J. F. MacDonald, executive vice president of IDA at the time, reflected on the JASON report in 1998. MacDonald said that the "grim picture" painted in the report had a major effect on both Johnson and McNamara. It was central to McNamara's differences with the Joint Chiefs of Staff, who were sanguine about the nuclear option; this ultimately led to McNamara's resignation. RAND experts also conceded the report's credibility.

There arose internal conflict between hawkish JASON members such as William Happer, Edward Teller, and William Nierenberg and others such as MacDonald, Sid Drell, and Richard Garwin. Public attention to JASON's involvement in the Vietnam War led to public criticism and attacks, even against JASON members who were not hawks; for example, MacDonald's garage was burned down and Richard Garwin was called a "baby killer."

Around this time, some members critical of the war left, and others directed JASON research into unclassified, non-military work on behalf of the U.S. Department of Energy on problems like global warming and acid rain.

== Recent history ==
In 2002, DARPA decided to cut its ties with JASON. DARPA had not only been one of JASON's primary sponsors, it was also the channel through which JASON received funding from other sponsors. DARPA's decision came after JASON's refusal to allow DARPA to select three new JASON members. Since JASON's inception, new members have always been selected by its existing members. After much negotiation and letter-writing—including a letter by Congressman Rush Holt of New Jersey—funding was subsequently secured from an office higher in the defense hierarchy, the office of the Director, Defense Research & Engineering, name changed to Assistant Secretary of Defense (Research & Engineering) (ASD (R&E)) in 2011.

In 2009, JASON issued its classified recommendations on the future of the United States nuclear arsenal, finding that a new generation of nuclear weapons was unnecessary. In 2010, JASON issued recommendations for the Department of Defense to support cyber-security research. In 2011, the panel published a public analysis of and recommendations for international greenhouse gas monitoring by the United States government. In 2014, the panel published results of its 2013 summer-study focus on health information exchange.

In April 2019, JASON lost its contract with the Department of Defense. On 28 March, Representative Jim Cooper (D–TN), who chairs the strategic forces subcommittee of the House Armed Services Committee, revealed that the MITRE Corporation, a nonprofit based in McLean, Virginia, that manages the JASON contract, received a letter from the Department of Defense ordering it to close up shop by 30 April. However, on 25 April 2019 the National Nuclear Security Administration in the Department of Energy offered the group an 8-month contract that would continue to employ JASON.

== Research ==
About half of JASON's work is classified, ranging from recommendations on the United States nuclear arsenal and missile defense, to electronic surveillance and cyber-security.

Much of JASON's public work has involved energy and the environment, including Gordon MacDonald's project to model climate change that soon convinced him that fossil-fuel burning would lead to dangerous global warming that would outstrip any industrial cooling effects. For decades, MacDonald was a prominent scientific advocate for action on climate change. Current JASON energy research has included reports on advanced biofuel production and how to reduce the Department of Defense's carbon footprint for strategic and environmental reasons. However, several other members of JASON, including past chairs Nierenberg, Happer, and Koonin, have cast doubt on climate science and policies that would limit the use of fossil fuels.
