= Fredrik Zachariasen =

Theoretical physicist from the USA

- Born: June 14, 1931; Chicago
- Died: December 9, 1999 (aged 68); Pasadena, California
- Education: University of Chicago; Caltech
- Known for: Baker-Ball-Zachariasen (BBZ) gluon propagator equation
- Parents: William Houlder Zachariasen (father); Ragni Durban-Hansen (mother)
- Scientific career
- Fields: theoretical physics
- Workplaces: Caltech
- Doctoral advisor: Robert F. Christy

Fredrik "Fred" Zachariasen (1931–1999) was an American theoretical physicist, known for his collaborative work with Murray Gell-Mann, Sidney Drell, and others.

== Early life and education ==
Fredrik Zachariasen was born in 1931 in Chicago, Illinois. His father was the physicist William Houlder Zachariasen.

Fredrik Zachariasen graduated in 1951 with BS in physics from the University of Chicago and in January 1956 with PhD from Caltech with thesis Photodisintegration of the deuteron. He was a postdoc from 1955 to 1956 at MIT, from 1956 to 1957 at the University of California, Berkeley, and from 1957 to 1958 at Stanford University, where he was an assistant professor from 1958 to 1960.

== Career ==
In 1960 he joined the faculty of Caltech and remained there until he retired in September 1999 as professor emeritus. In 1960 he was a Sloan Research Fellow.

He was a founding member of the JASON Defense Advisory Group, where he worked with Walter Munk on acoustic detection of submarines.

At a memorial service at the Athenaeum January 9, Zachariasen’s colleagues, friends, and family celebrated his life: his work in physics, his wide-ranging interests, his love of travel, of the outdoors, of good conversation, good food and, especially, good wine, and his passion to “solve the world.”

=== Ball-Baker-Zachariasen (BBZ) formulation ===
In a long series of papers and a review article, Baker, Ball, Zachariasen ... and co-workers have postulated a dual form of QCD in the continuum. Their formulation describes a non-Abelian dual superconductor and hence it confines color. They have calculated flux tubes, static quark potentials, temperature dependent effects and many other quantities in the tree approximation.

== Later life and legacy ==
Fredrik Zachariasen's wife Nancy worked as a staff member at the library at the California Institute of Technology. They had two daughters. He died in 1999 in Pasadena, California.

Zachariasen's papers are held in the collection of the California Institute of Technology.

== Selected publications ==
- with Sidney Drell: Electromagnetic structure of nucleons. Oxford University Press. 1961.
- with David Horn: Hadron physics at very high energies. Benjamin. 1973.
- with Roger F. Dashen, Walter H. Munk, and Kenneth M. Watson: Sound Transmission through a Fluctuating Ocean. Cambridge University Press. 1979. ISBN 978-0-521-21940-2. 2010 pbk reprint
