= Harold Lewis =

American physicist (1923–2011)

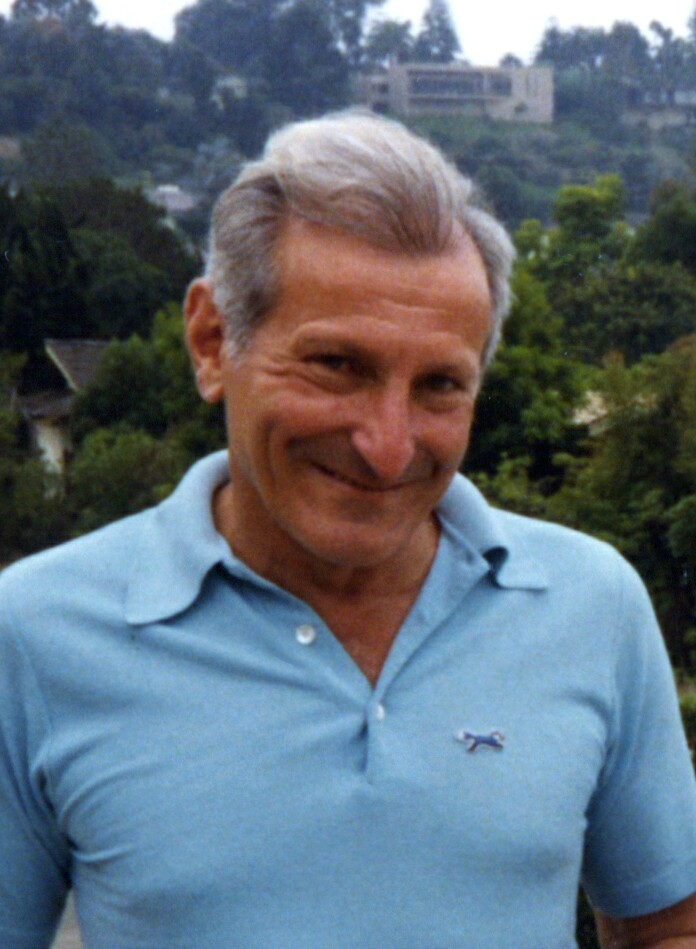
- Lewis in 1980
- Born: Harold Warren Lewis; October 1, 1923; New York City, United States
- Died: May 26, 2011 (aged 87)
- Education: New York University; University of California, Berkeley
- Awards: Science Writing Award (1991)
- Scientific career
- Workplaces: Bell Labs; University of Wisconsin, Madison; University of California, Santa Barbara
- Academic advisors: J. Robert Oppenheimer

Harold ("Hal") Warren Lewis (born October 1, 1923 – May 26, 2011) was an American Emeritus Professor of Physics and former department chairman at the University of California, Santa Barbara (UCSB). He was chairman of the JASON Defense Advisory Group from 1966 to 1973, and was active in US government investigations into safety of nuclear reactors.

In his 1990 book Technological Risk he warned of the risks of global warming. In 2010, after 67 years of membership, he resigned from the American Physical Society, citing what he saw as "the global warming scam, with the (literally) trillions of dollars driving it”.

== Career as a physicist ==
Lewis entered New York University in 1940 and graduated in physics. He earned a master's degree from the University of California, Berkeley, from 1943 to 1944 before joining the Navy, where he served in World War II as an electronics technician. After the war, he returned to the University of California, Berkeley, and earned his Ph.D. in Physics studying under J. Robert Oppenheimer. His focus was high-energy physics (cosmic rays and elementary particles). He, along with the other theoretical physics professors at Berkeley, refused to sign the McCarthy era loyalty oath on principle, and in 1950 went to Princeton. Later, when offered reinstatement at Berkeley, he chose instead to accept a position at Bell Labs, where he did research on superconducting materials. In 1956, he left Bell Labs to join the University of Wisconsin, Madison to work on solid-state physics and plasmas. In 1964, he left to join the University of California, Santa Barbara as a full professor, and later chairman, in their growing physics department. He retired from UCSB in 1991.

He wrote a text on the trade-offs between technological advances and risks, and also authored a popular book on decision-making. In 1991, Harold Lewis won. the Science Writing Award for his book 'Technological Risk'.

Lewis was chairman of the JASON Defense Advisory Group from 1966 to 1973, when he worked on the issue of missile defense. He was a long-term member of the Defense Science Board (DSB), and chaired a 1985 DSB Task Force (with Stephen Schneider) on nuclear winter. Lewis was active in the field of safety of nuclear power plants. In 1975, he chaired a year-long study of light-water reactor safety for the American Physical Society (APS). Lewis chaired the 1977-1979 Risk Assessment Review for the US Nuclear Regulatory Commission.

== Views on climate change ==
In his 1990 book Technological Risk, Lewis wrote that "all models agree that the net effect" of increasing greenhouse gases "will be a general and global warming of the earth; they only disagree about how much. None suggest that it will be a minor effect, to be ignored while we go about our business." Reducing the effects, including significant sea level rise, would "require global cooperation and sacrifice now, to avert something far in the future, and a conjectural something at that. There is no evidence in human history that is in the cards, but one can always hope."

In a letter dated 6 October 2010, Lewis wrote to Curtis Callan, President of the American Physical Society (APS), resigning from the society. Lewis said that he had joined the APS 67 years previously, when it was "as yet uncorrupted by the money flood" which he said had "become the raison d’être of much physics research, the vital sustenance of much more, and it provides the support for untold numbers of professional jobs." In his view, it was "the global warming scam, with the (literally) trillions of dollars driving it, that has corrupted so many scientists, and has carried APS before it like a rogue wave. It is the greatest and most successful pseudoscientific fraud I have seen in my long life as a physicist." This letter of resignation was made public, and "Lewis was vaulted to celebrity status by conservative and contrarian Web sites and commentators". On 12 October, the climate change denialist think-tank The Global Warming Policy Foundation announced that Lewis had agreed to join their "Academic Advisory Council".

On 12 October, 2010, the APS issued a statement that there was no truth in Lewis's accusations; it pointed out that the vast majority of its membership works in areas not dealing with climate change, and its policy statements were developed in accordance with strict ethical standards. The APS completely rejected Lewis's claims of "scam" and "fraud", stating that virtually all reputable scientists were agreed on observations of human caused global warming. In a personal reply, Callan criticized Lewis's disrespectful allegations about colleagues. Responding to complaints Lewis raised alleging rejection of a petition for a Topical Group on Climate Science, Callan said the proposal had been accepted and was being implemented, but unfortunately Lewis had decided to resign rather than participate.

== Personal ==
His father was a textile salesman who immigrated from Russia; his mother was born in the United States. He had two older brothers. He met his future wife Mary at UC Berkeley. They had two children, and later moved to Santa Barbara, California, in 1964.

== Selected books ==
- Technological Risk. W.W.Norton. 1990. p. 368. ISBN 978-0-393-02883-6.
- Why Flip a Coin: The Art and Science of Good Decisions. Wiley. 1997. pp. 224. ISBN 978-0-471-16597-2.
