= Mildred Ginsberg Goldberger =

American mathematician and economist

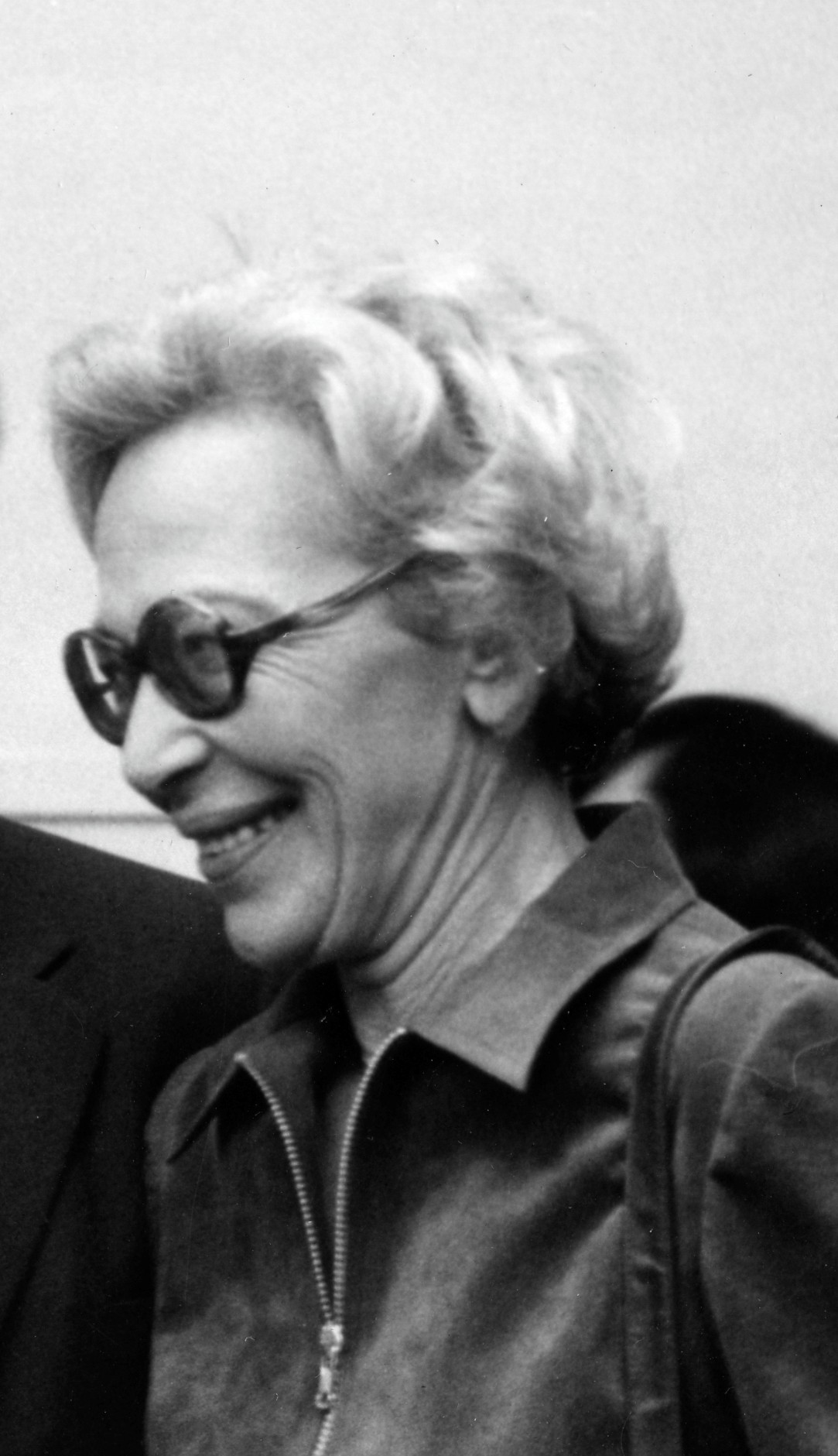
- Mildred Goldberger, ca. 1978
- Born: Mildred Ginsberg; March 23, 1923; Wichita Falls, Texas
- Died: September 11, 2006 (aged 83); La Jolla, California
- Spouse: Marvin Leonard Goldberger
- Scientific career
- Fields: Mathematics Economics

Mildred Ginsberg Goldberger (23 March 1923 – 11 September 2006) was an American mathematician and economist.

== Early life and education ==
Mildred Ginsberg was born in Wichita Falls, Texas, on March 23, 1923. She received her B.A. in mathematics from the University of Illinois, Urbana-Champaign, in 1943. After graduation, she continued her education, taking graduate courses in math, physics, and economics at the University of Chicago.

== Career ==
During WWII, Goldberger served as a research assistant and computer for the theoretical physics division of the Manhattan Project at the Metallurgical Laboratory at the University of Chicago. She was one of ten women to sign the Szilard Petition against the use of a nuclear bomb on Japan.

After WWII, Goldberger held a variety of posts, including chief of the computation group for the University of Chicago Air Force Project, course manager for the Princeton University Math Department, economics instructor at Rutgers University, research analyst with the New Jersey Department of Higher Education, and research associate with the Princeton Center for Environmental and Energy Studies.

Goldberger served as the editor for "Scientific View," the Los Angeles Times' science column, and ensured that contributions from women scientists and science writers were published regularly.

Goldberger became First Lady of CalTech when her husband, Marvin "Murph" Goldberger, was appointed president in 1978. They stayed at the university until 1987. While there, she started a program with the CalTech Women's Club to act as "grandmothers" to foster children in the welfare system in their community.

== Personal life ==
Mildred Ginsberg married physicist Marvin Goldberger, whom she met while working on the Manhattan Project. She died in La Jolla, California, on September 11, 2006.
