= Sam Treiman =

American physicist (1925–1999)

- Born: Sam Bard Treiman; May 27, 1925; Chicago, Illinois, U.S.
- Died: November 30, 1999 (aged 74); New York City, New York, U.S.
- Education: Northwestern University; University of Chicago
- Known for: Goldberger–Treiman relation Callan–Treiman relation Coining the term "Standard Model"
- Awards: Oersted Medal (1985)
- Scientific career
- Fields: Physics
- Workplaces: Princeton University
- Doctoral advisor: Enrico Fermi; John Alexander Simpson
- Doctoral students: Stephen L. Adler; Curtis Callan; Herbert H. Chen; Glennys Farrar; Paul B. Kantor; Young Suh Kim; Stephen Schutz; Bennie Ward; Steven Weinberg

Sam Bard Treiman (/ˈtriːmən/; May 27, 1925 – November 30, 1999) was an American theoretical physicist who produced research in the fields of cosmic rays, quantum physics, plasma physics, and gravity physics. He made contributions to the understanding of the weak interaction and he and his students are credited with developing the Standard Model of elementary particle physics. He was a Higgins professor of physics at Princeton University, a member of the National Academy of Sciences and member of the JASON Defense Advisory Group. He was a student of Enrico Fermi and John Alexander Simpson Jr. Treiman published articles on quantum mechanics, plasmas, gravitation, condensed matter and the history of physics.

== Background ==
Treiman's parents, Abraham and Sarah, were Jewish immigrants from Eastern Europe who immigrated to Chicago, where he was born on May 27, 1925. Sam had a brother, Oscar, who was six years older. Sam was educated in the Chicago public school system and, after graduating high school in 1942, he entered Northwestern University, electing to study chemical engineering. After two years at Northwestern he joined the navy, training as a radar repair technician and he spent the last year of the war as a petty officer in the Philippines, doing, in his words, "a prodigious amount of reading in the peaceful jungles - novels and science". After the war he went to the University of Chicago, receiving a B.S. (1949) and M.S. (1950), having changed his major to physics. He received an Atomic Energy Commission predoctoral fellowship and in 1952 he was granted a PhD by the University of Chicago. His doctoral thesis dealt with the physics of cosmic rays, and the work was done under the supervision of John Alexander Simpson. While at the university, Treiman met his wife, Joan Little, an educational psychologist. They had three children, including Rebecca.

Treiman began teaching at Princeton in 1952 as an instructor. He spent his entire career at Princeton - associate professor (1958–1963), professor (1963–1977) and Eugene Higgins Professor of Physics (1977–1998). He served as chair of the physics department (1981–1987) and chair of the University Research Board (1988–1995). Probably his best-known student at Princeton was Steven Weinberg, recipient of the Nobel Prize in Physics in 1979. Other well-known students are Curtis Callan (1964), and Stephen L. Adler (1964).

Treiman also made contributions to physics outside his professional role at Princeton. Beginning in the early 1960s, with the inception of the JASON Defense Advisory Group, he was a U.S. government advisor in the fields of plasma physics, physics education and strategic planning. (Although Treiman parted ways with Jason in the late 1960s, he rejoined them in 1979.)

In 1970, when Fermilab was set up, its founder Robert R. Wilson asked Treiman if he would direct the theory group. Treiman, who did not want to leave Princeton, was able to help get the group started by taking several extended leaves of absence.

Treiman and his wife Joan were active members of CUSPEA - a program set up by T.D. Lee to help mainland Chinese students get access to graduate education in the U.S. In 1981, 1982 and 1988, they traveled to China to interview prospective students for the program.

A feature of Treiman's work was his ability to devise simple, unambiguous experimental tests for theoretical predictions and phenomena. In addition to his own work, Treiman was widely recognized as a teacher and mentor, supervising more than two dozen graduate students over three decades. His Socratic teaching style enabled his students to gain valuable insights without having been spoon fed the results. He was known for his general wisdom as well as his expertise. One of his more paradoxical sayings is known as Treiman's theorem: "Impossible things usually don't happen."

He was elected a Fellow of the American Physical Society in 1963, and a member of the U. S. National Academy of Sciences in 1972. Treiman was awarded the Oersted medal by the American Association of Physics Teachers in 1995. He was also a member of the American Academy of Arts and Sciences and the American Philosophical Society.

Treiman died of leukemia at Memorial Sloan Kettering Cancer Center on November 30, 1999.

== Major scientific achievements ==
- 1957 (with J. David Jackson and Henry Wyld) - definitive theory of allowed beta decays, taking into account time and parity violations
- 1958 (with Marvin Goldberger) dispersion relations analysis of pion and nucleon beta decay, culminating in the Goldberger-Treiman relationship for the charged pion decay amplitude. This work eventually led to the hypothesis of the partially conserved axial vector current, known as PCAC and to a deeper understanding of spontaneously broken chiral symmetry of the strong interaction.
- 1962 (with C.N. Yang) Treiman-Yang angle test for single pion exchange dominance
- 1966 (with Curtis Callan) derivation of the Callan–Treiman relations for K meson decay.
- 1971 (with David Gross) scaling in vector gluon exchange theories, coining the term twist for the difference between the dimension and spin of an operator.
- 1972 (with Abraham Pais) deriving the implications of weak neutral currents for inclusive neutrino reactions.

== Publications ==
- Sam Treiman's publication records in SPIRES
- Treiman, Sam B. (1999). The Odd Quantum. Princeton, NJ: Princeton University Press. ISBN 0-691-00926-0.
- Photonics: Managing Competitiveness in the Information Era, Commission on Physical Sciences, Mathematics and Applications, Vice Chairman S. Treiman, Board on Physics and Astronomy, National Academy of Sciences (1988)
