= Vijay Balasubramanian =

Indian physicist

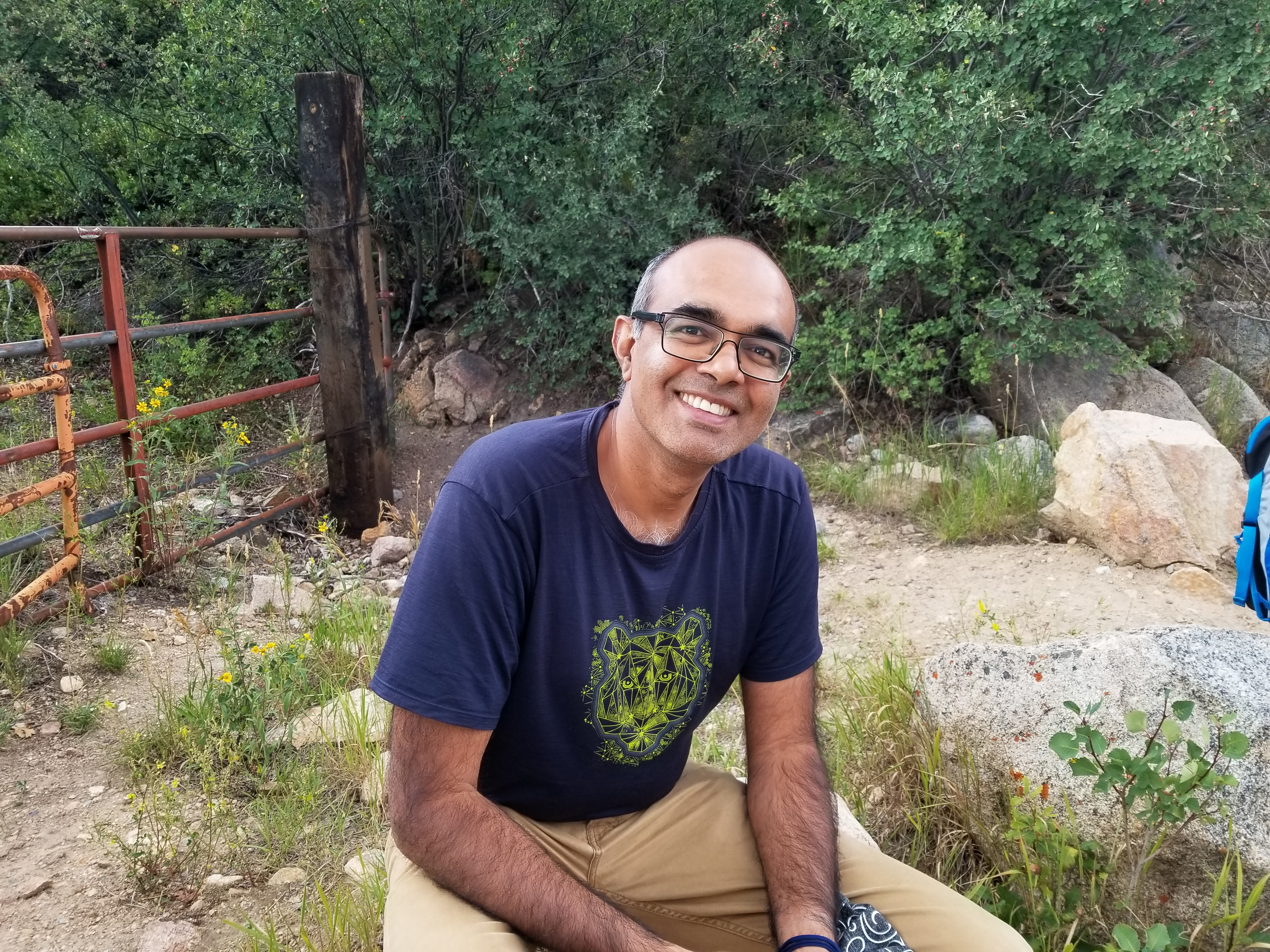
- Born: 1969 (age 56–57); Bombay (Mumbai), India
- Education: Massachusetts Institute of Technology (B.S. Physics and Computer Science, M.S. Computer Science); Princeton University (Ph.D., Physics)
- Known for: String Theory: AdS/CFT Correspondence, Large Volume Compactifications, Black Hole Information Paradox, Quantum Information. Biophysics: Energy Efficient Computation, Efficient Coding and Sensory Circuits in the Brain, Theory of Retinal Circuits, Theory of Spatial Cognition, Adaptive Molecular Sensing (Olfaction and Immune System). Inference and Learning: Occam's Razor in Statistical Inference, Complexity in Decision Making.
- Scientific career
- Fields: String Theory, Quantum Field Theory, Biophysics (Theoretical Neuroscience), Statistical Inference, Machine Learning
- Workplaces: University of Pennsylvania; Aspen Center for Physics; Santa Fe Institute; Vrije Universiteit Brussel; University of Oxford
- Doctoral advisor: Curtis Callan

Vijay Balasubramanian (born 1969) is an American theoretical physicist and the Cathy and Marc Lasry Professor of Physics and Astronomy at the University of Pennsylvania. He has conducted research in string theory, quantum field theory, and biophysics (especially theoretical and computational neuroscience). He has also worked on problems in statistical inference and machine learning. In 2024-25, Balasubramanian held the Eastman Professorship at Balliol College, University of Oxford, which is offered to one American scholar of distinction each year.

== Biography ==
Born in Mumbai, Balasubramanian spent his childhood in major Indian cities including New Delhi, Chennai, Kolkata, and Hyderabad. Among the elementary schools he attended are St. Mary's in Mumbai, St. Xavier’s in Kolkata, and St. Columba’s in New Delhi. His family later moved to Jakarta, Indonesia, where he attended Jakarta International School (JIS). After graduating from JIS, he moved to the United States and attended the Massachusetts Institute of Technology (MIT), where he earned B.S. degrees in Physics and Computer Science and an M.S. degree in Computer Science. While a student at MIT, he worked at CERN (the European Organization for Nuclear Research) and the Xerox Palo Alto Research Center (Xerox PARC). For this work at Xerox PARC, he received two patents in speech recognition.

Vijay Balasubramanian completed his doctoral studies at Princeton University, where he received a Ph.D. in Physics in 1997 under the supervision of Curtis Callan. He then moved to Harvard University as a Junior Fellow of the Harvard Society of Fellows. During this time, he was also a fellow-at-large of the Santa Fe Institute. Since 2000, he has been a professor at the University of Pennsylvania where he currently holds the Cathy and Marc Lasry Chair in Physics and where he has a secondary appointment in the School of Medicine, Department of Neuroscience. In 2013, he co-founded the Computational Neuroscience Initiative at Penn.

In October 2021, he was a featured speaker in the Netflix documentary series Explained, in the episode on "Time." In 2022, Quanta Magazine featured him in an article and video in which he discussed connections between physics, computer science, neurosciences, and humanities fields such as literature. Quanta described him as a "polymath who is prone to leaping from string theory to Proust in mid-conversation." In 2023, the Catalan-language daily newspaper of Barcelona, Ara, featured him in an article in which he discussed the relative powers and limits of the human brain and of Artificial Intelligence, and what physics can bring to the study of theoretical and computational neuroscience. Balasubramanian also spoke on Aspen Public Radio with physicist Lisa Randall and composers Chris Theofanidis and John Luther Adams on music, science, and creativity.

== Affiliations ==
Vijay Balasubramanian has been a research associate and visiting professor at many institutions. These include Rockefeller University; the City University of New York (CUNY) Graduate Center; the École Normale Supérieure (ENS) in Paris, France; the International Centre for Theoretical Physics (ICTP) in Trieste, Italy; the Vrije Universiteit Brussel (VUB) in Brussels, Belgium; the University of Oxford in the UK; and the International Centre for Theoretical Sciences (ICTS) in Bangalore, India. In 2007–8, he was a fellow at the Institute for Advanced Study (IAS) (Princeton), supported by an IAS grant from Helen and Martin Chooljian. Since 2011, he has been a General Member of the Aspen Center for Physics in Aspen, Colorado. In 2022, he became an External Professor of the Santa Fe Institute.

== Honors ==
Vijay Balasubramanian has won many prizes and fellowships. In 2005, Balasubramanian won first prize in the Gravity Research Foundation essay competition, with his colleagues Don Marolf and Moshe Rozali for an essay on “Information Recovery from Black Holes”. In 2006, he won the Ira H. Abrams Award for Distinguished Teaching – the highest teaching award given by the School of Arts and Sciences at the University of Pennsylvania. In 2012-13 he won a fellowship from the Fondation Pierre-Gilles de Gennes, which he held at the École Normale Supérieure (ENS) in Paris, France. In 2015, Balasubramanian was part of the international team of string theorists, computer scientists, and quantum information theorists that won a major grant from the Simons Foundation in New York to investigate the emergence of the fabric of spacetime from information. Their project was entitled, "It from Qubit: Simons Collaboration on Quantum Fields, Gravity, and Information".

In 2019, the American Physical Society honored Balasubramanian by recognizing him as a Fellow of the society. His citation as a 2019 APS Fellow noted his "fundamental contributions clarifying the black hole information puzzle and black hole thermodynamics through work on the duality of quantum gravity and quantum field theory, and on black hole microscopics in theories of quantum gravity".

In 2024-25, Balasubramanian held the Eastman Professorship at Balliol College, University of Oxford.

== Students and Post-Doctoral Fellows ==
Vijay Balasubramanian's PhD students have included Minxin Huang (University of Science and Technology, China), Bartlomiej (Bartek) Czech (Tsinghua University, Beijing, China), Xue-xin Wei (University of Texas, Austin), Klaus Larjo (Goldman-Sachs), Jason Prentice, Thomas Levi, Kristina Simmons, Charles Ratliff, John Briguglio (Janelia Research Campus, HHMI), Kamesh Krishnamurthy (Zyphra), Alex Keinath (University of Illinois Chicago), Louis Kang (RIKEN Center for Brain Science), Arjun Kar (Google Deepmind), Matthew DeCross (Quantinuum), Cathy Li, Ron Ditullio, David Kersen (Weill Cornell Medicine), and Qingyue Wu (Squarepoint).

He has mentored many postdoctoral fellows including Ann Hermundstad (Janelia Research Campus, HHMI), Gasper Tkacik (Institute of Science and Technology [IST], Austria), Patrick Garrigan (St. Joseph's University), Joan Simon (University of Edinburgh), Monica Guica (Institut de Physique Théoretique, Paris [Saclay]), Tiberiu Tesileanu (Flatiron Institute, New York), Serena Bradde (American Physical Society), Vijay Singh (Villanova University), Asad Naqvi (Goldman-Sachs), Onkar Parrikar (TIFR Mumbai), Gabor Sarosi, Charles Rabideau, Tomonori Ugajin (Kyoto University), Eugenio Piasini (SISSA), Gaia Tavoni (Washington University in St. Louis), Clélia de Mulatier (University of Amsterdam), Hanrong Chen (Genome Institute of Singapore), Philipp Fleig, Menachem (Nachi) Stern (AMOLF, Amsterdam), Mikhail Khramstov (Steklov Institute), Edgar Shaghoulian (University of California, Santa Cruz), Javier Magan (Instituto Balseiro, Argentina; University of Barcelona), Chitraang Murdia, and Monica Kang (Texas A&M).
