= Brian Bornstein =

American academic

- Occupations: Researcher; Educator

Academic background
- Education: University of Pennsylvania (M.A, PhD); University of Nebraska-Lincoln (MLS); Duke University (B.A)

Academic work
- Discipline: Law-Psychology
- Institutions: Arizona State University; University of North Carolina-Chapel Hill

Brian Bornstein is a psychological scientist who focuses on law-psychology, specifically how juries make their decisions and the reliability of eyewitness memory. He is a professor at Arizona State University, Professor Emeritus at the University of Nebraska-Lincoln, and Adjunct Professor at the University of North Carolina-Chapel Hill. Bornstein has published over 200 articles, books, and book chapters.

== Education ==
Bornstein received his B.A in psychology at Duke University in 1985. Afterwards, he spent a year in Munich, Germany where he was a Fulbright scholar. He obtained his M.A. in psychology (1987) and his PhD in psychology (1991) from the University of Pennsylvania. Under the supervision of Jonathan Baron, Bornstein completed his dissertation entitled The Effect of Sympathy on Attributions of Liability: Legal and Bayesian Perspectives. In his dissertation, he studied how sympathy, pertaining to either the plaintiff or defendant, influences a jury's judgment and decision-making. He completed his dissertation with the support of a National Science Foundation grant. Afterward, he continued his education by earning his MLS in Legal Studies from the University of Nebraska-Lincoln in 2001.

== Career and research ==
Bornstein held faculty positions at Bucknell University and Louisiana State University. In 2000, he began working at the University of Nebraska-Lincoln (UNL). From 2015 to 2017, Bornstein was the Director of the Law-Psychology program at UNL and then retired from the university in 2019. UNL named Bornstein Professor Emeritus of Psychology along with Courtesy Professor of Law. He joined as a professor at Arizona State University in 2019 and is also an Adjunct Professor at North Carolina-Chapel Hill in the Department of Psychology and Neuroscience. He is the Program Director for the Law and Social Sciences Program at the National Science Foundation.

Throughout his career, Bornstein has published over 180 articles and contributed to 21 books. He focuses his research on eyewitness memory and on ways that juries make their decisions. Reflective of his research on juries, Bornstein has examined how expert scientific testimony influences jury verdicts. He found there is a profound effect on judgment when the expert testimony is central to a case. Juries were also found to find anecdotal evidence more credible than non-anecdotal evidence. In working with Matthew P. West, Emily F. Wood, and Monica K. Muller, Bornstein examined how immigrant status and ethnicity related to a jury's decision. The researchers found that juries are more likely to make punitive decisions due to a defendant's immigration status and ethnicity.

Bornstein also collaborated with Lesley M. Liebel and Nikki C. Scarberry to understand how repeated testing and negative emotions impact eyewitness memory. They discovered that in witnessing a negative emotional event, individuals recall less information preceding the event but could recall more information from the event itself. Repeated testing can also increase recall for individuals in negative emotional and non-negative emotional events. Thus, Bornstein and his co-researchers suggest that requiring a witness to repeatedly retrieve information from their memory of a crime can prove as beneficial as a witness retrieving neutral information from memory. From this research, Bornstein and his co-researchers brought to light useful means of retrieving information from witnesses.

=== Awards ===
Bornstein and his co-author, Edie Greene, were awarded the American Psychology-Law Society Book Award in 2019 for their book The Jury Under Fire: Myth, Controversy and Reform. This award was renamed the Lawrence S. Wrightsman Book Award the same year. The book examined different myths and beliefs associated with juries and how this may affect jury reform. In one chapter of the book entitled Jurors Can Distinguish Accurate from Inaccurate Eyewitness, Bornstein and Greene explained how many jurors' beliefs are biased however judges believe juries can determine the difference between accurate and inaccurate eyewitness testimonies. Also by the American Psychology-Law Society, he received the Outstanding Teaching and Mentoring Award in 2011.

=== Editorial work ===
With Monica Miller, Bornstein edited Advances in Psychology & Law which currently has 5 volumes as of 2024. This series makes the connections between psychology and law through many different studies produced by researchers. Bornstein served as an editor for Beliefs and Expectancies in Legal Decision Making with Bradley D. McAuliff. This editorial work looks at many different studies that examine the beliefs and expectancies that are associated with the legal system. Additionally, Bornstein worked on with Richard Wiener editing Emotion and the Law: Psychology Perspectives. This series consists of the work of researchers who evaluated the interaction of emotion and affective states with patterns of conduct in the legal system.

== Books ==
- Bornstein, B. H. & Neuschatz, J. (2019). Hugo Münsterberg's Psychology and Law: A Historical and Contemporary Assessment. Oxford University Press.
- Bornstein, B. H. (2017). Popular Myths about Memory: Media Representations versus Scientific Evidence. Lexington Books.
- Bornstein, B. H. & Greene, E. (2017). The Jury Under Fire: Myth, Controversy, and Reform. Oxford University Press.
