= Paul B. Kantor =

Paul B. Kantor is an American information scientist. He is Distinguished Professor Emeritus of Information Science at Rutgers University in New Jersey, and an Honorary Research Associate in Industrial and Systems Engineering at the University of Wisconsin, Madison.

== Biography ==
Kantor was educated in Physics and Mathematics at Columbia University, where he took courses taught by Samuel Eilenberg, Tsung-Dao Lee, Jack Steinberger, Charles Townes, Polykarp Kusch and Melvin Schwartz. He earned a Ph.D. degree in theoretical physics at Princeton University, working with Sam Treiman. He has been a Fulbright Fellow, has received the ASIST Research award, and is a Fellow of the AAAS.

His research centers on the role of information systems for storage and retrieval in a wide range of applications, with particular emphasis on rigorous evaluation of the effectiveness of such systems. Since the 9/11 attacks he has worked in several areas related to Homeland and National Security, dealing with optimal detection of threats and allocation of resources. While this research continues, he is currently investigating the relationships between human and machine learning, as a collaborator in several projects.

At Rutgers he was a member of the Department of Library and Information Science, the Center for Operations Research RUTCOR, the Center for Discrete Mathematics and Computer Sciences DIMACS, served as Research Director for the CCICADA DHS Center, and a member the Graduate Faculty of the Department of Computer Science.

Since 2015 he is Professor Emeritus (Dist.) at Rutgers, and an Honorary Associate of the Department of Industrial and Systems Engineering at the University of Wisconsin, Madison, where he is involved in research addressing the similarities and differences between human learning and machine learning.

Earlier in his career Kantor was a professor of Physics at Case Western Reserve Iniversity University in Cleveland, Ohio.

== Membership ==
- American Society for Information Science and Technology (American Society for Information Science and Technology)
- American Association for the Advancement of Science (AAAS)
- IEEE
- American Physical Society
- American Statistical Association
- SIAM, the Society for Industrial and Applied Mathematics.

== Research grants ==
- NSF
- DARPA
- ARDA
- US Department of Education

== Publications ==
- Kantor, Paul B. Objective performance measures for academic and research libraries / by Paul B. Kantor. Washington, D.C. : Association of Research Libraries, 1984. viii, 76 p., [13] leaves : ill.; 29 cm. ISBN 0-918006-09-0 (pbk.)
- Kantor, Paul B. Studying the cost and value of library services : final report / by Paul B. Kantor, project director and principal investigator, Tefko Saracevic, co-principal investigator, Joann D’Esposito-Wachtmann, project manager. [New Brunswick, N.J.] : Alexandria Project Laboratory, School of Communication, Information, and Library Studies, Rutgers, c1995. 1 v. (various pagings) : ill.; 28 cm.
- Kantor, Paul B. (August 2002). "Mathematical models in information science". Bulletin of the American Society for Information Science & Technology.
- Intelligence and security informatics : IEEE International Conference on Intelligence and Security Informatics, ISI 2005, Atlanta, GA, USA, May 19–20, 2005 : proceedings / Paul Kantor ... [et al.] (eds.). Berlin; New York : Springer, c2005. xviii, 674 p. : ill.; 24 cm. ISBN 3-540-25999-6
- Ying Sun, Paul B Kantor. Cross-Evaluation: A new model for information system evaluation. Journal of the American Society for Information Science and Technology. Hoboken: Mar 2006. Vol. 57, Iss. 5; p. 614
- Yuval Elovici, Bracha Shapira, Paul B Kantor. A Decision Theoretic Approach to Combining Information Filters: An Analytical and Empirical Evaluation. Journal of the American Society for Information Science and Technology. Hoboken: Feb 1, 2006. Vol. 57, Iss. 3; p. 306
- Yuval Elovici, Bracha Shapira, Paul B. Kantor. Using the Information Structure Model to Compare Profile-Based Information Filtering Systems. Information Retrieval. Boston: Jan 2003. Vol. 6, Iss. 1; p. 75.
- Paul B Kantor. Mathematical models in information science. Bulletin of the American Society for Information Science and Technology. Silver Spring: Aug/Sep 2002. Vol. 28, Iss. 6; p. 22
- Bracha Shapira, Paul B Kantor, Benjamin Melamed. The effect of extrinsic motivation on user behavior in a collaborative information finding system. Journal of the American Society for Information Science and Technology. Hoboken: Sep 2001. Vol. 52, Iss. 11; p. 879.
- Strategic Appraisal: The Changing Role of Information Warfare. Paul B Kantor. The Library Quarterly. Chicago: Jul 2001. Vol. 71, Iss. 3; p. 425.
- Kwong Bor Ng, Paul B Kantor. Predicting the effectiveness of naive data fusion on the basis of system characteristics. Journal of the American Society for Information Science. Nov 2000. Vol. 51, Iss. 13; p. 1177.
- Paul B Kantor, Endre Boros, Benjamin Melamed, Vladimir Menkov, et al. Capturing human intelligence in the Net. Association for Computing Machinery. Communications of the ACM. New York: Aug 2000. Vol. 43, Iss. 8; p. 112.
- Paul B. Kantor, Ellen M. Voorhees. The TREC-5 Confusion Track: Comparing Retrieval Methods for Scanned Text. Information Retrieval. Boston: May 2000. Vol. 2, Iss. 2-3; p. 165.
- Kwong Bor Ng, Paul B Kantor. Predicting the effectiveness of naive data fusion on the basis of system characteristics. Journal of the American Society for Information Science. 2000. Vol. 51, Iss. 13; p. 1177
- Willard I Zangwill, Paul B Kantor. Toward a theory of continuous improvement and the learning curve. Management Science. Linthicum: Jul 1998. Vol. 44, Iss. 7; p. 910.
- Paul B Kantor, Jung Jin Lee. Testing the Maximum Entropy Principle for Information Retrieval. Journal of the American Society for Information Science (1986–1998). New York: May 1998. Vol. 49, Iss. 6; p. 557
- Tefko Saracevic, Paul B Kantor. Studying the Value of Library and Information Services. Part II. Methodology and Taxonomy. Journal of the American Society for Information Science (1986–1998). New York: Jun 1997. Vol. 48, Iss. 6; p. 543
- Tefko Saracevic, Paul B Kantor. Studying the Value of Library and Information Services. Part I. Establishing a Theoretical Framework. Journal of the American Society for Information Science (1986–1998). New York: Jun 1997. Vol. 48, Iss. 6; p. 527.
- Studying the Cost and Value of Library and Information Services: Applying Functional Cost Analysis to the Library in Transition
- Eileen G Abels, Paul B Kantor, Tefko Saracevic. Journal of the American Society for Information Science (1986–1998). New York: Mar 1996. Vol. 47, Iss. 3; p. 217.
- Jung Jin Lee, Paul B Kantor. A Study of Probabilistic Information Retrieval Systems in the Case of Inconsistent Expert Judgments. Journal of the American Society for Information Science (1986–1998). New York: Apr 1991. Vol. 42, Iss. 3; p. 166.
- Paul B Kantor. Brief Communication A Model for the Stopping Behavior of Users of Online Systems. Journal of the American Society for Information Science (1986–1998). New York: May 1987. Vol. 38, Iss. 3; p. 211.
- Paul B Kantor. A Note on Cumulative Advantage Distributions. Journal of the American Society for Information Science (pre-1986). New York: Jul 1978. Vol. 29, Iss. 4; p. 202.
- Paul B Kantor. Availability Analysis. Journal of the American Society for Information Science (pre-1986). New York: Sep/Oct 1976. Vol. 27, Iss. 5; p. 311.
