= William Houlder Zachariasen =

Norwegian-American physicist

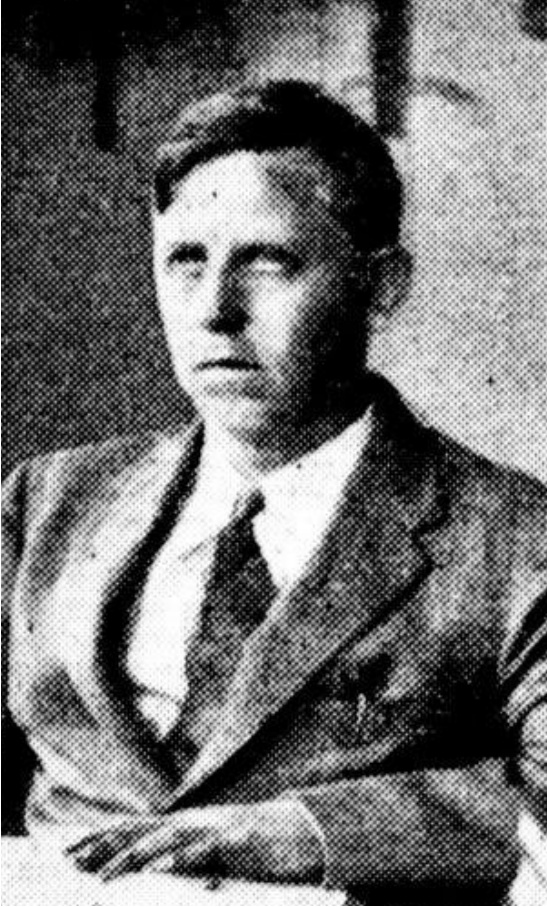
- Born: February 5, 1906; Langesund, Norway
- Died: December 24, 1979 (aged 73)
- Education: University of Oslo
- Children: Fredrik Zachariasen
- Scientific career
- Workplaces: University of Manchester; University of Chicago
- Doctoral advisor: Victor Goldschmidt
- Other academic advisors: Lawrence Bragg

William Houlder Zachariasen (5 February 1906 – 24 December 1979), more often known as W. H. Zachariasen, was a Norwegian-American physicist, specializing in X-ray crystallography and famous for his work on the structure of glass.

== Background ==
Zachariasen was born in the town of Langesund (now part of Bamble Municipality) in Telemark, Norway. He entered the University of Oslo in 1923, where he studied in the Mineralogical Institute. Zachariasen published his first article in 1925 when he was 19 years old, after having presented the contents of the article to the Norwegian Academy of Sciences in the preceding year. Over a span of 55 years he published over 200 scientific papers, many of which he was the sole author. In 1928 at the age of 22 he earned his PhD from the University of Oslo, becoming the youngest person ever to receive a PhD in Norway. His thesis advisor was the geochemist Victor Moritz Goldschmidt. In the years 1928–1929, as a postdoctoral fellow at Manchester University in the laboratory of Lawrence Bragg, Zachariasen began his studies on the physical structure of silicates. His work led to the first real understanding of the structure of glass. He returned to the University of Oslo but, within a year, accepted an offer from the Nobel laureate Arthur Compton.

== Career ==
In 1930 Zachariasen, at the age of 24, became a member of the faculty of physics at the University of Chicago. In 1935–1936 he was a Guggenheim Fellow. In 1941 Zachariasen became an American citizen and then, from 1943 to 1945, worked on the Manhattan Project. In 1945 he published his important monograph Theory of X-ray Diffraction in Crystals. In 1948–1949 he published 29 papers. From 1945 to 1950 and again from 1955 to 1959 Zachariasen was the chair of the physics department at the University of Chicago. In 1963 Zachariasen examined a well-known discrepancy between the calculated and measured intensities of diffraction X-ray beams by making careful measurements of diffraction intensities from a target consisting of the mineral Hambergite. Using his experiment data, he reconsidered the prevailing widely accepted and extensively used theory. In a paper published in 1963, he showed that C. G. Darwin's formula for the secondary extinction correction contained an error in the treatment of the polarization of the X-ray beams. In 1967 Zachariasen published a general theory of X-ray diffraction in crystals that gave more precise estimates for X-diffraction intensities. In 1968 he published a theory that took into account both extinction and the Borrmann effect for X-ray diffraction in mosaic crystals.

== Personal life ==
In 1930, before leaving Norway, Zachariasen married Ragni Durban-Hansen, granddaughter of the geologist W. C. Brøgger. The Zachariasens had two children, Fredrik and Ellen. As a couple, the Zachariasens were close friends with four other couples consisting of four male physicists and their wives. The four physicists were: Samuel Allison, Elmer Dershem (1881–1965), Marcel Schein, and John Harry Williams (1908–1966). Allison, Williams, and Zachariasen took a number of canoeing vacations together, sometimes accompanied by Rudolph "Buddy" Thorness (1909–1969) and perhaps one or two other men. In 1974, Zachariasen retired from the University of Chicago and moved with his wife to Santa Fe, New Mexico, where they purchased the first house they ever owned. He continued to write scientific papers, often working with his friends Finley H. Ellinger and Robert A. Penneman, both from Los Alamos National Laboratory. Zachariasen also worked with Bernd Matthias, a professor at the University of California, San Diego. Zachariasen's son, Fredrik "Zach" Zachariasen (1931–1999), was a theoretical physicist, specializing in the interactions of elementary particles at high energies. Fredrik Zachariasen was a physics professor at Caltech and coauthored two books on high energy physics and another book related to the acoustics of antisubmarine warfare.

== Influence on the science of glass ==
In 1932 W. H. Zachariasen published "The Atomic Arrangement in Glass", a classic article that greatly influenced material scientists of that era. This article perhaps had more influence than any other published work on the science of glass. A glass has an amorphous structure, whereas a crystal has a long-range ordered structure; however, both glasses and crystals have the same building blocks, i.e. polyhedra consisting of cations and anions bound together. The crystallographer Zachariasen is generally credited as the greatest pioneer of the understanding of the structure of glass for his 1932 random network theory of glass. In this theory, the nature of bonding in the glass is the same as in the crystal, but the basic structural units in a glass are connected in a random manner in contrast to the periodic arrangement in a crystalline material. The work of Zachariasen provided a foundation for the development of the understanding of the structure of glass and the structure's relation with its chemical composition. According to Richard L. Lehman of Rutgers University, "Zachariasen considered the relative glass-forming ability of oxides and concluded that the ultimate condition for glass formation is that a substance can form extended three-dimensional networks lacking periodicity but with energy comparable with that of the corresponding crystal networks. From this condition he derived four rules for oxide structure that allow selection of those oxides that tend to form glasses. ... Overall, in spite of Zachariasen's mediocre prediction record, he has received great recognition as being the first to systematically address the relationship between atomic structure and glass forming ability."

Assume that $A$ represents a metal atom, i.e. a cation. The four rules for the formation of a glass from an oxide $A_m O_n$ are:

- An oxygen atom is linked to no more than two glass-forming atoms A.
- The number of oxygen atoms around each glass-forming atom A is small, perhaps 3 or 4.
- Among the oxygen-containing polyhedra, a polyhedron cation A shares corners, but no sides or faces.
- For three-dimensional networks of oxygen-containing polyhedra, at least three corners must be shared.

== Work on 5f elements ==
According to Robert Penneman of Los Alamos National Laboratory, "No other crystallographer has done so much to expand our knowledge of heavy element chemistry, or had a such a central role in the development of atomic energy." During the early stages of the Manhattan Project, only microgram quantities of the transuranium elements were produced. The chemists who did microchemistry on these samples of transuranium elements sent the samples in capillaries to Zachariasen to find out what the samples consisted of. Zachariasen's X-ray diffraction analysis was an essential basis for experimental evidence that the transuranium elements formed a 5f series analogous to the 4f series of the rare-earth elements. His X-ray studies of the transuranium elements were essential for the development of the metallurgy of the transuranium elements, particularly plutonium. In 1948 he published a paper on new structure types for compounds of the 5f series of elements.

== Physics Department at University of Chicago ==
According to Mark Inghram, "Zachariasen had absolutely no use for pretense or titles. His friends and associates always called him by one of his two nicknames, "Willie" or "Zach". Late in 1945 Willie first accepted administrative duties. His influence and effectiveness in these positions has positively affected many lives. In 1928, just two years before Willie went to the University of Chicago, a national survey had ranked the department of physics number one in the country. This was due in large part to the presence at that time of Michelson, Millikan, and Compton, three Nobel Prize winners. During the 1930s, under the guidance of Gale and Compton, that rank slipped badly. This, according to Willie, was due primarily to the autocratic rule within the department, and to the hiring by the department of its own students as junior faculty, largely to assist the faculty member under whom that student had received the Ph.D. degree.

The changes that Willie made were momentous and lasting. He immediately ended the domination of the department by Michelson's grating ruling engines by giving them away, one to Bausch and Lomb, and one to the Massachusetts Institute of Technology. He immediately turned the department from autocratic to democratic. The then tenured faculty met for the first time in many years to consider departmental affairs.

Zachariasen, with the support of the physics department faculty, brought Enrico Fermi, Edward Teller, Robert F. Christy, Walter H. Zinn, Maria Goeppert-Mayer, Gregor Wentzel, and other distinguished physicists to the University of Chicago as professors of physics. By 1949, the department had regained his top ranking. Among those physicists who earned PhDs at the University of Chicago between 1945 and 1950 were five who won Nobel prizes later in their careers.

== See also ==
- Crystal chemistry
- Pauling's rules
- Structure of liquids and glasses
- X-ray crystallography
