= Rebecca Treiman =

American psychologist

- Born: Princeton, New Jersey, U.S.
- Occupation: Psychologist
- Title: Burke and Elizabeth High Baker Professor of Child Developmental Psychology at Washington University in St. Louis
- Parent(s): Sam Treiman; Joan Little Treiman
- Awards: Distinguished Scientific Contribution Award from the Society for the Scientific Study of Reading

Academic background
- Education: Yale University (BA); University of Pennsylvania (PhD)
- Thesis: The phonemic analysis ability of preschool children
- Doctoral advisor: Jonathan Baron
- Other advisor: Alvin Liberman

Rebecca Treiman is an American psychologist. She is professor emeritus and the Burke and Elizabeth High Baker Professor of Child Developmental Psychology of Arts and Sciences at Washington University in St. Louis and head of the Reading and Language Lab there. Treiman's research focuses on spelling and reading, and especially on the linguistic factors that affect these processes.

== Biography ==
Born in Princeton, New Jersey, to Sam Bard Treiman and Joan Little Treiman, Rebecca Treiman received a B.A. in linguistics from Yale University in 1976. Alvin Liberman was her adviser for her senior honors thesis at Yale.

Treiman received a Ph.D. in psychology from the University of Pennsylvania (1980). Jonathan Baron was her adviser for a thesis titled "The phonemic analysis ability of preschool children." She was a faculty member at Indiana University and Wayne State University before moving to Washington University in St. Louis in 2002.

Treiman has written two books on children's spelling, and has published research articles on the processes involved in reading and spelling in children and adults. She has over 200 publications and an h-index of over 85. In addition, Treiman has edited or co-edited several books on spelling and reading.

Treiman was editor in chief of the Journal of Memory and Language from 1997 to 2001. She was awarded the Distinguished Scientific Contribution Award from the Society for the Scientific Study of Reading in 2014.

== Publications ==
- Pollatsek, A., & Treiman, R. (Eds.). (2015). Oxford handbook of reading. New York, NY: Oxford University Press. ISBN 978-0199324576
- Treiman, R., & Kessler, B. (2014). How children learn to write words. New York, NY: Oxford University Press. ISBN 978-0199907977
- Treiman, R. (Ed.). (1997). Spelling. Dordrecht, the Netherlands: Kluwer. ISBN 978-0792349587
- Treiman, R. (1993). Beginning to spell: A study of first-grade children. New York, NY: Oxford University Press. ISBN 978-0195062199
- Gough, P. B., Ehri, L. C., & Treiman, R. (Eds.) (1992). Reading acquisition. Hillsdale, NJ: Erlbaum. (Republished by Routledge in 2018) ISBN 978-0815373612
