= Jonathan Baron =

American psychologist

- Born: 1944 (age 81–82); Boston, Massachusetts, U.S.
- Education: Harvard University (BA); University of Michigan (PhD)
- Scientific career
- Fields: Moral psychology
- Workplaces: University of Pennsylvania (since 1974); McMaster University (1970-1974)
- Thesis: The threshold for successiveness (1970)
- Doctoral students: Jonathan Haidt; Hal Pashler; Brian Bornstein; Rebecca Treiman
- Website: www.sas.upenn.edu/~baron/

Jonathan Baron (born 1944) is an American psychologist. He is a professor emeritus of psychology at the University of Pennsylvania in the science of decision-making.

== Early life and education ==
Baron was born near Boston, Massachusetts, in 1944. He grew up mostly near St Louis Missouri, but then moved back to the Boston area at age 13. He attended Phillips Academy Andover, and graduated from Harvard University with a B.A. in psychology in 1966. As an undergraduate, he worked on discrimination of different physiological substrates of arousal, advised by David Shapiro. He received a Ph.D. from the University of Michigan in 1970, doing a thesis on psychophysics, advised by David H. Krantz.

== Career ==
He was on the faculty of McMaster University from 1970 to 1974. Then moved to the University of Pennsylvania, where his main appointment was in psychology. He had secondary appointments at various times in the Wharton School, the Graduate School of Education, the Leonard Davis Institute, and the Annenberg School for Communication at the University of Pennsylvania.

Baron is the founding editor of the open-access journal Judgment and Decision Making, which he established in 2006 and produced and hosted independently until the end of 2022, when publication moved to Cambridge University Press. Under his editorship, the journal became an early adopter of open science policies in psychology: authors were generally asked to submit sufficient materials to understand what was done in the experiments. From 2011, authors were furthermore encouraged to submit their raw data at the time of review, and the proportion of articles with openly available data subsequently rose sharply. [Nuijten et al., 2017, Collabra: Psychology, 3(1), 31] He has also been on the editorial boards of several other journals, most notably as associate editor of Medical Decision Making (journal) and of the Journal of Economic Psychology.

== Notable contributions ==
Baron has studied a variety of areas in psychology. In the 1970s he studied reading in children and adults. Some of this work was a collaboration with his student Rebecca Treiman on phonemic awareness and its role in phonics. He also worked on other projects in developmental psychology.

He has also contributed to the literature in philosophy over the years, generally arguing for the relevance of utilitarianism in moral philosophy and applied philosophy (e.g., bioethics), following the tradition of R. M. Hare.

Since the mid-1980's, most of Baron's work has occurred within the field of judgment and decision making, a multi-disciplinary area that applies psychology to problems in economics, law, business, and public policy. This field began by contrasting human decision behavior with theories of individual decision-making and judgment, such as probability theory and expected utility. Baron's research has extended the focus of judgment and decision making to social problems of resource allocation and moral decisions. Among the concepts associated with his work are omission bias (the tendency for people to excuse acts of omission more easily than acts of commission) and protected values (principles on which people are unwilling to accept trade-offs).

Other activities were participation in The Good Judgment Project, and studies of value measurement, focusing on the flaws in contingent valuation and how to fix them.

Baron is author of Thinking and Deciding, a text that takes on the task of examining psychological research directed at a comprehension of the nature of thinking as he sees it. In this text, Baron covers such topics as risk, bioethics, Bayes' theorem, utility measurement, decision analysis, and values. The text takes a broad-based, introductory-level view to the field of psychological decision theory.

He has also authored Morality and Rational Choice, Against Bioethics,, Judgment Misguided. and "Effective citizenship: How we can help the world and why we don't".

Additionally, he is the co-editor of Teaching Decision Making to Adolescents (with Rex V. Brown) and Psychological Perspectives on Justice (with Barbara Mellers).

Baron's Ph.D. students have included Rebecca Treiman, Hal Pashler, Brian Bornstein, Kathleen Galotti, Jane Beattie, Jonathan Haidt and Tess Wilkinson-Ryan.

== Personal life ==
Baron is married to Judith Baron, since 1967. They have a son, David Baron (computer scientist), and two grandchildren.
