= Marvin Leonard Goldberger =

American theoretical physicist (1922–2014)

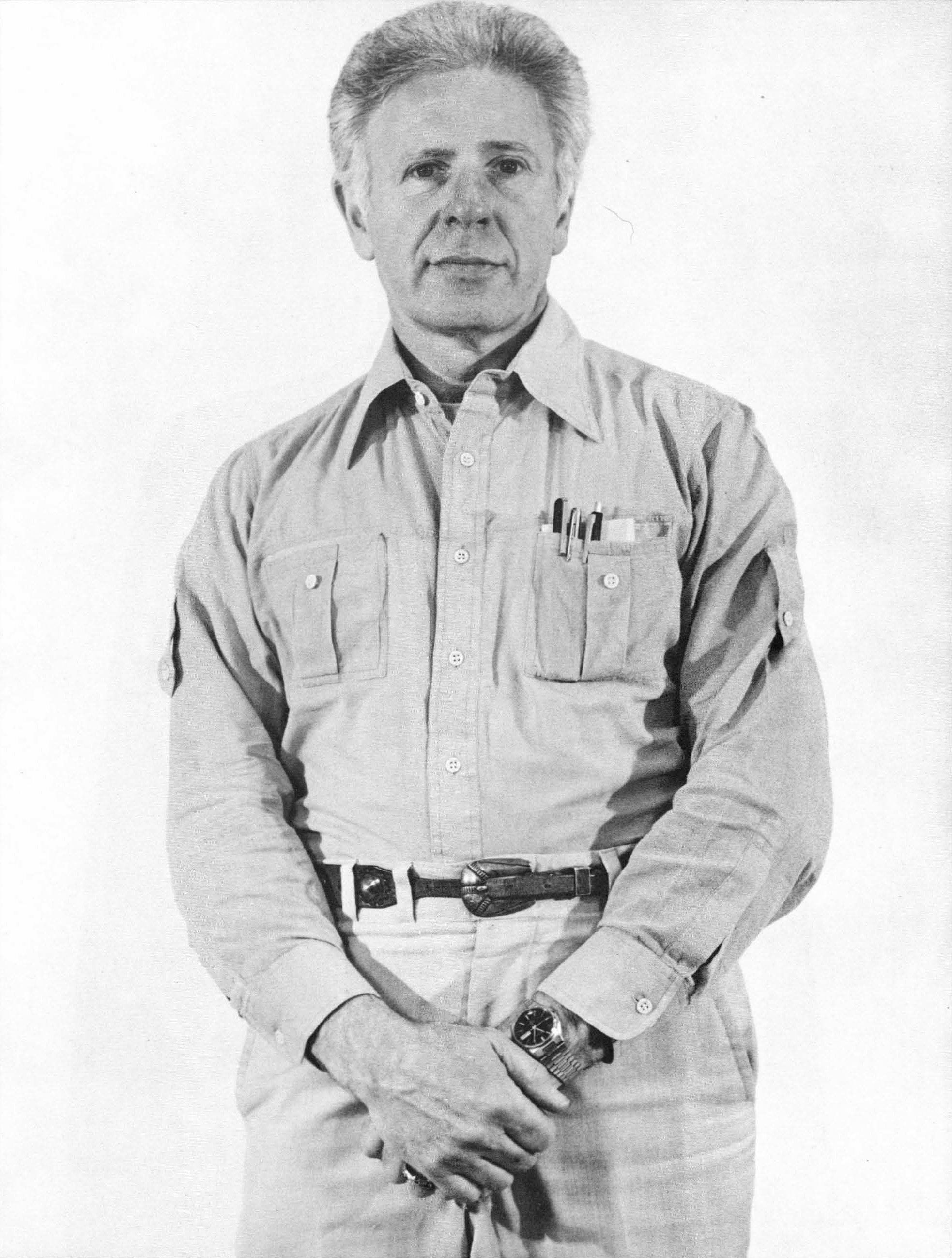
- Goldberger in 1978

4th President of the California Institute of Technology
- In office 1978–1987
- Preceded by: Harold Brown
- Succeeded by: Thomas Eugene Everhart

Personal details
- Born: October 22, 1922 Chicago, Illinois, U.S.
- Died: November 26, 2014 (aged 92) La Jolla, California, U.S.
- Spouse: Mildred Goldberger
- Other name: Murph
- Scientific career
- Education: Carnegie Institute of Technology (B.A.); University of Chicago (Ph.D.)
- Known for: Crossing symmetry
- Awards: Dannie Heineman Prize for Mathematical Physics (1961)
- Fields: Theoretical physics
- Workplaces: Princeton University; California Institute of Technology; Institute for Advanced Study; University of California, Los Angeles; University of California, San Diego
- Thesis: The interaction of high energy neutrons with heavy nuclei (1948)
- Doctoral advisor: Enrico Fermi
- Doctoral students: Fred Gilman; Martin B. Einhorn (1968)

Marvin Leonard "Murph" Goldberger (October 22, 1922 – November 26, 2014) was an American theoretical physicist who served as the president of the California Institute of Technology.

== Early life and education ==
Goldberger was born in Chicago, Illinois. He received his B.S. from the Carnegie Institute of Technology (now Carnegie Mellon University) and earned his Ph.D. in physics from the University of Chicago in 1948. His thesis advisor for Interaction of High-Energy Neutrons with Heavy Nuclei was Enrico Fermi.

== Career ==
While serving in the Army shortly after graduation, he worked on the Manhattan Project under renowned physicist Enrico Fermi from 1943 to 1945.

By at least 1951, Goldberger was a postdoc at MIT, where he shared a communal physics office collaborated with Murray Gell-Mann. Goldberger suggested Gell-Mann join him at Chicago starting in 1952, before he became a professor of physics at Princeton University from 1957 to 1977. He received the Dannie Heineman Prize for Mathematical Physics in 1961 and was elected to the U.S. National Academy of Sciences in 1963. In 1965, he was elected a fellow of the American Academy of Arts and Sciences. In 1980, he was elected to the American Philosophical Society.

From 1978 to 1987, Goldberger served as the president of Caltech. He was the director of the Institute for Advanced Study from 1987 to 1991. From 1991 to 1993, he was a professor of physics at the University of California, Los Angeles. From 1993 until his death in November 2014, he served on the faculty of the University of California, San Diego, initially as a professor of physics and later as a professor emeritus. Goldberger also served as Dean of Natural Sciences for UC San Diego from 1994 to 1999.

In 1954, he and Murray Gell-Mann introduced crossing symmetry. Four years later, he and Sam Bard Treiman published the so-called Goldberger–Treiman relation.

Goldberger participated in Project 137 in 1958 and became the first chairman of JASON. He was involved in nuclear arms control efforts. He also advised several major corporations; for example, he served on the board of directors of General Motors for 12 years.

Several of his doctoral students were elected Fellows of the American Physical Society: Allan N. Kaufman in 1962, Cyrus D. Cantrell in 1980, and Martin B. Einhorn in 1991.

== Personal life ==
Goldberger died in November 2014 in La Jolla, California. His wife, Mildred Goldberger, who also worked on the Manhattan Project, died in 2006. Upon his death he was survived by two sons and three grandchildren.

== Bibliography ==
- Marvin L. Goldberger (1961). Introduction to the theory and applications of dispersion relations. Hermann. (In Relations de dispersion et particules élémentaires: École d'été de physique théorique, Les Houches, 1960)
- Marvin L. Goldberger & Kenneth M. Watson (2004). Collision Theory. Dover. ISBN 0-486-43507-5. (corrected version of book originally published in 1964)
- Francesco Calogero; Marvin L. Goldberger; Sergei P. Kapitza, eds. (1991). Verification: Monitoring Disarmament. Westview Press. ISBN 0-8133-0965-4.

Academic offices
Preceded by Harold Brown	4th President of the California Institute of Technology; 1978–1987	Succeeded by Thomas Everhart
