= Herbert H. Chen =

Chinese-American Physicist

Herbert Hwa-sen Chen
- 陈华生
- Born: March 16, 1942; Chongqing, China
- Died: November 7, 1987 (aged 45); Irvine, California, U.S.
- Education: California Institute of Technology (BS); Princeton University (PhD)
- Spouse: Catherine Li (1969–1987)
- Scientific career
- Fields: Particle physics
- Workplaces: University of California, Irvine
- Thesis: Electromagnetic simulation of time reversal violation (1968)
- Doctoral advisor: Sam Treiman

Herbert Hwa-sen Chen (Chinese: 陈华生) (March 16, 1942 – November 7, 1987) was a Chinese-born American theoretical and experimental physicist at University of California, Irvine known for his contributions in the field of neutrino detection. Chen's work on observations of elastic neutrino-electron scattering provided important experimental support for the electroweak theory of the Standard Model of particle physics. In 1984 Chen realized that the deuterium of heavy water could be used as a detector that would distinguish the flavors of solar neutrinos. This idea led Chen to develop plans for the Sudbury Neutrino Observatory that would eventually make fundamental measurements demonstrating that neutrinos were particles with mass.

== Education and early life ==
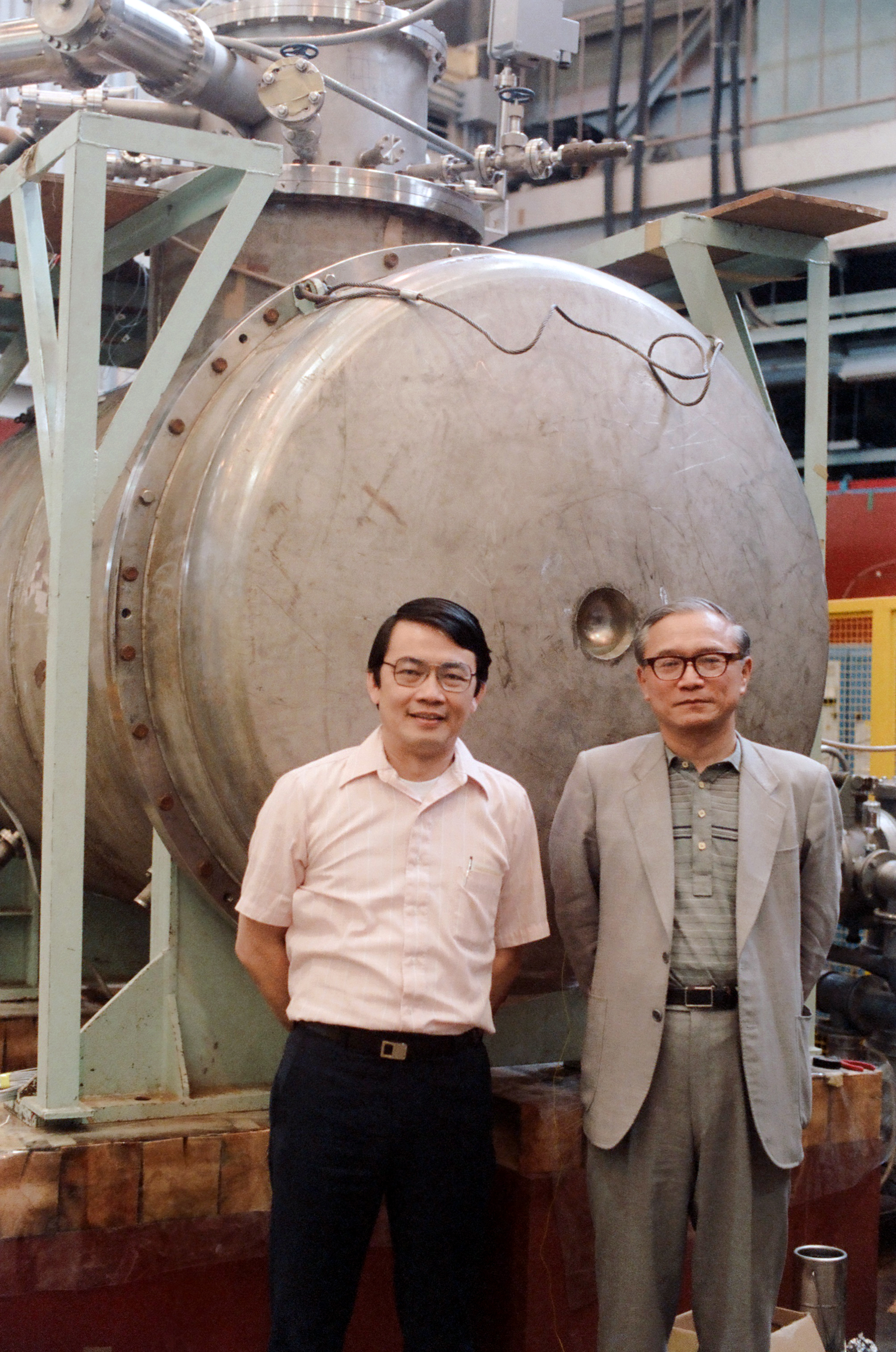
Chen (left) and Professor Tadayoshi Doke (right) during a visit to Waseda University in Tokyo in 1986. In the background is a cryostat, probably a liquid argon based calorimeter in Professor Doke's laboratory.

Born in Chongqing, China in 1942, Chen had an early childhood of wartime instability and insecurity. He immigrated to the United States with his family in 1955 under the Eisenhower Refugee Relief Act of 1953. He graduated high school from Cushing Academy, Massachusetts in 1960. With an education supported almost entirely by scholarships, he subsequently earned a Bachelor of Science degree in physics from the California Institute of Technology in 1964. Chen then earned his doctorate in theoretical physics from Princeton University in 1968, writing his thesis on "Electromagnetic simulation of time reversal violation" under the supervision of Sam Treiman.

Chen joined the newly formed physics department at University of California, Irvine as a postdoctoral theorist in 1968. He was an early addition to Frederick Reines' Neutrino Group. Reines had worked for the wartime Manhattan Project, and had discovered the neutrino in 1956, which would earn him a Nobel Prize in 1995, and had helped found the new university at Irvine in 1966. Though trained in theoretical physics, Chen began a long-term experimental program for the development of methods to measure the properties of neutrinos.

Chen was promoted to Associate Professor of Physics at U.C. Irvine in 1974, and to Professor of Physics in 1980.

== Neutrino physics at LAMPF ==
Chen began a research program to exploit the dense flux of neutrinos created at the Los Alamos Meson Physics Facility (LAMPF), now called the Los Alamos Neutron Science Center. While the LAMPF accelerator was designed primarily to accelerate a high-intensity beam of protons to energies high enough to produce unbound pions, by-products of LAMPF operation were intense pulses of neutrinos with kinetic energies between 10 and 55 million electron volts (MeV). In 1971, even before LAMPF began operation, K. Lande, F. Reines, and others including Chen proposed to exploit these neutrinos. By 1981 Chen was chair of the working group on neutrino facilities and on the Technical Advisory Panel of the LAMPF User's Group.

One focus of Chen's work at LAMPF was an experiment, E-225 begun in 1975 and headed by Chen, to measure electron neutrino-electron elastic scattering,

ν_{e} + e^{−} → ν_{e} + e^{−}.

This seemingly simple interaction is, in fact, a weak force interaction mediated by either the neutral Z^{0} or the charged W^{+}, W^{−} weak interaction bosons. In the latter interaction, the electron is converted to a neutrino (and vice versa) by the virtual particle exchange. Measurement of the elastic scattering was therefore a means to determine properties of the bosons, first detected at the particle physics laboratory CERN in 1983. Measurements of this cross section, final results published in 1993, were in excellent agreement with Standard Model predictions. By verifying the quantum mechanical interference effects of the two modes of interaction, LAMPF experiment E-225 was an important test of Standard Model theory.

== Liquid Argon Time Projection Chamber ==
In 1976 Chen with collaborators at U.C. Irvine and the California Institute of Technology proposed one of the earliest uses of liquid argon in a time projection chamber (liquid Ar TPC). This proposal was independent of, and almost simultaneous with, Carlo Rubbia's proposal to construct such a device at CERN for rare event particle physics experiments. Chen's initial goals with such a detector were to study neutrino-electron scattering, but the goals evolved to measure solar or cosmic neutrinos or proton decay.

== Computing for particle physics by network ==
In 1984 Chen chaired an ad hoc committee sponsored by the National Science Foundation (NSF) to examine the problem of how particle physicists could obtain remote access to the few NSF Supercomputing Centers around the United States for their computations. As described by John Cramer, a professor of physics at the University of Washington in Seattle, the final report of the committee was compiled by Chen. The submitted report contributed to congressional action sponsored by Senator Al Gore. Eventually five new NSF Supercomputer Centers around the United States were created with the NSFNET designed to connect them to universities and other users. NSFNET was soon merged with ARPANET, and this network eventually became the Internet.

== The solar neutrino problem ==
The Sun is powered by nuclear fusion via the proton–proton chain reaction, which converts four protons into alpha particles, neutrinos, positrons, and energy. The energy of the fusion process is released in the form of electromagnetic radiation, gamma rays, and the kinetic energy of both the charged particles and the neutrinos. The neutrinos travel from the Sun's core to Earth without any appreciable absorption by the Sun's outer layers. The expected number of solar neutrinos arriving at the earth could be computed using the standard solar model. The model gives a detailed account of the Sun's internal operation.

In the late 1960s, Ray Davis and John N. Bahcall designed the Homestake Experiment to measure the flux of neutrinos from the Sun. Within the Homestake Gold Mine in Lead, South Dakota, Davis placed a 380 cubic meter (100,000 gallon) tank of perchloroethylene 1,478 meters (4,850 feet) underground as a neutrino target. The experiment would measure neutrino interactions with chlorine, since perchloroethylene is a common dry-cleaning fluid rich in that element. A target deep underground was needed to reduce the noise from cosmic rays, while a large target was needed since the probability of successful neutrino capture was very small. A very low effective detection rate was expected, even with the huge mass of the target. The experiment measured far fewer neutrino interactions than expected, thus indicating a deficit in the neutrino flux. Many subsequent radiochemical and water Cherenkov detectors confirmed the deficit, which became known as the solar neutrino problem. The result seemed to imply that neutrinos were changing their properties as they traveled from the sun to the earth.

In 2002, Ray Davis and Masatoshi Koshiba won part of the Nobel Prize in Physics for experimental work which found the number of solar neutrinos to be around a third of the number predicted by the standard solar model.

== Heavy water for a neutrino detector ==
In 1984, Chen proposed the use of a large heavy water detector as a means of observing neutrinos from the sun to resolve the solar neutrino problem. The use of the deuterium of heavy water had the property that neutrino interactions could be observed by both neutral current and charged current reactions:

ν + d^{+} → ν + p^{+} + n (neutral current)

ν_{e} + d^{+} → e^{−} + p^{+} + p^{+} (charged current)

where on the left ν, ν_{e}, and d refer to generic neutrino, electron neutrino, and deuterium, respectively, while on the right p^{+}, n, and e^{−} refer to proton, neutron, and electron. Their electric charges are indicated. There are three different neutrino types or flavors, electron, muon, or tau. The neutral current reaction involves all neutrino types, while the charged current reaction involves just the electron neutrino type. The charged current is mediated by the charged W^{+} and W^{−} bosons, while the neutral current is mediated by the neutral Z^{0}. The reactions above could be distinguished in the detector by their different properties, e.g., the gamma radiation from the capture of the neutron in the first reaction, and the Cherenkov radiation of the electron in the second reaction. The relative rates of these reactions would be very different if neutrinos did or did not change flavor as they traveled from the sun to the earth.

Chen and others formed the research team that designed the Sudbury Neutrino Observatory (SNO) to exploit the idea of his seminal paper. The observatory was to be located 2100 m underground in a nickel mine near Sudbury, Ontario, Canada. Chen was the U.S. leader and spokesman for this project, while George Ewan led the Canadian team. While one focus of the research was on the solar neutrino question, the use of the term "Observatory" was to emphasize the intent to use the facility to record neutrino pulses produced by astronomical events, neutrino astronomy. The astronomical observatory argument proved compelling after neutrino bursts were detected from supernova SN 1987A in February 1987. The initial problem Chen and the collaboration addressed was the acquisition of 1000 tones of heavy water from the Canadian nuclear power company Atomic Energy of Canada Limited that would be used as the detector. The principal problem with neutrino observations is that the chance of an interaction is so slight that huge numbers of possible targets are required to be able to observe the small number of interactions that occur.

== Death ==
During the intensive planning and development phase for SNO, Chen was diagnosed with leukemia. After a year-long battle with the disease, Chen died in November 1987. In January 1988, a symposium on neutrino physics was held at U.C. Irvine to honor Chen's contributions, moderated by Frederick Reines. A keynote speaker was Nobel laureate and astrophysicist William Fowler, who led a discussion on "Herb Chen and Solar Neutrinos."

The University of California, Irvine, Physical Sciences established the Herbert H. Chen Award "given to an outstanding junior level physics student."

== The Sudbury Neutrino Observatory ==
The Sudbury Neutrino Observatory was completed in the 1990s, and its first director was Chen's collaborator, Arthur B. McDonald. The observations by SNO would demonstrate that neutrinos oscillated between neutrino flavors (electron, muon, and tau), thus demonstrating that the neutrino was not massless. For this fundamental discovery in physics, McDonald and the Sudbury Neutrino Observatory Collaboration were awarded the 2015 Nobel Prize in Physics jointly with Japanese physicist Takaaki Kajita and the Super-Kamiokande Collaboration.

== See also ==
- Solar neutrino problem
- Frederick Reines
- Neutrino oscillation
- SN 1987A
- Neutrino astronomy
- The Irvine–Michigan–Brookhaven detector
