= Martin B. Einhorn =

American theoretical physicist

- Education: California Institute of Technology (BS); Princeton University (PhD)
- Scientific career
- Fields: Particle physics Quantum field theory
- Workplaces: Fermilab; University of Michigan
- Doctoral advisor: Marvin Leonard Goldberger

Martin B. Einhorn (14 August 1942) is an American theoretical physicist.

== Education and career ==
Einhorn received in 1965 his B.S. with honors from Caltech and in 1968 his Ph.D. from Princeton University under Marvin Leonard Goldberger. After postdoctoral positions at Stanford Linear Accelerator Center (SLAC) and at the Lawrence Berkeley Laboratory (LBL), he became a staff physicist at the Fermi National Accelerator Laboratory (Fermilab). In 1976, he joined the faculty of the physics department of the University of Michigan where he was eventually promoted to full professor and retired as professor emeritus in 2004.

He was a visiting professor at NORDITA, SLAC, the Hebrew University of Jerusalem, the Centre de physique des particules de Marseille (CPPM), and Ben Gurion University of the Negev in Beersheva. In the 1990s he was on the Sakurai Prize selection committee.

His research publications span topics in the parton model, perturbative and nonperturbative QCD, cosmology, Higgs physics, supersymmetric grand unification, mass singularities and their consequences, and extended technicolor models. His primary interest is in physics beyond the Standard Model.

Einhorn is an emeritus research professor of UCSB's Kavli Institute for Theoretical Physics and was the Institute's Deputy Director from 1990 to 1992 and from 2004 to 2013.

Einhorn worked as an Associate Director at University of California Stanford Linear Accelerator Center (SLAC) from 2011 to 2014.

== Honors and awards ==
- 1978 — Department of Energy's Outstanding Junior Investigator Award
- 1991 — elected a Fellow of the American Physical Society
- 2003 — Guggenheim Fellowship

== Selected publications ==
- Einhorn, M. B; Ellis, S. D (1975). "Hadronic production of the new resonances: Probing gluon distribution". Phys. Rev. D. 12 (7): 2007–2014. Bibcode:1975PhRvD..12.2007E. doi:10.1103/PhysRevD.12.2007.
- Einhorn, M.B; Jones, D.R.T (1982). "The weak mixing angle and unification mass in supersymmetric SU(5)". Nuclear Physics B. 196 (3): 475–488. Bibcode:1982NuPhB.196..475E. doi:10.1016/0550-3213(82)90502-8. hdl:2027.42/24033.
- Ford, C; Jones, D. R. T; Stephenson, P. W; Einhorn, M. B (1993). "The effective potential and the renormalisation group". Nuclear Physics B. 395 (1993): 17–34. arXiv:hep-lat/9210033. Bibcode:1993NuPhB.395...17F. CiteSeerX 10.1.1.286.4156. doi:10.1016/0550-3213(93)90206-5. S2CID 19170060.
- Einhorn, Martin B (1993). "Confinement, form factors, and deep-inelastic scattering in two-dimensional quantum chromodynamics". In: The Large N Expansion in Quantum Field Theory and Statistical Physics: From Spin-Systems to 2-Dimensional Gravity. pp. 125–145. doi:10.1142/9789814365802_0010. ISBN 978-981-02-0455-6.
- Arzt, C; Einhorn, M. B; Wudka, J (1995). "Patterns of deviation from the standard model". Nucl. Phys. B. 433 (1995): 41–66. arXiv:hep-ph/9405214. Bibcode:1995NuPhB.433...41A. doi:10.1016/0550-3213(94)00336-D. S2CID 119329526.
- Einhorn, Martin B; Timothy Jones, D. R (2010). "Inflation with non-minimal gravitational couplings and supergravity". Journal of High Energy Physics. 1003 (26): 26. arXiv:0912.2718. Bibcode:2010JHEP...03..026E. doi:10.1007/JHEP03(2010)026. S2CID 119242580.
