= Curtis Callan =

American physicist

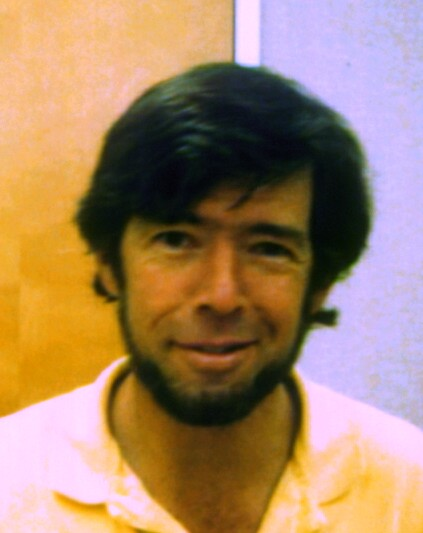
- (photo: 1986)
- Born: October 11, 1942 (age 83); North Adams, Massachusetts, U.S.
- Education: Haverford College; Princeton University
- Known for: Callan–Rubakov effect Callan–Symanzik equation CGHS model Callan–Treiman relation Contributions to instanton physics Theta vacuum
- Scientific career
- Workplaces: Princeton University
- Doctoral advisor: Sam Treiman
- Doctoral students: Philip Argyres; Peter Woit; Igor Klebanov; Juan Maldacena; William E. Caswell; Vijay Balasubramanian; Sekazi Mtingwa

Curtis Gove Callan Jr. (born October 11, 1942) is an American theoretical physicist and the James S. McDonnell Distinguished University Professor of Physics at Princeton University. He has conducted research in gauge theory, string theory, instantons, black holes, strong interactions, and many other topics. He was awarded the Sakurai Prize in 2000 ("For his classic formulation of the renormalization group, his contributions to instanton physics and to the theory of monopoles and strings") and the Dirac Medal in 2004.

== Biography ==
Callan received his B.S. in physics from Haverford College. He then pursued graduate studies in physics at Princeton University, where he was a student under Sam Treiman. He received his Ph.D. in physics in 1964 after completing a doctoral dissertation titled "Spherically symmetric cosmological models."

His Ph.D. students include Vijay Balasubramanian, William E. Caswell, Peter Woit, Igor Klebanov and Juan Maldacena.

Callan is best known for his work on broken scale invariance (Callan–Symanzik equation) and has also made leading contributions to quantum field theory and string theory in the areas of dyon-fermion dynamics, string solitons and black holes.

Callan has been a member of the JASON defense advisory group since 1968, and was chair of the group from 1990 to 1995. He served as president of the American Physical Society (APS) in 2010. He was elected a Fellow of the APS in 1971.

Callan was elected as a member of the American Academy of Arts and Sciences in 1987 and as a member of the National Academy of Sciences in 1989.
