= Philip Argyres =

American physicist and professor

- Education: University of Cincinnati
- Scientific career
- Fields: Physicist

Philip Argyres is an American physicist and professor at the University of Cincinnati. He is an Elected Fellow of the American Physical Society and a member of Simons Foundation.
