= Roger Dashen =

American theoretical physicist (1938–1995)

- Born: May 5, 1938; Grand Junction, Colorado
- Died: May 25, 1995 (aged 57); La Jolla, California
- Education: Caltech
- Known for: Quantum field theory

Roger Frederick Dashen (May 5, 1938 in Grand Junction, Colorado – May 25, 1995 in La Jolla) was an American theoretical physicist who studied particle physics and quantum field theory.

Dashen studied physics at the Harvard University (where he also played in the football team), where he graduated "summa cum laude" in 1960. Then he went to Caltech, where he earned his PhD in 1964. After that, he was a professor at Caltech in 1967 and the Institute for Advanced Study in 1969. In 1986, he became a professor at the University of California, San Diego (UCSD) in 1988 was Head of Faculty. He played a leading role in the establishment of a supercomputer center at UCSD and in the establishment of the Institute for Theoretical Physics of the National Science Foundation at the University of California, Santa Barbara.

In the 1960s he worked partly in collaboration with Murray Gell-Mann with current algebras of particle physics and models with chiral symmetry. In 1964, he worked on S-matrix methods to calculate electromagnetic corrections to strong interactions, including the mass difference between protons and neutrons with Steven Frautschi. In the 1970s, he studied with Brosl Hasslacher and André Neveu quantum field theoretical model theories (such as the Sine-Gordon model and the Gross-Neveu model) for extended particles and semiclassical approximations ([WKB approximation] []) for their analysis. They developed the Dashen-Hasslacher-Neveu method (DHN) for quantization of solitons using path integrals. After the discovery of instantons in the quantum (QCD) by Polyakov, he examined it with David Gross and Curtis Callan. In the 1980s, he worked with lattice gauge theory s and found with Neuberger (regardless of Giorgio Parisi) is an upper bound for the Higgs Boson - mass.

Dashen was also involved in sound propagation in the ocean (with military applications in mind), where he applied quantum field theoretical methods (such as path integrals and the renormalization group) on the problem of random scattering of sound in the ocean. He worked with his JASON colleagues Kenneth M. Watson and Frederik Zachariasen. Dashen was senior scientific adviser to the US Navy, including the committee on the safety of SSBNs, the rocket-carrying submarines, and matters relating to submarine warfare. He was a member of the JASON Defense Advisory Group.

Dashen was a member of the National Academy of Sciences since 1984.

He was married and had two daughters.

== Books ==
- Roger Dashen and Steve Adler: Current Algebras. Applications to Particle Physics . Benjamin 1968
