= Keith Brueckner =

American theoretical physicist (1924–2014)

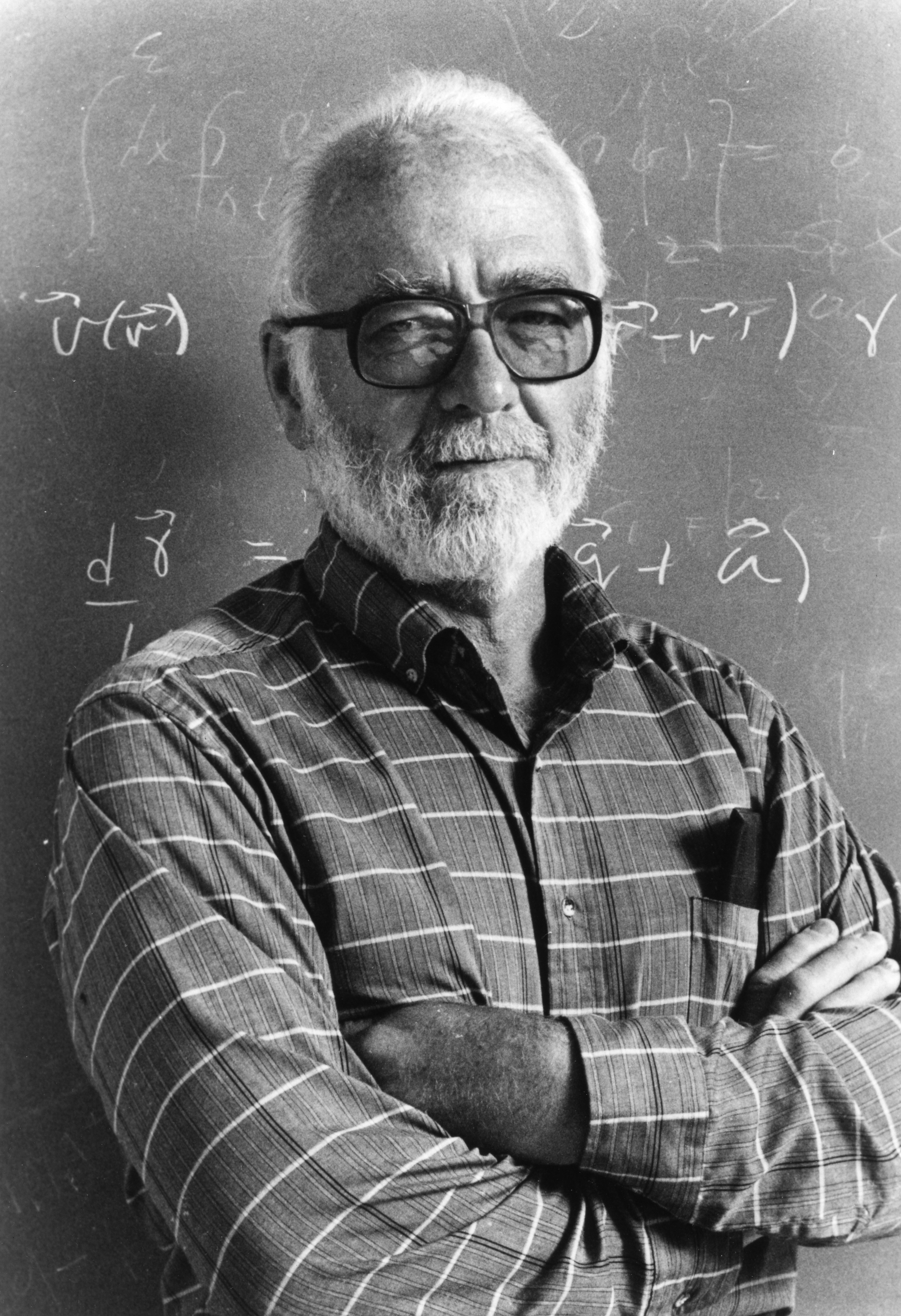
- Born: Keith Allen Brueckner; March 19, 1924; Minneapolis, Minnesota, United States
- Died: September 19, 2014 (aged 90)
- Education: University of Minnesota (BA, MA); UC Berkeley (PhD)
- Known for: Random phase approximation Linked-cluster theorem
- Scientific career
- Fields: Theoretical physics Condensed matter physics
- Workplaces: Indiana University; University of Pennsylvania; UC San Diego
- Doctoral advisor: Robert Serber

Keith Allen Brueckner (March 19, 1924 – September 19, 2014) was an American theoretical physicist who made important contributions in several areas of physics, including many-body theory in condensed matter physics, and laser fusion.

== Biography ==
Brueckner was born in Minneapolis on March 19, 1924. He earned a B.A. and M.A. in mathematics from the University of Minnesota in 1945 and 1947 and a Ph.D. in physics from the University of California, Berkeley, in 1950, supervised by Robert Serber.

After completing his Ph.D. he joined the physics faculty at Indiana University (1951–1955) and then at the University of Pennsylvania (1956–1959). In 1959, Brueckner was recruited by Roger Revelle to come to University of California, San Diego, where he became one of the founders of the Department of Physics.

Brueckner was instrumental in recruiting many faculty members to the new campus, as well as setting up the curriculum for the School of Science and Engineering. Over the course of his career at UC San Diego, Brueckner served as Director of the Institute of Radiation Physics and Aerodynamics and, later, Director of the Institute for Pure and Applied Physical Sciences.

In 1955, he proved the linked-cluster theorem (up to 4th order) for summing a series of Feynman diagrams.

He and Murray Gell-Mann collaborated to show that the random phase approximation (RPA) can be derived using Feynman diagrams in 1957. The relevance and correctness of RPA were heavily debated at the time. This was a seminal result, as it is often considered to be the first major accomplishment of modern quantum many-particle theory and has been an inspiration for the entire field.

== Awards ==
- Dannie Heineman Prize for Mathematical Physics, 1963
