= Robert W. Conn =

American physicist (born 1942)

- Born: Robert William Conn; December 1, 1942; Brooklyn, New York, United States
- Awards: Distinguished Alumni Award (California Institute of Technology), 1998 Distinguished Associate Award U.S. Department of Energy, 1992; Ernest Orlando Lawrence Award U.S. Department of Energy, 1984; Curtis W. McGraw Research Award, American Society for Engineering Education, 1982 Outstanding Achievement Award, Fusion Energy Development American Nuclear Society, 1979
- Scientific career
- Fields: Science Philanthropy, Higher Education Administration, Plasma Physics and Fusion Engineering, Nuclear and Fusion Energy Development, Semiconductor device fabrication
- Workplaces: The Kavli Foundation; Jacobs School of Engineering at the University of California, San Diego; University of California, Los Angeles; University of Wisconsin-Madison; California Institute of Technology; Pratt Institute

Robert W. Conn (born December 1, 1942) is an American physicist, engineer, and academic administrator who served as president and chief executive officer of The Kavli Foundation from 2009 to 2020. He is dean emeritus of the Jacobs School of Engineering at the University of California, San Diego, and served as chair of the Science Philanthropy Alliance, an organization that promotes private support for basic scientific research.

Conn is known for his contributions to fusion energy research and policy. In the 1970s, he co-founded the Fusion Technology Institute at the University of Wisconsin–Madison, and in 1986 founded the Institute of Plasma and Fusion Research at the University of California, Los Angeles. He also served on numerous federal advisory committees on fusion energy and chaired the Fusion Energy Advisory Committee of the United States Department of Energy.

As dean of engineering at UC San Diego from 1994 to 2009, Conn oversaw the expansion of several major research centers and programs, including the California Institute for Telecommunications and Information Technology (Calit2), the Center for Wireless Communications, and the Whitaker Center for Biomedical Engineering. During his tenure, the engineering school was renamed the Jacobs School of Engineering following a major endowment from Irwin M. Jacobs and Joan Jacobs. In the private sector, Conn co-founded Plasma & Materials Technologies, Inc. in 1986 and served as managing director of Enterprise Partners Venture Capital from 2002 to 2008.

== Education ==
Robert W. Conn was born in Brooklyn, N.Y. He graduated from Brooklyn Technical High School in 1960 and attended Pratt Institute, also in Brooklyn, graduating with a B.S. degree in chemical engineering with minors in physics and mathematics (1964). He did his graduate work at the California Institute of Technology in Pasadena, California, where he received an M.S. degree in mechanical engineering (1965) and a Ph.D. degree in engineering science (1968). Among his advisors were Noel Corngold.

== Career ==
=== University of Wisconsin-Madison ===
In 1970, Conn began his professional career at the University of Wisconsin-Madison (UW), where he joined the nuclear engineering department as a visiting associate professor. He became associate professor in 1972 and full professor in 1975. It was at UW that Conn participated in some of the nation's earliest feasibility studies of nuclear fusion energy. Between 1972 and 1980, he published nearly 100 articles and reports on plasma physics and fusion technology. Along with four colleagues, Conn founded UW's Fusion Technology Institute in 1972. He also became the university's Romnes Faculty Endowed Chair Professor in 1978.

Conn's early work came at a time when the federal government was eager to develop alternative sources of energy in the wake of the 1973 oil crisis. He became one the first researchers to study the potential of nuclear fusion reactors, in which the fusion of hydrogen nuclei releases tremendous amounts of energy in the form of neutrons and energetic particles such as helium ions, the heat from which is then used to generate electricity. Nuclear fusion is the process that fuels stars, but triggering and sustaining nuclear fusion in a controlled manner on Earth so it can generate energy at a power plant is not yet a practical reality.

==== Magnetic confinement reactor studies ====
In magnetic confinement reactors, hydrogen gas (usually a 50–50 mixture of two heavier isotopes of ordinary hydrogen, namely deuterium and tritium) is heated to very high temperatures (about 150 million degrees Celsius). At these high temperatures electrons separate from hydrogen nuclei and the gas becomes plasma, which is often referred to as the fourth state of matter, the others being solid, liquid and gas. By controlling, or confining, the flow of plasma in test reactors, engineers can cause hydrogen nuclei to collide and fuse – creating for short amounts of time a nuclear fusion reaction that generates heat. One of the unsolved challenges of controlled nuclear fusion energy is to sustain a reaction that generates more energy than what goes into just maintaining the operation of the reactor plasma itself.

In his early work, Conn studied numerous aspects of plasma for fusion applications, including how it can be confined with magnetic fields, thereby increasing its density and the likelihood that atomic nuclei collide and fuse. Conn also studied the boundary conditions between the plasma and the chamber walls inside a reactor, how to design the so-called “blanket region” surrounding the plasma chamber so as to capture the fusion energy released as neutrons, and many other science and engineering challenges associated with practical reactor development. Among the many reports for which Conn played a central role was the UWMAK-1 Study in 1973, which became a tutorial on reactor design used by private sector companies including Westinghouse and McDonald Douglas. His key partner in these studies was Professor Gerald Kulcinski, Grainger Professor of Engineering at UW.

==== Inertial confinement reactor studies ====
In inertial confinement reactors, lasers are fired at a pellet of fuel (often made from a combination of deuterium and tritium) with the goal of compressing, heating, and igniting the fusion fuel and creating a propagating burn through the compressed fuel plasma so as to burn approximately 30 percent before the compressed fuel, now in a very high temperature plasma state, itself disassembles.

While at UW, Conn collaborated with his colleagues on a research program called SOLASE that studied the physics and engineering challenges of inertial confinement reactors. The work identified the key physics, engineering, and technology issues that need to be solved if inertial fusion is to become a practical energy source. Among the many ideas advanced at that time was the use of a low-pressure gas in the chamber to absorb the primary radiation burst that accompanies each micro-explosion (not the neutrons generated) and cause that very short burst of radiation energy to be re-radiated to the walls over a much longer time scale. The SOLASE program studied numerous technological challenges, ranging from delivering fuel pellets to the center of the device at a rate of one to five per second, capturing the energy from the fusion events, shielding the laser beams from pellet explosion debris, and capturing the neutrons that carry 80 percent of the energy so as to make a practical power system.

==== Fusion-fission hybrid reactor studies ====
In fusion-fission hybrid reactors, high-energy fast neutrons generated by nuclear fusion can be used to convert fertile materials such as Thorium-232 or Uranium-238 into fissionable fuels for fission reactors such as Uranium-233 or Plutonium-239. The high-energy fusion-generated neutrons can also be used to trigger nuclear fission in traditional nuclear fuels such as Uranium-235. The hybrid reactor concept has a fusion reactor at the core and a surrounding “blanket” of fertile material, either Thorium-232 or Uranium-238. In a hybrid reactor, high-energy neutrons from fusion reactions are used to produce fissionable materials such as Uranium-233 or Plutonium-239 which would need then to be reprocessed and used as fuel in a fission nuclear power plant. One fusion hybrid plant can provide enough fuel for as many as five nuclear power plants of the same power.

Conn's work on inertial fusion hybrid reactors was conducted under the SOLASE-H program at the University of Wisconsin, and was supported by the Electric Power Research Institute (EPRI).

=== University of California, Los Angeles ===
At the University of California, Los Angeles, Conn conducted research in plasma physics, nuclear fusion, materials science, and energy policy. He founded and directed the Institute of Plasma and Fusion Research in 1986, co-led the U.S. Department of Energy's ARIES fusion power plant design program with Farrokh Najmabadi, and helped establish the PISCES plasma-material interaction facility. He also led the international Advanced Limiter Test (ALT) program at Forschungszentrum Jülich and became chair of the Fusion Energy Advisory Committee in 1991.

=== University of California, San Diego ===
In 1993, Conn moved to the University of California, San Diego (UC San Diego) to become dean of its school of engineering, which in 1998 became the Irwin and Joan Jacobs School of Engineering. He was also UC San Diego's Walter J. Zable Professor of Engineering Science. Conn led the Jacobs School through a period of rapid growth, during which numerous research centers were formed. These included the Center for Wireless Communications, the Whitaker Center for Biomedical Engineering, and the California Institute for Telecommunications and Information Technology (Calit2). Today, the Jacobs School ranks 10th in the nation and 23rd in the world according to the 2016 Academic Ranking of World Universities in Engineering/Technology and Computer Sciences conducted by ShanghaiRanking Consultancy. At UC San Diego Conn also built partnerships between the university and private industry, establishing the von Liebig Center for Entrepreneurism and Technology Transfer. In the mid-1990s he served on a committee that reviewed fusion energy for the United States President's Council of Advisors on Science and Technology, also known as PCAST.

During his career in academia, Conn published more than 300 journal articles, conference papers, book chapters and op-eds related to fusion energy science and engineering. Among them was a 216-page book chapter on magnetic fusion reactors in the 1981 book “Fusion,” which was edited by the physicist Edward Teller.

=== Private sector ===
From 1986 to 1994, roughly paralleling his time at UCLA, Conn co-founded a company called Plasma & Materials Technologies, Inc. (PMT), which developed a system known as MORI that was used for plasma etching and chemical vapor deposition (CVD), steps that are central to the fabrication of semiconductors. The company had an initial public offering, or IPO, on NASDAQ in 1995, and was later acquired. From 2002 to 2008, after leaving the Jacobs School at UC San Diego, Conn became managing director of Enterprise Partners Venture Capital (EPVC), a venture capital firm that invested in both high technology and biotechnology companies.

=== The Kavli Foundation ===
In 2009 Conn became the second president of The Kavli Foundation, succeeding Dr. David H. Auston, who served as the foundation's president from 2002 to 2008. Fred Kavli, the founder of The Kavli Foundation, served as chairman and chief executive officer. On Fred Kavli's death in 2013, Conn also assumed the title of chief executive officer.

As head of The Kavli Foundation, which is based in Los Angeles, California, Conn led its efforts to support research in astrophysics, nanoscience, neuroscience, and theoretical physics at academic institutions around the world.

Through a joint venture in 2005, the Norwegian Academy of Science and Letters, the Norwegian Ministry of Education and Research, and The Kavli Foundation established the Kavli Prize to honor, support, and recognize scientists for outstanding work in astrophysics, nanoscience, and neuroscience.

The foundation also works to promote increased public understanding of scientists and their work, has programs to help scientists become better communicators, and has programs with museums and other public institutions to help reach the general public about science. The foundation supports a meeting program that has led to a number of new science initiatives. Among them is The BRAIN Initiative, a broad collaborative research initiative launched in 2013 to accelerate the development of technologies that will enable scientists to visualize, in real time, how the brain functions at the level of individual cells and cell networks. From 2009 to early 2017, The Kavli Foundation expanded the number of science institutes in its name from 15 to 20.

=== Science Philanthropy Alliance ===
Conn is also board chair of the Science Philanthropy Alliance, which seeks to increase philanthropic giving to basic science and advises new, emerging, and current philanthropists as they pursue their interests in supporting science research. The Alliance was founded in 2012, with The Kavli Foundation as one of its founding partners. In 2016, Mark Zuckerberg acknowledged the Alliance's role in advising the Chan Zuckerberg Initiative, which that year announced a $3 billion commitment to basic science research, making it the second key area of focus of their philanthropy, after education.

== Awards and honors ==
Conn was elected in 1982 a fellow of both the American Physical Society and the American Nuclear Society. In 1987, Conn was elected to the National Academy of Engineering for major pioneering contributions in the fields of fusion engineering, fusion plasma analysis, and fusion reactor design.

Awards received include the 2018 Revelle Medal from the University of California, San Diego, the 1998 Distinguished Alumni Award from the California Institute of Technology, the 1992 Distinguished Associate Award from the U.S. Department of Energy, the 1984 Ernest Orlando Lawrence Award from the U.S. Department of Energy (awarded by the department on behalf of the U.S. president), the 1982 Curtis W. McGraw Research Award of the American Society for Engineering Education, and the 1979 Outstanding Achievement Award for fusion energy research from the American Nuclear Society. In 1984, when Conn received the Ernest Orlando Lawrence Award, the U.S. Department of Energy cited Conn's "pioneering contributions to fusion reactor engineering and for his articulate representation of the engineering needs of fusion."

== Outreach ==
Conn has argued that continued public funding is critical, and he has noted that government funding of basic science is about fifteen times that of philanthropy. “Philanthropy is no substitute for government funding. You can’t say that loud enough,” he told The New York Times in a Mar. 15, 2014 article on concerns over increasing private support for science projects.

== Affiliations ==
- Member, National Academy of Engineering
- Fellow, American Physical Society
- Fellow, American Nuclear Society
