= Mount Favorite =

Mountain in Alaska, United States

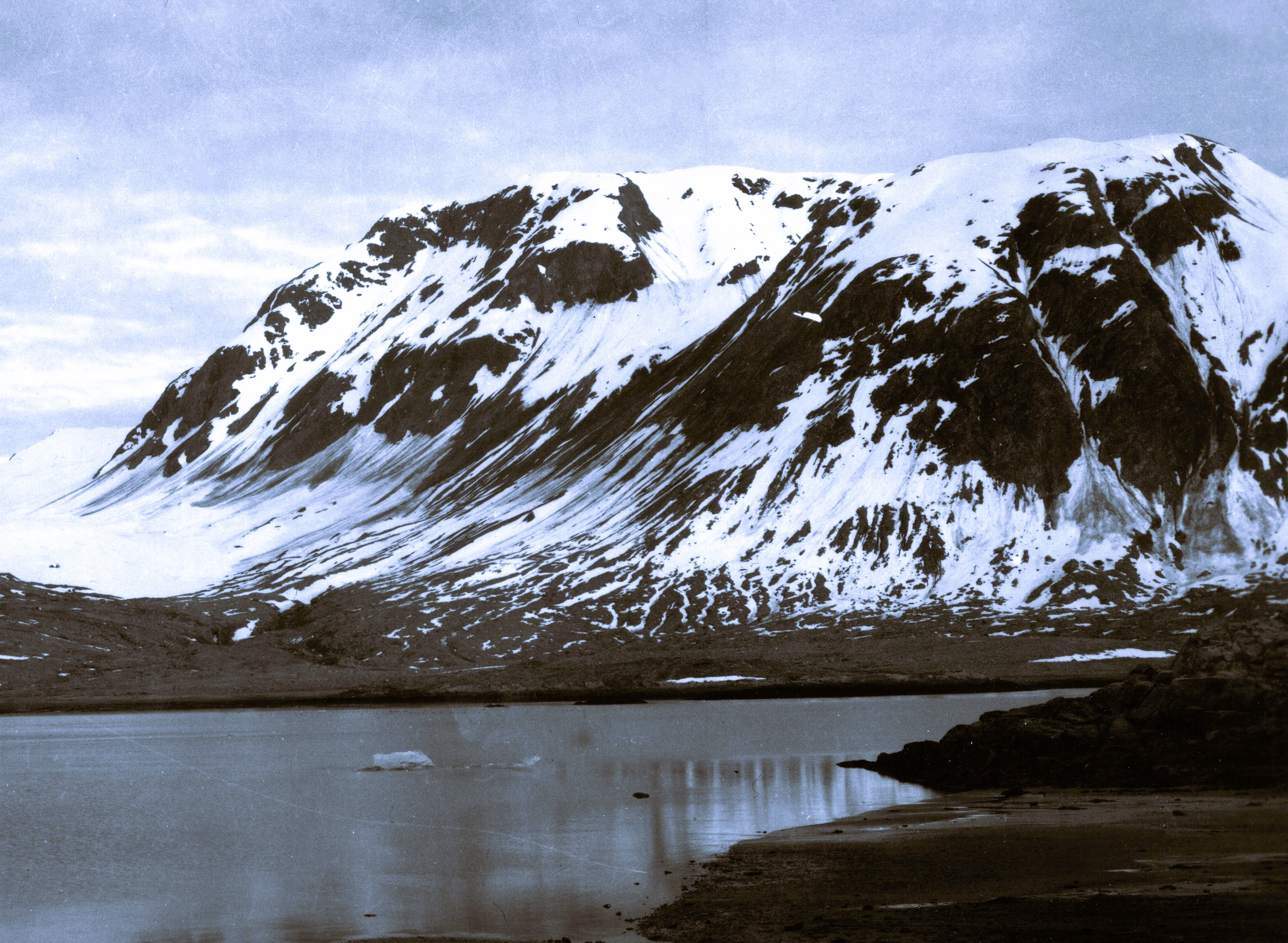
- North aspect

Highest point
- Elevation: 2,500 ft (762 m)
- Prominence: 1,496 ft (456 m)
- Isolation: 1.24 mi (2.00 km)
- Coordinates: 58°42′40″N 136°29′40″W

Geography
- Location within Alaska
- Country: United States
- State: Alaska
- Census Area: Hoonah–Angoon
- Protected area: Glacier Bay National Park
- Parent range: Saint Elias Mountains; Fairweather Range
- Topo map: USGS Mount Fairweather C-2

Mount Favorite is a 2,500-foot (762 m) mountain summit in the US state of Alaska.

== Description ==
Mount Favorite is located in the Fairweather Range of the Saint Elias Mountains. It is set within Glacier Bay National Park and Preserve and is situated 5.6 miles (9.0 km) southeast of Gullied Peak. Although modest in elevation, topographic relief is significant as the summit rises from tidewater of Charpentier Inlet in approximately one mile (1.6 km). The mountain's name was reported in 1951 by U.S. Geological Survey and the toponym has been officially adopted by the U.S. Board on Geographic Names.

== Climate ==
Based on the Köppen climate classification, Mount Favorite is located in a marine subpolar climate zone, with long, cold, snowy winters, and cool summers. Weather systems coming off the Gulf of Alaska are forced upwards by the Saint Elias Mountains (orographic lift), causing heavy precipitation in the form of rainfall and snowfall. Winter temperatures can drop below 0 °F with wind chill factors below −10 °F.

== See also ==
- Geography of Alaska
