= Kavli Foundation =

Kavli Foundation may refer to:

- Kavli Trust (Norwegian: Kavlifondet), a Norwegian foundation that owns Kavli Holding AS
- Kavli Foundation (United States), an American foundation established in 2000

== See also ==
- Kavli (disambiguation)
