= Richard R. Freeman =

American physicist, academic and researcher (1944–2024)

- Born: Richard Reiling Freeman; November 13, 1944; Corpus Christi, Texas, U.S.
- Died: March 25, 2024 (aged 79)
- Occupations: Physicist, academic and researcher
- Title: Emeritus Edward Teller Professor of Applied Science
- Awards: Fellow, Optical Society of America; Fellow, American Physical Society

Academic background
- Education: B.S., physics A.M., physics Ph.D., physics
- Alma mater: University of Washington; Harvard University
- Doctoral advisor: Norman Ramsey

Academic work
- Institutions: University of Washington; Ohio State University; University of California, Davis

Richard Reiling Freeman (November 13, 1944 – March 25, 2024) was an American physicist, academic and researcher. He was an affiliated professor of physics at the University of Washington, a distinguished emeritus professor of mathematical and physical science at Ohio State University, and an emeritus Edward Teller Professor of Applied Science at University of California, Davis.

Freeman’s research specialized in high energy density physics. He authored over 350 peer-reviewed research papers and holds six patents in the fields of lithography and laser processing. His graduate textbook, Electromagnetic Radiation, was published in 2019.

He was a fellow of American Physical Society (APS) and Optical Society of America.

== Education ==
Freeman completed his B.S. degree in physics from University of Washington in 1967. He then studied at Harvard University and earned his A.M. and Ph.D. degrees in physics in 1968 and 1973, respectively. He then completed his postdoctoral studies Massachusetts Institute of Technology in 1976.

== Career ==
Along with his post-doctoral studies, Freeman taught at MIT as a lecturer in physics from 1973 to 1976. From 1976 till 1996, he was then associated with AT&T Bell Laboratories where he served as a member of technical staff, and variously as departmental head of electromagnetic phenomena research, silicon electronics research, advanced lithography research, and strategic planning and business departments.

In 1996, he was appointed by Lawrence Livermore National Laboratory as a deputy associate director of laser programs. In 1998, Freeman left Lawrence Livermore National Laboratory and joined University of California, Davis, where he held positions of chair and Edward Teller Professor at Department of Engineering Applied Science till 2003. He was then recruited by Ohio State University as a distinguished professor of mathematical and physical sciences. During his term at Ohio State University, he served as dean of College of Math and Physical Sciences from 2003 through 2007, as head of the high energy density research group and as the first director of the SCARLET laser facility.

In 2015, Freeman was appointed as an affiliated professor of physics at University of Washington, and as an emeritus professor at Ohio State University and University of California, Davis.

== Research ==
Freeman conducted research focused on various fields, including atomic physics, high energy density physics, lithography, laser processing, electromagnetics, semiconductors and laser physics.

=== Atomic physics ===
Freeman focused on the energy level systematics of high-angular-momentum Rydberg states of alkali-metal atoms and described them through a quantum-defect model. His research indicated polarization of core electrons to be the major contribution to the quantum defect.

=== High energy density physics ===
Freeman studied light absorption in ultra-short scale length plasmas and calculated the absorption of S and P polarized light at a glossy interface. He explained different methods to model the absorption of a short laser pulse as a function of intensity.

He conducted numerical simulations of the energy spectrum of electrons escaping in a cell code large-scale plasma and found a significant difference in the simulated energy spectrum recorded by electron spectrometer and the computations made within the target. He then presented the mechanisms responsible for the resulting difference and also discussed the applications of constraints regarding obtaining electron energy distributions from experimental data.

=== Lithography ===
Freeman worked extensively on lithography during 1990s. He presented Schwarzschild imaging optics for improving alignment stability and demonstrated soft-x-ray projection imaging using radiation from plasma source and ellipsoidal condenser. Using the Schwarzschild camera, magnetically levitated wafer stage and a plasma source, he presented EUV lithography tool and incorporated camera aberrations into physical-optic simulations. Freeman’s research resulted in successful matching of five multilayer reflecting surfaces.

Freeman used the scattering with angular limitation projection electron-beam lithography (SCALPEL) principle to help design the proof-of-concept projection electron-beam lithography system and highlighted the application of the designed technology for the production of sub-0.18 micrometer features.

=== Laser physics ===
Freeman extensively studied the changes in atomic structure when an atom is subjected to extremely intense laser light, and published numerous papers explaining the highly modified phoionization yields of atoms irradiated by extremely high intensity laser light compared to that obtained at low intensities.

He developed a method involving detection of ionization products, for measuring peak intensity at the focus of high energy short pulse lasers operating in single shot mode. He conducted a combined study of particle-in-cell and Monte Carlo modeling and investigated the production of Bremsstrahlung radiation during the interaction of ultra-intense laser with a tower-structured target. Freeman found that the targets narrowed the electron angular distribution and generated higher energies.

Freeman published a paper regarding backward-propagating MeV electrons from 1018 W/cm2 laser interactions with water. Freeman’s research indicated that the backward-going, high-energy electrons interacting with the focusing optic resulted in the generation of energetic x-rays in the experiment. He also demonstrated the suppression of high energy radiation by reducing nanosecond-scale pre-pulse. Freeman further presented a diagnostic tool for the alignment of targets in laser-matter interactions in a precise manner.

== Death ==
Freeman died on March 25, 2024, at the age of 79.

== Awards and honors ==
- 1981 - Fellow, Optical Society of America
- 1982 - Fellow, American Physical Society
- 2002 - Appointed Edward Teller Professor of Applied Science

== Bibliography ==
=== Books ===
- with James A. King and Gregory P. Lafyatis: Electromagnetic Radiation (2019) ISBN 978-0198726500

=== Selected articles ===
- Ducas, T.W., Littman, M.G., Freeman, R.R. and Kleppner, D., 1975. Stark ionization of high-lying states of sodium. Physical Review Letters, 35(6), p. 366.
- Littman, M.G., Zimmerman, M.L., Ducas, T.W., Freeman, R.R. and Kleppner, D., 1976. Structure of sodium Rydberg states in weak to strong electric fields. Physical Review Letters, 36(14), p. 788.
- Freeman, R.R. and Kleppner, D., 1976. Core polarization and quantum defects in high-angular-momentum states of alkali atoms. Physical Review A, 14(5), p. 1614.
- Freeman, R.R., Bucksbaum, P.H., Milchberg, H., Darack, S., Guesic, M., 1987. Above-threshold Ionization with subpicosecond laser pulses”, Physical Review Letters, 59 (10) Sept. 1987, p. 1092
- Bucksbaum, P.H., Freeman, R.R., Bashkansky, M. and McIlrath, T.J., 1987. Role of the ponderomotive potential in above-threshold ionization. JOSA B, 4(5), pp. 760–764.
- Bloomfield, L.A., Freeman, R.R., Brown, W.L., “Photofragmentation of Mass-Resolved Si-2-12(+) Clusters” Physical Review Letters 54(20), p2246
- Milchberg, H.M., Freeman, R.R., Davey, Sc., More, R.M., ”Resistivity of a Simple Metal from Room Temperature to 106K” Physical Review Letters 61(20), p 2364

== Sources ==
- Kramer Akli, Philip Bucksbaum, Mike Campbell and Howard Milchberg. Richard R. Freeman, 1944–2024 // Optics & Photonics News, Nov. 2024, p. 54.
- In Memoriam: Richard Reiling Freeman, 1944—2024 // Optica
