= Eric G. Adelberger =

American physicist (born 1938)

Eric George Adelberger (born June 26, 1938 in Bryn Mawr, Pennsylvania) is an American experimental nuclear physicist and gravitational metrologist.

== Biography ==
He graduated from Washington-Lee High School (now known as Washington-Liberty High School), and then matriculated at California Institute of Technology (Caltech), where he was inspired by Richard Feynman. At Caltech Adelberger graduated in 1960 with a B.S. and in 1967 with a Ph.D. under the supervision of Charles A. Barnes (1921–2015). As a postdoc Adelberger was from 1967 to 1968 a research fellow at Caltech and from 1968 to 1969 a research associate at Stanford University. From 1969 to 1971 he was an assistant professor at Princeton University. At Seattle's University of Washington, he was from 1971 to 1972 an assistant professor, from 1972 to 1975 an associate professor, and from 1975 to 2007 a full professor, retiring in 2007 as professor emeritus. From 1978 to 1981 he was an associate editor for Physical Review Letters.

His research deals with experimental nuclear physics (including fundamental symmetries in nuclei and nuclear structure) and experimental gravitational physics.

In the University of Washington's Eöt-wash Group, he has investigated the validity of Newton's law of gravitation down to small distances, smaller than the previously tested minimum distances in the mm range. In 2007, the group was able to rule out extra dimensions larger than 44 microns and hopes to be able to continue the experiment down to a few microns. With an improved torsion balance they also tested the equivalence principle for various substances and distances from 1 m to very large distances (from planet Earth to the centre of the Milky Way). They set new precision records in 2006 and 2008 for the Eötvös parameter with an accuracy that was not improved until the MICROSCOPE orbital satellite experiment in 2017.

In 1982 he received the Humboldt Senior Scientist Award. In 1985 he received the Tom W. Bonner Prize in Nuclear Physics for "his outstanding contributions in using nuclei to study fundamental symmetries, particularly studies of parity violation and isospin mixing." In 2021 he was awarded, jointly with Blayne Heckel and Jens H. Gundlach, the Breakthrough Prize in Fundamental Physics for "precision fundamental measurements that test our understanding of gravity, probe the nature of dark energy, and establish limits on couplings to dark matter."

Adelberger was elected in 1978 a fellow of the American Physical Society (APS), in 1994 a member of the National Academy of Sciences, and in 1998 a fellow of the American Academy of Arts and Sciences.

In August 1961 in Arlington, Virginia, he married Audra Elizabeth Browman. They have two children. Eric and Audra Adelberger have often backpacked and kayaked together and are long-time supporters of The Wilderness Society and The Nature Conservancy. In 1969, they made the first ascent of Mount Aleutka in Alaska.

== Selected publications ==
- Adelberger, E. G.; Haxton, W. C. (1985). "Parity Violation in the Nucleon-Nucleon Interaction". Annual Review of Nuclear and Particle Science. 35 (35): 501–558. Bibcode:1985ARNPS..35..501A. doi:10.1146/annurev.ns.35.120185.002441.
- Su, Y.; Heckel, B. R.; Adelberger, E. G.; Gundlach, J. H.; Harris, M.; Smith, G. L.; Swanson, H. E. (1994). "New tests of the universality of free fall". Physical Review D. 50 (6): 3614–3636. Bibcode:1994PhRvD..50.3614S. doi:10.1103/PhysRevD.50.3614. PMID 10018005.
- Adelberger, Eric G.; et al. (1998). "Solar fusion cross sections". Reviews of Modern Physics. 70 (4): 1265–1291. arXiv:astro-ph/9805121. Bibcode:1998RvMP...70.1265A. doi:10.1103/RevModPhys.70.1265. S2CID 16061677. (over 900 citations)
- Hoyle, C. D.; Schmidt, U.; Heckel, B. R.; Adelberger, E. G.; Gundlach, J. H.; Kapner, D. J.; Swanson, H. E. (2001). "Submillimeter Test of the Gravitational Inverse-Square Law: A Search for "Large" Extra Dimensions". Physical Review Letters. 86 (8): 1418–1421. arXiv:hep-ph/0011014. Bibcode:2001PhRvL..86.1418H. doi:10.1103/PhysRevLett.86.1418. PMID 11290157. S2CID 36937560.
- Adelberger, E.G.; Heckel, B.R.; Nelson, A.E. (2003). "Tests of the Gravitational Inverse-Square Law". Annual Review of Nuclear and Particle Science. 53: 77–121. arXiv:hep-ph/0307284. Bibcode:2003ARNPS..53...77A. doi:10.1146/annurev.nucl.53.041002.110503. S2CID 11174631. (over 900 citations)
- Hoyle, C. D.; Kapner, D. J.; Heckel, B. R.; Adelberger, E. G.; Gundlach, J. H.; Schmidt, U.; Swanson, H. E. (2004). "Submillimeter tests of the gravitational inverse-square law". Physical Review D. 70 (4) 042004. arXiv:hep-ph/0405262. Bibcode:2004PhRvD..70d2004H. doi:10.1103/PhysRevD.70.042004. S2CID 15002909.
- Adelberger, E. G.; et al. (2011). "Solar fusion cross sections. II. The pp chain and CNO cycles". Reviews of Modern Physics. 83 (1): 195–245. arXiv:1004.2318. Bibcode:2011RvMP...83..195A. doi:10.1103/RevModPhys.83.195. S2CID 119117147. (over 800 citations)
- Murphy, T. W.; Adelberger, E. G.; Battat, J B R.; Hoyle, C. D.; Johnson, N. H.; McMillan, R. J.; Stubbs, C. W.; Swanson, H. E. (2012). "APOLLO: Millimeter lunar laser ranging". Classical and Quantum Gravity. 29 (18) 184005. Bibcode:2012CQGra..29r4005M. doi:10.1088/0264-9381/29/18/184005. S2CID 13240200.
- Terrano, W. A.; Adelberger, E. G.; Lee, J. G.; Heckel, B. R. (2015). "Short-Range, Spin-Dependent Interactions of Electrons: A Probe for Exotic Pseudo-Goldstone Bosons". Physical Review Letters. 115 (20) 201801. arXiv:1508.02463. Bibcode:2015PhRvL.115t1801T. doi:10.1103/PhysRevLett.115.201801. PMID 26613430. S2CID 34586270.
- Lee, J. G.; Adelberger, E. G.; Cook, T. S.; Fleischer, S. M.; Heckel, B. R. (2020). "New Test of the Gravitational 1/ r ^{2} Law at Separations down to 52 μm". Physical Review Letters. 124 (10) 101101. arXiv:2002.11761. Bibcode:2020PhRvL.124j1101L. doi:10.1103/PhysRevLett.124.101101. PMID 32216404. S2CID 211532741.
- Shaw, E. A.; Ross, M. P.; Hagedorn, C. A.; Adelberger, E. G.; Gundlach, J. H. (2022). "Torsion-balance search for ultra low-mass bosonic dark matter". Physical Review D. 105 (4) 042007. arXiv:2109.08822. Bibcode:2022PhRvD.105d2007S. doi:10.1103/PhysRevD.105.042007. S2CID 237571682.
