= Gullied Peak =

Mountain in Alaska, United States

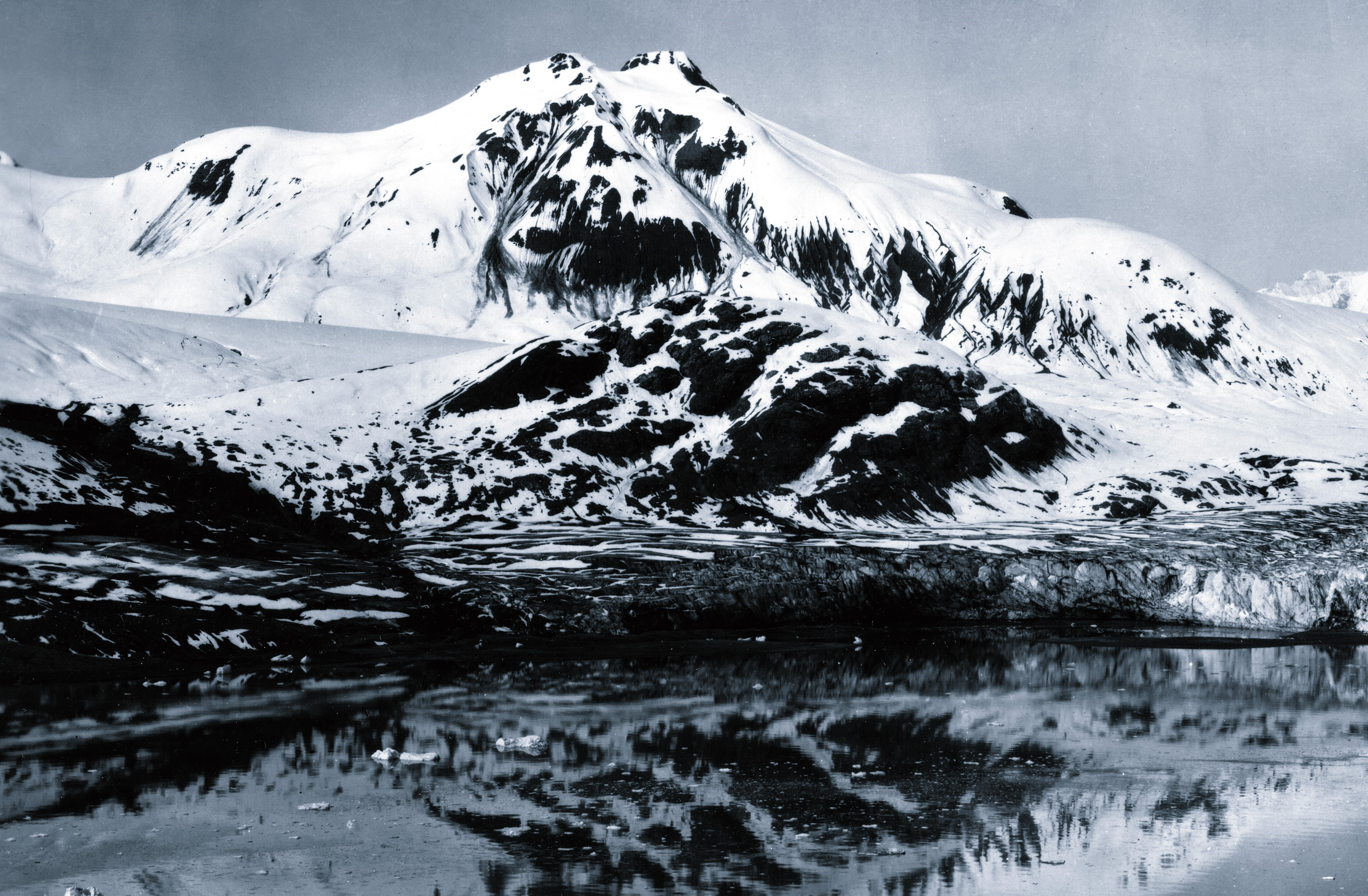
- East aspect in 1899

Highest point
- Elevation: 3,350 ft (1,021 m)
- Prominence: 1,200 ft (366 m)
- Isolation: 2.44 mi (3.93 km)
- Coordinates: 58°44′21″N 136°36′49″W

Naming
- Etymology: Gully

Geography
- Location within Alaska
- Interactive map of Gullied Peak
- Country: United States
- State: Alaska
- Census Area: Hoonah–Angoon
- Protected area: Glacier Bay National Park
- Parent range: Saint Elias Mountains; Fairweather Range
- Topo map: USGS Mount Fairweather C-2

Gullied Peak is a 3,350-foot (1,021 m) mountain summit in the US state of Alaska.

== Description ==
Gullied Peak is located in the Fairweather Range of the Saint Elias Mountains. It is set within Glacier Bay National Park and Preserve and is situated 5.73 miles (9.22 km) southeast of Mount Aleutka. Although modest in elevation, topographic relief is significant as the summit rises from tidewater at Hugh Miller Inlet in less than two miles (3.2 km), and the southwest slope rises 2,150 feet (655 m) in 0.65 mi (1.05 km). The mountain's descriptive name was reported in 1951 by U.S. Geological Survey and the toponym has been officially adopted by the U.S. Board on Geographic Names.

== Climate ==
Based on the Köppen climate classification, Gullied Peak is located in a marine subpolar climate zone, with long, cold, snowy winters, and cool summers. Weather systems coming off the Gulf of Alaska are forced upwards by the Saint Elias Mountains (orographic lift), causing heavy precipitation in the form of rainfall and snowfall. Winter temperatures can drop below 0 °F with wind chill factors below −10 °F. This climate supports the Hugh Miller Glacier southwest of this peak, although satellite images show this glacier has markedly retreated since images from 1899.

== Gallery ==
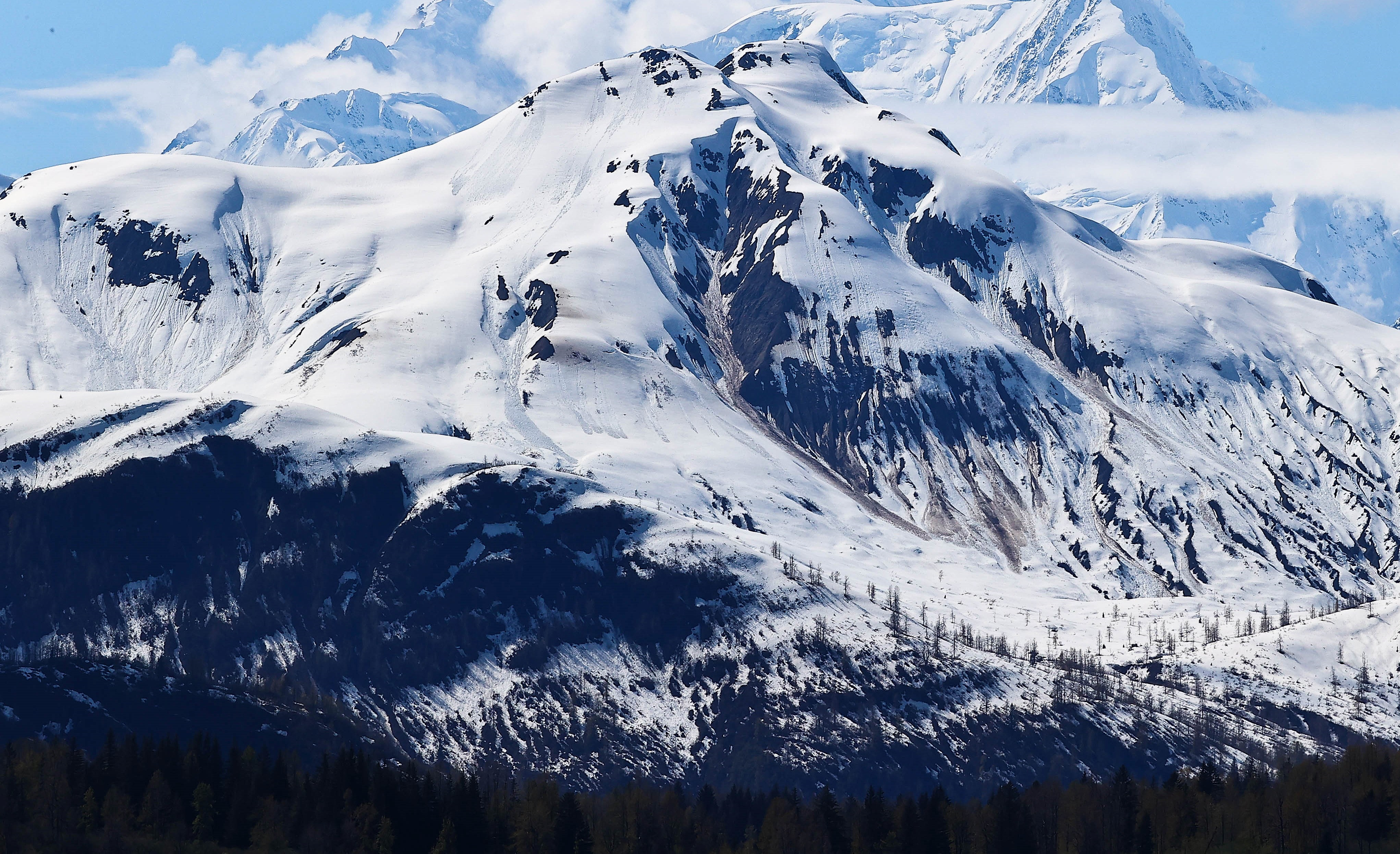
East aspect

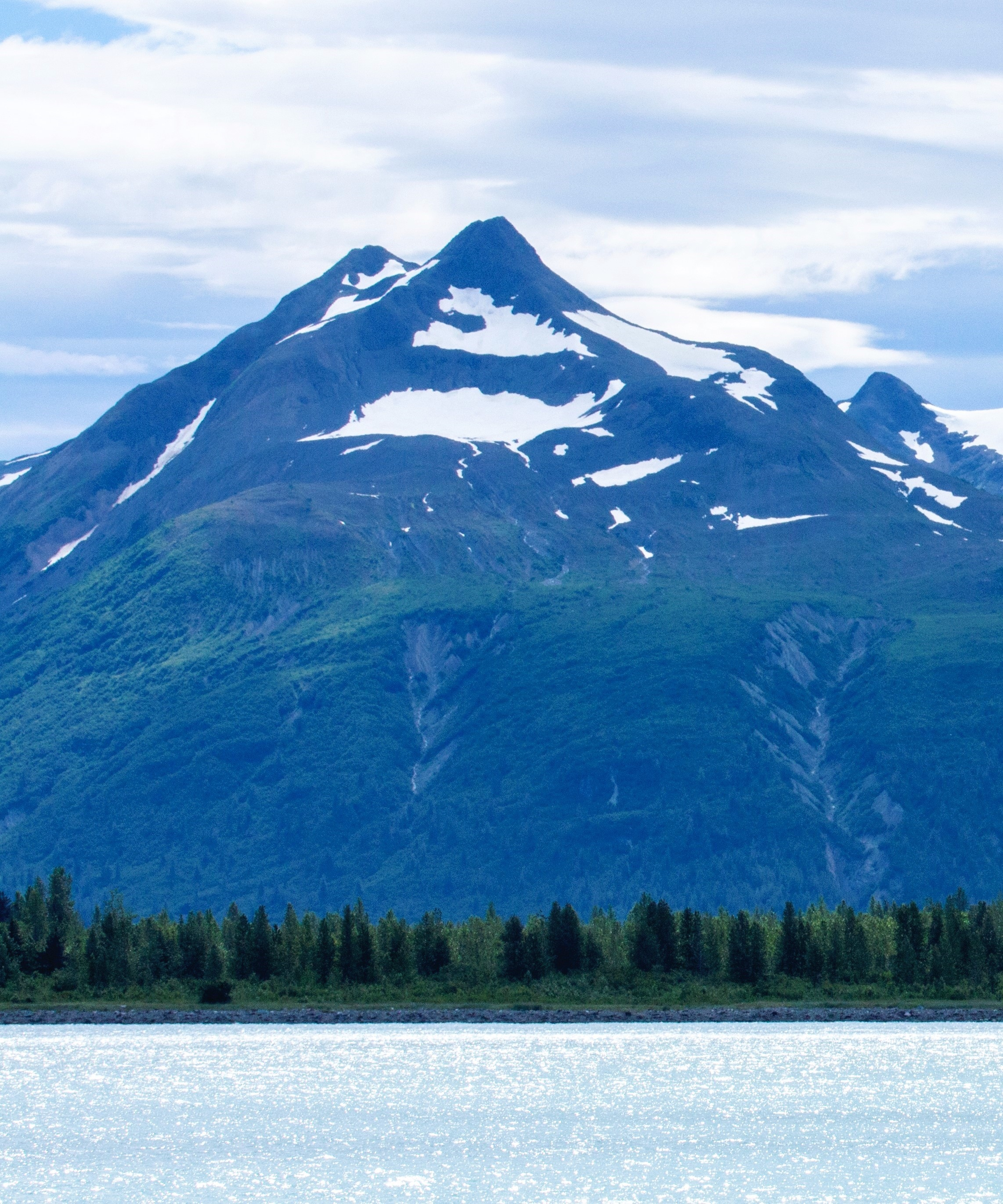
North aspect

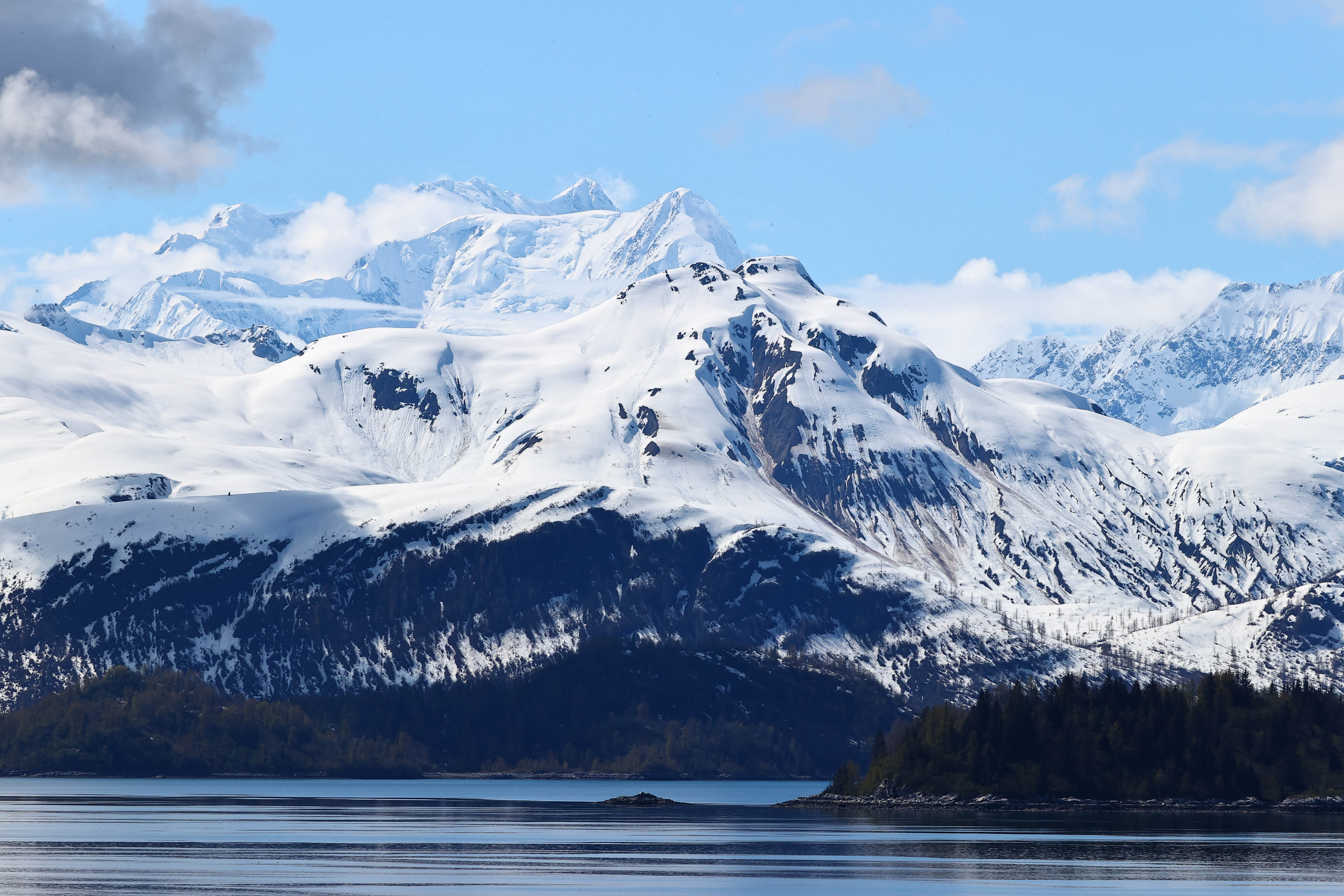
East aspect of Gullied Peak centered in front. (Mount Bertha and Mount Crillon in back)

== See also ==
- Geography of Alaska
