= Norman Ramsey Jr. =

American physicist (1915–2011)

Norman Foster Ramsey Jr.
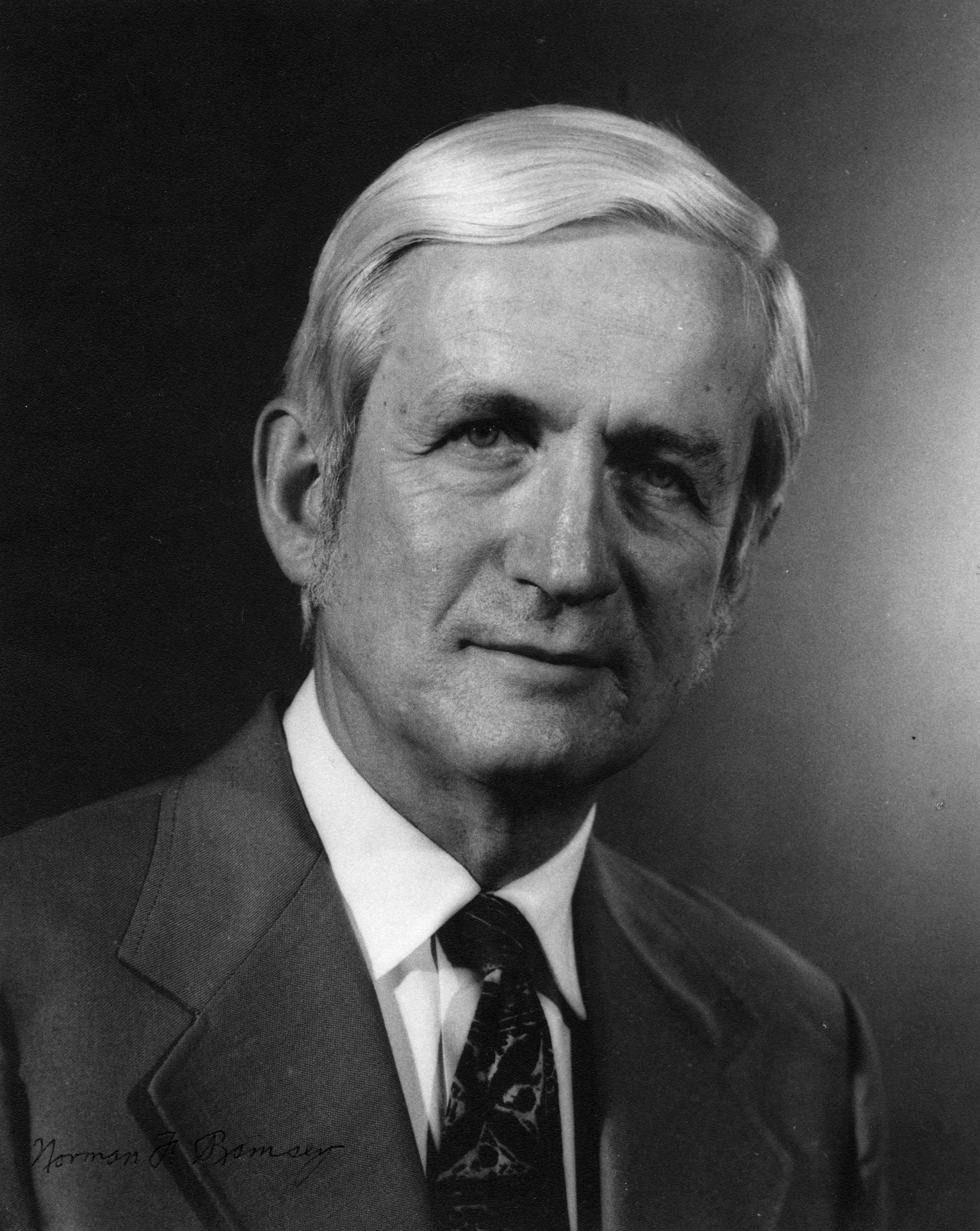
- Born: August 27, 1915; Washington, D.C., U.S.
- Died: November 4, 2011 (aged 96); Wayland, Massachusetts, U.S.
- Education: Columbia University (BA, PhD); University of Cambridge (BA)
- Known for: Ramsey interferometry
- Relatives: Anne Ramsey (cousin)
- Awards: Ernest Orlando Lawrence Award (1960); Davisson-Germer Prize (1974); IEEE Medal of Honor (1984); Rabi Prize (1985); Rumford Prize (1985); Oersted Medal (1988); National Medal of Science (1988); Nobel Prize in Physics (1989); UNSW Dirac Medal (1990); Vannevar Bush Award (1995)
- Scientific career
- Fields: Physics
- Workplaces: Columbia University; Harvard University
- Doctoral advisor: Isidor Isaac Rabi
- Doctoral students: William Nierenberg (1947); Francis F. Chen (1954); Noel Corngold (1954); Daniel Kleppner (1959); Howard Berg (1964); David J. Wineland (1971); Richard R. Freeman (1973); Geoffrey L. Greene (1977); Blayne Heckel (1981)
- Other notable students: Sunney Chan (post doc)

Norman Foster Ramsey Jr. (August 27, 1915 – November 4, 2011) was an American physicist who was awarded the 1989 Nobel Prize in Physics for the invention of the separated oscillatory field method (see Ramsey interferometry), which had important applications in the construction of atomic clocks. A physics professor at Harvard University for most of his career, Ramsey also held several posts with such government and international agencies as NATO and the United States Atomic Energy Commission. Among his other accomplishments are helping to found the United States Department of Energy's Brookhaven National Laboratory and Fermilab.

== Early life ==
Norman Foster Ramsey Jr. was born in Washington, D.C., on August 27, 1915, to Minna Bauer Ramsey and Norman Foster Ramsey. His mother was the daughter of German immigrants and an instructor at the University of Kansas. His father, who was of Scottish descent, was a 1905 graduate of the United States Military Academy at West Point and an officer in the Ordnance Department who rose to the rank of brigadier general during World War II, commanding the Rock Island Arsenal. He was raised as an Army brat, frequently moving from post to post, and lived in France for a time when his father was Liaison Officer with the Direction d'Artillerie and Assistant Military Attaché. This allowed him to skip a couple of grades along the way, so that he graduated from Leavenworth High School in Leavenworth, Kansas, at the age of 15.

Ramsey's parents hoped that he would go to West Point, but at 15, he was too young to be admitted. He was awarded a scholarship to the University of Kansas, but in 1930 his father was posted to Governors Island, New York. Ramsey therefore entered Columbia University in 1931 and began studying engineering. He became interested in mathematics and switched to this as his academic major. By the time he received his BA from Columbia in 1935, he had become interested in physics. Columbia awarded him a Kellett Fellowship to Cambridge University, where he studied physics at Cavendish Laboratory under Lord Rutherford and Maurice Goldhaber, and encountered notable physicists, including Edward Appleton, Max Born, Edward Bullard, James Chadwick, John Cockcroft, Paul Dirac, Arthur Eddington, Ralph Fowler, Mark Oliphant and J. J. Thomson. At Cambridge, he took the tripos in order to study quantum mechanics, which had not been covered at Columbia, resulting in being awarded a second BA degree by Cambridge.

A term paper Ramsey wrote for Goldhaber on magnetic moments caused him to read recent papers on the subject by Isidor Isaac Rabi, and this stimulated an interest in molecular beams and in doing research for a PhD under Rabi at Columbia. Soon after Ramsey arrived at Columbia, Rabi invented molecular-beam resonance spectroscopy, for which he was awarded the Nobel Prize in Physics in 1944. Ramsey was part of Rabi's team that also included Jerome Kellogg, Polykarp Kusch, Sidney Millman and Jerrold Zacharias. Ramsey worked with them on the first experiments making use of the new technique and shared with Rabi and Zacharias in the discovery that the deuteron was a magnetic quadrupole. This meant that the atomic nucleus was not spherical, as had been thought. He received his PhD in physics from Columbia in 1940 and became a fellow at the Carnegie Institution in Washington, D.C., where he studied neutron–proton and proton–helium scattering.

== World War II ==
=== MIT Radiation Laboratory ===
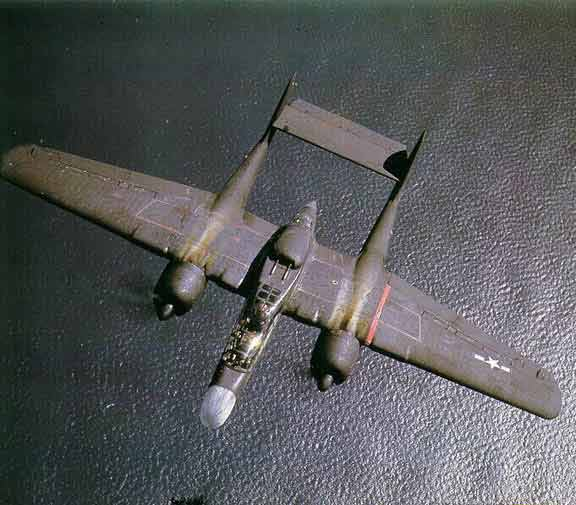
The Northrop P-61 Black Widow night fighter was specifically designed to take advantage of the new radar.

In 1940, he married Elinor Jameson of Brooklyn, New York, and accepted a teaching position at the University of Illinois at Urbana–Champaign. The two expected to spend the rest of their lives there, but World War II intervened. In September 1940 the British Tizard Mission brought a number of new technologies to the United States, including a cavity magnetron, a high-powered device that generates microwaves using the interaction of a stream of electrons with a magnetic field, which promised to revolutionize radar. Alfred Lee Loomis of the National Defense Research Committee established the Radiation Laboratory at the Massachusetts Institute of Technology to develop this technology. Ramsey was one of the scientists recruited by Rabi for this work.

Initially, Ramsey was in Rabi's magnetron group. When Rabi became a division head, Ramsey became the group leader. The role of the group was to develop the magnetron to permit a reduction in wavelength from 150 centimetres (59 in) to 10 centimetres (3.9 in), and then to 3 centimetres (1.2 in) or X band. Microwave radar promised to be small, lighter and more efficient than older types. Ramsey's group started with the design produced by Oliphant's team in Britain and attempted to improve it. The Radiation Laboratory produced the designs, which were prototyped by Raytheon, and then tested by the laboratory. In June 1941, Ramsey travelled to Britain, where he met with Oliphant, and the two exchanged ideas. He brought back some British components, which were incorporated into the final design. A night fighter aircraft, the Northrop P-61 Black Widow, was designed around the new radar. Ramsey returned to Washington in late 1942 as an adviser on the use of the new 3 cm microwave radar sets that were now coming into service, working for Edward L. Bowles in the office of the Secretary of War, Henry L. Stimson.

=== Manhattan Project ===
In 1943, Ramsey was approached by Robert Oppenheimer and Robert Bacher, who asked him to join the Manhattan Project. Ramsey agreed to do so, but the intervention of the project director, Brigadier General Leslie R. Groves Jr., was necessary in order to prise him away from the Secretary of War's office. A compromise was agreed to, whereby Ramsey remained on the payroll of the Secretary of War and was merely seconded to the Manhattan Project. In October 1943, Group E-7 of the Ordnance Division was created at the Los Alamos Laboratory with Ramsey as group leader, with the task of integrating the design and delivery of the nuclear weapons being built by the laboratory.

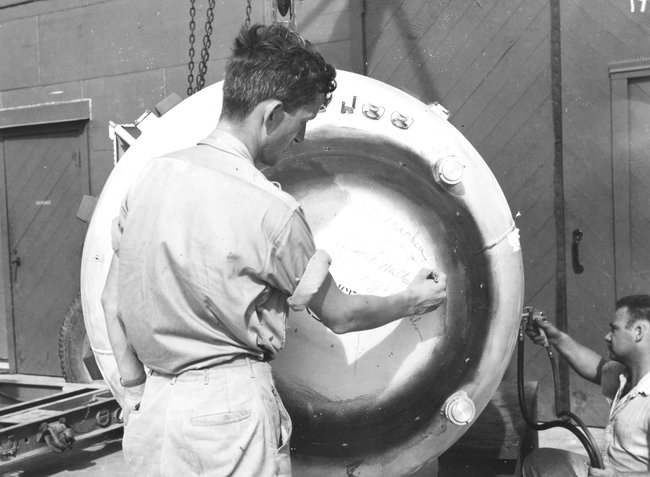
Ramsey signs the Fat Man used at Nagasaki.

The first thing he had to do was determine the characteristics of the aircraft that would be used. There were only two Allied aircraft large enough: the British Avro Lancaster and the US Boeing B-29 Superfortress. The United States Army Air Forces (USAAF) wanted to use the B-29 if at all possible, even though it required substantial modification. Ramsey supervised the test drop program, which began at Dahlgren, Virginia, in August 1943, before moving to Muroc Dry Lake, California, in March 1944. Mock-ups of Thin Man and Fat Man bombs were dropped and tracked by an SCR-584 ground-based radar set of the kind that Ramsey had helped develop at the Radiation laboratory. Numerous problems were discovered with the bombs and the aircraft modifications, and corrected.

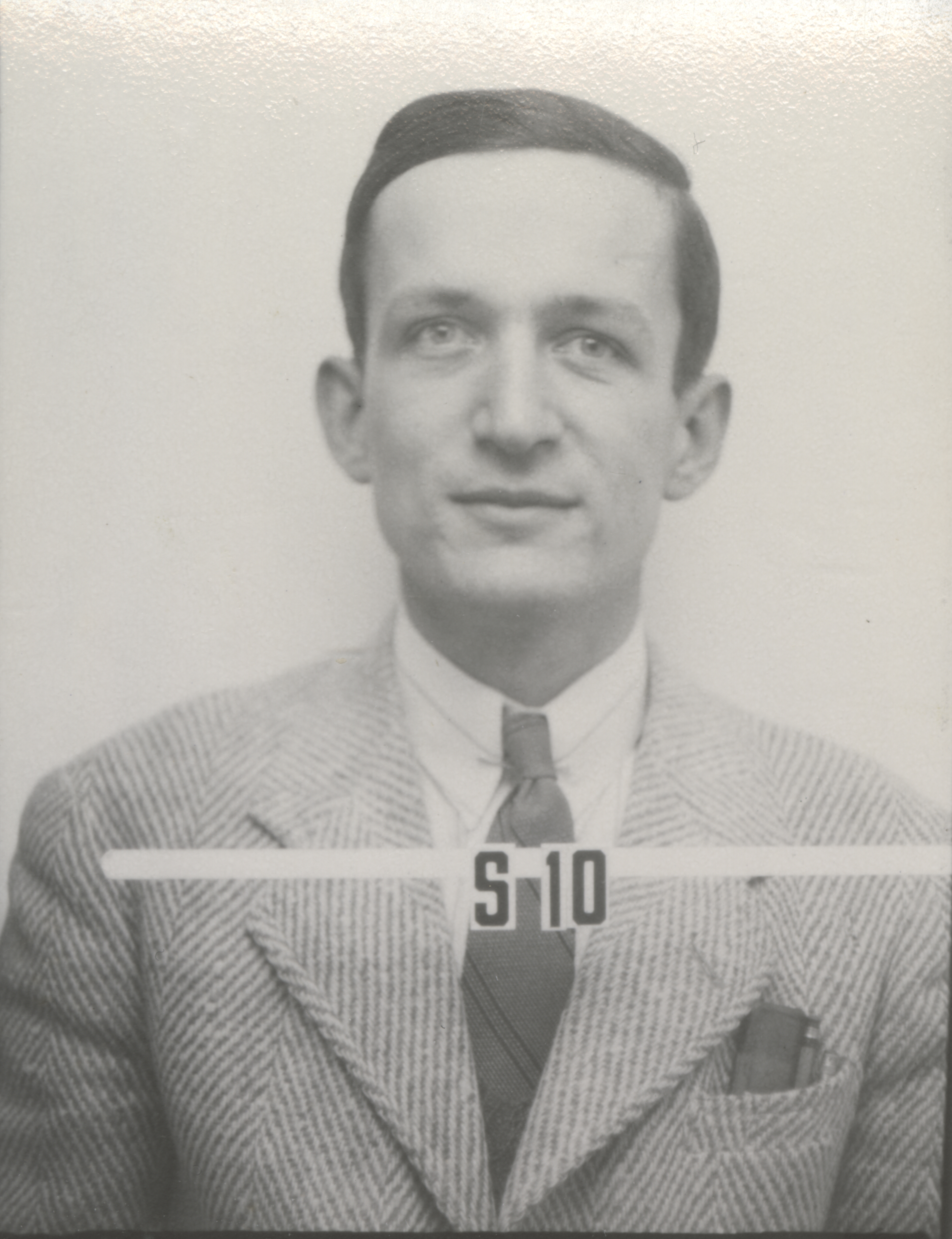
Ramsey's Los Alamos badge

Plans for the delivery of the weapons in combat were assigned to the Weapons Committee, which was chaired by Ramsey and answerable to Captain William S. Parsons. Ramsey drew up tables of organization and equipment for the Project Alberta detachment that would accompany the USAAF's 509th Composite Group to Tinian. Ramsey briefed the 509th's commander, Lieutenant Colonel Paul W. Tibbets, on the nature of the mission when the latter assumed command of the 509th. Ramsey went to Tinian with the Project Alberta detachment as Parsons's scientific and technical deputy. He was involved in the assembly of the Fat Man bomb and relayed Parsons's message indicating the success of the bombing of Hiroshima to Groves in Washington, D.C.

== Research ==
At the end of the war, Ramsey returned to Columbia as a professor and research scientist. Rabi and Ramsey picked up where they had left off before the war with their molecular-beam experiments. Ramsey and his first graduate student, William Nierenberg, measured various nuclear magnetic dipole and electric quadrupole moments. With Rabi, he helped establish the Brookhaven National Laboratory on Long Island. In 1946, he became the first head of the Physics Department there. His time there was brief, for in 1947, he joined the physics faculty at Harvard University, where he would remain for the next 40 years, except for brief visiting professorships at Middlebury College, Oxford University, Mt. Holyoke College and the University of Virginia. During the 1950s, he was the first science adviser to NATO and initiated a series of fellowships, grants and summer school programs to train European scientists.

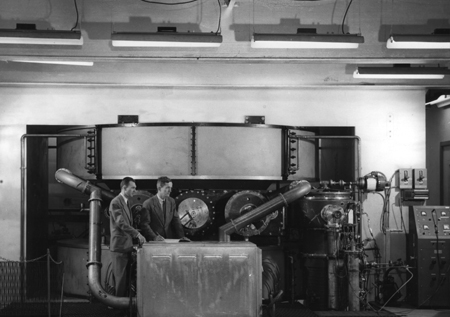
The Harvard cyclotron during construction in 1948. Shown are Ramsey (left) and Lee Davenport (right).

Ramsey's research in the immediate post-war years looked at measuring fundamental properties of atoms and molecules by use of molecular beams. On moving to Harvard, his objective was to carry out accurate molecular-beam magnetic-resonance experiments, based on the techniques developed by Rabi. However, the accuracy of the measurements depended on the uniformity of the magnetic field, and Ramsey found that it was difficult to create sufficiently uniform magnetic fields. He developed the separated oscillatory field method in 1949 as a means of achieving the accuracy he wanted.

Ramsey and his PhD student Daniel Kleppner developed the atomic-hydrogen maser, looking to increase the accuracy with which the hyperfine separations of atomic hydrogen, deuterium and tritium could be measured, as well as to investigate how much the hyperfine structure was affected by external magnetic and electric fields. He also participated in developing an extremely stable clock based on a hydrogen maser. From 1967 until 2019, the second has been defined based on 9,192,631,770 Hz hyperfine transition of a cesium-133 atom; the atomic clock which is used to set this standard is an application of Ramsey's work. He was awarded the Nobel Prize in Physics in 1989 "for the invention of the separated oscillatory fields method and its use in the hydrogen maser and other atomic clocks". The Prize was shared with Hans Georg Dehmelt and Wolfgang Paul.

In collaboration with the Institut Laue–Langevin, Ramsey also worked on applying similar methods to beams of neutrons, measuring the neutron magnetic moment and finding a limit to its electric dipole moment. As president of the Universities Research Association during the 1960s he was involved in the design and construction of the Fermilab in Batavia, Illinois. He also headed a 1982 National Research Council committee that concluded that, contrary to the findings of the House of Representatives Select Committee on Assassinations, acoustic evidence did not indicate the presence of a second gunman's involvement in the assassination of President John F. Kennedy.

== Later life ==
Ramsey eventually became the Eugene Higgins professor of physics at Harvard and retired in 1986. However, he remained active in physics, spending a year as a research fellow at the Joint Institute for Laboratory Astrophysics (JILA) at the University of Colorado. He also continued visiting professorships at the University of Chicago, Williams College and the University of Michigan. In addition to the Nobel Prize in Physics, Ramsey received a number of awards, including the Ernest Orlando Lawrence Award in 1960, Davisson–Germer Prize in 1974, the IEEE Medal of Honor in 1984, the Rabi Prize in 1985, the Rumford Premium Prize in 1985, the Compton Medal in 1986, and the Oersted Medal and the National Medal of Science in 1988. In 1990, Ramsey received the Golden Plate Award of the American Academy of Achievement. He was an elected member of the American Academy of Arts and Sciences, the United States National Academy of Sciences, and the American Philosophical Society. In 2004, he signed a letter along with 47 other Nobel laureates endorsing John Kerry for President of the United States as someone who would "restore science to its appropriate place in government".

His first wife, Elinor, died in 1983, after which he married Ellie Welch of Brookline, Massachusetts. Ramsey died on November 4, 2011. He was survived by his wife Ellie, his four daughters from his first marriage, and his stepdaughter and stepson from his second marriage.

== Bibliography ==
- Ramsey, N. F.; Birge, R. W.; Kruse, U. E.. "Proton–Proton Scattering at 105 MeV and 75 MeV", Harvard University, United States Department of Energy (through predecessor agency the United States Atomic Energy Commission), (January 31, 1951).
- Ramsey, N. F.; Cone, A. A.; Chen, K. W.; Dunning, J. R. Jr.; Hartwig, G.; Walker, J. K.; Wilson, R. "Inelastic Scattering Of Electrons By Protons", Department of Physics at Harvard University, United States Department of Energy (through predecessor agency the United States Atomic Energy Commission), (December 1966).
- Greene, G. L.; Ramsey, N. F.; Mampe, W.; Pendlebury, J. M.; Smith, K.; Dress, W. B.; Miller, P. D.; Perrin, P. "Determination of the Neutron Magnetic Moment", Oak Ridge National Laboratory, Harvard University, Institut Laue–Langevin, Astronomy Centre of Sussex University, United States Department of Energy, (June 1981).
- Ramsey, N. F. "Molecular Beams", Oxford University Press (First edition 1956, Reprinted 1986).
