= Jens H. Gundlach =

German physicist (born 1961)

Jens Horst Gundlach (born 1961 in Würzburg) is a German physicist.

== Biography ==
His father was Gerd Gundlach, a biochemistry professor in Gießen. Jens Gundlach studied physics at the University of Mainz with Vordiplom (intermediate Diplom) in 1982 and Diplom in 1986. After the Vordiplom he studied for a year in Seattle at the University of Washington. He received his doctorate there in 1990 under the supervision of Kurt Snover (1943–2021) with a dissertation entitled Shapes of excited rotating medium-mass nuclei determined from giant dipole resonance decays. As a postdoc he was a research associate under the supervision of Eric Adelberger and Blayne Heckel at the University of Washington from 1990 to 1993. As a member of the Eöt-Wash Group, named in honor of Loránd Eötvös, Gundlach did research in experimental gravitational physics. With his colleagues he searched for the confirmation or refutation of a hypothetical fifth force, which might cause deviations from Newtonian gravity, depend on material properties and violate the equivalence principle. At the University of Washington, Gundlach was from 1993 to 1998 an assistant professor and from 1998 to 2004 an associate professor with promotion to full professor in 2004. He has been a member of the University of Washington's Center for Experimental Nuclear Physics and Astrophysics since its founding in 2000.

In the Eöt-Wash Group, Gundlach built torsion balances to test the equivalence principle, test Newton's law of gravity at short distances and measure the strength of gravity. The latter measurement consisted of an instrument that held a thin plate by a tungsten filament inside a high vacuum. This torsion balance was mounted on a turntable, inside an outer turntable with two spherical field masses facing each other. Compared to previous experiments with dumbbell-shaped pendulums on a torsion wire, the Gundlach's measurement was not limited by how well the mass distribution of the pendulum was known. Additionally, the inner turntable was rotated in feedback exactly so that the torsion thread was not twisted, despite the gravitational deceleration and acceleration by the masses on the outer turntable. The inner turntable's regulated rotation eliminated uncertainties from the inelasticity of the torsion thread which had plagued previous measurements. In another experiment, Gundlach and his colleagues conducted the first test of the $\frac {1}{r^2}$ form of the gravitational force down to values of $r$ in the 50 micron range. In this range, according to various large extradimensional theories by Nima Arkani-Hamed and other string theorists, possibilities begin to occur for discrepancies caused by 4D gravity (or even higher dimensional gravitational theories) without a cosmological constant.

In 2000 Gundlach succeeded in measuring the gravitational constant $G$ with a new torsion balance technique that he had developed. Since 2006, the CODATA value for $G$ is mostly based on this measurement.

He is a member of LIGO and LISA (Laser Interferometer Space Antenna), the planned satellite-based laser interferometric gravitational-wave detector, and has performed ultra-weak force measurements with the laser interferometers for gravitational-wave detection.

Since about 2002 Gundlach has done research in biophysics. In his bio-research he has pioneered nanopore sequencing technology. In 2008 his group demonstrated that a mutated version of the biological nanopore MspA could pass DNA and that it had the desired shape to identify individual nucleotides in single-stranded DNA. In 2012 The Gundlach group demonstrated functional nanopore sequencing using MspA and an enzyme to control the passage of the DNA through the pore. His group is now using their nanopore technology as a single-molecule tool to study how enzymes process along DNA or RNA.

Gundlach received in 2001 the Francis M. Pipkin Award of the American Physical Society (APS). In 2009 he was elected a fellow of the APS in recognition of his "contributions to precision mechanical measurements and our quantitative understanding of the strength of gravity". In 2021 he received, jointly with Eric Adelberger and Blayne Heckel, the Breakthrough Prize in Fundamental Physics for "precision fundamental measurements that test our understanding of gravity, probe the nature of dark energy, and establish limits on couplings to dark matter."

He is married and has three children.

== Selected publications ==
- Su, Y.; Heckel, B. R.; Adelberger, E. G.; Gundlach, J. H.; Harris, M.; Smith, G. L.; Swanson, H. E. (1994). "New tests of the universality of free fall". Physical Review D. 50 (6): 3614–3636. Bibcode:1994PhRvD..50.3614S. doi:10.1103/PhysRevD.50.3614. PMID 10018005.
- Smith, G. L.; Hoyle, C. D.; Gundlach, J. H.; Adelberger, E. G.; Heckel, B. R.; Swanson, H. E. (1999). "Short-range tests of the equivalence principle". Physical Review D. 61 (2) 022001. arXiv:2405.10982. Bibcode:1999PhRvD..61b2001S. doi:10.1103/PhysRevD.61.022001.
- Baeßler, S.; Heckel, B. R.; Adelberger, E. G.; Gundlach, J. H.; Schmidt, U.; Swanson, H. E. (1999). "Improved Test of the Equivalence Principle for Gravitational Self-Energy". Physical Review Letters. 83 (18): 3585–3588. Bibcode:1999PhRvL..83.3585B. doi:10.1103/PhysRevLett.83.3585.
- Gundlach, Jens H.; Merkowitz, Stephen M. (2000). "Measurement of Newton's Constant Using a Torsion Balance with Angular Acceleration Feedback". Physical Review Letters. 85 (14): 2869–2872. arXiv:gr-qc/0006043. Bibcode:2000PhRvL..85.2869G. doi:10.1103/PhysRevLett.85.2869. PMID 11005956. S2CID 15206636.
- Hoyle, C. D.; Schmidt, U.; Heckel, B. R.; Adelberger, E. G.; Gundlach, J. H.; Kapner, D. J.; Swanson, H. E. (2001). "Submillimeter Test of the Gravitational Inverse-Square Law: A Search for "Large" Extra Dimensions". Physical Review Letters. 86 (8): 1418–1421. arXiv:hep-ph/0011014. Bibcode:2001PhRvL..86.1418H. doi:10.1103/PhysRevLett.86.1418. PMID 11290157. S2CID 36937560. (over 550 citations)
- Hoyle, C. D.; Kapner, D. J.; Heckel, B. R.; Adelberger, E. G.; Gundlach, J. H.; Schmidt, U.; Swanson, H. E. (2004). "Submillimeter tests of the gravitational inverse-square law". Physical Review D. 70 (4) 042004. arXiv:hep-ph/0405262. Bibcode:2004PhRvD..70d2004H. doi:10.1103/PhysRevD.70.042004. S2CID 15002909.
- Gundlach, J. H.; Schlamminger, S.; Spitzer, C. D.; Choi, K.-Y.; Woodahl, B. A.; Coy, J. J.; Fischbach, E. (2007). "Laboratory Test of Newton's Second Law for Small Accelerations". Physical Review Letters. 98 (15) 150801. Bibcode:2007PhRvL..98o0801G. doi:10.1103/PhysRevLett.98.150801. PMID 17501332.
- Butler, Tom Z.; Pavlenok, Mikhail; Derrington, Ian M.; Niederweis, Michael; Gundlach, Jens H. (2008). "Single-molecule DNA detection with an engineered MspA protein nanopore". Proceedings of the National Academy of Sciences. 105 (52): 20647–20652. Bibcode:2008PNAS..10520647B. doi:10.1073/pnas.0807514106. PMC 2634888. PMID 19098105. (over 500 citations)
- Schlamminger, S.; Choi, K.-Y.; Wagner, T. A.; Gundlach, J. H.; Adelberger, E. G. (2008). "Test of the Equivalence Principle Using a Rotating Torsion Balance". Physical Review Letters. 100 (4) 041101. arXiv:0712.0607. Bibcode:2008PhRvL.100d1101S. doi:10.1103/PhysRevLett.100.041101. PMID 18352252. S2CID 18653407. (over 700 citations)
- Pollack, S. E.; Schlamminger, S.; Gundlach, J. H. (2008). "Temporal Extent of Surface Potentials between Closely Spaced Metals". Physical Review Letters. 101 (7) 071101. arXiv:0806.4765. Bibcode:2008PhRvL.101g1101P. doi:10.1103/PhysRevLett.101.071101. PMID 18764520. S2CID 35364537.
- Butler, Tom Z.; Pavlenok, Mikhail; Derrington, Ian M.; Niederweis, Michael; Gundlach, Jens H. (2008). "Single-molecule DNA detection with an engineered MspA protein nanopore". Proceedings of the National Academy of Sciences. 105 (52): 20647–20652. Bibcode:2008PNAS..10520647B. doi:10.1073/pnas.0807514106. PMC 2634888. PMID 19098105. (over 500 citations)
- Derrington, Ian M.; Butler, Tom Z.; Collins, Marcus D.; Manrao, Elizabeth; Pavlenok, Mikhail; Niederweis, Michael; Gundlach, Jens H. (2010). "Nanopore DNA sequencing with MspA". Proceedings of the National Academy of Sciences. 107 (37): 16060–16065. Bibcode:2010PNAS..10716060D. doi:10.1073/pnas.1001831107. PMC 2941267. PMID 20798343. (over 550 citations)
- Manrao, Elizabeth A.; Derrington, Ian M.; Laszlo, Andrew H.; Langford, Kyle W.; Hopper, Matthew K.; Gillgren, Nathaniel; Pavlenok, Mikhail; Niederweis, Michael; Gundlach, Jens H. (2012). "Reading DNA at single-nucleotide resolution with a mutant MspA nanopore and phi29 DNA polymerase". Nature Biotechnology. 30 (4): 349–353. doi:10.1038/nbt.2171. PMC 3757088. PMID 22446694.
- Laszlo, Andrew H.; Derrington, Ian M.; Brinkerhoff, Henry; Langford, Kyle W.; Nova, Ian C.; Samson, Jenny Mae; Bartlett, Joshua J.; Pavlenok, Mikhail; Gundlach, Jens H. (2013). "Detection and mapping of 5-methylcytosine and 5-hydroxymethylcytosine with nanopore MspA". Proceedings of the National Academy of Sciences. 110 (47): 18904–18909. Bibcode:2013PNAS..11018904L. doi:10.1073/pnas.1310240110. PMC 3839702. PMID 24167255.
- Derrington Laszlo, Ian M.; Craig, Jonathan M.; Stava, Eric; Laszlo, Andrew H.; Ross, Brian C.; Brinkerhoff, Henry; Tickman, Benjamin I.; Ronaghi, Mostafa; Mandell, Jeffrey G.; Gunderson, Kevin L.; Gundlach, Jens H. (2015). "Subangstrom single-molecule measurements of motor proteins using a nanopore". Nature Biotechnology. 10 (47): 1073–1075. doi:10.1038/nbt.3357. PMC 4915380. PMID 26414351.
- Shaw, E. A.; Ross, M. P.; Hagedorn, C. A.; Adelberger, E. G.; Gundlach, J. H. (2022). "Torsion-balance search for ultra low-mass bosonic dark matter". Physical Review D. 105 (4) 042007. arXiv:2109.08822. Bibcode:2022PhRvD.105d2007S. doi:10.1103/PhysRevD.105.042007. S2CID 237571682.
