= Geoffrey L. Greene =

American neutron physicist

- Education: Swarthmore College (BA); Harvard University (PhD)
- Scientific career
- Institutions: Yale University; National Institute of Standards and Technology; Oak Ridge National Laboratory; University of Tennessee
- Thesis: A Measurement of the Magnetic Moment of the Neutron (1974)
- Doctoral advisor: Norman Ramsey

Geoffrey L. Greene is an American neutron physicist. Greene received his bachelor's degree from Swarthmore College in 1971 and his doctorate from Harvard University in 1974 with Norman Ramsey, a Nobel laureate in physics. There he worked on low-energy (cold) neutrons, which were then first available in intense beams. As a post-doctoral fellow he was at the Rutherford Appleton Laboratory and the Institut Laue-Langevin. He was an assistant professor at Yale University and then at the National Institute of Standards and Technology (NIST). He has held various management positions at Los Alamos National Laboratory. Since 2002, he is a professor at the University of Tennessee and Oak Ridge National Laboratory.

His research deals with neutron physics and use of cold neutrons in the determination of fundamental constants and for the study of fundamental nuclear processes. He had a leading role in determining fundamental neutron properties such as lifetime, mass, magnetic moment and various experiments investigating possible symmetry breaking in nuclear reactions.

He was elected a Fellow of the American Physical Society in 1995 and has served on the Nuclear Science Advisory Committee and the APS Division of Nuclear Physics. In 2021, he received the Tom W. Bonner Prize in Nuclear Physics “for foundational work establishing the field of fundamental neutron physics in the U.S., for developing experimental techniques for in-beam measurements of the neutron lifetime and other experiments and for realizing a facility for the next generation of fundamental neutron physics measurements.”
