= Noel Corngold =

American physicist (1929–2022)

- Born: Noel Robert David Corngold; 1929; Brooklyn, New York
- Died: January 23, 2022 (aged 92–93)
- Education: Columbia University (BA); Harvard University (PhD)
- Scientific career
- Fields: Nuclear physics
- Workplaces: Brookhaven National Laboratory; California Institute of Technology
- Doctoral advisor: Norman Foster Ramsey Jr.
- Notable students: Robert W. Conn; James Duderstadt; George E. Apostolakis

Noel Robert David Corngold (1929 – January 23, 2022) was an American physicist. He was a professor of physics at the California Institute of Technology.

== Biography ==
Corngold was born in Brooklyn in 1929. He was bedridden for a year prior to college with rheumatic fever and used that sabbatical to study physics, calculus and chess before receiving his B.A. magna cum laude from Columbia College in 1950. At Columbia, he was a student of Isidor Isaac Rabi. After graduation, he received his PhD from Harvard University, where he was supervised by Nobel laureate Norman Foster Ramsey Jr. His doctoral thesis was based on his experimental work conducted in the Brookhaven National Laboratory.

Corngold stayed on as a reactor physics theorist at Brookhaven for 12 years. In 1966, he was recruited by California Institute of Technology professor Harold Lurie to start a program in nuclear energy and received a professorship in applied science. He was also named a fellow of the American Nuclear Society. His early research focused on the mathematical problems in the field of nuclear reactor physics and his later research focused on the qualities of pure electron plasmas. He was also known for studying the behavior of neutrons in reactors.

Corngold joined Caltech's applied physics department in the 1970s and remained a professor until his retirement. He received the Arthur Holly Compton Award for "outstanding contribution to education in the field of science and engineering" and the Eugene P. Wigner Award for "outstanding contributions toward the advancement in the field of nuclear reactor physics" from the American Nuclear Society. His students at Caltech included Robert W. Conn, former president and CEO of the Kavli Foundation and James Duderstadt, former president of the University of Michigan.

Corngold died on January 23, 2022.
