= Blayne Heckel =

American experimental physicist

Blayne Ryan Heckel (born March 20, 1953) is an American experimental physicist whose research involved precision measurements in atomic physics and gravitational physics. He is a professor emeritus at the University of Washington in Seattle.

== Education and career ==
At Harvard University he graduated with an A.B. in 1975 and a Ph.D. in 1981. His doctoral dissertation was supervised by Norman Ramsey. Heckel became an assistant professor in 1983, an associate professor in 1987, and a full professor in 1991 at the University of Washington, where he was temporarily head of the physics department. Heckel founded there with Eric Adelberger in 1986 a group for experimental gravitational physics (Eöt-Wash Group), which Jens H. Gundlach joined in 1990. They further developed torsion balances in the style of Eötvös and used them to study the possible deviation of the gravitational force from Newton's $F = G \frac{m_1 m_2}{r^2}$ law at small distances $r$ (up to 50 micrometers). The Eöt-Wash group searched for possible new fundamental forces involving a fifth force, large extra dimensions, or the effects of dark matter and dark energy, as well as possible violations of the equivalence principle at small distances. Heckel and his colleagues also used the torsion balance to test Lorentz invariance with polarized electrons and to look for new spin-dependent forces.

In the 1980s his research dealt with experimental atomic physics, including searches for violations of parity and violation of time reversal invariance, by means of measuring upper limits for the electric dipole moment of atoms such as ^{199}Hg. He worked with his doctoral advisor Norman Ramsey, among others.

Heckel and his colleagues also measured the coupling constants of the weak interaction of neutrons with nucleons. His team used beams of cold polarized neutrons from the National Institute of Standards and Technology (NIST) reactor to bombard a liquid helium target, measuring the parity-violating spin of the beam polarization.

In 2012 he was elected a member of the Washington State Academy of Sciences (WSAS). In 2021 he was awarded, jointly with Eric Adelberger and Jens H. Gundlach, the Breakthrough Prize in Fundamental Physics for "precision fundamental measurements that test our understanding of gravity, probe the nature of dark energy, and establish limits on couplings to dark matter."

His doctoral students include Christopher Stubbs.

== Selected publications ==
- Adelberger, E. G.; Heckel, B. R.; Stubbs, C. W.; Rogers, W. F. (1991). "Searches for New Macroscopic Forces". Annual Review of Nuclear and Particle Science. 41 (41): 269–320. Bibcode:1991ARNPS..41..269A. doi:10.1146/annurev.ns.41.120191.001413.
- Venema, B. J.; Majumder, P. K.; Lamoreaux, S. K.; Heckel, B. R.; Fortson, E. N. (1992). "Search for a coupling of the Earth's gravitational field to nuclear spins in atomic mercury". Physical Review Letters. 68 (2): 135–138. Bibcode:1992PhRvL..68..135V. doi:10.1103/PhysRevLett.68.135. PMID 10045544.
- Su, Y.; Heckel, B. R.; Adelberger, E. G.; Gundlach, J. H.; Harris, M.; Smith, G. L.; Swanson, H. E. (1994). "New tests of the universality of free fall". Physical Review D. 50 (6): 3614–3636. Bibcode:1994PhRvD..50.3614S. doi:10.1103/PhysRevD.50.3614. PMID 10018005.
- Smith, G. L.; Hoyle, C. D.; Gundlach, J. H.; Adelberger, E. G.; Heckel, B. R.; Swanson, H. E. (1999). "Short-range tests of the equivalence principle". Physical Review D. 61 (2) 022001. arXiv:2405.10982. Bibcode:1999PhRvD..61b2001S. doi:10.1103/PhysRevD.61.022001.
- Baeßler, S.; Heckel, B. R.; Adelberger, E. G.; Gundlach, J. H.; Schmidt, U.; Swanson, H. E. (1999). "Improved Test of the Equivalence Principle for Gravitational Self-Energy". Physical Review Letters. 83 (18): 3585–3588. Bibcode:1999PhRvL..83.3585B. doi:10.1103/PhysRevLett.83.3585.
- Hoyle, C. D.; Schmidt, U.; Heckel, B. R.; Adelberger, E. G.; Gundlach, J. H.; Kapner, D. J.; Swanson, H. E. (2001). "Submillimeter Test of the Gravitational Inverse-Square Law: A Search for "Large" Extra Dimensions". Physical Review Letters. 86 (8): 1418–1421. arXiv:hep-ph/0011014. Bibcode:2001PhRvL..86.1418H. doi:10.1103/PhysRevLett.86.1418. PMID 11290157. S2CID 36937560.
- Adelberger, E.G.; Heckel, B.R.; Nelson, A.E. (2003). "Tests of the Gravitational Inverse-Square Law". Annual Review of Nuclear and Particle Science. 53: 77–121. arXiv:hep-ph/0307284. Bibcode:2003ARNPS..53...77A. doi:10.1146/annurev.nucl.53.041002.110503. S2CID 11174631. (over 900 citations)
- Kapner, D. J.; Cook, T. S.; Adelberger, E. G.; Gundlach, J. H.; Heckel, B. R.; Hoyle, C. D.; Swanson, H. E. (2007). "Tests of the Gravitational Inverse-Square Law below the Dark-Energy Length Scale". Physical Review Letters. 98 (2) 021101. arXiv:hep-ph/0611184. Bibcode:2007PhRvL..98b1101K. doi:10.1103/PhysRevLett.98.021101. PMID 17358595. S2CID 16379220.
- Adelberger, E.G.; Gundlach, J.H.; Heckel, B.R.; Hoedl, S.; Schlamminger, S. (2009). "Torsion balance experiments: A low-energy frontier of particle physics". Progress in Particle and Nuclear Physics. 62 (1): 102–134. Bibcode:2009PrPNP..62..102A. doi:10.1016/j.ppnp.2008.08.002.
- Griffith, W. C.; Swallows, M. D.; Loftus, T. H.; Romalis, M. V.; Heckel, B. R.; Fortson, E. N. (2009). "Improved Limit on the Permanent Electric Dipole Moment ofHg199". Physical Review Letters. 102 (10) 101601. arXiv:0901.2328. Bibcode:2009PhRvL.102j1601G. doi:10.1103/PhysRevLett.102.101601. PMID 19392101. S2CID 19015570.
- Terrano, W. A.; Adelberger, E. G.; Lee, J. G.; Heckel, B. R. (2015). "Short-Range, Spin-Dependent Interactions of Electrons: A Probe for Exotic Pseudo-Goldstone Bosons". Physical Review Letters. 115 (20) 201801. arXiv:1508.02463. Bibcode:2015PhRvL.115t1801T. doi:10.1103/PhysRevLett.115.201801. PMID 26613430. S2CID 34586270.
- Graner, B.; Chen, Y.; Lindahl, E. G.; Heckel, B. R. (2016). "Reduced Limit on the Permanent Electric Dipole Moment ofHg199". Physical Review Letters. 116 (16) 161601. arXiv:1601.04339. doi:10.1103/PhysRevLett.116.161601. PMID 27152789. S2CID 2230011.
- Lee, J. G.; Adelberger, E. G.; Cook, T. S.; Fleischer, S. M.; Heckel, B. R. (2020). "New Test of the Gravitational 1/ r ^{2} Law at Separations down to 52 μm". Physical Review Letters. 124 (10) 101101. arXiv:2002.11761. Bibcode:2020PhRvL.124j1101L. doi:10.1103/PhysRevLett.124.101101. PMID 32216404. S2CID 211532741.
