= Kavli (disambiguation) =

Kavli is a Norwegian food brand now owned by Kavli Trust.

Kavli may also refer to:

- Olav Kavli (1872–1958), Norwegian businessman who founded the Kavli company
- Fred Kavli (1927–2013), Norwegian-American businessman and philanthropist
  - Kavli Foundation (United States), supporting the advancement of science
    - Kavli Prize
- Kavli Medal, two medals awarded biennially by the Royal Society
- Arne Kavli (1878–1970), a Norwegian painter
- Guthorm Kavli (1917–1995), a Norwegian architect and art historian
- Karin Kavli (1906–1990), a Swedish film actress
