= Mount Aleutka =

Mountain in Alaska, United States

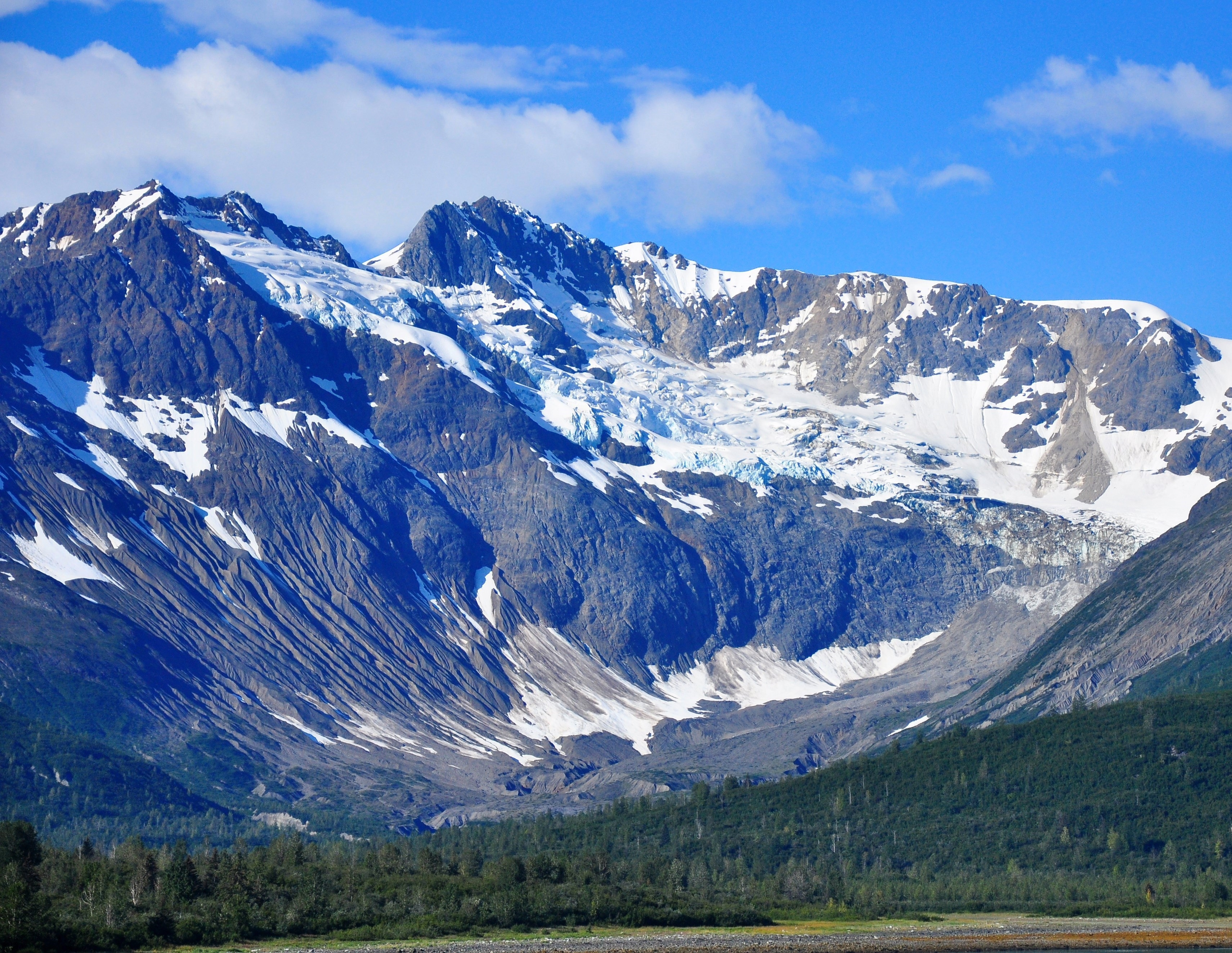
- Northeast aspect, with Scidmore Glacier

Highest point
- Elevation: 5,200 ft (1,585 m)
- Prominence: 2,500 ft (762 m)
- Isolation: 6.16 mi (9.91 km)
- Coordinates: 58°47′18″N 136°44′36″W

Geography
- Location within Alaska
- Interactive map of Mount Aleutka
- Country: United States
- State: Alaska
- Census Area: Hoonah–Angoon
- Protected area: Glacier Bay National Park
- Parent range: Saint Elias Mountains; Fairweather Range
- Topo map: USGS Mount Fairweather D-3

Climbing
- First ascent: June 1969

Mount Aleutka is a 5,200-foot (1,585 m) mountain summit in the US state of Alaska.

== Description ==
Mount Aleutka is located in the Fairweather Range of the Saint Elias Mountains. It is set within Glacier Bay National Park and Preserve and is situated 12 miles (19 km) east of Mount Abbe. Although modest in elevation, topographic relief is significant as the summit rises up from tidewater of Scidmore Bay in four miles (6.4 km) and the west face rises 3,200 feet (975 m) above the Reid Glacier in 1.5 mi (2.4 km). The first ascent of the summit was made in 1969 by Eric G. Adelberger, Audra Adelberger, John and Pati Letcher, who also named this peak after the Letcher's 25-foot sailboat, Aleutka, which transported them around Glacier Bay. The mountain's toponym has not been officially adopted by the U.S. Board on Geographic Names, and it will remain unofficial as long as the USGS policy of not adopting new toponyms in designated wilderness areas remains in effect.

== Climate ==
Based on the Köppen climate classification, Mount Aleutka is located in a marine subpolar climate zone, with long, cold, snowy winters, and cool summers. Weather systems coming off the Gulf of Alaska are forced upwards by the Saint Elias Mountains (orographic lift), causing heavy precipitation in the form of rainfall and snowfall. Winter temperatures can drop below 0 °F with wind chill factors below −10 °F. This climate supports the Reid, Scidmore, and Hugh Miller glaciers on the slopes of this peak. The months May through June offer the most favorable weather for viewing or climbing the peak.

== Gallery ==
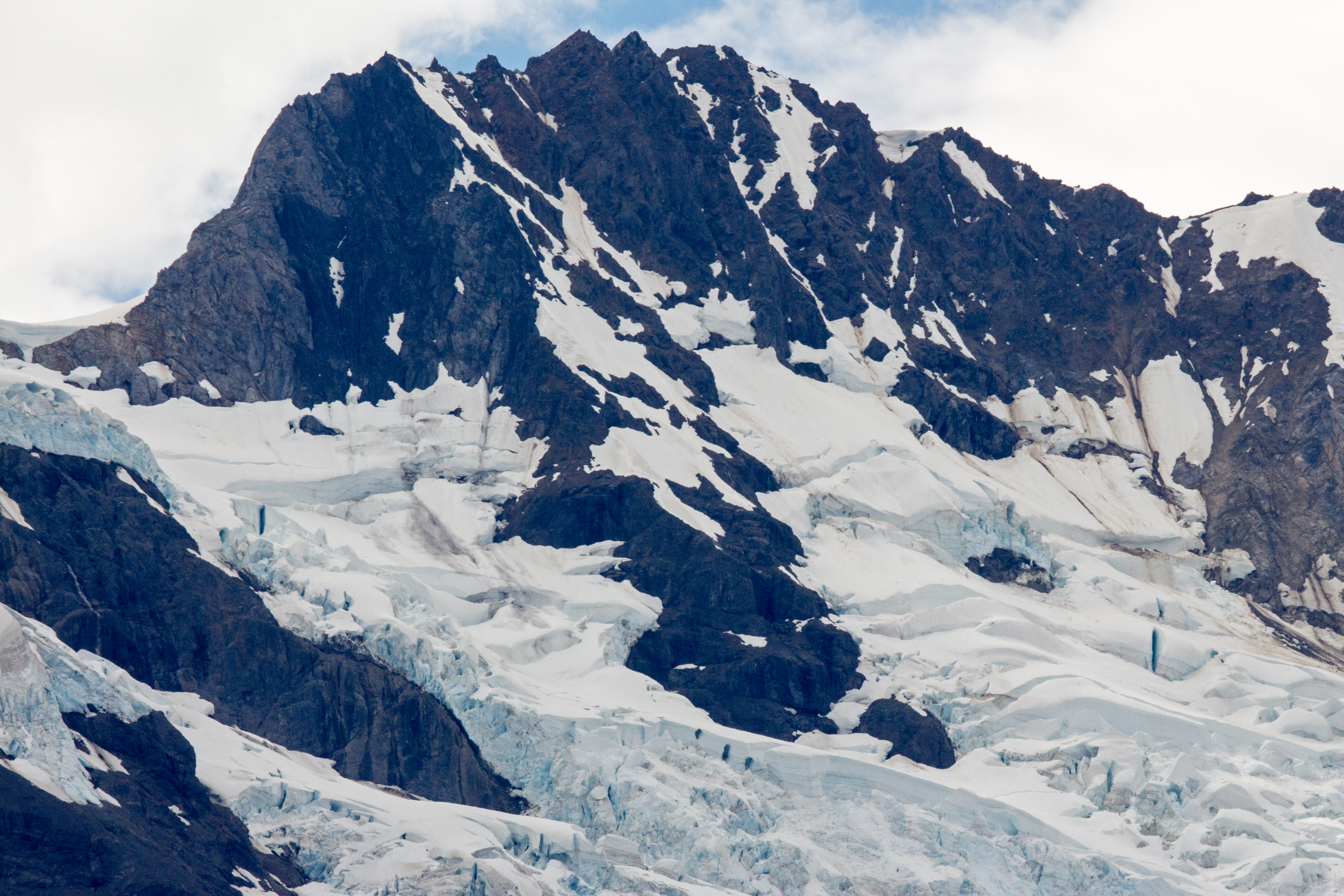
Summit from northeast

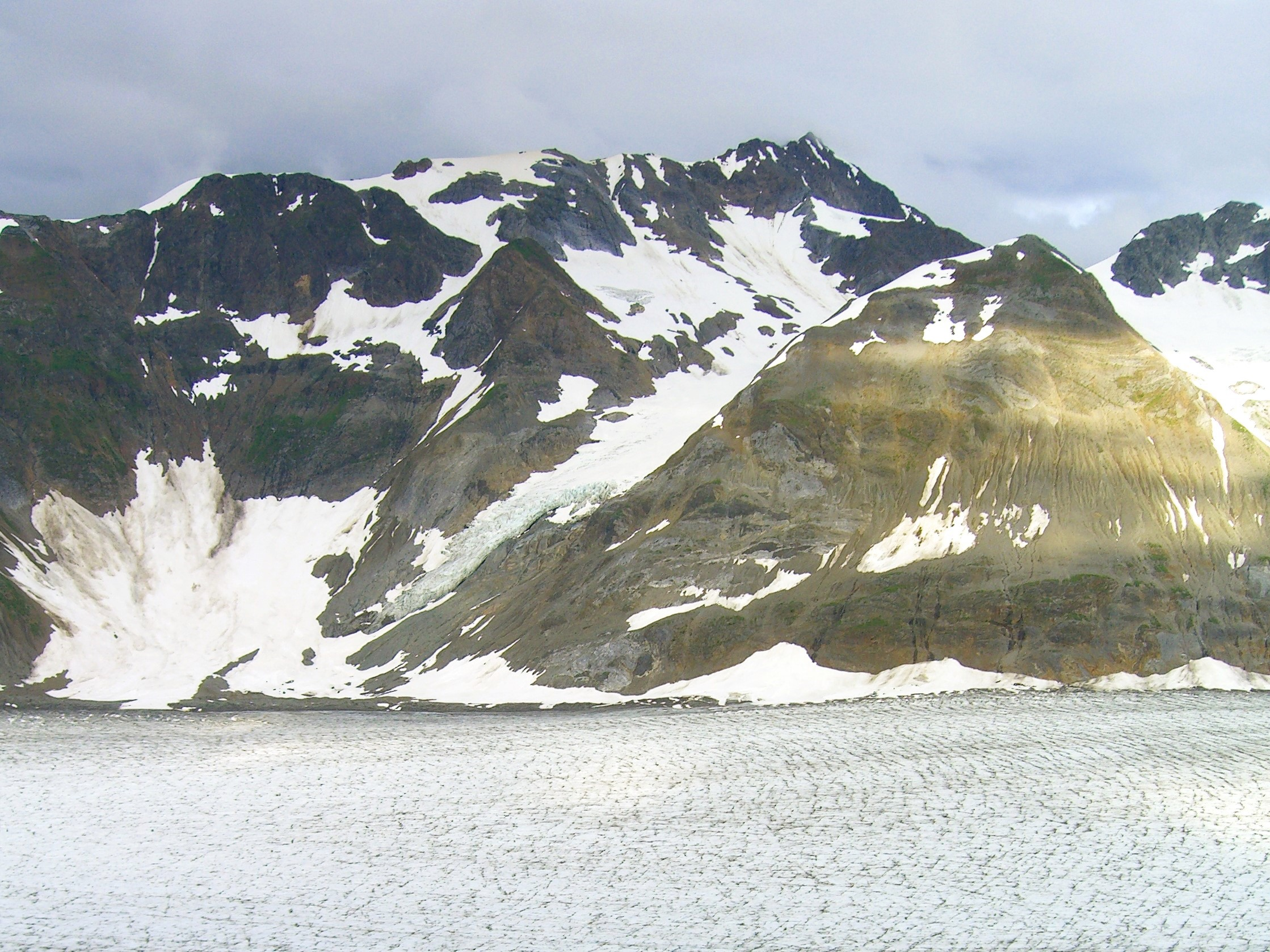
West aspect, above Reid Glacier

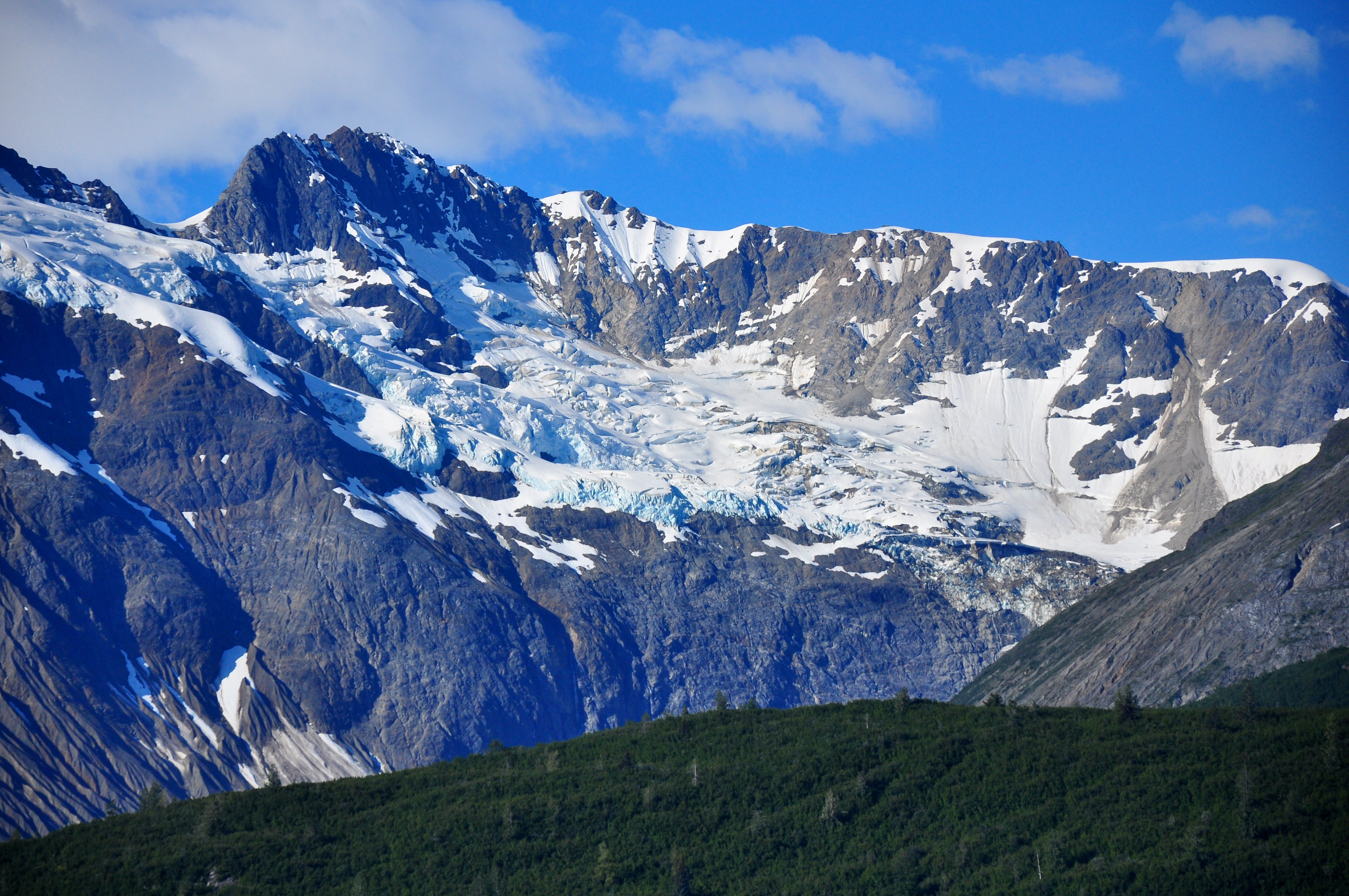
Summit (left) with Scidmore Glacier

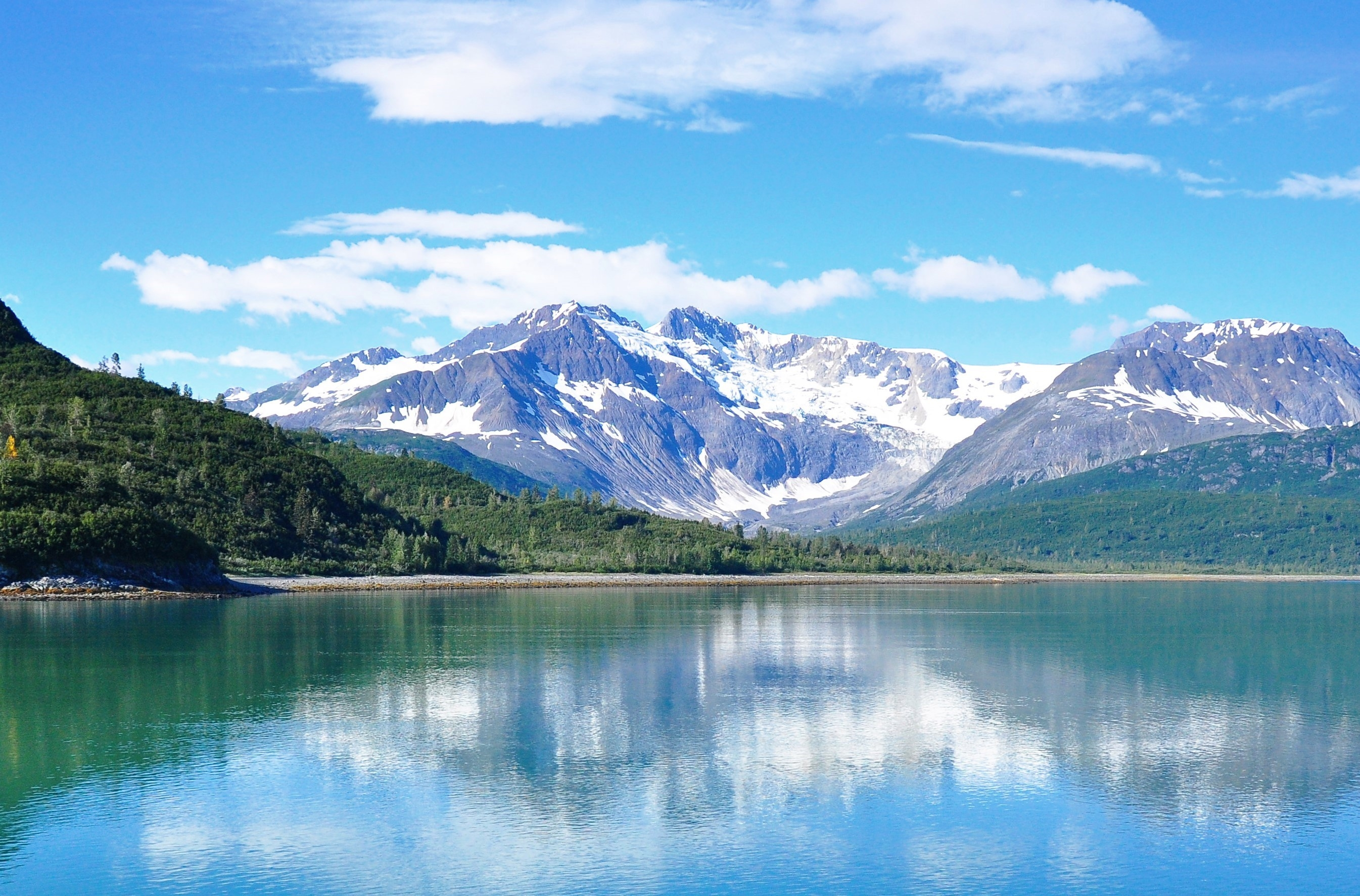
Mount Aleutka reflected in Glacier Bay

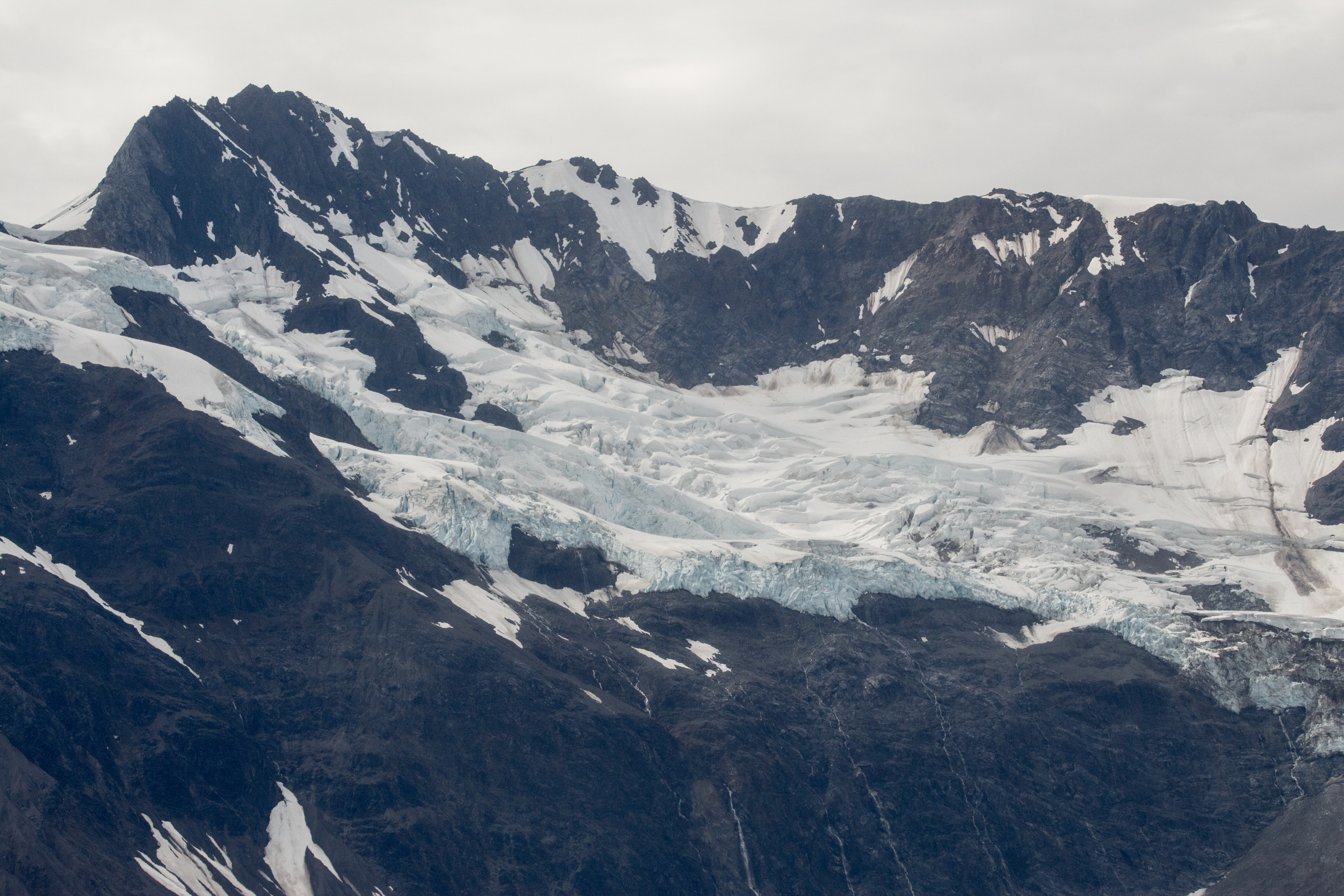
Summit (left) with Scidmore Glacier

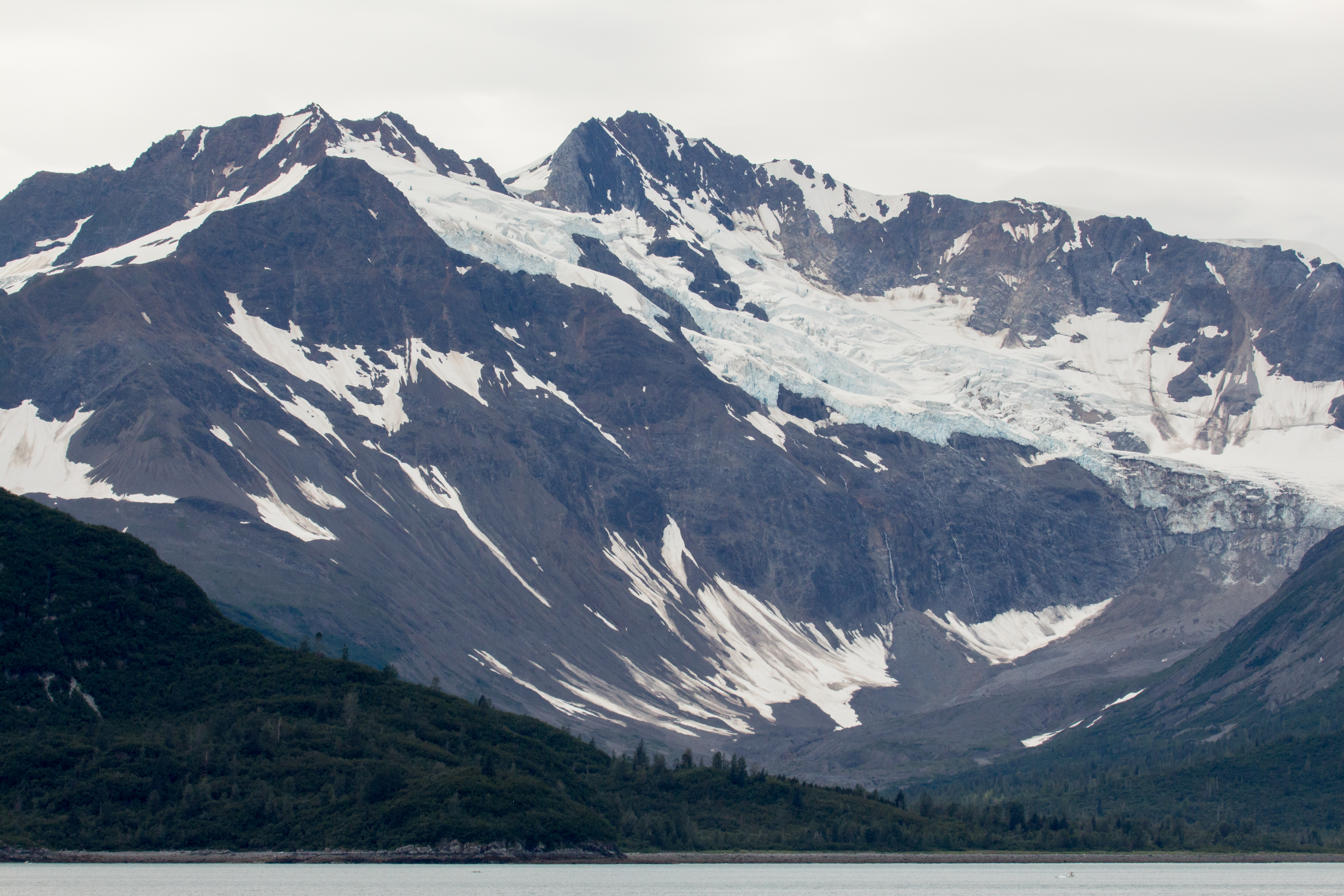
Summit centered, from northeast

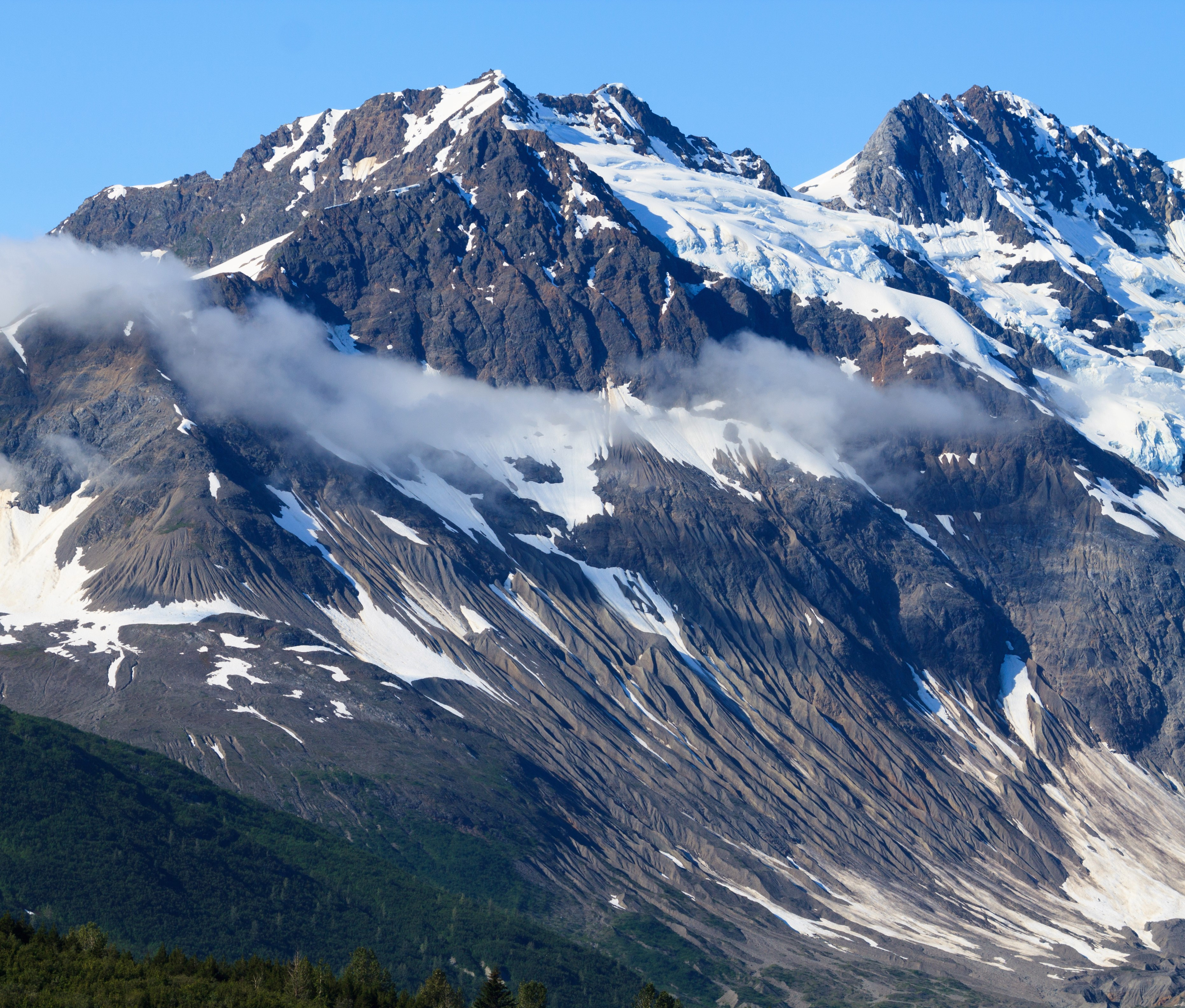
Summit to right

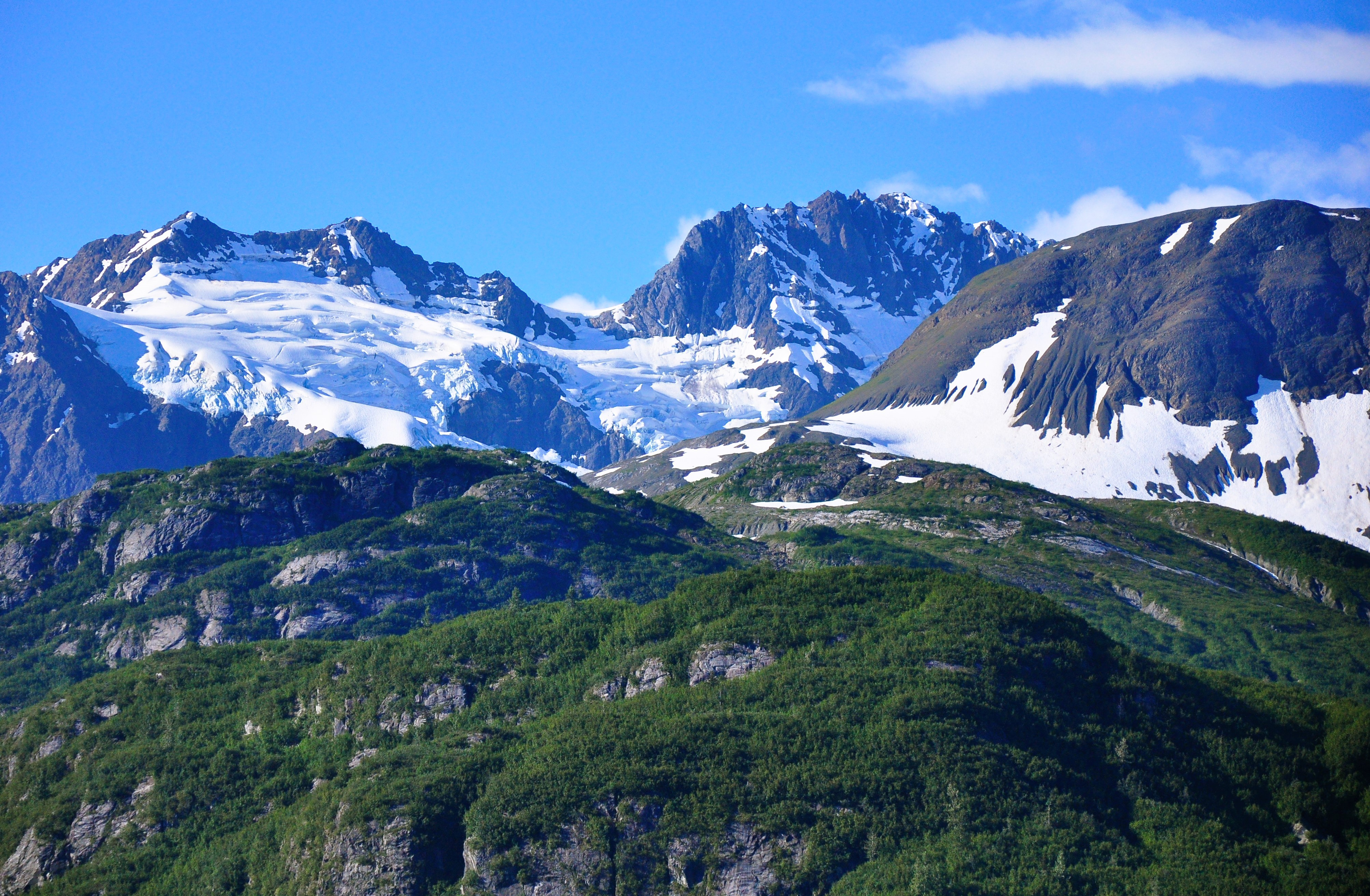

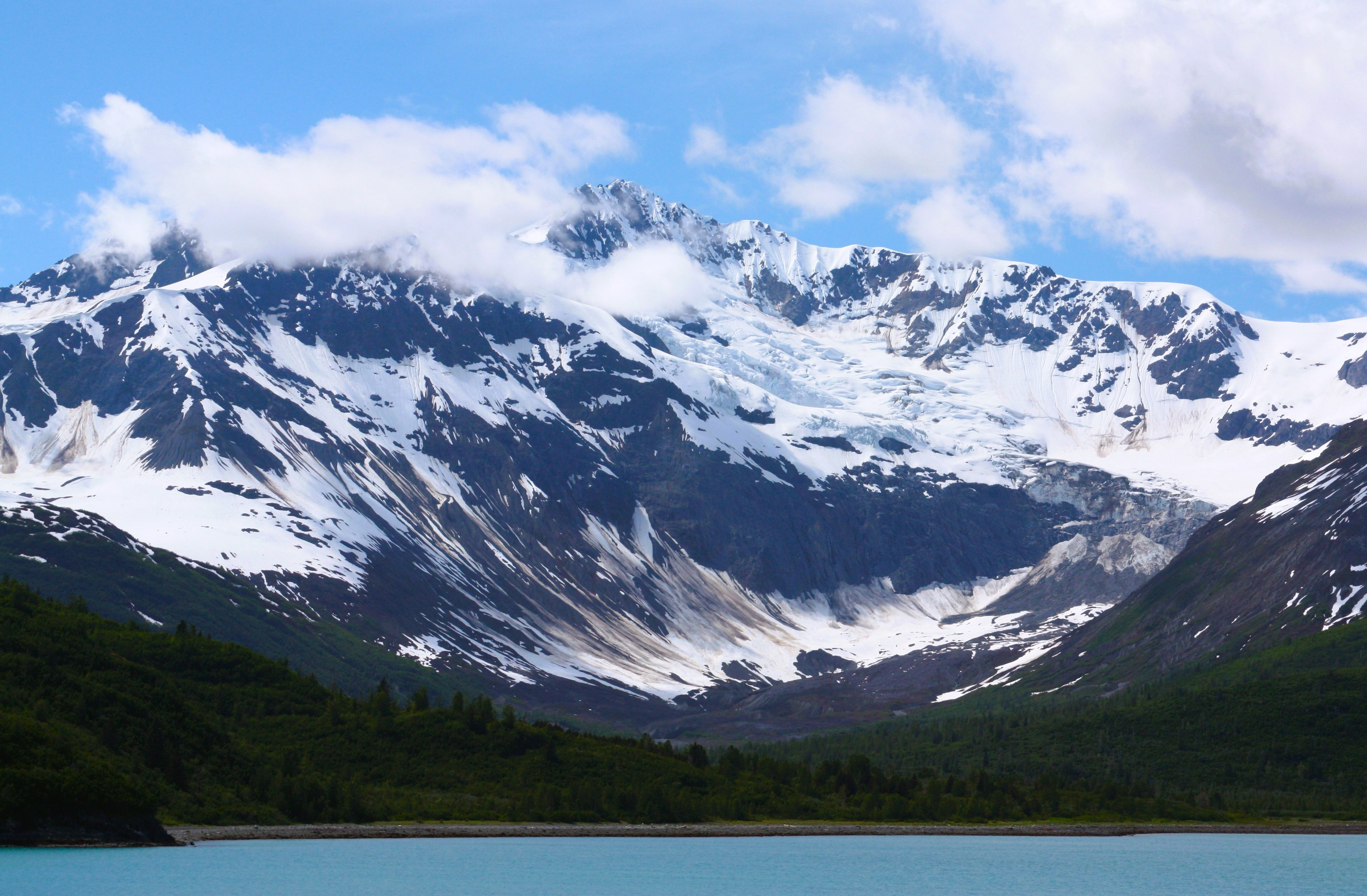

== See also ==
- Geography of Alaska
