= Thermal transport in nanostructures =

The transport of heat in solids involves both electrons and vibrations of the atoms (phonons). When the solid is perfectly ordered over hundreds of thousands of atoms, this transport obeys established physics. However, when the size of the ordered regions decreases new physics can arise, thermal transport in nanostructures. In some cases heat transport is more effective, in others it is not.

== The effect of the limited length of structure ==
In general, two carrier types can contribute to thermal conductivity - electrons and phonons. In nanostructures phonons usually dominate and the phonon properties of the structure become of a particular importance for thermal conductivity. These phonon properties include: phonon group velocity, phonon scattering mechanisms, heat capacity, Grüneisen parameter. Unlike bulk materials, nanoscale devices have thermal properties which are complicated by boundary effects due to small size. It has been shown that in some cases phonon-boundary scattering effects dominate the thermal conduction processes, reducing thermal conductivity.

Depending on the nanostructure size, the phonon mean free path values (Λ) may be comparable or larger than the object size, $L$. When $L$ is larger than the phonon mean free path, Umklapp scattering process limits thermal conductivity (regime of diffusive thermal conductivity). When $L$ is comparable to or smaller than the mean free path (which is of the order 1 μm for carbon nanostructures), the continuous energy model used for bulk materials no longer applies and nonlocal and nonequilibrium aspects to heat transfer also need to be considered. In this case phonons in defectless structure could propagate without scattering and thermal conductivity becomes ballistic (similar to ballistic conductivity). More severe changes in thermal behavior are observed when the feature size $L$ shrinks further down to the wavelength of phonons.

== Nanowires ==
=== Thermal conductivity measurements ===
The first measurement of thermal conductivity in silicon nanowires was published in 2003. Two important features were pointed out: 1) The measured thermal conductivities are significantly lower than that of the bulk Si and, as the wire diameter is decreased, the corresponding thermal conductivity is reduced. 2) As the wire diameter is reduced, the phonon boundary scattering dominates over phonon–phonon Umklapp scattering, which decreases the thermal conductivity with an increase in temperature.

For 56 nm and 115 nm wires k ~ T^{3} dependence was observed, while for 37 nm wire k ~ T^{2} dependence and for 22 nm wire k ~ T dependence were observed. Chen et al. has shown that the one-dimensional cross-over for 20 nm Si nanowire occurs around 8K, while the phenomenon was observed for temperature values greater than 20K. Therefore, the reason of such behaviour is not in the confinement experienced by phonons so that three-dimensional structures display two-dimensional or one-dimensional behavior.

=== Theoretical models for nanowires ===
==== Different phonon modes contribution to thermal conductivity ====
Assuming that Boltzmann transport equation is valid, thermal conductivity can be written as:

$$k=\frac{1}{3}Cv_g\Lambda=\frac{1}{3}Cv_g^2\tau$$

where C is the heat capacity, v_{g} is the group velocity and $\tau$ is the relaxation time. Note that this assumption breaks down when the dimensions of the system are comparable to or smaller than the wavelength of the phonons responsible for thermal transport. In our case, phonon wavelengths are generally in the 1 nm range and the nanowires under consideration are within tens of nanometers range, the assumption is valid.

Different phonon mode contributions to heat conduction can be extracted from analysis of the experimental data for silicon nanowires of different diameters to extract the C·v_{g} product for analysis. It was shown that all phonon modes contributing to thermal transport are excited well below the Si Debye temperature (645 K).

From the thermal conductivity equation, one can write the product C·v_{g} for each isotropic phonon branch i.

$$(Cv_g)_i=\frac{k_B^4 T^3}{2\hbar^3\pi^2}\int \frac{1}{v_{p,i}^2}\left[\frac{x^4 \exp(x)}{(\exp(x)-1)^2}\right]\,dx$$

where $x = h\omega/k_{B}T$ and $v_{p,i}$ is the phonon phase velocity, which is less sensitive to phonon dispersions than the group velocity v_{g}.

Many models of phonon thermal transport ignores the effects of transverse acoustic phonons (TA) at high frequency due to their small group velocity. (Optical phonon contributions are also ignored for the same reason.) However, upper branch of TA phonons have non-zero group velocity at the Brillouin zone boundary along the Γ-Κ direction and, in fact, behave similarly to the longitudinal acoustic phonons (LA) and can contribute to the heat transport.

Then, the possible phonon modes contributing to heat conduction are both LA and TA phonons at low and high frequencies. Using the corresponding dispersion curves, the C·v_{g} product can then be calculated and fitted to the experimental data. The best fit was found when contribution of high-frequency TA phonons is accounted as 70% of the product at room temperature. The remaining 30% is contributed by the LA and TA phonons at low-frequency.

==== Using complete phonon dispersions ====
Thermal conductivity in nanowires can be computed based on complete phonon dispersions instead of the linearized dispersion relations commonly used to calculate thermal conductivity in bulk materials.

Assuming the phonon transport is diffusive and Boltzmann transport equation (BTE) is valid, nanowire thermal conductance G(T) can be defined as:

$$G(T) \simeq \sum_{\alpha}{\int{ \frac{\lambda_a(k_z)}{L} \frac{\hbar \omega_{\alpha}(k_z)}{2\pi} \frac{df_B}{dT}v_z(\alpha,k_z)dk_z}}$$

where the variable α represents discrete quantum numbers associated with sub-bands found in one-dimensional phonon dispersion relations, f_{B} represents the Bose-Einstein distribution, v_{z} is the phonon velocity in the z direction and λ is the phonon relaxation length along the direction of the wire length. Thermal conductivity is then expressed as:

$$k(T)=\frac{1}{S} \sum{\alpha} {\int_{0}^{\frac{\pi}{a_z}} \lambda_\alpha (k_z) \frac{\hbar\omega_\alpha (k_z)}{2\pi}\frac{df_B}{dT}v_z(\alpha,k_z)\, dk_z}$$

where S is the cross sectional area of the wire, a_{z} is the lattice constant.

It was shown that, using this formula and atomistically computed phonon dispersions (with interatomic potentials developed in), it is possible to predictively calculate lattice thermal conductivity curves for nanowires, in good agreement with experiments. On the other hand, it was not possible to obtain correct results with the approximated Callaway formula. These results are expected to apply to "nanowhiskers" for which phonon confinement effects are unimportant. Si nanowires wider than ~35 nm are within this category.

==== Very thin nanowires ====
For large diameter nanowires, theoretical models assuming the nanowire diameters are comparable to the mean free path and that the mean free path is independent of phonon frequency have been able to closely match the experimental results. But for very thin nanowires whose dimensions are comparable to the dominant phonon wavelength, a new model is required. The study in has shown that in such cases, the phonon-boundary scattering is dependent on frequency. The new mean free path is then should be used:

$$l^{-1} = B \left(\frac{h}{d}\right)^2 \frac{1}{d} \left(\frac{\omega}{\omega_D}\right)^2N(\omega)$$

Here, l is the mean free path (same as Λ). The parameter h is length scale associated with the disordered region, d is the diameter, N(ω) is number of modes at frequency ω, and B is a constant related to the disorder region.

Thermal conductance is then calculated using the Landauer formula:

$$G(T) = \int\limits_0^{\infty} \frac{\mathrm{d}\omega}{2 \pi} \,
\left( \frac{N_1(\omega)}{1+L/l(\omega)} +
\frac{N_2(\omega)}{1+L/d} \right)
\frac{\hbar^2 \omega^2}{k_B T^2}
\frac{\exp(\hbar \omega / k_B T)}{[\exp(\hbar\omega / k_BT) - 1]^2}$$

== Carbon nanotubes ==
As nanoscale graphitic structures, carbon nanotubes are of great interest for their thermal properties. The low-temperature specific heat and thermal conductivity show direct evidence of 1-D quantization of the phonon band structure. Modeling of the low-temperature specific heat allows determination of the on-tube phonon velocity, the splitting of phonon subbands on a single tube, and the interaction between neighboring tubes in a bundle.

=== Thermal conductivity measurements ===
Measurements show a single-wall carbon nanotubes (SWNTs) room-temperature thermal conductivity about 3500 W/(m·K), and over 3000 W/(m·K) for individual multiwalled carbon nanotubes (MWNTs). It is difficult to replicate these properties on the macroscale due to imperfect contact between individual CNTs, and so tangible objects from CNTs such as films or fibres have reached only up to 1500 W/(m·K) so far. Addition of nanotubes to epoxy resin can double the thermal conductivity for a loading of only 1%, showing that nanotube composite materials may be useful for thermal management applications.

=== Theoretical models for nanotubes ===
Thermal conductivity in CNT is mainly due to phonons rather than electrons so the Wiedemann–Franz law is not applicable.

In general, the thermal conductivity is a tensor quality, but for this discussion, it is only important to consider the diagonal elements:

$$k_{zz} = \sum C{v_z}^2\tau$$

where C is the specific heat, and v_{z} and $\tau$ are the group velocity and relaxation time of a given phonon state.

At temperatures far below the Debye temperature, the relaxation time is determined by scattering of fixed impurities, defects, sample boundaries, etc. and is roughly constant. Therefore, in ordinary materials, the low-temperature thermal conductivity has the same temperature dependence as the specific heat. However, in anisotropic materials, this relationship does not strictly hold. Because the contribution of each state is weighted by the scattering time and the square of the velocity, the thermal conductivity preferentially samples states with large velocity and scattering time. For instance, in graphite, the thermal conductivity parallel to the basal planes is only weakly dependent on the interlayer phonons. In SWNT bundles, it is likely that k(T) depends only on the on-tube phonons, rather than the intertube modes.

Thermal conductivity is of particular interest in low-dimensional systems. For CNT, represented as 1-D ballistic electronic channel, the electronic conductance is quantized, with a universal value of

$$G_0 = \frac{2e^2}{h}$$

Similarly, for a single ballistic 1-D channel, the thermal conductance is independent of materials parameters, and there exists a quantum of thermal conductance, which is linear in temperature:

$$G_{th} = \frac{\pi^2 {k_B}^2 T}{3h}$$

Possible conditions for observation of this quantum were examined by Rego and Kirczenow. In 1999, Keith Schwab, Erik Henriksen, John Worlock, and Michael Roukes carried out a series of experimental measurements that enabled first observation of the thermal conductance quantum. The measurements employed suspended nanostructures coupled to sensitive dc SQUID measurement devices. In 2008, a colorized electron micrograph of one of the Caltech devices was acquired for the permanent collection of the Museum of Modern Art in New York.

At high temperatures, three-phonon Umklapp scattering begins to limit the phonon relaxation time. Therefore, the phonon thermal conductivity displays a peak and decreases with increasing temperature. Umklapp scattering requires production of a phonon beyond the Brillouin zone boundary; because of the high Debye temperature of diamond and graphite, the peak in the thermal conductivity of these materials is near 100 K, significantly higher than for most other materials. In less crystalline forms of graphite, such as carbon fibers, the peak in k(T) occurs at higher temperatures, because defect scattering remains dominant over Umklapp scattering to higher temperature. In low-dimensional systems, it is difficult to conserve both energy and momentum for Umklapp processes, and so it may be possible that Umklapp scattering is suppressed in nanotubes relative to 2-D or 3-D forms of carbon.

Berber et al. have calculated the phonon thermal conductivity of isolated nanotubes. The value k(T) peaks near 100 K, and then decreases with increasing temperature. The value of k(T) at the peak (37,000 W/(m·K)) is comparable to the highest thermal conductivity ever measured (41,000 W/(m·K) for an isotopically pure diamond sample at 104 K). Even at room temperature, the thermal conductivity is quite high (6600 W/(m·K)), exceeding the reported room-temperature thermal conductivity of isotopically pure diamond by almost a factor of 2.

In graphite, the interlayer interactions quench the thermal conductivity by nearly 1 order of magnitude. It is likely that the same process occurs in nanotube bundles. Thus it is significant that the coupling between tubes in bundles is weaker than expected. It may be that this weak coupling, which is problematic for mechanical applications of nanotubes, is an advantage for thermal applications.

==== Phonon density of states for nanotubes ====
The phonon density of states is to calculated through band structure of isolated nanotubes, which is studied in Saito et al. and Sanchez-Portal et al. When a graphene sheet is rolled into a nanotube, the 2-D band structure folds into a large number of 1-D subbands. In a (10,10) tube, for instance, the six phonon bands (three acoustic and three optical) of the graphene sheet become 66 separate 1-D subbands. A direct result of this folding is that the nanotube density of states has a number of sharp peaks due to 1-D van Hove singularities, which are absent in graphene and graphite. Despite the presence of these singularities, the overall density of states is similar at high energies, so that the high temperature specific heat should be roughly equal as well. This is to be expected: the high-energy phonons are more reflective of carbon–carbon bonding than the geometry of the graphene sheet.

== Thin films ==
Thin films are prevalent in the micro and nanoelectronics industry for the fabrication of sensors, actuators and transistors; thus, thermal transport properties affect the performance and reliability of many structures such as transistors, solid-state lasers, sensors, and actuators. Although these devices are traditionally made from bulk crystalline material (silicon), they often contain thin films of oxides, polysilicon, metal, as well as superlattices such as thin-film stacks of GaAs/AlGaAs for lasers.

=== Single-crystal thin films ===
Silicon-on-insulator (SOI) films with silicon thicknesses of 0.05 μm to 10 μm above a buried silicon dioxide layer are increasingly popular for semiconductor devices due to the increased dielectric isolation associated with SOI/ SOI wafers contain a thin-layer of silicon on an oxide layer and a thin-film of single-crystal silicon, which reduces the effective thermal conductivity of the material by up to 50% as compared to bulk silicon, due to phonon-interface scattering and defects and dislocations in the crystalline structure. Previous studies by Asheghi et al., show a similar trend. Other studies of thin-films show similar thermal effects.

=== Superlattices ===
Thermal properties associated with superlattices are critical in the development of semiconductor lasers. Heat conduction of superlattices is less understood than homogeneous thin films. It is theorized that superlattices have a lower thermal conductivity due to impurities from lattice mismatches and at the heterojunctions. Phonon-interface scattering at heterojunctions needs to be considered in this case; fully elastic scattering underestimates the heat conduction, while fully inelastic scattering overestimates the heat conduction. For example, a Si/Ge thin-film superlattice has a greater decrease in thermal conductivity than an AlAs/GaAs film stack due to increased lattice mismatch. A simple estimate of heat conduction of superlattices is:

$$k_n = \left( \frac{C_1 v_1 C_2 v_2}{C_1 v_1 + C_2 v_2} \right) \left( \frac{d_1 + d_2}{2} \right)$$

where C_{1} and C_{2} are the corresponding heat capacity of film1 and film2 respectively, v_{1} and v_{2} are the acoustic propagation velocities in film1 and film2, and d1 and d2 are the thicknesses of film1 and film2. This model neglects scattering within the layers and assumes fully diffuse, inelastic scattering.

=== Polycrystalline films ===
Polycrystalline films are common in semiconductor devices, as the gate electrode of a field-effect transistor is often made of polycrystalline silicon. If the polysilicon grain sizes are small, internal scattering from grain boundaries can overwhelm the effects of film-boundary scattering. Also, grain boundaries contain more impurities, which result in impurity scattering. Likewise, disordered or amorphous films will experience a severe reduction of thermal conductivity, since the small grain size results in numerous grain-boundary scattering effects. Different deposition methods of amorphous films will result in differences in impurities and grain sizes.

The simplest approach to modeling phonon scattering at grain boundaries is to increase the scattering rate by introducing this equation:

$$\tau_G^{-1}=B\frac{v}{d_G}$$

where B is a dimensionless parameter that correlates with the phonon reflection coefficient at the grain boundaries, d_{G} is the characteristic grain size, and v is the phonon velocity through the material. A more formal approach to estimating the scattering rate is:

$${\tau_G}^{-1} = \frac{2 \nu}{\pi d_G} \left[ 1 - \exp\left(-\frac{\pi^2}{4}\nu_G \right) \right]$$

where v_{G} is the dimensionless grain-boundary scattering strength, defined as

$$\nu_G = \sum_{j} \sigma_j \nu_j$$

Here $\sigma_j$ is the cross-section of a grain-boundary area, and ν_{j} is the density of the grain boundary area.

=== Measuring thermal conductivity of thin films ===
There are two approaches to experimentally determine the thermal conductivity of thin films. The goal of experimental metrology of thermal conductivity of thin films is to attain an accurate thermal measurement without disturbing the properties of the thin-film.

Electrical heating is used for thin films which have a lower thermal conductivity than the substrate; it is fairly accurate in measuring out-of-plane conductivity. Often, a resistive heater and thermistor is fabricated on the sample film using a highly conductive metal, such as aluminium. The most straightforward approach would be to apply a steady-state current and measure the change in temperature of adjacent thermistors. A more versatile approach uses an AC signal applied to the electrodes. The third harmonic of the AC signal reveals heating and temperature fluctuations of the material.

Laser heating is a non-contact metrology method, which uses picosecond and nanosecond laser pulses to deliver thermal energy to the substrate. Laser heating uses a pump-probe mechanism; the pump beam introduces energy to the thin-film, as the probe beam picks up the characteristics of how the energy propagates through the film. Laser heating is advantageous because the energy delivered to the film can be precisely controlled; furthermore, the short heating duration decouples the thermal conductivity of the thin film from the substrate.

== Thermal conductivity in nano-fluids ==
In the early 2000's several studies reported anomalously high thermal conductivity enhancement in nano-fluids, i.e. suspensions of nanoparticles in liquids. Subsequent detailed studies (such as multinational "Benchmark Study on the Thermal Conductivity of Nanofluids") failed to reproduce the reported anomalies, and their experimental findings were consistent with shape-adjusted mean field theory.
