= Two-dimensional electron gas =

Scientific model in solid-state physics

A two-dimensional electron gas (2DEG) is a scientific model in solid-state physics. It is an electron gas that is free to move in two dimensions, but tightly confined in the third. This tight confinement leads to quantized energy levels for motion in the third direction, which can then be ignored for most problems. Thus the electrons appear to be a 2D sheet embedded in a 3D world. The analogous construct of holes is called a two-dimensional hole gas (2DHG), and such systems have many useful and interesting properties.

== Realizations ==
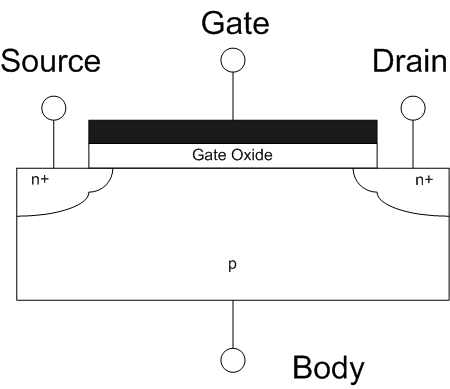
In MOSFETs, the 2DEG is only present when the transistor is in inversion mode, and is found directly beneath the gate oxide.

Band edge diagram of a basic HEMT. Conduction band edge E_{C} and Fermi level E_{F} determine the electron density in the 2DEG. Quantized levels form in the triangular well (yellow region) and optimally only one of them lies below E_{F}.

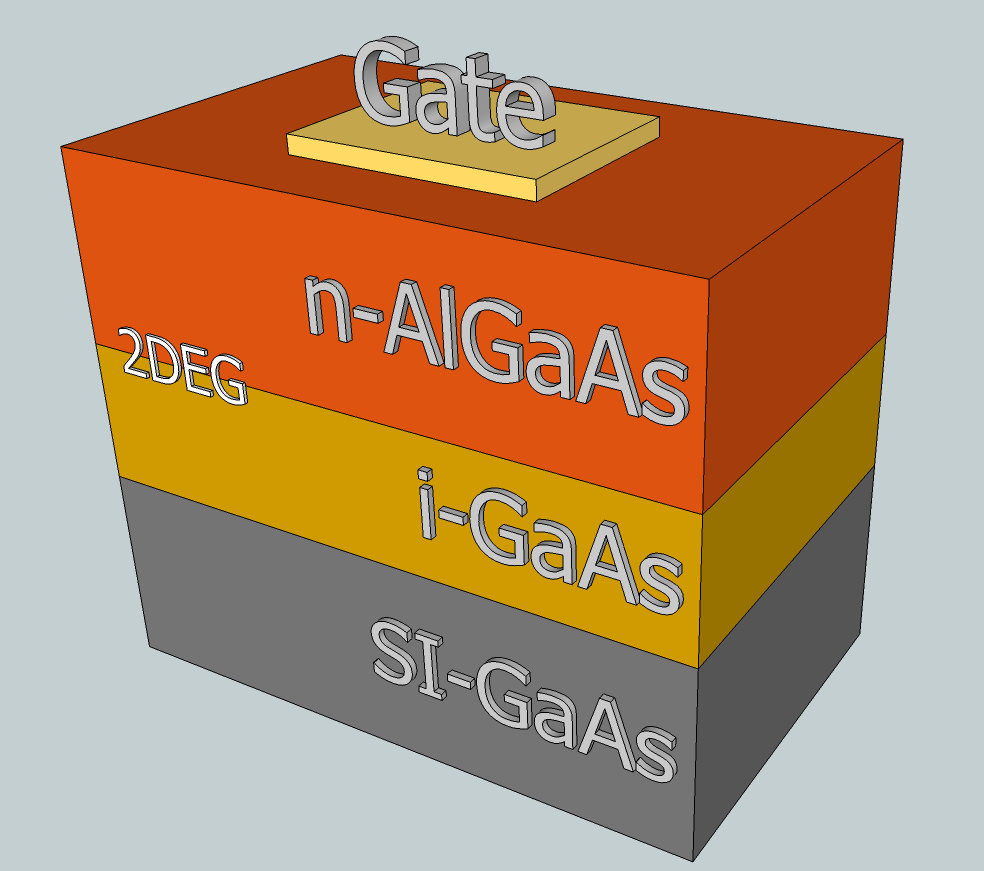
Heterostructure corresponding to the band edge diagram above.

Most 2DEGs are found in transistor-like structures made from semiconductors. The most commonly encountered 2DEG is the layer of electrons found in MOSFETs (metal–oxide–semiconductor field-effect transistors). When the transistor is in inversion mode, the electrons underneath the gate oxide are confined to the semiconductor-oxide interface, and thus occupy well defined energy levels. For thin-enough potential wells and temperatures not too high, only the lowest level is occupied (see the figure caption), and so the motion of the electrons perpendicular to the interface can be ignored. However, the electron is free to move parallel to the interface, and so is quasi-two-dimensional.

Other methods for engineering 2DEGs are high-electron-mobility-transistors (HEMTs) and rectangular quantum wells. HEMTs are field-effect transistors that utilize the heterojunction between two semiconducting materials to confine electrons to a triangular quantum well. Electrons confined to the heterojunction of HEMTs exhibit higher mobilities than those in MOSFETs, since the former device utilizes an intentionally undoped channel thereby mitigating the deleterious effect of ionized impurity scattering. Two closely spaced heterojunction interfaces may be used to confine electrons to a rectangular quantum well. Careful choice of the materials and alloy compositions allow control of the carrier densities within the 2DEG.

Electrons may also be confined to the surface of a material. For example, free electrons will float on the surface of liquid helium, and are free to move along the surface, but stick to the helium; some of the earliest work in 2DEGs was done using this system. Besides liquid helium, there are also solid insulators (such as topological insulators) that support conductive surface electronic states.

Recently, atomically thin solid materials have been developed (graphene, as well as metal dichalcogenide such as molybdenum disulfide) where the electrons are confined to an extreme degree. The two-dimensional electron system in graphene can be tuned to either a 2DEG or 2DHG (2-D hole gas) by gating or chemical doping. This has been a topic of current research due to the versatile (some existing but mostly envisaged) applications of graphene.

A separate class of heterostructures that can host 2DEGs are oxides. Although both sides of the heterostructure are insulators, the 2DEG at the interface may arise even without doping (which is the usual approach in semiconductors). Typical example is a ZnO/ZnMgO heterostructure. More examples can be found in a recent review including a notable discovery of 2004, a 2DEG at the LaAlO_{3}/SrTiO_{3} interface which becomes superconducting at low temperatures. The origin of this 2DEG is still unknown, but it may be similar to modulation doping in semiconductors, with electric-field-induced oxygen vacancies acting as the dopants.

== Experiments ==
Considerable research involving 2DEGs and 2DHGs has been done, and much continues to this day. 2DEGs offer a mature system of extremely high mobility electrons, especially at low temperatures. When cooled to 4 K, 2DEGs may have mobilities $\mu$ of the order of 1,000,000 cm^{2}/Vs and lower temperatures can lead to further increase of $\mu$ still. Specially grown, state of the art heterostructures with mobilities around 30,000,000 cm^{2}/(V·s) have been made. These enormous mobilities offer a test bed for exploring fundamental physics, since besides confinement and effective mass, the electrons do not interact with the semiconductor very often, sometimes traveling several micrometers before colliding; this so-called mean free path $\ell$ can be estimated in the parabolic band approximation as

$$\ell = v_{\rm F}\tau = \sqrt{2\pi n} \frac{\hbar\mu}{e} \approx 5.2\ \mu\mathrm{m}\times \mu\ [10^6\ \mathrm{cm^2/Vs}]\sqrt{n\ [10^{11}\ \mathrm{cm^{-2}}]}$$

where $n$ is the electron density in the 2DEG. Note that $\mu$ typically depends on $n$. Mobilities of 2DHG systems are smaller than those of most 2DEG systems, in part due to larger effective masses of holes (few 1000 cm^{2}/(V·s) can already be considered high mobility).

Aside from being in practically every semiconductor device in use today, two dimensional systems allow access to interesting physics. The quantum Hall effect was first observed in a 2DEG, which led to two Nobel Prizes in physics, of Klaus von Klitzing in 1985, and of Robert B. Laughlin, Horst L. Störmer and Daniel C. Tsui in 1998. Spectrum of a laterally modulated 2DEG (a two-dimensional superlattice) subject to magnetic field B can be represented as the Hofstadter's butterfly, a fractal structure in the energy vs B plot, signatures of which were observed in transport experiments. Many more interesting phenomena pertaining to 2DEG have been studied.[A]

== See also ==
- Two-dimensional gas

== Footnotes ==
- A. Examples of more 2DEG physics. Full control of the 2DEG spin polarization was demonstrated. Possibly, this could be relevant to quantum information technology. Wigner crystallization in magnetic field. Microwave-induced magnetoresistance oscillations discovered by R. G. Mani et al. Possible existence of non-abelian quasiparticles in the fractional quantum Hall effect at filling factor 5/2.
