= High-electron-mobility transistor =

Type of field-effect transistor

Cross section of a GaAs/AlGaAs/InGaAs pHEMT

Band diagram of GaAs/AlGaAs heterojunction-based HEMT, at equilibrium.

A high-electron-mobility transistor (HEMT or HEM FET), also known as heterostructure FET (HFET) or modulation-doped FET (MODFET), is a field-effect transistor incorporating a junction between two materials with different band gaps (i.e. a heterojunction) as the channel instead of a doped region (as is generally the case for a MOSFET). A commonly used material combination is GaAs with AlGaAs, though there is wide variation, dependent on the application of the device. Devices incorporating more indium generally show better high-frequency performance, while in recent years, gallium nitride HEMTs have attracted attention due to their high-power performance.

Like other FETs, HEMTs can be used in integrated circuits as digital on-off switches. FETs can also be used as amplifiers for large amounts of current using a small voltage as a control signal. Both of these uses are made possible by the FET's unique current–voltage characteristics. HEMT transistors are able to operate at higher frequencies than ordinary transistors, up to millimeter wave frequencies, and are used in high-frequency products such as cell phones, satellite television receivers, voltage converters, and radar equipment. They are widely used in satellite receivers, in low power amplifiers and in the defense industry.

== Applications ==
The applications of HEMTs include microwave and millimeter wave communications, imaging, radar, radio astronomy, and power switching. They are found in many types of equipment ranging from cellphones, power supply adapters and DBS receivers to radio astronomy and electronic warfare systems such as radar systems. Numerous companies worldwide develop, manufacture, and sell HEMT-based devices in the form of discrete transistors, as 'monolithic microwave integrated circuits' (MMICs), or within power switching integrated circuits.

HEMTs are suitable for applications where high gain and low noise at high frequencies are required, as they have shown current gain to frequencies greater than 600 GHz and power gain to frequencies greater than 1THz. Gallium nitride based HEMTs are used as power switching transistors for voltage converter applications due to their low on-state resistances, low switching losses, and high breakdown strength. These gallium nitride enhanced voltage converter applications include AC adapters, which benefit from smaller package sizes due to the power circuitry requiring smaller passive electronic components. Gallium nitride HEMTs are also being developed for higher-power applications such as power inverters in electric vehicles.

== History ==
The invention of the high-electron-mobility transistor (HEMT) is usually attributed to physicist Takashi Mimura (三村 高志), while working at Fujitsu in Japan. The basis for the HEMT was the GaAs (gallium arsenide) MOSFET (metal–oxide–semiconductor field-effect transistor), which Mimura had been researching as an alternative to the standard silicon (Si) MOSFET since 1977. He conceived the HEMT in the spring of 1979, when he read about a modulated-doped heterojunction superlattice developed at Bell Labs in the United States, by Ray Dingle, Arthur Gossard and Horst Störmer who filed a patent in April 1978. Mimura filed a patent disclosure for a HEMT in August 1979, and then a patent later that year. The first device demonstrated by Mimura and Satoshi Hiyamizu in May 1980 was a D-HEMT that is normally on and applied negative voltage on gate results in depletion of the channel. Later that year they demonstrated the more practical E-HEMT operating in enhancement-mode, which is normally off and the channel under the gate is populated by positive gate voltage.

Independently, Daniel Delagebeaudeuf and Tran Linh Nguyen, while working at Thomson-CSF in France, filed a patent for a similar type of field-effect transistor in March 1979. It also cites the Bell Labs patent as an influence. The first demonstration of an "inverted" HEMT was presented by Delagebeaudeuf and Nguyen in August 1980.

One of the earliest mentions of a GaN-based HEMT is in the 1993 Applied Physics Letters article, by Khan et al. Later, in 2004, P.D. Ye and B. Yang et al demonstrated a GaN (gallium nitride) metal–oxide–semiconductor HEMT (MOS-HEMT). It used atomic layer deposition (ALD) aluminum oxide (Al_{2}O_{3}) film both as a gate dielectric and for surface passivation.

== Operation ==
Field effect transistors whose operation relies on the formation of a two-dimensional electron gas (2DEG) are known as HEMTs. In HEMTS electric current flows between a drain and source element via the 2DEG, which is located at the interface between two layers of differing band gaps, termed the heterojunction. Some examples of previously explored heterojunction layer compositions (heterostructures) for HEMTs include AlGaN/GaN, AlGaAs/GaAs, InGaAs/GaAs, and Si/SiGe.

=== Advantages ===
The advantages of HEMTs over other transistor architectures, like the bipolar junction transistor and the MOSFET, are the higher operating temperatures, higher breakdown strengths, and lower specific on-state resistances, all in the case of GaN-based HEMTs compared to Si-based MOSFETs. Furthermore, InP-based HEMTs exhibit low noise performance and higher switching speeds.

=== 2DEG channel creation ===
The wide band element is doped with donor atoms; thus it has excess electrons in its conduction band. These electrons will diffuse to the adjacent narrow band material's conduction band due to the availability of states with lower energy. The movement of electrons will cause a change in potential and thus an electric field between the materials. The electric field will push electrons back to the wide band element's conduction band. The diffusion process continues until electron diffusion and electron drift balance each other, creating a junction at equilibrium similar to a p–n junction. Note that the undoped narrow band gap material now has excess majority charge carriers. The fact that the charge carriers are majority carriers yields high switching speeds, and the fact that the low band gap semiconductor is undoped means that there are no donor atoms to cause scattering and thus yields high mobility.

In the case of GaAs HEMTs, they make use of high mobility electrons generated using the heterojunction of a highly doped wide-bandgap n-type donor-supply layer (AlGaAs in our example) and a non-doped narrow-bandgap channel layer with no dopant impurities (GaAs in this case). The electrons generated in the thin n-type AlGaAs layer drop completely into the GaAs layer to form a depleted AlGaAs layer, because the heterojunction created by different band-gap materials forms a quantum well (a steep canyon) in the conduction band on the GaAs side where the electrons can move quickly without colliding with any impurities because the GaAs layer is undoped, and from which they cannot escape. The effect of this is the creation of a very thin layer of highly mobile conducting electrons with very high concentration, giving the channel very low resistivity (or to put it another way, "high electron mobility").

=== Electrostatic mechanism ===
Since GaAs has higher electron affinity, free electrons in the AlGaAs layer are transferred to the undoped GaAs layer where they form a two dimensional high mobility electron gas within 100 ångström (10 nm) of the interface. The n-type AlGaAs layer of the HEMT is depleted completely through two depletion mechanisms:

- Trapping of free electrons by surface states causes the surface depletion.
- Transfer of electrons into the undoped GaAs layer brings about the interface depletion.

The Fermi level of the gate metal is matched to the pinning point, which is 1.2 eV below the conduction band. With the reduced AlGaAs layer thickness, the electrons supplied by donors in the AlGaAs layer are insufficient to pin the layer. As a result, band bending is moving upward and the two-dimensional electrons gas does not appear. When a positive voltage greater than the threshold voltage is applied to the gate, electrons accumulate at the interface and form a two-dimensional electron gas.

=== Modulation doping in HEMTs ===
An important aspect of HEMTs is that the band discontinuities across the conduction and valence bands can be modified separately. This allows the type of carriers in and out of the device to be controlled. As HEMTs require electrons to be the main carriers, a graded doping can be applied in one of the materials, thus making the conduction band discontinuity smaller and keeping the valence band discontinuity the same. This diffusion of carriers leads to the accumulation of electrons along the boundary of the two regions inside the narrow band gap material. The accumulation of electrons leads to a very high current in these devices. The term "modulation doping" refers to the fact that the dopants are spatially in a different region from the current carrying electrons. This technique was invented by Horst Störmer at Bell Labs.

== Manufacture ==
MODFETs can be manufactured by epitaxial growth of a strained SiGe layer. In the strained layer, the germanium content increases linearly to around 40-50%. This concentration of germanium allows the formation of a quantum well structure with a high conduction band offset and a high density of very mobile charge carriers. The end result is a FET with ultra-high switching speeds and low noise. InGaAs/AlGaAs, AlGaN/InGaN, and other compounds are also used in place of SiGe. InP and GaN are starting to replace SiGe as the base material in MODFETs because of their better noise and power ratios.

== Versions of HEMTs ==
=== By growth technology: pHEMT and mHEMT ===
Ideally, the two different materials used for a heterojunction would have the same lattice constant (spacing between the atoms). In practice, the lattice constants are typically slightly different (e.g. AlGaAs on GaAs), resulting in crystal defects. As an analogy, imagine pushing together two plastic combs with a slightly different spacing. At regular intervals, you'll see two teeth clump together. In semiconductors, these discontinuities form deep-level traps and greatly reduce device performance.

A HEMT where this rule is violated is called a pHEMT or pseudomorphic HEMT. This is achieved by using an extremely thin layer of one of the materials – so thin that the crystal lattice simply stretches to fit the other material. This technique allows the construction of transistors with larger bandgap differences than otherwise possible, giving them better performance.

Another way to use materials of different lattice constants is to place a buffer layer between them. This is done in the mHEMT or metamorphic HEMT, an advancement of the pHEMT. The buffer layer is made of AlInAs, with the indium concentration graded so that it can match the lattice constant of both the GaAs substrate and the GaInAs channel. This brings the advantage that practically any Indium concentration in the channel can be realized, so the devices can be optimized for different applications (low indium concentration provides low noise; high indium concentration gives high gain).

=== By electrical behaviour: eHEMT and dHEMT ===
HEMTs made of semiconductor hetero-interfaces lacking interfacial net polarization charge, such as AlGaAs/GaAs, require positive gate voltage or appropriate donor-doping in the AlGaAs barrier to attract the electrons towards the gate, which forms the 2D electron gas and enables conduction of electron currents. This behaviour is similar to that of commonly used field-effect transistors in the enhancement mode, and such a device is called enhancement HEMT, or eHEMT.

When a HEMT is built from AlGaN/GaN, higher power density and breakdown voltage can be achieved. Nitrides also have different crystal structure with lower symmetry, namely the wurtzite one, which has built-in electrical polarisation. Since this polarization differs between the GaN channel layer and AlGaN barrier layer, a sheet of uncompensated charge in the order of 0.01-0.03 C/m$^2$ is formed. Due to the crystal orientation typically used for epitaxial growth ("gallium-faced") and the device geometry favorable for fabrication (gate on top), this charge sheet is positive, causing the 2D electron gas to be formed even if there is no doping. Such a transistor is normally on, and will turn off only if the gate is negatively biased - thus this kind of HEMT is known as depletion HEMT, or dHEMT. By sufficient doping of the barrier with acceptors (e.g. Mg), the built-in charge can be compensated to restore the more customary eHEMT operation, however high-density p-doping of nitrides is technologically challenging due to dopant diffusion into the channel.

=== Induced HEMT ===
In contrast to a modulation-doped HEMT, an induced high electron mobility transistor provides the flexibility to tune different electron densities with a top gate, since the charge carriers are "induced" to the 2DEG plane rather than created by dopants. The absence of a doped layer enhances the electron mobility significantly when compared to their modulation-doped counterparts. This level of cleanliness provides opportunities to perform research into the field of quantum billiards for quantum chaos studies, or applications in ultra stable and ultra sensitive electronic devices.

== See also ==
- Junction field-effect transistor (JFET)
