= Jung Han =

Jung Han from Yale University, New Haven, Connecticut, United States was named Fellow of the Institute of Electrical and Electronics Engineers (IEEE) in 2013 for contributions to epitaxial technologies for wide bandgap semiconductor materials and devices.
