= Modulation doping =

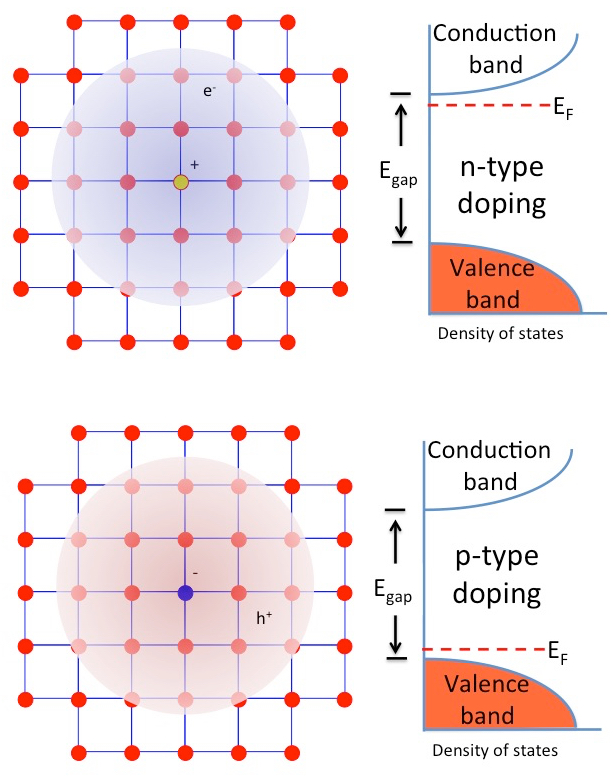

Modulation doping is a technique for fabricating semiconductors such that the free charge carriers are spatially separated from the donors. Because this eliminates scattering from the donors, modulation-doped semiconductors have very high carrier mobilities.

== History ==
Modulation doping was conceived in Bell Labs in 1977 following a conversation between Horst Störmer and Ray Dingle, and implemented shortly afterwards by Arthur Gossard. Störmer and Dan Tsui used a modulation-doped wafer to discover the fractional quantum Hall effect.

== Implementation ==
Modulation-doped semiconductor crystals are commonly grown by epitaxy to allow successive layers of different semiconductor species to be deposited. One common structure uses a layer of AlGaAs deposited over GaAs, with Si n-type donors in the AlGaAs.

== Applications ==
=== Field effect transistors ===
Modulation-doped transistors can reach high electrical mobilities and therefore fast operation. A modulation-doped field-effect transistor is known as a MODFET.

=== Low-temperature electronics ===
One advantage of modulation doping is that the charge carriers cannot become trapped on the donors even at the lowest temperatures. For this reason, modulation-doped heterostructures allow electronics to be operated at cryogenic temperatures.

=== Quantum computing ===
Modulation-doped two-dimensional electron gases can be gated to create quantum dots. Electrons trapped in these dots can then be operated as quantum bits.
