= Electron-longitudinal acoustic phonon interaction =

The electron-longitudinal acoustic phonon interaction is an interaction that can take place between an electron and a longitudinal acoustic (LA) phonon in a material such as a semiconductor.

== Displacement operator of the LA phonon ==
The equations of motion of the atoms of mass M which locates in the periodic lattice is

$$M \frac {d^{2}} {dt^{2}} u_{n} = -k_{0} ( u_{n-1} + u_{n+1} -2u_{n} )$$,

where $u_{n}$ is the displacement of the nth atom from their equilibrium positions.

Defining the displacement $u_{\ell}$ of the $\ell$th atom by $u_{\ell}= x_{\ell} - \ell a$, where $x_{\ell}$ is the coordinates of the $\ell$th atom and $a$ is the lattice constant,

the displacement is given by $u_{l}= A e^{i ( q \ell a - \omega t)}$

Then using Fourier transform:

$$Q_{q} = \frac {1} {\sqrt {N}} \sum_{\ell} u_{\ell} e^{- i q a \ell }$$

and

$$u_{\ell} = \frac {1} {\sqrt {N}} \sum_{q} Q_{q} e^{ i q a \ell }$$.

Since $u_{\ell}$ is a Hermite operator,

$$u_{\ell} = \frac {1} {2 \sqrt{N}} \sum_{q} (Q_{q} e^{iqa\ell} + Q^{\dagger}_{q} e^{-iqa\ell} )$$

From the definition of the creation and annihilation operator $a^{\dagger}_{q} = \frac {q} {\sqrt{2M\hbar\omega_{q}}}(M\omega_{q}Q_{-q}-iP_{q}), \; a_{q} = \frac {q} {\sqrt{2M\hbar\omega_{q}}}(M\omega_{q}Q_{-q}+iP_{q})$

$Q_{q}$ is written as

$$Q_{q} = \sqrt { \frac {\hbar} {2M\omega_{q}}}(a^{\dagger}_{-q}+a_{q})$$

Then $u_{\ell}$ expressed as

$$u_{\ell} = \sum_{q} \sqrt {\frac {\hbar} {2MN\omega_{q}}} (a_{q} e^{iqa\ell} + a^{\dagger}_{q} e^{-iqa\ell})$$

Hence, using the continuum model, the displacement operator for the 3-dimensional case is

$$u(r) = \sum_{q} \sqrt{ \frac {\hbar}{2M N \omega_{q} } } e_{q} [ a_{q} e^{ i q \cdot r} + a^{\dagger}_{q} e^{-i q \cdot r}  ]$$,

where $e_{q}$ is the unit vector along the displacement direction.

== Interaction Hamiltonian ==
The electron-longitudinal acoustic phonon interaction Hamiltonian is defined as $H_\text{el}$

$$H_\text{el} = D_\text{ac} \frac{\delta V}{V} = D_\text{ac} \, \mathop{\rm div} \, u(r)$$,

where $D_\text{ac}$ is the deformation potential for electron scattering by acoustic phonons.

Inserting the displacement vector to the Hamiltonian results to

$$H_\text{el} = D_\text{ac} \sum_{q} \sqrt{ \frac {\hbar} {2 M N \omega_{q} } } ( i e_{q} \cdot q ) [ a_{q} e^{i q \cdot r} - a^{\dagger}_{q} e^{-i q \cdot r} ]$$

== Scattering probability ==
The scattering probability for electrons from $|k \rangle$ to $|k' \rangle$ states is

$$P(k,k') = \frac {2 \pi} {\hbar} \mid \langle k' , q' | H_\text{el}| \ k , q \rangle \mid ^ {2} \delta [ \varepsilon (k') - \varepsilon (k) \mp \hbar \omega_{q} ]$$

$$= \frac {2 \pi} {\hbar} \left| D_\text{ac} \sum_{q} \sqrt{ \frac {\hbar} {2 M N \omega_{q} } } ( i e_{q} \cdot q ) \sqrt { n_{q} + \frac {1} {2} \mp \frac {1} {2} } \, \frac {1} {L^{3}} \int d^{3} r \, u^{\ast}_{k'} (r) u_{k} (r) e^{i ( k - k' \pm q )  \cdot r } \right|^2 \delta [ \varepsilon (k') - \varepsilon (k) \mp \hbar \omega_{q} ]$$

Replace the integral over the whole space with a summation of unit cell integrations

$$P(k,k') = \frac {2 \pi} {\hbar} \left( D_\text{ac} \sum_{q} \sqrt{ \frac {\hbar} {2 M N \omega_{q} } } | q | \sqrt { n_{q} + \frac {1} {2} \mp \frac {1} {2} } \, I(k,k') \delta_{k' , k \pm q } \right)^2 \delta [ \varepsilon (k') - \varepsilon (k) \mp \hbar \omega_{q} ],$$

where $I(k,k') = \Omega \int_{\Omega} d^{3}r \, u^{\ast}_{k'} (r) u_{k} (r)$, $\Omega$ is the volume of a unit cell.

$$P(k,k') = \begin{cases}
\frac {2 \pi} {\hbar} D_\text{ac}^2 \frac {\hbar} {2 M N \omega_{q} } | q |^2 n_{q} & (k' = k + q ; \text{absorption}), \\
\frac {2 \pi} {\hbar} D_\text{ac}^2 \frac {\hbar} {2 M N \omega_{q} } | q |^2 ( n_{q} + 1 ) & (k' = k - q ; \text{emission}).
\end{cases}$$

== See also ==
- Phonon scattering
- Umklapp scattering
- Polaron
