= Wide-bandgap semiconductor =

Semiconductor materials with a larger band gap

Wide-bandgap semiconductors (also known as WBG semiconductors or WBGSs) are semiconductor materials which have a larger band gap than conventional semiconductors. Whereas conventional semiconductors like silicon, germanium (due to a slightly wider bandgap than silicon), and selenium have a bandgap in the range of 0.7 – 1.5 electronvolt (eV), wide-bandgap materials have bandgaps in the range above 2 eV. Generally, wide-bandgap semiconductors have electronic properties which fall in between those of conventional semiconductors and electrical (not thermal) insulators.

Wide-bandgap semiconductors allow devices to operate at much higher voltages, frequencies, and temperatures than conventional semiconductor materials like silicon, germanium, and gallium arsenide. They are the key component used to make short-wavelength (green-UV) LEDs or lasers, and are also used in certain radio frequency applications, notably military radars. Their intrinsic qualities make them suitable for a wide range of other applications, and they are one of the leading contenders for next-generation devices for general semiconductor use.

The wider bandgap is particularly important for allowing devices that use them to operate at much higher temperatures, on the order of 300 °C. This makes them highly attractive for military applications, where they have seen a fair amount of use. The high temperature tolerance also means that these devices can be operated at much higher power levels under normal conditions. Additionally, most wide-bandgap materials also have a much higher critical electrical field density, on the order of ten times that of conventional semiconductors. Combined, these properties allow them to operate at much higher voltages and currents, which makes them highly valuable in military, radio, and power conversion applications. The US Department of Energy believes they will be a foundational technology in new electrical grid and alternative energy devices, as well as the robust and efficient power components used in high-power vehicles from plug-in electric vehicles to electric trains. Most wide-bandgap materials also have high free-electron velocities, which allows them to work at higher switching speeds, which adds to their value in radio applications. A single WBG device can be used to make a complete radio system, eliminating the need for separate signal and radio-frequency components, while operating at higher frequencies and power levels.

Research and development of wide-bandgap materials lags behind that of conventional semiconductors, which have received massive investment since the 1970s. However, their advantages in many applications, combined with some unique properties not found in conventional semiconductors, has led to increasing interest in their use in everyday electronic devices instead of silicon. Their ability to handle higher power density is particularly attractive for attempts to sustain Moore's law – the observed steady rate of increase in the density of transistors on an integrated circuit, which has, over decades, doubled roughly every two years. Conventional technologies, however, appear to be reaching a plateau of transistor density.

== Use in devices ==
Wide-bandgap materials have several characteristics that make them useful compared to narrower bandgap materials. The higher energy gap gives devices the ability to operate at higher temperatures, as bandgaps typically shrink with increasing temperature, which can be problematic when using conventional semiconductors. For some applications, wide-bandgap materials allow devices to switch larger voltages. The wide bandgap also brings the electronic transition energy into the range of the energy of visible light, and hence light-emitting devices such as light-emitting diodes (LEDs) and semiconductor lasers can be made that emit in the visible spectrum, or even produce ultraviolet radiation.

Solid-state lighting using wide-bandgap semiconductors has the potential to reduce the amount of energy required to provide lighting compared with incandescent lights, which have a luminous efficacy of less than 20 lumens per watt. The efficacy of LEDs is on the order of 160 lumens per watt.

Wide-bandgap semiconductors can also be used in RF signal processing. Silicon-based power transistors are reaching limits of operating frequency, breakdown voltage, and power density. Wide-bandgap materials can be used in high-temperature and power switching applications.

== Materials ==
The only wide bandgap materials in group IV are diamond and silicon carbide (SiC).

The only semiconducting material in group III is boron, with a wider bandgap than silicon, selenium, and germanium.

There are many III–V and II–VI compound semiconductors with wide bandgaps. In the III-V semiconductor family, aluminium nitride (AlN) is used to fabricate ultraviolet LEDs with wavelengths down to 200–250 nm, gallium nitride (GaN) is used to make blue LEDs and laser diodes, and boron nitride (BN) is proposed for blue LEDs.

=== Table of common wide-bandgap semiconductors ===
Group	Elem.	Material	Formula	Band gap (eV)	Gap type	Description
IV	1	Diamond	C	5.47	indirect	Excellent thermal conductivity. Superior mechanical and optical properties.
III	2	Boron	B	>2	indirect	Pure crystalline boron is a black, lustrous semiconductor; i.e., it conducts electricity like a metal at high temperatures and is almost an insulator at low temperatures. It is hard enough (9.3 on Mohs scale) to scratch some abrasives, such as carborundum, but too brittle for use in tools. It constitutes about 0.001 percent by weight of Earth's crust. Boron occurs combined as borax, kernite, and tincalconite (hydrated sodium borates), the major commercial boron minerals, especially concentrated in the arid regions of California, and as widely dispersed minerals such as colemanite, ulexite, and tourmaline. Sassolite—natural boric acid—occurs especially in Italy.
IV	2	Silicon carbide	SiC	2.3-3.3	indirect	Bandgap varies depending on the crystal structure, 3C-SiC, 4H-SiC, or 6H-SiC. Used for high-voltage and high-temperature applications, and for early yellow and blue LEDs.
III-V	2	Boron nitride	BN	5.96-6.36	indirect	Bandgaps listed are for cubic or hexagonal crystal structures respectively. Potentially useful for ultraviolet LEDs.
III-V	2	Aluminium phosphide	AlP	2.45	indirect	
III-V	2	Aluminium arsenide	AlAs	2.16	indirect	
III-V	2	Aluminium nitride	AlN	6.0	direct	AlN is one of the few materials that have both a wide and direct bandgap (almost twice that of SiC and GaN) and large thermal conductivity. This is due to its small atomic mass, strong interatomic bonds, and simple crystal structure.
III-V	2	Gallium nitride	GaN	3.44	direct	p-doping with Mg and annealing allowed first high-efficiency blue LEDs and blue lasers. GaN transistors can operate at higher voltages and temperatures than GaAs, used in microwave power amplifiers. When doped with, e.g., manganese, it becomes a magnetic semiconductor.
III-V	2	Gallium phosphide	GaP	2.26	indirect	Used in early low- to medium-brightness cheap red/orange/green LEDs. Employed standalone or with GaAsP. Transparent for yellow and red light, used as a substrate for GaAsP red/yellow LEDs. Doped with S or Te for n-type, with Zn for p-type. Pure GaP emits green; nitrogen-doped GaP emits yellow-green; ZnO-doped GaP emits red.
II-VI	2	Cadmium sulfide	CdS	2.42	direct	Used in photoresistors and solar cells; CdS/Cu_{2}S was the first efficient solar cell. Also used in solar cells with CdTe. Common as quantum dots. Crystals can act as solid-state lasers. Electroluminescent. When doped, can act as a phosphor.
II-VI, oxide	2	Zinc oxide	ZnO	3.37	direct	Photocatalytic. Band gap is tunable from 3 to 4 eV by alloying with magnesium oxide and cadmium oxide. Intrinsic n-type; p-type doping is difficult. Heavy aluminium, indium, or gallium doping yields transparent conductive coatings; ZnO:Al is used as window coatings transparent in visible and reflective in infrared regions, and as conductive films in LCD displays and solar panels as a replacement for indium tin oxide. Resistant to radiation damage. Possible use in LEDs and laser diodes; potential for random lasers.
II-VI	2	Zinc selenide	ZnSe	2.7	direct	Used for blue lasers and LEDs. Easy to n-type dope; p-type doping is difficult but achievable with, e.g., nitrogen. Common optical material in infrared optics.
II-VI	2	Zinc sulfide	ZnS	3.54/3.91	direct	Band gap 3.54 eV (cubic), 3.91 (hexagonal). Can be doped both n-type and p-type. Common scintillator/phosphor when suitably doped.
II-VI	2	Zinc telluride	ZnTe	2.3	direct	Can be grown on AlSb, GaSb, InAs, and PbSe. Used in solar cells, components of microwave generators, blue LEDs and lasers, and in electrooptics. Combined with lithium niobate to generate terahertz radiation.
Oxide	2	Copper(I) oxide	Cu_{2}O	2.17		One of the most studied semiconductors. Many applications and effects were first demonstrated with it. Formerly used in rectifier diodes before silicon.
Oxide	2	Tin dioxide	SnO_{2}	3.7		Oxygen-deficient n-type semiconductor. Used in gas sensors and as a transparent conductor.
Layered	2	Gallium selenide	GaSe	2.1	indirect	Photoconductor. Utilized in nonlinear optics and as a 2D-material. Air sensitive.

== Materials properties ==
=== Bandgap ===
Quantum mechanics gives rise to a series of distinct electron energy levels, or bands, that vary from material to material. Each band can hold a certain number of electrons; if the atom has more electrons then they are forced into higher energy bands. In the presence of external energy, some of the electrons will gain energy and move back up the energy bands, before releasing it and falling back down to a lower band. With the constant application of external energy, like the thermal energy present at room temperature, an equilibrium is reached where the population of electrons moving up and down the bands is equal.

Depending on the distribution of the energy bands, and the "band gap" between them, the materials will have very different electrical properties. For instance, at room temperature most metals have a series of partially filled bands that allow electrons to be added or removed with little applied energy. When tightly packed together, electrons can easily move from atom to atom, making them excellent conductors. In comparison, most plastic materials have widely spaced energy levels that require considerable energy to move electrons between their atoms, making them natural insulators. Semiconductors are those materials that have both types of bands, and at normal operational temperatures, some electrons are in both bands.

In semiconductors, adding a small amount of energy pushes more electrons into the conduction band, making them more conductive and allowing current to flow like a conductor. Reversing the polarity of this applied energy pushes the electrons into the more widely separated bands, making them insulators and stopping the flow. Since the amount of energy needed to push the electrons between these two levels is very small, semiconductors allow switching with very little energy input. However, this switching process depends on the electrons being naturally distributed between the two states, so small inputs cause the population statistics to change rapidly. As the external temperature changes, due to the Maxwell–Boltzmann distribution, more and more electrons will normally find themselves in one state or the other, causing the switching action to occur on its own, or stop entirely.

The size of the atoms and the number of protons in the atom are the primary predictors of the strength and layout of the bandgaps. Materials with small atoms and strong atomic bonds are associated with wide bandgaps. With regard to III-V compounds, nitrides are associated with the largest bandgaps. Bandgaps can be engineered by alloying, and Vegard's law states that there is a linear relation between lattice constant and composition of a solid solution at constant temperature. The position of the conduction band minima versus maxima in the band structure determine whether a bandgap is direct or indirect, where direct bandgap materials absorb light strongly, and indirect bandgaps absorb less strongly. Likewise, direct bandgap material emit light strongly, while indirect bandgap semiconductor are poor light emitters, unless dopants are added which couple strongly to light.

=== Optical properties ===
The connection between the wavelength and the bandgap is that the energy of the bandgap is the minimum energy that is needed to excite an electron into the conduction band. In order for an unassisted photon to cause this excitation, it must have at least that much energy. In the opposite process, when excited electron-hole pairs undergo recombination, photons are generated with energies that correspond to the magnitude of the bandgap.

The bandgap determines the wavelength at which LEDs emit light and the wavelength at which photovoltaics operate most efficiently. Wide-bandgap devices therefore are useful at shorter wavelengths than other semiconductor devices. The bandgap for GaAs of 1.4 eV, for example, corresponds to a wavelength of approximately 890 nm, which is infrared light (the equivalent wavelength for light energy can be determined by dividing the constant 1240 nm-eV by the energy in eV, so 1240 nm-eV/1.4 eV=886 nm). Since the highest efficiency would be produced from a photovoltaic cell with layers tuned to the different regions of the solar spectrum, modern multi-junction solar cells have multiple layers with different bandgaps, and wide-bandgap semiconductors are a key component for collecting the part of the spectrum beyond the infrared.

The use of LEDs in lighting applications depends particularly on the development of wide-bandgap nitride semiconductors.

=== Breakdown field ===
Impact ionization is often attributed to be the cause of breakdown. At the point of breakdown, electrons in a semiconductor are associated with sufficient kinetic energy to produce carriers when they collide with lattice atoms.

Wide-bandgap semiconductors are associated with a high breakdown voltage. This is due to a larger electric field required to generate carriers through impact.

At high electric fields, drift velocity saturates due to scattering from optical phonons. A higher optical phonon energy results in fewer optical photons at a particular temperature, and there are therefore fewer scattering centers, and electrons in wide-bandgap semiconductors can achieve high peak velocities.

The drift velocity reaches a peak at an intermediate electric field and undergoes a small drop at higher fields. Intervalley scattering is an additional scattering mechanism at large electric fields, and it is due to a shift of carriers from the lowest valley of the conduction band to the upper valleys, where the lower band curvature raises the effective mass of the electrons and lowers electron mobility. The drop in drift velocity at high electric fields due to intervalley scattering is small in comparison to high saturation velocity that results from low optical phonon scattering. There is therefore an overall higher saturation velocity.

=== Thermal properties ===
Silicon and other common materials have a bandgap on the order of 1 to 1.5 electronvolt (eV), which implies that such semiconductor devices can be controlled by relatively low voltages. However, it also implies that they are more readily activated by thermal energy, which interferes with their proper operation. This limits silicon-based devices to operational temperatures below about 100 °C, beyond which the uncontrolled thermal activation of the devices makes it difficult for them to operate correctly. Wide-bandgap materials typically have bandgaps on the order of 2 to 4 eV, allowing them to operate at much higher temperatures on the order of 300 °C. This makes them highly attractive in military applications, where they have seen a fair amount of use.

Melting temperatures, thermal expansion coefficients, and thermal conductivity can be considered to be secondary properties that are essential in processing, and these properties are related to the bonding in wide-bandgap materials. Strong bonds result in higher melting temperatures and lower thermal expansion coefficients. A high Debye temperature results in a high thermal conductivity. With such thermal properties, heat is easily removed.

== Applications ==
=== High-power applications ===
The high breakdown voltage of wide-bandgap semiconductors is a useful property in high-power applications that require large electric fields.

Devices for high power and high temperature applications have been developed. Both gallium nitride and silicon carbide are robust materials well suited for such applications. Due to its robustness and ease of manufacture, silicon carbide semiconductors are expected to be used widely, creating simpler and higher efficiency charging for hybrid and all-electric vehicles, reducing energy loss, constructing longer-lasting solar and wind energy power converters, and eliminating bulky grid substation transformers. Cubic boron nitride is used as well. Most of these are for specialist applications in space programmes and military systems. They have not begun to displace silicon from its leading place in the general power semiconductor market.

=== Light-emitting diodes ===
White LEDs have replaced incandescent bulbs in many situations because of their greater brightness and longer life. The next generation of DVD players (Blu-ray and HD DVD formats) use GaN-based violet lasers.

=== Transducers ===
Large piezoelectric effects allow wide-bandgap materials to be used as transducers.

=== High-electron-mobility transistor ===
Very high speed GaN uses the phenomenon of high interface-charge densities.

Due to its cost, aluminium nitride is so far used mostly in military applications.

== Important wide-bandgap semiconductors ==
- Aluminium nitride
- Boron nitride, h-BN and c-BN can form UV-LEDs.
- Diamond
- Gallium nitride
- Silicon carbide
- Silicon dioxide

== See also ==
- Direct and indirect band gaps
- Semiconductor device
- List of semiconductor materials
