= Zhu Jun =

Zhu Jun or Jun Zhu may refer to:

- Zhu Jun (Han dynasty) (died 195), Han dynasty general and official
- Zhu Jun (fencer) (born 1984), Chinese foil fencer
- Zhu Jun (host), Chinese TV host
- Zhu Jun (businessman) (born 1966), Chinese businessman and chairman of Shanghai Shenhua F.C.
- Jun Zhu (statistician), American statistician and entomologist
- Jun Zhu (physicist), Chinese-American condensed matter physicist
