= Polymorphs of silicon carbide =

Many compound materials exhibit polymorphism, that is they can exist in different structures called polymorphs. Silicon carbide (SiC) is unique in this regard as more than 250 polymorphs of silicon carbide had been identified by 2006, with some of them having a lattice constant as long as 301.5 nm, about one thousand times the usual SiC lattice spacings.

The polymorphs of SiC include various amorphous phases observed in thin films and fibers, as well as a large family of similar crystalline structures called polytypes. They are variations of the same chemical compound that are identical in two dimensions and differ in the third. Thus, they can be viewed as layers stacked in a certain sequence. The atoms of those layers can be arranged in three configurations, A, B or C, to achieve closest packing. The stacking sequence of those configurations defines the crystal structure, where the unit cell is the shortest periodically repeated sequence of the stacking sequence. This description is not unique to SiC, but also applies to other binary tetrahedral materials, such as zinc oxide and cadmium sulfide.

== Categorizing the polytypes ==
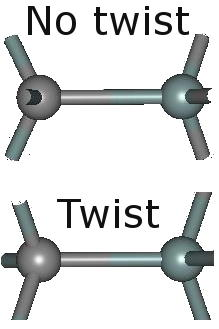

A shorthand has been developed to catalogue the vast number of possible polytype crystal structures: Let us define three SiC bilayer structures (that is 3 atoms with two bonds in between in the illustrations below) and label them as A, B and C. Elements A and B do not change the orientation of the bilayer (except for possible rotation by 120°, which does not change the lattice and is ignored hereafter); the only difference between A and B is shift of the lattice. Element C, however, twists the lattice by 60°.

Structure of major SiC polytypes.

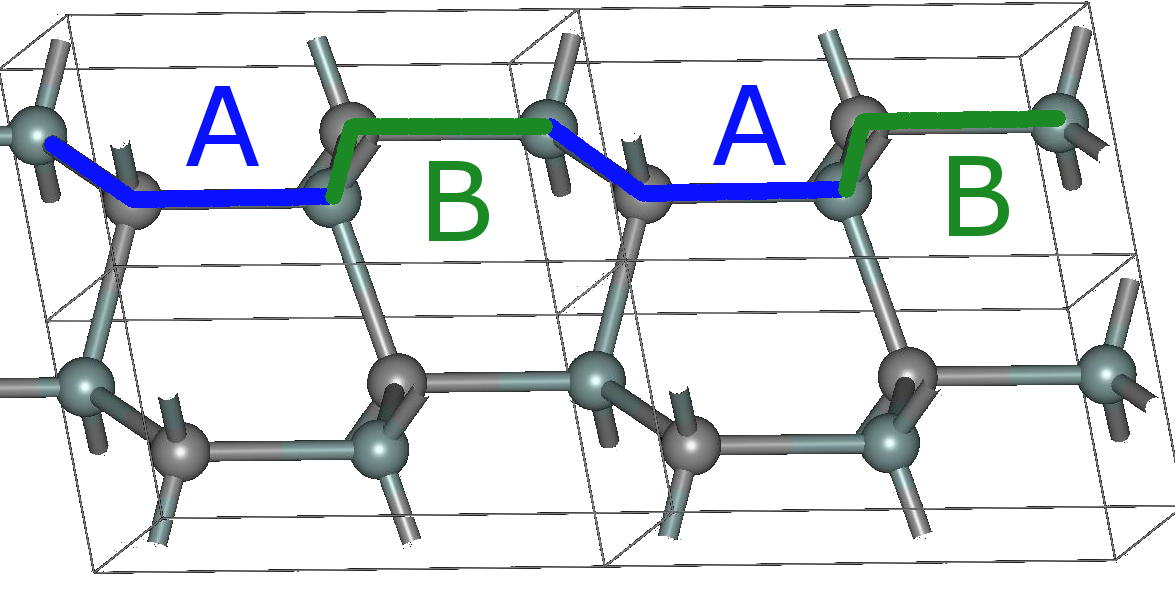
2H-SiC

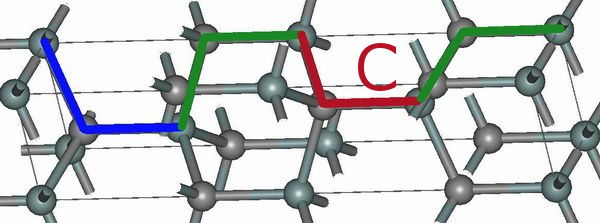
4H-SiC

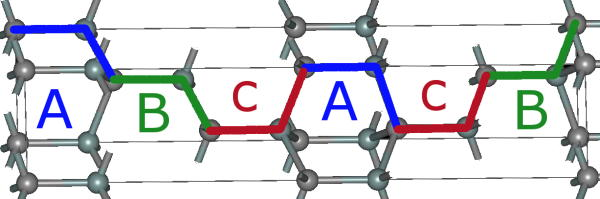
6H-SiC

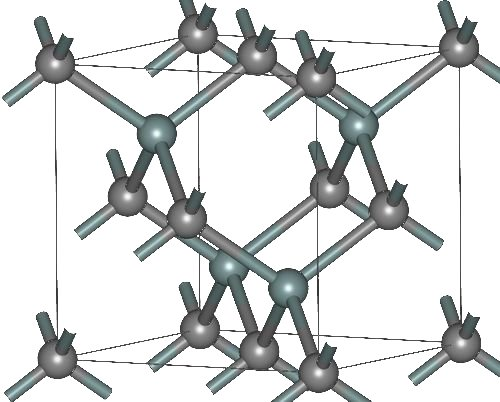
3C structure

Using those A,B,C elements, we can construct any SiC polytype. Shown above are examples of the hexagonal polytypes 2H, 4H and 6H as they would be written in the Ramsdell notation where the number indicates the layer and the letter indicates the Bravais lattice. The 2H-SiC structure is equivalent to that of wurtzite and is composed of only elements A and B stacked as ABABAB. The 4H-SiC unit cell is two times longer, and the second half is twisted compared to 2H-SiC, resulting in ABCB stacking. The 6H-SiC cell is three times longer than that of 2H, and the stacking sequence is ABCACB. The cubic 3C-SiC, also called β-SiC, has ABC stacking.

== Physical properties ==
The different polytypes have widely ranging physical properties. 3C-SiC has the highest electron mobility and saturation velocity because of reduced phonon scattering resulting from the higher symmetry. The band gaps differ widely among the polytypes ranging from 2.3 eV for 3C-SiC to 3 eV in 6H SiC to 3.3 eV for 2H-SiC. In general, the greater the wurtzite component, the larger the band gap. Among the SiC polytypes, 6H is most easily prepared and best studied, while the 3C and 4H polytypes are attracting more attention for their superior electronic properties. The polytypism of SiC makes it nontrivial to grow single-phase material, but it also offers some potential advantages - if crystal growth methods can be developed sufficiently then heterojunctions of different SiC polytypes can be prepared and applied in electronic devices.

== Summary of polytypes ==
All symbols in the SiC structures have a specific meaning: The number 3 in 3C-SiC refers to the three-bilayer periodicity of the stacking (ABC) and the letter C denotes the cubic symmetry of the crystal. 3C-SiC is the only possible cubic polytype. The wurtzite ABAB... stacking sequence is denoted as 2H-SiC, indicating its two-bilayer stacking periodicity and hexagonal symmetry. This periodicity doubles and triples in 4H- and 6H-SiC polytypes. The family of rhombohedral polytypes is labeled R, for example, 15R-SiC.

Properties of major SiC polytypes (Z is number of atoms per unit cell)
Poly- type	Space group		Z	Pearson symbol	lattice constants		Bandgap (eV)	Hexago- nality (%)
Poly- type	Name	No	Z	Pearson symbol	a (Å)	c (Å)	Bandgap (eV)	Hexago- nality (%)
3C	$\mathrm{T^2_d\mbox{-}F43m}$	216	2	cF8	4.3596	4.3596	2.3	0
2H	$\mathrm{C^4_{6v}\mbox{-}P6_3mc}$	186	4	hP4	3.0730	5.0480	3.3	100
4H	$\mathrm{C^4_{6v}\mbox{-}P6_3mc}$	186	8	hP8	3.0730	10.053	3.2	50
6H	$\mathrm{C^4_{6v}\mbox{-}P6_3mc}$	186	12	hP12	3.0730	15.11	3.0	33.3
8H	$\mathrm{C^4_{6v}\mbox{-}P6_3mc}$	186	16	hP16	3.0730	20.147	2.86	25
10H	$\mathrm{P3m1}$	156	10	hP20	3.0730	25.184	2.8	20
19H	$\mathrm{P3m1}$	156	19	hP38	3.0730	47.8495		
21H	$\mathrm{P3m1}$	156	21	hP42	3.0730	52.87		
27H	$\mathrm{P3m1}$	156	27	hP54	3.0730	67.996		
36H	$\mathrm{P3m1}$	156	36	hP72	3.0730	90.65		
9R	$\mathrm{C^5_{3v}\mbox{-}R3m}$	160	9	hR18	3.037	22.603	3.233	66.6
15R	$\mathrm{C^5_{3v}\mbox{-}R3m}$	160	15	hR30	3.0730	37.7	3.0	40
21R	$\mathrm{C^5_{3v}\mbox{-}R3m}$	160	21	hR42	3.0730	52.89	2.85	28.5
24R	$\mathrm{C^5_{3v}\mbox{-}R3m}$	160	24	hR48	3.0730	60.49	2.73	25
27R	$\mathrm{C^5_{3v}\mbox{-}R3m}$	160	27	hR54	3.0730	67.996	2.73	44
33R	$\mathrm{C^5_{3v}\mbox{-}R3m}$	160	33	hR66	3.0730	83.11		36.3
45R	$\mathrm{C^5_{3v}\mbox{-}R3m}$	160	45	hR90	3.0730	113.33		40
51R	$\mathrm{C^5_{3v}\mbox{-}R3m}$	160	51	hR102	3.0730	128.437		35.3
57R	$\mathrm{C^5_{3v}\mbox{-}R3m}$	160	57	hR114	3.0730	143.526		
66R	$\mathrm{C^5_{3v}\mbox{-}R3m}$	160	66	hR132	3.0730	166.188		36.4
75R	$\mathrm{C^5_{3v}\mbox{-}R3m}$	160	75	hR150	3.0730	188.88		
84R	$\mathrm{C^5_{3v}\mbox{-}R3m}$	160	84	hR168	3.0730	211.544		
87R	$\mathrm{C^5_{3v}\mbox{-}R3m}$	160	87	hR174	3.0730	219.1		
93R	$\mathrm{C^5_{3v}\mbox{-}R3m}$	160	93	hR186	3.0730	234.17		
105R	$\mathrm{C^5_{3v}\mbox{-}R3m}$	160	105	hR210	3.0730	264.39		
111R	$\mathrm{C^5_{3v}\mbox{-}R3m}$	160	111	hR222	3.0730	279.5		
120R	$\mathrm{C^5_{3v}\mbox{-}R3m}$	160	120	hR240	3.0730	302.4		
141R	$\mathrm{C^5_{3v}\mbox{-}R3m}$	160	141	hR282	3.0730	355.049		
189R	$\mathrm{C^5_{3v}\mbox{-}R3m}$	160	189	hR378	3.0730	476.28		
393R	$\mathrm{C^5_{3v}\mbox{-}R3m}$	160	393	hR786	3.0730	987.60		

== See also ==
- Silicon carbide fibers
- Silicon carbide
- Silicon carbide photonics
