= Harish Bhaskaran =

Engineer and academic

- Citizenship: United Kingdom
- Known for: Nanoscale devices, photonic computing, smart materials
- Awards: Optica Fellow (2025); Fellow of the Royal Academy of Engineering (FREng) (2023); Fellow of the Institution of Mechanical Engineers (FIMechE) (2021)

Academic background
- Education: BE in Civil Engineering, MS in Mechanical Engineering, PhD
- Alma mater: College of Engineering Pune; University of Maryland, College Park
- Doctoral advisor: Keith Schwab

Academic work
- Discipline: Electrical and Materials Engineering
- Institutions: University of Oxford

Harish Bhaskaran FREng is a British-Indian engineer and academic whose work focuses on nanoscale systems, including photonic computing, memory devices, and smart materials. He is a Professor of Applied Nanomaterials at the University of Oxford and the founder of the university's Advanced Nanoscale Engineering Group. As of 2025, he is Director of Exploratory Design at Apple Inc.

== Education ==
Bhaskaran completed a Bachelor of Engineering in civil engineering at the College of Engineering, Pune. He earned a Master of Science in mechanical engineering at the University of Maryland, College Park, where he studied the packaging of microelectromechanical systems (MEMS). He then completed the PhD in Mechanical Engineering from the same University advised by Keith Schwab.

== Career ==
After his PhD in nano mechanics at the University of Maryland, Bhaskaran began his research career at IBM Research – Zurich, where he worked on phase-change materials and atomic force microscopy (AFM) technologies. His work included the development of platinum silicide (PtSi) AFM probes and silicon-containing diamond-like carbon tips with ultralow wear properties.

He later conducted postdoctoral research at Yale University, before joining the faculty at the University of Exeter as a lecturer. In 2013, he moved to the University of Oxford, where he established the Advanced Nanoscale Engineering Group and was appointed Professor of Applied Nanomaterials in 2016. At Oxford, he has taught nanomaterials, nanoengineering, and innovation and entrepreneurship.

Bhaskaran served as director of the Oxford Fab, and, as of 2023, is the Associate Head for Research in Oxford's Mathematical, Physical and Life Sciences Division. In 2025, he assumed a role at Apple Inc.

== Research ==
Bhaskaran’s research spans nanomaterials, photonic computing, and neuromorphic devices. He has contributed to the development of adaptive smart window coatings that modulate infrared radiation, offering potential energy savings in buildings.

His group has also developed memory and display technologies using phase-change materials. He is a co-founder of Bodle Technologies, which was developing low-power reflective displays, and Salience Labs, which focuses on photonic computing.

Bhaskaran is one of the inventors of photonic non-volatile memory, and contributed to the development of integrated photonic tensor cores capable of parallel convolutional operations for machine learning applications.

He has also collaborated with visual artist Méadhbh O’Connor to create art that intersects with engineering. alt-space was created as a long-form art project as a consequence and presented online and in art exhibitions, both at Wolfson College and elsewhere, with some of his work being inspired by the art of calligraphy.

== Honours and recognition ==
- Optica Fellow (2025)
- Elected Fellow of the Royal Academy of Engineering (2023)
- Fellow of the Institution of Mechanical Engineers (IMechE) (2021)
- EPSRC Manufacturing Fellow (2012)
