= Silicon carbide fibers =

Synthetic fiber

Silicon carbide fibers are fibers ranging from 5 to 150 micrometres in diameter and composed primarily of silicon carbide molecules. Depending on manufacturing process, they may have some excess silicon or carbon, or have a small amount of oxygen. Relative to organic fibers and some ceramic fibers, silicon carbide fibers have high stiffness, high tensile strength, low weight, high chemical resistance, high temperature tolerance and low thermal expansion. (refs) These properties have made silicon carbide fiber the choice for hot section components in the next generation of gas turbines, e.g. the LEAP engine from GE (General Electric).

== Manufacture ==
There are several manufacturing approaches to making silicon carbide fibers. The one with the longest historical experience, invented in 1975 and called the Yajima process, uses a pre-ceramic liquid polymer that is injected through a spinneret to produce solidified green (unfired) fibers that go through a series of processing steps, including significant time in high temperature furnaces to convert the polymer to the desired SiC chemistry. These fibers are typically smaller than 20 microns in diameter and supplied as twisted tows containing 300+ fibers. Several companies employ some variation of this technique, including Nippon Carbon (Japan), Ube Industries (Japan), and the NGS consortium (USA).

A second approach utilizes chemical vapor deposition (CVD) to form silicon carbide on a central core of a dissimilar material as the core traverses a high temperature reactor. Developed by Textron (now Specialty Materials Inc located in Massachusetts) over 40 years ago, the silicon carbide deposit resulting from the gas-phase CVD reaction builds up on a carbon core with a columnar microstructure. The fiber, sold as the SCS product family, is relatively large in diameter, measuring from approximately 80 to 140 microns.

Laser-driven CVD (LCVD) is a related approach using multiple laser beams as the energy source to incite the gas phase reaction, with the significant difference that the fibers are grown as-formed and not on any core structure, The LCVD fibers are fabricated in a parallel array as each laser beam corresponds to a deposited fiber, with growth rates ranging from 100 microns to over 1 millimeter per second and fiber diameters ranging from 20 to 80 microns. Free Form Fibers, based in upstate New York, has developed the LCVD technology for the past 10 years.

== Usage ==
Almost all silicon carbide fiber produced is used as a fiber reinforcement material in ceramic composites. The majority are used to produce metal matrix composites, such as aluminum, titanium, or molybdenum composites. They can also be used to make various ceramic matrix composites such as SiC/SiC, a high temperature composite used in aerospace.

Silicon carbide (SiC) fibers are used in aerospace, automotive, and defense for high-strength, heat-resistant components like engine parts and armor. They reinforce composites in turbines and nuclear reactors, improve medical devices, and enhance electronics with superior thermal conductivity.

== See also ==
- Polymorphs of silicon carbide
