= Electron mobility =

Quantity in solid-state physics

In solid-state physics, the electron mobility characterizes how quickly an electron can move through a metal or semiconductor when pushed or pulled by an electric field. There is an analogous quantity for holes, called hole mobility. The term carrier mobility refers in general to both electron and hole mobility.

Electron and hole mobility are special cases of electrical mobility of charged particles in a fluid under an applied electric field.

When an electric field E is applied across a piece of material, the electrons respond by moving with an average velocity called the drift velocity, $v_d$. Then the electron mobility μ is defined as
$$v_d = \mu E.$$

Electron mobility is almost always specified in units of cm^{2}/(V⋅s). This is different from the SI unit of mobility, m^{2}/(V⋅s). They are related by 1 m^{2}/(V⋅s) = 10^{4} cm^{2}/(V⋅s).

Conductivity is proportional to the product of mobility and carrier concentration. For example, the same conductivity could come from a small number of electrons with high mobility for each, or a large number of electrons with a small mobility for each. For semiconductors, the behavior of transistors and other devices can be very different depending on whether there are many electrons with low mobility or few electrons with high mobility. Therefore mobility is a very important parameter for semiconductor materials. Almost always, higher mobility leads to better device performance, with other things equal.

Semiconductor mobility depends on the impurity concentrations (including donor and acceptor concentrations), defect concentration, temperature, and electron and hole concentrations. It also depends on the electric field, particularly at high fields when velocity saturation occurs. It can be determined by the Hall effect, or inferred from transistor behavior.

== Introduction ==
=== Drift velocity in an electric field ===
In a solid conductor or semiconductor without an applied electric field, conduction band electrons and holes are in equilibrium and have no preferred direction for their motion. The Boltzmann transport equation (BTE) indicates zero net transport (separately for both electrons and holes).

However, when an electric field is applied, each electron or hole is accelerated by the electric field. If the electron were in a vacuum, it would be accelerated to ever-increasing velocity (called ballistic transport). However, in a solid, the electron repeatedly scatters off crystal defects, phonons, impurities, etc., so that it loses some energy and changes direction. The final result is that the electron moves with a finite average velocity, called the drift velocity. This net electron motion is usually much slower than the normally occurring random motion.

The two charge carriers, electrons and holes, will typically have different drift velocities for the same electric field.

Quasi-ballistic transport is possible in solids if the electrons are accelerated across a very small distance (as small as the mean free path), or for a very short time (as short as the mean free time). In these cases, drift velocity and mobility are not meaningful.

=== Definition and units ===
The electron mobility is defined by the equation:
$$v_d = \mu_e E.$$
where:

- E is the magnitude of the electric field applied to a material,
- v_{d} is the magnitude of the electron drift velocity (in other words, the electron drift speed) caused by the electric field, and
- μ_{e} is the electron mobility.

The hole mobility is defined by a similar equation:
$$v_d = \mu_h E.$$
Both electron and hole mobilities are positive by definition.

Usually, the electron drift velocity in a material is directly proportional to the electric field, which means that the electron mobility is a constant (independent of the electric field). When this is not true (for example, in very large electric fields), mobility depends on the electric field.

The SI unit of velocity is m/s, and the SI unit of electric field is V/m. Therefore the SI unit of mobility is (m/s)/(V/m) = m^{2}/(V⋅s). However, mobility is much more commonly expressed in cm^{2}/(V⋅s) = 10^{−4} m^{2}/(V⋅s).

Mobility is usually a strong function of material impurities and temperature, and is determined empirically. Mobility values are typically presented in table or chart form. Mobility is also different for electrons and holes in a given material.

=== Derivation ===
Starting with Newton's second law:
$$a = F/m_e^*$$
where:

- a is the acceleration between collisions.
- F is the electric force exerted by the electric field, and
- $m_e^*$ is the effective mass of an electron.

Since the force on the electron is −eE:
$$a = -\frac{eE}{m_e^*}$$

This is the acceleration on the electron between collisions. The drift velocity is therefore:
$$v_d = a \tau_c = -\frac{e\tau_c}{m_e^*}E,$$
where $\tau_c$ is the mean free time

Since we only care about how the drift velocity changes with the electric field, we lump the loose terms together to get
$$v_d = -\mu_e E,$$
where $\mu_e = \frac{e\tau_c}{m_e^*}$

Similarly, for holes we have
$$v_d = \mu_h E,$$
where $\mu_h = \frac{e\tau_c}{m_h^*}$ Note that both electron mobility and hole mobility are positive. A minus sign is added for electron drift velocity to account for the minus charge.

=== Relation to current density ===
The drift current density resulting from an electric field can be calculated from the drift velocity. Consider a sample with cross-sectional area A, length l and an electron concentration of n. The current carried by each electron must be $-e v_d$, so that the total current density due to electrons is given by:
$$J_e=\frac{I_n}{A} = - e n v_d$$
Using the expression for $v_d$ gives
$$J_e = e n\mu_e E$$
A similar set of equations applies to the holes, (noting that the charge on a hole is positive). Therefore the current density due to holes is given by
$$J_h =e p \mu_h E$$
where p is the hole concentration and $\mu_h$ the hole mobility.

The total current density is the sum of the electron and hole components:
$$J=J_e+J_h=(en\mu_e+ep\mu_h)E$$

=== Relation to conductivity ===
We have previously derived the relationship between electron mobility and current density
$$J=J_e+J_h=(en\mu_e+ep\mu_h)E$$
Now Ohm's law can be written in the form
$$J=\sigma E$$
where $\sigma$ is defined as the conductivity. Therefore we can write down:
$$\sigma=en\mu_e+ep\mu_h$$
which can be factorised to
$$\sigma=e(n\mu_e+p\mu_h)$$

=== Relation to electron diffusion ===
In a region where n and p vary with distance, a diffusion current is superimposed on that due to conductivity. This diffusion current is governed by Fick's law:
$$F=-D_\text{e}\nabla n$$
where:

- F is flux.
- D_{e} is the diffusion coefficient or diffusivity
- $\nabla n$ is the concentration gradient of electrons

The diffusion coefficient for a charge carrier is related to its mobility by the Einstein relation. For a classical system (e.g. Boltzmann gas), it reads:
$$D_\text{e} = \frac{\mu_\text{e} k_\mathrm{B} T}{e}$$
where:

- k_{B} is the Boltzmann constant
- T is the absolute temperature
- e is the electric charge of an electron

For a metal, described by a Fermi gas (Fermi liquid), the quantum version of the Einstein relation should be used. Typically, temperature is much smaller than the Fermi Energy, in which case one should use the following formula:
$$D_\text{e} = \frac{\mu_\text{e} E_\text{F}}{e}$$
where:

- E_{F} is the Fermi energy

== Examples ==
Typical electron mobility at room temperature (300 K) in metals like gold, copper and silver is 30–50 cm^{2}/(V⋅s). Carrier mobility in semiconductors is doping dependent. In silicon (Si) the electron mobility is of the order of 1,000, in germanium around 4,000, and in gallium arsenide up to 10,000 cm^{2}/(V⋅s).

Hole mobilities are generally lower and range from around 100 cm^{2}/(V⋅s) in gallium arsenide, to 450 in silicon, and 2,000 in germanium.

Very high mobility has been found in several ultrapure low-dimensional systems, such as two-dimensional electron gases (2DEG) (35,000,000 cm^{2}/(V⋅s) at low temperature), carbon nanotubes (100,000 cm^{2}/(V⋅s) at room temperature) and freestanding graphene (200,000 cm^{2}/(V⋅s) at low temperature).

Organic semiconductors (polymer, oligomer) developed thus far have carrier mobilities below 50 cm^{2}/(V⋅s), and typically below 1, with well performing materials measured below 10.

List of highest measured mobilities
Material	Mobility (cm^{2}/(V⋅s))	
Material	Electron	Hole
AlGaAs/GaAs heterostructures	35,000,000	5,800,000
Freestanding graphene	200,000	
Carbon nanotubes	79,000	
Cubic boron arsenide (c-BAs)	1,600	>1000
Crystalline silicon	1,400	450
Polycrystalline silicon	100	
Metals (Al, Au, Cu, Ag)	10–50	
2D material (MoS_{2})	10–50	
Organics	8.6	43
Amorphous silicon	~1	

== Electric field dependence and velocity saturation ==
At low fields, the drift velocity v_{d} is proportional to the electric field E, so mobility μ is constant. This value of μ is called the low-field mobility.

As the electric field is increased, however, the carrier velocity increases sublinearly and asymptotically towards a maximum possible value, called the saturation velocity v_{sat}. For example, the value of v_{sat} is on the order of 1×10^{7} cm/s for both electrons and holes in Si. It is on the order of 6×10^{6} cm/s for Ge. This velocity is a characteristic of the material and a strong function of doping or impurity levels and temperature. It is one of the key material and semiconductor device properties that determine a device such as a transistor's ultimate limit of speed of response and frequency.

This velocity saturation phenomenon results from a process called optical phonon scattering. At high fields, carriers are accelerated enough to gain sufficient kinetic energy between collisions to emit an optical phonon, and they do so very quickly, before being accelerated once again. The velocity that the electron reaches before emitting a phonon is:
$$\frac{m^* v_\text{emit}^2}{2} \approx \hbar \omega_\text{phonon (opt.)}$$
where ω_{phonon(opt.)} is the optical-phonon angular frequency and m* the carrier effective mass in the direction of the electric field. The value of E_{phonon (opt.)} is 0.063 eV for Si and 0.034 eV for GaAs and Ge. The saturation velocity is only one-half of v_{emit}, because the electron starts at zero velocity and accelerates up to v_{emit} in each cycle. (This is a somewhat oversimplified description.)

Velocity saturation is not the only possible high-field behavior. Another is the Gunn effect, where a sufficiently high electric field can cause intervalley electron transfer, which reduces drift velocity. This is unusual; increasing the electric field almost always increases the drift velocity, or else leaves it unchanged. The result is negative differential resistance.

In the regime of velocity saturation (or other high-field effects), mobility is a strong function of electric field. This means that mobility is a somewhat less useful concept, compared to simply discussing drift velocity directly.

== Relation between scattering and mobility ==
Recall that by definition, mobility is dependent on the drift velocity. The main factor determining drift velocity (other than effective mass) is scattering time, i.e. how long the carrier is ballistically accelerated by the electric field until it scatters (collides) with something that changes its direction and/or energy. The most important sources of scattering in typical semiconductor materials, discussed below, are ionized impurity scattering and acoustic phonon scattering (also called lattice scattering). In some cases other sources of scattering may be important, such as neutral impurity scattering, optical phonon scattering, surface scattering, and defect scattering.

Elastic scattering means that energy is (almost) conserved during the scattering event. Some elastic scattering processes are scattering from acoustic phonons, impurity scattering, piezoelectric scattering, etc. In acoustic phonon scattering, electrons scatter from state k to k', while emitting or absorbing a phonon of wave vector q. This phenomenon is usually modeled by assuming that lattice vibrations cause small shifts in energy bands. The additional potential causing the scattering process is generated by the deviations of bands due to these small transitions from frozen lattice positions.

=== Ionized impurity scattering ===
Semiconductors are doped with donors and/or acceptors, which are typically ionized, and are thus charged. The Coulombic forces will deflect an electron or hole approaching the ionized impurity. This is known as ionized impurity scattering. The amount of deflection depends on the speed of the carrier and its proximity to the ion. The more heavily a material is doped, the higher the probability that a carrier will collide with an ion in a given time, and the smaller the mean free time between collisions, and the smaller the mobility. When determining the strength of these interactions due to the long-range nature of the Coulomb potential, other impurities and free carriers cause the range of interaction with the carriers to reduce significantly compared to bare Coulomb interaction.

If these scatterers are near the interface, the complexity of the problem increases due to the existence of crystal defects and disorders. Charge trapping centers that scatter free carriers form in many cases due to defects associated with dangling bonds. Scattering happens because after trapping a charge, the defect becomes charged and therefore starts interacting with free carriers. If scattered carriers are in the inversion layer at the interface, the reduced dimensionality of the carriers makes the case differ from the case of bulk impurity scattering as carriers move only in two dimensions. Interfacial roughness also causes short-range scattering limiting the mobility of quasi-two-dimensional electrons at the interface.

=== Lattice (phonon) scattering ===
At any temperature above absolute zero, the vibrating atoms create pressure (acoustic) waves in the crystal, which are termed phonons. Like electrons, phonons can be considered to be particles. A phonon can interact (collide) with an electron (or hole) and scatter it. At higher temperature, there are more phonons, and thus increased electron scattering, which tends to reduce mobility.

=== Piezoelectric scattering ===
Piezoelectric effect can occur only in compound semiconductor due to their polar nature. It is small in most semiconductors but may lead to local electric fields that cause scattering of carriers by deflecting them, this effect is important mainly at low temperatures where other scattering mechanisms are weak. These electric fields arise from the distortion of the basic unit cell as strain is applied in certain directions in the lattice.

=== Surface roughness scattering ===
Surface roughness scattering caused by interfacial disorder is short range scattering limiting the mobility of quasi-two-dimensional electrons at the interface. From high-resolution transmission electron micrographs, it has been determined that the interface is not abrupt on the atomic level, but actual position of the interfacial plane varies one or two atomic layers along the surface. These variations are random and cause fluctuations of the energy levels at the interface, which then causes scattering.

=== Alloy scattering ===
In compound (alloy) semiconductors, which many thermoelectric materials are, scattering caused by the perturbation of crystal potential due to the random positioning of substituting atom species in a relevant sublattice is known as alloy scattering. This can only happen in ternary or higher alloys as their crystal structure forms by randomly replacing some atoms in one of the sublattices (sublattice) of the crystal structure. Generally, this phenomenon is quite weak but in certain materials or circumstances, it can become dominant effect limiting conductivity. In bulk materials, interface scattering is usually ignored.

=== Inelastic scattering ===
During inelastic scattering processes, significant energy exchange happens. As with elastic phonon scattering also in the inelastic case, the potential arises from energy band deformations caused by atomic vibrations. Optical phonons causing inelastic scattering usually have the energy in the range 30-50 meV, for comparison energies of acoustic phonon are typically less than 1 meV but some might have energy in order of 10 meV. There is significant change in carrier energy during the scattering process. Optical or high-energy acoustic phonons can also cause intervalley or interband scattering, which means that scattering is not limited within single valley.

=== Electron–electron scattering ===
Due to the Pauli exclusion principle, electrons can be considered as non-interacting if their density does not exceed the value 10^{16} ~ 10^{17} cm^{−3} or electric field value 10^{3} V/cm. However, significantly above these limits electron–electron scattering starts to dominate. Long range and nonlinearity of the Coulomb potential governing interactions between electrons make these interactions difficult to deal with.

=== Relation between mobility and scattering time ===
A simple model gives the approximate relation between scattering time (average time between scattering events) and mobility. It is assumed that after each scattering event, the carrier's motion is randomized, so it has zero average velocity. After that, it accelerates uniformly in the electric field, until it scatters again. The resulting average drift mobility is:
$$\mu = \frac{q}{m^*}\overline{\tau}$$
where q is the elementary charge, m* is the carrier effective mass, and τ̅ is the average scattering time.

If the effective mass is anisotropic (direction-dependent), m* is the effective mass in the direction of the electric field.

=== Matthiessen's rule ===
Normally, more than one source of scattering is present, for example both impurities and lattice phonons. It is normally a very good approximation to combine their influences using "Matthiessen's Rule" (developed from work by Augustus Matthiessen in 1864):

$$\frac{1}{\mu} = \frac{1}{\mu_{\rm impurities}} + \frac{1}{\mu_{\rm lattice}}.$$
where μ is the actual mobility, $\mu_{\rm impurities}$ is the mobility that the material would have if there was impurity scattering but no other source of scattering, and $\mu_{\rm lattice}$ is the mobility that the material would have if there was lattice phonon scattering but no other source of scattering. Other terms may be added for other scattering sources, for example
$$\frac{1}{\mu} = \frac{1}{\mu_{\rm impurities}} + \frac{1}{\mu_{\rm lattice}} + \frac{1}{\mu_{\rm defects}} + \cdots.$$
Matthiessen's rule can also be stated in terms of the scattering time:
$$\frac{1}{\tau} = \frac{1}{\tau_{\rm impurities}} + \frac{1}{\tau_{\rm lattice}} + \frac{1}{\tau_{\rm defects}} + \cdots .$$
where τ is the true average scattering time and τ_{impurities} is the scattering time if there was impurity scattering but no other source of scattering, etc.

Matthiessen's rule is an approximation and is not universally valid. This rule is not valid if the factors affecting the mobility depend on each other, because individual scattering probabilities cannot be summed unless they are independent of each other. The average free time of flight of a carrier and therefore the relaxation time is inversely proportional to the scattering probability. For example, lattice scattering alters the average electron velocity (in the electric-field direction), which in turn alters the tendency to scatter off impurities. There are more complicated formulas that attempt to take these effects into account.

=== Temperature dependence of mobility ===
Typical temperature dependence of mobility
	Si	Ge	GaAs
Electrons	∝ T^{−2.4}	∝ T^{−1.7}	∝ T^{−1.0}
Holes	∝ T^{−2.2}	∝ T^{−2.3}	∝ T^{−2.1}

With increasing temperature, phonon concentration increases and causes increased scattering. Thus lattice scattering lowers the carrier mobility more and more at higher temperature. Theoretical calculations reveal that the mobility in non-polar semiconductors, such as silicon and germanium, is dominated by acoustic phonon interaction. The resulting mobility is expected to be proportional to T ^{−3/2}, while the mobility due to optical phonon scattering only is expected to be proportional to T ^{−1/2}. Experimentally, values of the temperature dependence of the mobility in Si, Ge and GaAs are listed in table.

As $\frac{1}{\tau }\propto \left \langle v\right \rangle\Sigma$, where $\Sigma$ is the scattering cross section for electrons and holes at a scattering center and $\left \langle v\right \rangle$ is a thermal average (Boltzmann statistics) over all electron or hole velocities in the lower conduction band or upper valence band, temperature dependence of the mobility can be determined. In here, the following definition for the scattering cross section is used: number of particles scattered into solid angle dΩ per unit time divided by number of particles per area per time (incident intensity), which comes from classical mechanics. As Boltzmann statistics are valid for semiconductors $\left \langle v\right \rangle\sim\sqrt{T}$.

For scattering from acoustic phonons, for temperatures well above Debye temperature, the estimated cross section Σ_{ph} is determined from the square of the average vibrational amplitude of a phonon to be proportional to T. The scattering from charged defects (ionized donors or acceptors) leads to the cross section ${\Sigma }_\text{def}\propto {\left \langle v\right \rangle}^{-4}$. This formula is the scattering cross section for "Rutherford scattering", where a point charge (carrier) moves past another point charge (defect) experiencing Coulomb interaction.

The temperature dependencies of these two scattering mechanism in semiconductors can be determined by combining formulas for τ, Σ and $\left \langle v\right \rangle$, to be for scattering from acoustic phonons $\mu_\text{ph} \sim T^{-3/2}$ and from charged defects ${\mu }_\text{def}\sim T^{3/2}$.

The effect of ionized impurity scattering, however, decreases with increasing temperature because the average thermal speeds of the carriers are increased. Thus, the carriers spend less time near an ionized impurity as they pass and the scattering effect of the ions is thus reduced.

These two effects operate simultaneously on the carriers through Matthiessen's rule. At lower temperatures, ionized impurity scattering dominates, while at higher temperatures, phonon scattering dominates, and the actual mobility reaches a maximum at an intermediate temperature.

== Disordered Semiconductors ==
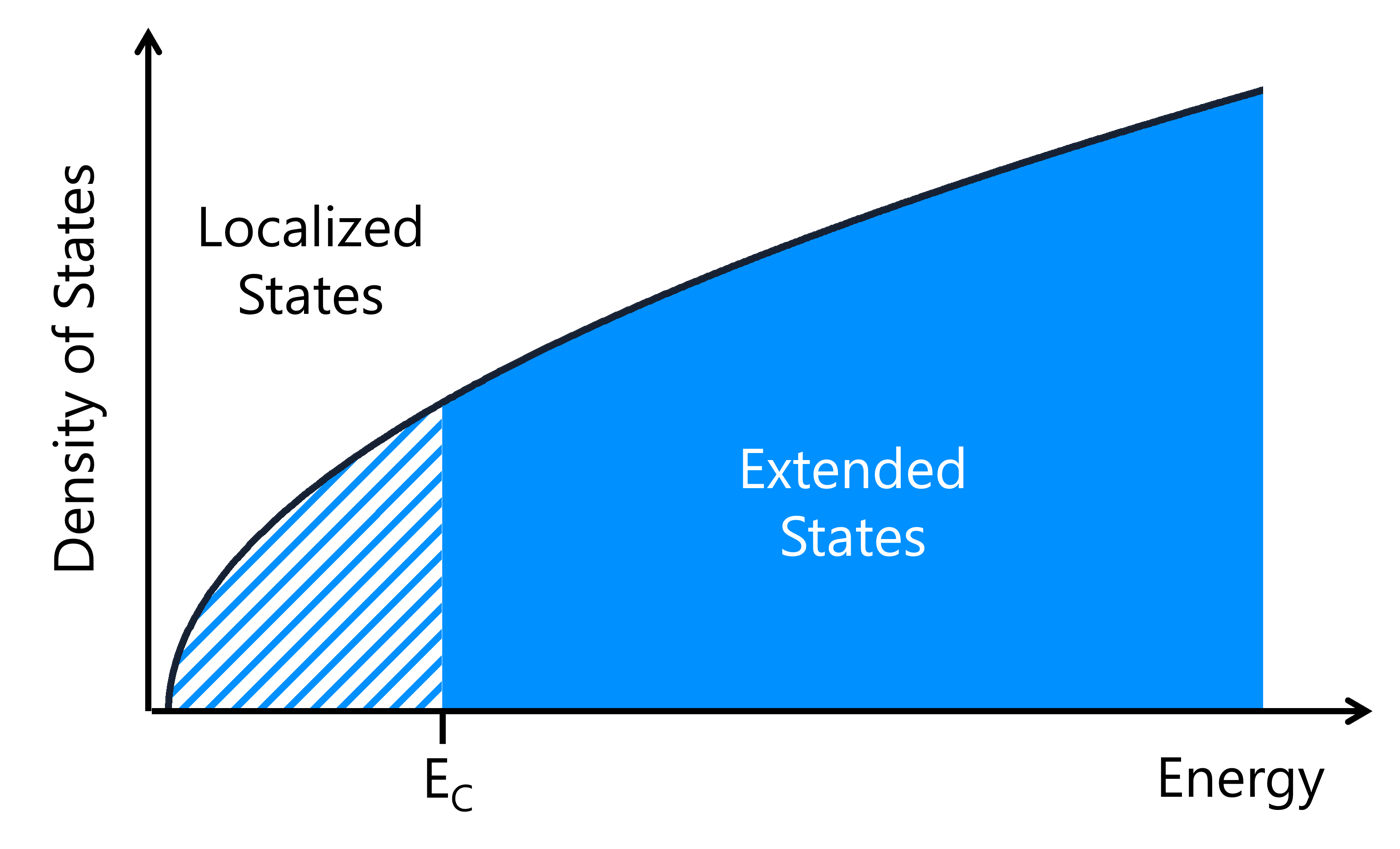
Density of states of a solid possessing a mobility edge, $E_{C}$.

While in crystalline materials electrons can be described by wavefunctions extended over the entire solid, this is not the case in systems with appreciable structural disorder, such as polycrystalline or amorphous semiconductors. Anderson suggested that beyond a critical value of structural disorder, electron states would be localized. Localized states are described as being confined to finite region of real space, normalizable, and not contributing to transport. Extended states are spread over the extent of the material, not normalizable, and contribute to transport. Unlike crystalline semiconductors, mobility generally increases with temperature in disordered semiconductors.

=== Multiple trapping and release ===
Mott later developed the concept of a mobility edge. This is an energy $E_{C}$, above which electrons undergo a transition from localized to delocalized states. In this description, termed multiple trapping and release, electrons are only able to travel when in extended states, and are constantly being trapped in, and re-released from, the lower energy localized states. Because the probability of an electron being released from a trap depends on its thermal energy, mobility can be described by an Arrhenius relationship in such a system:

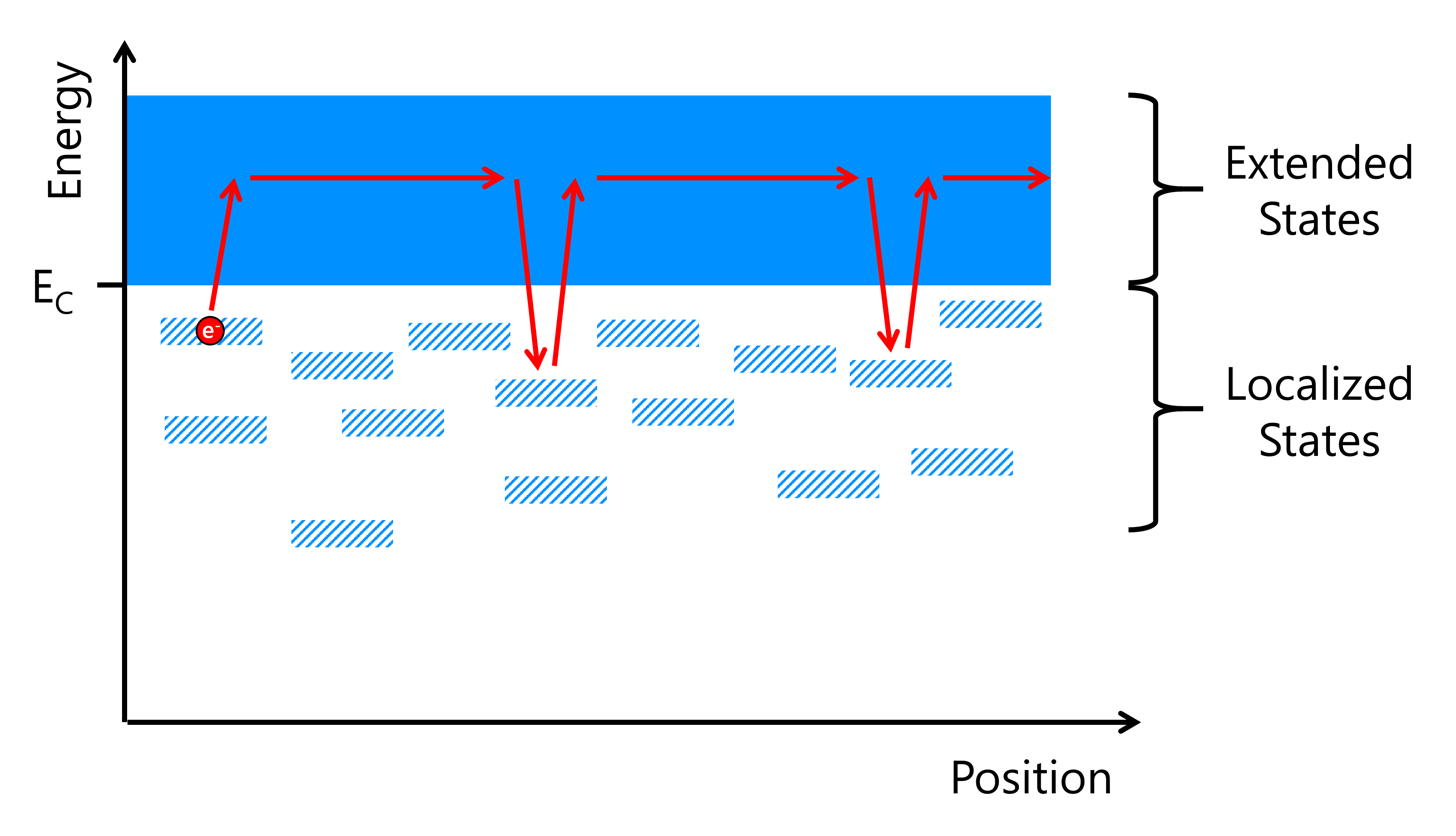
Energy band diagram depicting electron transport under multiple trapping and release.

$$\mu=\mu_{0}\exp\left(-\frac{E_\text{A}}{k_\text{B}T}\right)$$

where $\mu_{0}$ is a mobility prefactor, $E_\text{A}$ is activation energy, $k_\text{B}$ is the Boltzmann constant, and $T$ is temperature. The activation energy is typically evaluated by measuring mobility as a function of temperature. The Urbach Energy can be used as a proxy for activation energy in some systems.

=== Variable Range Hopping ===
At low temperature, or in system with a large degree of structural disorder (such as fully amorphous systems), electrons cannot access delocalized states. In such a system, electrons can only travel by tunnelling for one site to another, in a process called variable range hopping. In the original theory of variable range hopping, as developed by Mott and Davis, the probability $P_{ij}$, of an electron hopping from one site $i$, to another site $j$, depends on their separation in space $r_{ij}$, and their separation in energy $\Delta E_{ij}$.

$$P_{ij} = P_{0} \exp\left(-2\alpha r_{ij} - \frac{\Delta E_{ij}}{k_\text{B} T}\right)$$

Here $P_{0}$ is a prefactor associated with the phonon frequency in the material, and $\alpha$ is the wavefunction overlap parameter. The mobility in a system governed by variable range hopping can be shown to be:

$$\mu=\mu_{0} \exp \left(-\left [ \frac{T_0}{T} \right ]^{1/(d+1)}\right)$$

where $\mu_{0}$ is a mobility prefactor, $T_{0}$ is a parameter (with dimensions of temperature), and $d$ is the dimensionality of the system. In the theory developed by Mott, $T_0 = \beta / \left(k_\mathrm{B} \, g(E_F) \, \alpha^3\right)$, where $g(E_F)$ denotes the density of states at the Fermi level and $\beta$ is a dimensionless numerical factor.

== Measurement of semiconductor mobility ==
=== Hall mobility ===
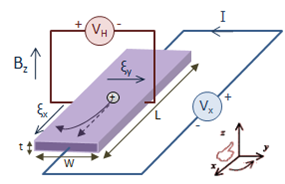
Hall effect measurement setup for holes

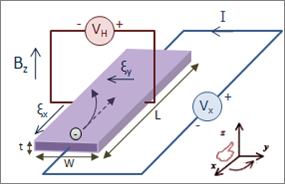
Hall effect measurement setup for electrons

Carrier mobility is most commonly measured using the Hall effect. The result of the measurement is called the "Hall mobility" (meaning "mobility inferred from a Hall-effect measurement").

Consider a semiconductor sample with a rectangular cross section as shown in the figures, a current is flowing in the x-direction and a magnetic field is applied in the z-direction. The resulting Lorentz force will accelerate the electrons (n-type materials) or holes (p-type materials) in the (−y) direction, according to the right hand rule and set up an electric field ξ_{y}. As a result there is a voltage across the sample, which can be measured with a high-impedance voltmeter. This voltage, V_{H}, is called the Hall voltage. V_{H} is negative for n-type material and positive for p-type material.

Mathematically, the Lorentz force acting on a charge q is given by

For electrons:
$$\mathbf F_{Hn} = -q \, \mathbf v_n \times \mathbf B_z$$

For holes:
$$\mathbf F_{Hp} = +q \, \mathbf v_p \times \mathbf B_z$$

In steady state this force is balanced by the force set up by the Hall voltage, so that there is no net force on the carriers in the y direction. For electrons,

$$\begin{align}
\mathbf F_y = (-q)\xi_y + (-q)\, \mathbf v_n \times \mathbf B_z &= 0 \\
\Longrightarrow -q\xi_y + q v_x B_z &= 0 \\
\xi_y &= v_x B_z
\end{align}$$

For electrons, the field points in the −y direction, and for holes, it points in the +y direction.

The electron current I is given by $I = -qnv_xtW$. Sub v_{x} into the expression for ξ_{y},

$$\xi_y = -\frac{IB}{nqtW} = +\frac{R_{Hn}IB}{tW}$$

where R_{Hn} is the Hall coefficient for electron, and is defined as
$$R_{Hn} = -\frac{1}{nq}$$

Since $\xi_y = \frac{V_H}{W}$
$$R_{Hn} = -\frac{1}{nq} = \frac{V_{Hn}t}{IB}$$

Similarly, for holes
$$R_{Hp} = \frac{1}{pq} = \frac{V_{Hp}t}{IB}$$

From the Hall coefficient, we can obtain the carrier mobility as follows:
$$\begin{align}
\mu_n &= \left(-nq\right) \mu_n \left(-\frac{1}{nq}\right) \\
&= -\sigma_n R_{Hn} \\
&= -\frac{\sigma_n V_{Hn} t}{IB}
\end{align}$$

Similarly,
$$\mu_p = \frac{\sigma_p V_{Hp}t}{IB}$$

Here the value of V_{Hp} (Hall voltage), t (sample thickness), I (current) and B (magnetic field) can be measured directly, and the conductivities σ_{n} or σ_{p} are either known or can be obtained from measuring the resistivity.

=== Field-effect mobility ===
The mobility can also be measured using a field-effect transistor (FET). The result of the measurement is called the "field-effect mobility" (meaning "mobility inferred from a field-effect measurement").

The measurement can work in two ways: From saturation-mode measurements, or linear-region measurements. (See MOSFET for a description of the different modes or regions of operation.)

==== Using saturation mode ====
In this technique, for each fixed gate voltage V_{GS}, the drain-source voltage V_{DS} is increased until the current I_{D} saturates. Next, the square root of this saturated current is plotted against the gate voltage, and the slope m_{sat} is measured. Then the mobility is:
$$\mu = m_\text{sat}^2 \frac{2L}{W} \frac{1}{C_i}$$
where L and W are the length and width of the channel and C_{i} is the gate insulator capacitance per unit area. This equation comes from the approximate equation for a MOSFET in saturation mode:
$$I_\text{D} = \frac{\mu C_i}{2} \frac{W}{L} \left(V_\text{GS} - V_\text{th}\right)^2.$$
where V_{th} is the threshold voltage. This approximation ignores the Early effect (channel length modulation), among other things. In practice, this technique may underestimate the true mobility.

==== Using the linear region ====
In this technique, the transistor is operated in the linear region (or "ohmic mode"), where V_{DS} is small and $I_\text{D} \propto V_\text{GS}$ with slope m_{lin}. Then the mobility is:
$$\mu = m_\text{lin} \frac{L}{W} \frac{1}{V_\text{DS}} \frac{1}{C_i}.$$
This equation comes from the approximate equation for a MOSFET in the linear region:
$$I_\text{D} = \mu C_i \frac{W}{L} V_\text{DS} \left( V_\text{GS} - V_\text{th} - \frac{1}{2} V_\text{DS} \right)$$
In practice, this technique may overestimate the true mobility, because if V_{DS} is not small enough and V_{G} is not large enough, the MOSFET may not stay in the linear region.

=== Optical mobility ===
Electron mobility may be determined from non-contact laser photo-reflectance technique measurements. A series of photo-reflectance measurements are made as the sample is stepped through focus. The electron diffusion length and recombination time are determined by a regressive fit to the data. Then the Einstein relation is used to calculate the mobility.

=== Terahertz mobility ===
Electron mobility can be calculated from time-resolved terahertz probe measurement. Femtosecond laser pulses excite the semiconductor and the resulting photoconductivity is measured using a terahertz probe, which detects changes in the terahertz electric field.

=== Time resolved microwave conductivity (TRMC) ===
A proxy for charge carrier mobility can be evaluated using time-resolved microwave conductivity (TRMC). A pulsed optical laser is used to create electrons and holes in a semiconductor, which are then detected as an increase in photoconductance. With knowledge of the sample absorbance, dimensions, and incident laser fluence, the parameter $\phi\Sigma\mu=\phi(\mu_{e}+\mu_{h})$ can be evaluated, where $\phi$ is the carrier generation yield (between 0 and 1), $\mu_{e}$ is the electron mobility and $\mu_{h}$ is the hole mobility. $\phi\Sigma\mu$ has the same dimensions as mobility, but carrier type (electron or hole) is obscured.

== Doping concentration dependence in heavily-doped silicon ==
The charge carriers in semiconductors are electrons and holes. Their numbers are controlled by the concentrations of impurity elements, i.e. doping concentration. Thus doping concentration has great influence on carrier mobility.

While there is considerable scatter in the experimental data, for noncompensated material (no counter doping) for heavily doped substrates (i.e. $10^{18}\mathrm{cm}^{-3}$ and up), the mobility in silicon is often characterized by the empirical relationship:
$$\mu = \mu_o + \frac{\mu_1}{1 + \left(\frac{N}{N_\text{ref}}\right)^\alpha}$$
where N is the doping concentration (either N_{D} or N_{A}), and N_{ref} and α are fitting parameters. At room temperature, the above equation becomes:

Majority carriers:
$$\begin{align}
\mu_n(N_D) &= 65 + \frac{1265}{1+ \left(\frac{N_D}{8.5\times10^{16}}\right)^{0.72}} \\[1ex]
\mu_p(N_A) &= 48 + \frac{447}{1+ \left(\frac{N_A}{6.3\times10^{16}}\right)^{0.76}}
\end{align}$$

Minority carriers:
$$\begin{align}
\mu_n(N_A) &= 232 + \frac{1180}{1+ \left(\frac{N_A}{8\times10^{16}}\right)^{0.9}} \\[1ex]
\mu_p(N_D) &= 130 + \frac{370}{1+ \left(\frac{N_D}{8\times10^{17}}\right)^{1.25}}
\end{align}$$

These equations apply only to silicon, and only under low field.

== See also ==
- Speed of electricity
