= Keith Schwab =

American physicist

Keith Charles Schwab
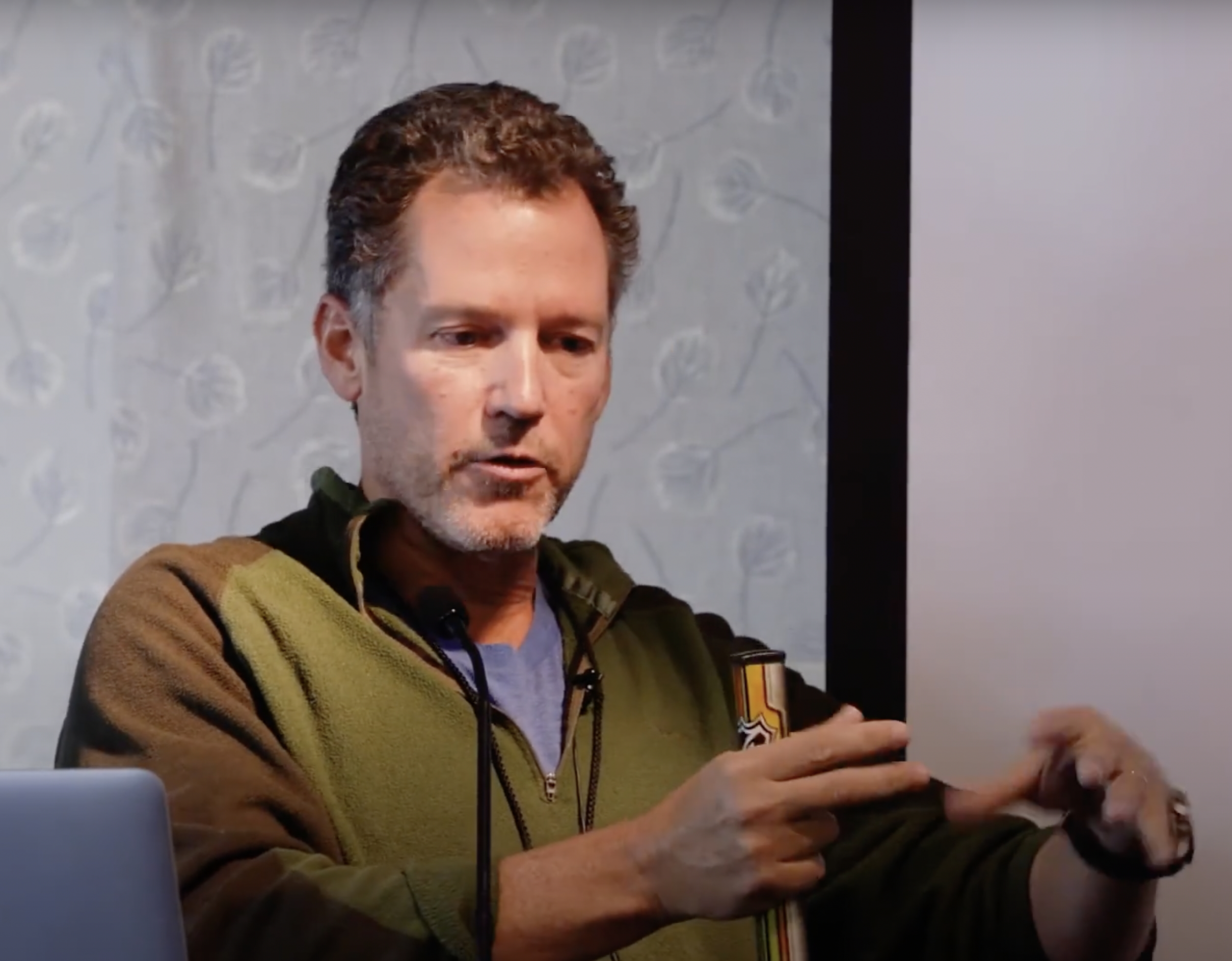
- Born: May 18, 1968 (age 58); St. Louis, Missouri, U.S.
- Education: University of California, Berkeley; University of Chicago; St. Louis University High
- Known for: Quantum-limited measurements
- Scientific career
- Fields: Physics
- Workplaces: Caltech
- Doctoral advisor: Richard Packard
- Doctoral students: Harish Bhaskaran

Keith Schwab (born May 18, 1968) is an American physicist and a professor of applied physics at the California Institute of Technology (Caltech). His contributions are in the areas of nanoscience, ultra-low temperature physics, and quantum effects.

== Biography ==
After attending St. Louis University High, Schwab received a Bachelor of Arts in physics from the University of Chicago in 1990 and a Ph.D. in physics from University of California, Berkeley in 1996. He wrote a dissertation "Experiments with Superfluid Oscillators" under advisor Richard Packard, where he demonstrated an ultra-sensitive gyroscope based on the quantum properties of superfluid helium. He joined Caltech in 1996 as a Sherman Fairchild Distinguished Postdoctoral Scholar In the group of Professor Michael Roukes. There he made the first observation of the quantum of thermal conductance which is the quantum mechanical limit for energy flow through single quantum channels An electron micrograph of the nanodevice he designed and fabricated for this work resides in the permanent collection of the Museum of Modern Art.

Schwab joined the U.S. National Security Agency in 2000 and led a group to study the quantum limits of mechanical structures, during which time he was named as a promising young innovator by Technology Review.

In 2002, Schwab was named to the MIT Technology Review TR100 as one of the top 100 innovators in the world under the age of 35. In 2005, he was named a Young Global Leader by the World Economic Forum and attended the annual meeting in Davos, Switzerland in 2005, 2007, and 2008.

In 2006, Schwab moved to Cornell as an associate professor of physics where his group focused on both the cooling of mechanical structures to near the quantum ground state, and the observation of motion which fundamentally avoids the Heisenberg Uncertainty Principle.

In 2009 he joined Caltech as a professor of applied physics. His group explores the following topics: producing squeezed states of motion, exploring ultra-low dissipation superfluid resonators, ultra-sensitive microwave detection using graphene-based bolometers, and developing wide-band parametric amplifiers. In 2014 his research group demonstrated the detection of motion which avoids the Heisenberg Uncertainty Principle and the detection of the force noise generated by the quantum zero-point energy of a microwave field. Recently, this group has produces a quantum squeezed state of motion, where the fluctuations of one quadrature of motion are below the quantum zero-point level.

== Selected publications ==
- "Mechanically Detecting and Avoiding the Quantum Fluctuations of a Microwave Field," J. Suh, A. J. Weinstein, C. U. Lei, E. E. Wollman, S. K. Steinke, P. Meystre, A. A. Clerk, K. C. Schwab, Science 344, 1262–1265 (2014.)
- "Superfluid Optomechanics: Coupling of a Superfluid to a Superconducting Condensate," LA DeLorenzo and KC Schwab, New Journal of Physics 16, 113020 (2014.)
- "Preparation and Detection of a Mechanical Resonator Near the Ground State of Motion," T. Rocheleau, T. Ndukum, C. Macklin, J.B. Hertzberg, A.A. Clerk, K.C. Schwab, Nature 463, 72-75 (2009).
- "Back-action Evading Measurements of Nanomechanical Motion," J.B. Hertzberg, T. Roucheleau, T. Ndukum, M. Savva, A.A. Clerk, K.C. Schwab, Nature Physics 6, 213-217 (2009).
- "Demonstration of an ultracold micro-optomechanical oscillator in a cryogenic cavity," Simon Groblacher, Jared B. Hertzberg, Michael R. Vanner, Garret D. Cole, Sylvain Gigan, K.C. Schwab, Markus Aspelmeyer, Nature Physics 5, 485 (2009).
- "Radio Frequency Scanning Tunneling Microscopy," U. Kemiktarak, T. Ndukum, K.C. Schwab, K.L. Ekinci, Nature 450, 85-89 (2007).
- "Information on Heat Flow" – News and Views, K. Schwab, Nature 444, 161-162 (2006).
- "Self-cooling of a micro-mirror by radiation pressure," S. Gigan, H.R. Boehm, M. Paternostro, F. Blaser, G. Langer, J. Hertzberg, K. Schwab, D. Baeuerle, M. Aspelmeyer, A. Zeilinger, Nature 444, 67-70 (2006).
- "Quantum Measurement Backaction and Cooling Observed with a Nanomechanical Resonator," A. Naik, O. Buu, M.D. LaHaye, M.P. Blencowe, A.D. Armour, A. A. Clerk, K.C. Schwab, Nature 443, 193 (2006.)
- "Ion Trap in a Semiconductor Chip," D. Stick, W.K. Hensinger, M.J. Madsen, S. Olmschenk, K. Schwab, C. Monroe, cover article Nature Physics 2, 36 (2005.)
- "Putting Mechanics into Quantum Mechanics," K.C. Schwab and M.L. Roukes, cover article Physics Today 58, 36 (2005.)
- "Approaching the Quantum Limit of a Nanomechanical Resonator," M. LaHaye, O. Buu, B. Camarota, K. Schwab, Science 304, 74 (2004).
- "Quantum Dynamics of a Cooper-Pair Box Coupled to a Micromechanical Resonator," A.D. Armour, M.P. Blencowe, and K. Schwab, Phys. Rev. Lett. 88, 148301 (2002.)
- "Measurement of the Quantum of Thermal Conductance," K. Schwab, E.A. Henriksen, J.M. Worlock, and M.L. Roukes, Nature 404, 974-977 (2000.)
- "Detection of the Earth's Rotation Using Superfluid Phase Coherence," K. Schwab, N. Bruckner, and R. E. Packard", Nature 386, pp. 585–587 (1997.)
- "Faceted Crystal Growth in Two Dimensions," B. Berge, L. Faucheux, K. Schwab, A. Libchaber, Nature 350, p. 320 (1991).
