= Lattice scattering =

Ions scattering off lattice atoms while diffusing in a lattice.

Lattice scattering is the scattering of ions by interaction with atoms in a lattice. This effect can be qualitatively understood as phonons colliding with charge carriers.

In the current quantum mechanical picture of conductivity the ease with which electrons traverse a crystal lattice is dependent on the near perfectly regular spacing of ions in that lattice. Only when a lattice contains perfectly regular spacing can the ion-lattice interaction (scattering) lead to almost transparent behavior of the lattice.

In the quantum understanding, an electron is viewed as a wave traveling through a medium. When the wavelength of the electrons is larger than the crystal spacing, the electrons will propagate freely throughout the metal without collision.

== See also ==
- Ionized impurity scattering
- Phonon scattering
