= Augustus Matthiessen =

British chemist and physicist

- Born: 2 January 1831; London, England
- Died: 6 October 1870 (aged 39); St Bartholomew's Hospital, City of London
- Education: University of Giessen
- Known for: isolation of calcium and strontium; Matthiessen's rule
- Awards: Royal Medal (1869)
- Scientific career
- Workplaces: St Mary's Hospital Medical School; St Bartholomew's Hospital
- Doctoral advisor: Johann Heinrich Buff

Augustus Matthiessen, FRS (2 January 1831 in London – 6 October 1870 in London), the son of a merchant, was a British chemist and physicist who obtained his PhD in Germany at the University of Gießen in 1852 with Johann Heinrich Buff. He then worked with Robert Bunsen at the University of Heidelberg from 1853 to 1856. His work in this period included the isolation of calcium and strontium in their pure states. He then returned to London and studied with August Wilhelm von Hofmann from 1857 at the Royal College of Chemistry, and set up his own research laboratory at 1 Torrington Place, Russell Square, London. He was elected a Fellow of the Royal Society (FRS) in 1861. He worked as a lecturer on chemistry at St Mary's Hospital, London, from 1862 to 1868, and then at St Bartholomew's Hospital, London, from 1868. His research was chiefly on the constitution of alloys and opium alkaloids. He contributed to both physics and chemistry. (Please see references below.) For his work on metals and alloys, he was awarded the Royal Society's Royal Medal in 1869.

Matthiessen committed suicide in 1870 under "severe nervous strain" and died at St Bartholomew's Hospital in the City of London. He left an estate valued at under £7,000, and his brother William Edward Matthiessen was his executor.

== Legacy ==
The Matthiessen's rule for carrier mobility probably originated from Augustus Matthiessen's study of electrical conduction of metals and alloys. (Please see references below. Note: In Matthiessen's time, the concept of "mobility" was not established yet. The modern form of Matthiessen's rule for electron mobility (or hole mobility) is actually an extension of Matthiessen's work in the 19th century by subsequent scientists.) In 1997, Rudolf de Bruyn Ouboter briefly mentioned Matthiessen's 1864 paper in a figure inside his article about Heike Kamerlingh Onnes's discovery of superconductivity (Scientific American, March 1997).

== Sources ==
- Entry for Augustus Matthiessen in Dictionary of National Biography (1903)
- Entry for Matthiesson in the Royal Society's Library and Archive catalogue's details of Fellows (accessed 20 April 2008)
- Obituary of Augustus Matthiessen in Meetings of the Royal Society (pp 615–617)
