= Michael Roukes =

American physicist

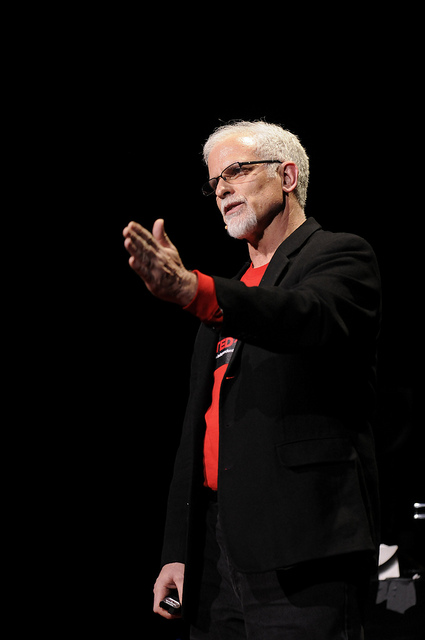
- Michael Roukes at TEDxCaltech, 1/14/11
- Education: Cornell University; UCSC
- Known for: nanoscience, nanoelectromechanical systems, nanobiotechnology, neurotechnology
- Scientific career
- Fields: Physics, Applied Physics, Bioengineering
- Workplaces: California Institute of Technology

Michael Lee Roukes is an American experimental physicist, nanoscientist, and the Frank J. Roshek Professor of Physics, Applied Physics, and Bioengineering at the California Institute of Technology (Caltech).

== Education ==
Roukes earned a B.A. degree in physics and chemistry (double majors) in 1978 at the University of California, Santa Cruz, with highest honors in both majors. He received his Ph.D. in physics from Cornell University in 1985. His graduate advisor at Cornell was Nobel Laureate Robert Coleman Richardson. Roukes' thesis research at Cornell elucidated the electron–phonon bottleneck at ultra-low temperatures; the hot electron effect that is now recapitulated in texts on solid state transport physics. In simplest terms, when electrons carry current in normal conductors, they generate heat. At low temperatures and now, in nanoscale devices at ordinary temperatures, their ability to dissipate this heat can be significantly impaired. This has generic implications for the operation of powered nanodevices.

== Research and academic career ==
After earning his Ph.D., Roukes spent seven years as a member of the technical staff and principal investigator in the Quantum Structures Research group at Bell Communications Research in New Jersey, focusing on mesoscopic physics of electron transport in nanostructures. Roukes left Bellcore to become a tenured associate professor of physics at Caltech in 1992, rising to full professorship in 1995, and subsequently became professor of physics, applied physics, and bioengineering in 2000. Upon moving to Caltech, his principal research focus changed to nanoelectromechanical systems (NEMS). As the earliest pioneer in this field, DARPA engaged Roukes to organize the first international workshop on NEMS in 1999, followed by a large international conference and school on nanoscale and molecular mechanics in 2002. The many alumni from his group continue to advance this field at major universities in the U.S. and abroad. Roukes' other research efforts at Caltech have focused on thermal properties of nanostructures, semiconductor spintronics, and, more recently, nanobiotechnology.

In 2002, Roukes was named the founding director of the Kavli Nanoscience Institute (KNI) at Caltech. After stepping down between 2006 and 2008, to focus on co-founding the international Alliance for Nanosystems VLSI (huge scale integration) and to pursue collaborative research on NEMS VLSI in connection with a Chaire d'Excellence in Nanoscience in Grenoble (with scientists at CEA/LETI-Minatec), Roukes returned as co-director of the KNI in 2008.

Roukes was named a recipient of the National Institutes of Health Director's Pioneer Award in 2010. In 2012, he was named Chevalier (Knight) of the Ordre des Palmes Académiques by the Republic of France. In 2023, he was awarded a National Institutes of Health Director's Transformative Research Award.

Among his groups' principal achievements at Bell were observation of quenching of the Hall effect in a quasi-one-dimensional wire, elucidation of electron-boundary scattering in quantum wires, invention of "anti"-dots and elucidation of commensurability effects in this system, first elucidation of chaotic transport in mesoscopic conductor, and direct measurement of the transmission matrix for a mesoscopic conductor. Among his groups' principal achievements at Caltech are development of the first nanoelectromechanical systems, measurement of the quantum of thermal conductance, first attainment of attogram mass resolution with a NEMS resonator, first measurement of nanodevice motion at microwave frequencies, discovery of the giant planar Hall effect in semiconducting ferromagnets, observation and control of a single domain wall in a ferromagnetic semiconducting wire, first demonstration of zeptogram-scale mass sensing, first coupling of a qubit to a NEMS resonator, and first demonstration of nanomechanical mass spectrometry of single protein molecules. Roukes has authored or co-authored highly cited general interest articles on nanophysics, nanoelectromechanical systems, spintronics, and quantum electromechanics.

Roukes and his collaborators have been issued 60 patents in their fields of research.

An electron micrograph of the quantum of thermal conductance device, taken by postdoc Keith Schwab and colorized by Roukes, was acquired for the permanent collection of the Museum of Modern Art in 2008.

== Events, affiliations and campaigning ==
Roukes organized TEDxCaltech: Feynman's Vision - The Next 50 Years, held on January 14, 2011, which celebrated the genius of Caltech physicist Richard Feynman in a series of forward-looking talks in the TED (conference) format. Subsequently, he organized TEDxCaltech: The Brain, which was held on January 19, 2013, at Caltech. Talks from these events can be found online.

In 2002, with three other scientists, Roukes met with, Elias Zerhouni, the director of the U.S. National Institutes of Health, and the directors of the National Cancer Institute, the National Institute of Neurological Disorders and Stroke, and several other NIH directors to propose what ultimately became the National Cancer Institute's Alliance for Nanotechnology in Cancer.

In 2011, Roukes was one of the six scientists who first advocated to the White House Office of Science and Technology Policy (OSTP) for a large-scale U.S. national neuroscience project to accelerate technology for functional connectomics. The group's concept of a Brain Activity Map project ultimately led to President Obama's BRAIN Initiative, launched in 2013. In 2016, Roukes founded the multi-institution Neurotech Alliance to disseminate state-of-the-art neurotechnology to the neuroscience research community.
