= Mean free time =

Fluid property

Molecules in a fluid constantly collide with each other. The mean free time for a molecule in a fluid is the average time between collisions. The mean free path of the molecule is the product of the average speed and the mean free time. These concepts are used in the kinetic theory of gases to compute transport coefficients such as the viscosity.

In a gas the mean free path may be much larger than the average distance between molecules. In a liquid these two lengths may be very similar.

Scattering is a random process. It is often modeled as a Poisson process, in which the probability of a collision in a small time interval $dt$ is $dt / \tau$. For a Poisson process like this, the average time since the last collision, the average time until the next collision and the average time between collisions are all equal to $\tau$.
