= Jun Zhu (physicist) =

Chinese-American condensed matter physicist

Jun Zhu is a Chinese-American experimental condensed matter physicist known for her research in valleytronics and more generally on electronic transport in two-dimensional materials, particularly graphene. She is a professor of physics at Pennsylvania State University.

== Education and career ==
Zhu graduated from the University of Science and Technology of China in 1996, and completed her Ph.D. in 2003 at Columbia University, working there with Horst Ludwig Störmer. After postdoctoral research at Cornell University, she joined the Pennsylvania State University physics department as a faculty member in 2006.

== Recognition ==
In 2020 Zhu was named a Fellow of the American Physical Society, after a nomination from the APS Division of Condensed Matter Physics, "for fundamental advances in the understanding of charge-, valley- and spin-transport in 2D materials".
