= Horst Ludwig Störmer =

German physicist

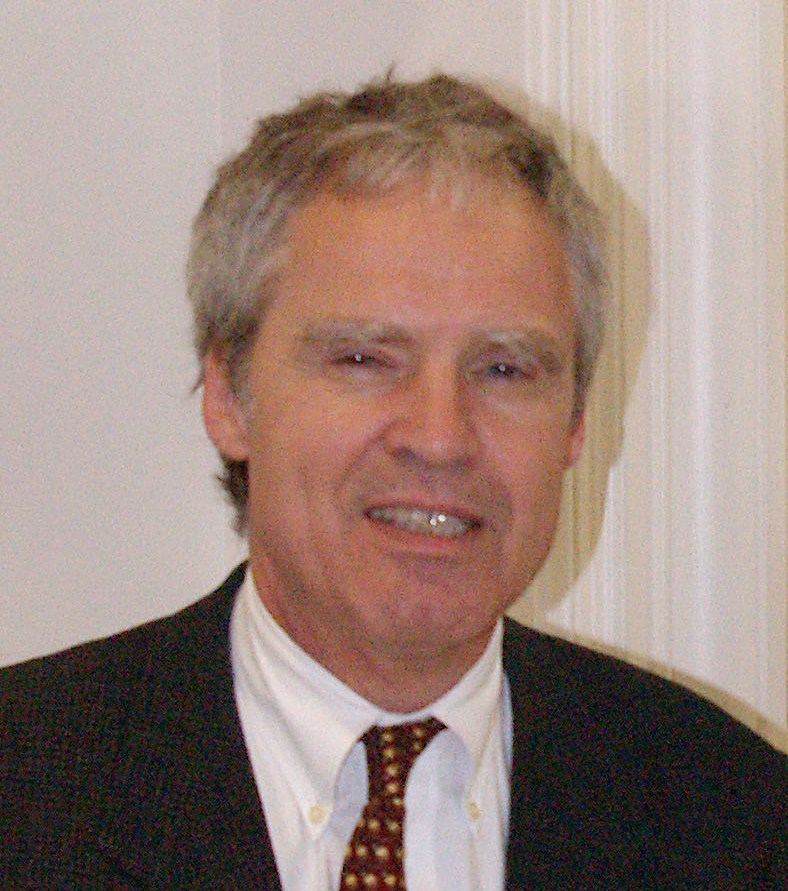
- Störmer in 1998
- Born: April 6, 1949 (age 77); Frankfurt am Main, Germany
- Education: University of Stuttgart; Goethe University Frankfurt
- Known for: Fractional quantum Hall effect
- Awards: Oliver E. Buckley Condensed Matter Prize (1984); Nobel Prize in Physics (1998); The Benjamin Franklin Medal (1998)
- Scientific career
- Fields: Physics
- Workplaces: Columbia University; Bell Labs
- Doctoral advisor: Hans-Joachim Queisser
- Doctoral students: Jun Zhu

Horst Ludwig Störmer (German pronunciation: [ˈhɔʁst ˈluːtvɪç ˈʃtœʁmɐ]; born April 6, 1949) is a German physicist, Nobel laureate and emeritus professor at Columbia University. He was awarded the 1998 Nobel Prize in Physics jointly with Daniel Tsui and Robert Laughlin "for their discovery of a new form of quantum fluid with fractionally charged excitations" (the fractional quantum Hall effect). He and Tsui were working at Bell Labs at the time of the experiment cited by the Nobel committee.

== Biography ==
Störmer was born in Frankfurt am Main, and grew up in the nearby town of Sprendlingen. After graduating from the Goetheschule in Neu-Isenburg in 1967, he enrolled in architectural engineering at the TH Darmstadt, but later moved to the Goethe University Frankfurt to study physics, but since he had missed the registration period for physics, he began with a mathematics and later changed to physics, qualifying for his Diploma in the laboratory of Werner Martienssen. Here he was supervised by Eckhardt Hoenig, and worked alongside another future Nobel laureate, Gerd Binnig.

Störmer moved to France to carry out his PhD research in Grenoble, working in a high-magnetic field laboratory which was run jointly between the French CNRS and the German Max Planck Institute for Solid State Research. Störmer's academic advisor was Hans-Joachim Queisser, and he was awarded a PhD by the University of Stuttgart in 1977 for his thesis on investigations of electron hole droplets subject to high magnetic fields. He also met his wife, Dominique Parchet, while working in Grenoble. They divorced each other a few years later.

After receiving his PhD, Störmer moved to the US to work at Bell Labs, where he carried out the research that led to his Nobel prize. After working at Bell Labs for 20 years, he became the I.I. Rabi professor of physics and applied physics at Columbia University in New York City. He was elected to the American Philosophical Society in 2006. He retired as professor emeritus in 2011.

Störmer is a naturalized US citizen.

== Research career ==
Perhaps as important as the work for which he won the Nobel prize is his invention of modulation doping, a method for making extremely high mobility two dimensional electron systems in semiconductors. This enabled the later observation of the fractional quantum Hall effect, which was discovered by Störmer and Tsui in October 1981 in an experiment carried out in the Francis Bitter High Magnetic Field Lab at the Massachusetts Institute of Technology. Within a year of the experimental discovery, Robert Laughlin was able to explain its results. Störmer, Tsui and Laughlin were jointly awarded the 1998 Nobel Prize in Physics for their work.
