= Umklapp scattering =

Scattering process outside crystals' first Brillouin zone

Figure 1.: Normal process (N-process) and Umklapp process (U-process). While the N-process conserves total phonon momentum, the U-process changes phonon momentum.

Figure 2.: k-vectors exceeding the first Brillouin zone (red) do not carry more information than their counterparts (black) in the first Brillouin zone.

In crystalline materials, Umklapp scattering (also U-process or Umklapp process) is a scattering process that results in a wave vector (usually written k) which falls outside the first Brillouin zone. If a material is periodic, it has a Brillouin zone, and any point outside the first Brillouin zone can also be expressed as a point inside the zone. So, the wave vector is then mathematically transformed to a point inside the first Brillouin zone. This transformation allows for scattering processes which would otherwise violate the conservation of momentum: two wave vectors pointing to the right can combine to create a wave vector that points to the left. This non-conservation is why crystal momentum is not a true momentum.

Examples include electron-lattice potential scattering or an anharmonic phonon-phonon (or electron-phonon) scattering process, reflecting an electronic state or creating a phonon with a momentum k-vector outside the first Brillouin zone. Umklapp scattering is one process limiting the thermal conductivity in crystalline materials, the others being phonon scattering on crystal defects and at the surface of the sample.

The left panel of Figure 1 schematically shows the possible scattering processes of two incoming phonons with wave-vectors (k-vectors) k_{1} and k_{2} (red) creating one outgoing phonon with a wave vector k_{3} (blue). As long as the sum of k_{1} and k_{2} stay inside the first Brillouin zone (grey squares), k_{3} is the sum of the former two, thus conserving phonon momentum. This process is called normal scattering (N-process).

With increasing phonon momentum and thus larger wave vectors k_{1} and k_{2}, their sum might point outside the first Brillouin zone (k'_{3}). As shown in the right panel of Figure 1, k-vectors outside the first Brillouin zone are physically equivalent to vectors inside it and can be mathematically transformed into each other by the addition of a reciprocal lattice vector G. These processes are called Umklapp scattering and change the total phonon momentum.

Umklapp scattering is the dominant process for electrical resistivity at low temperatures for low defect crystals (as opposed to phonon-electron scattering, which dominates at high temperatures, and high-defect lattices which lead to scattering at any temperature.)

Umklapp scattering is the dominant process for thermal resistivity at high temperatures for low defect crystals. The thermal conductivity for an insulating crystal where the U-processes are dominant has 1/T dependence.

== History ==
The name derives from the German verb umklappen (to turn over, to flip). Rudolf Peierls, in his autobiography Bird of Passage states he was the originator of this phrase and coined it during his 1929 crystal lattice studies under the tutelage of Wolfgang Pauli. Peierls wrote, "…I used the German term Umklapp (flip-over) and this rather ugly word has remained in use…".

The term Umklapp appears in the 1920 paper of Wilhelm Lenz's seed paper of the Ising model.

== See also ==
- Sampling theorem
