= Ionized impurity scattering =

In quantum mechanics, ionized impurity scattering is the scattering of charge carriers by ionization in the lattice. The most primitive models can be conceptually understood as a particle responding to unbalanced local charge that arises near a crystal impurity; similar to an electron encountering an electric field. This effect is the mechanism by which doping decreases mobility.

In the current quantum mechanical picture of conductivity the ease with which electrons traverse a crystal lattice is dependent on the near perfectly regular spacing of ions in that lattice. Only when a lattice contains perfectly regular spacing can the ion-lattice interaction (scattering) lead to almost transparent behavior of the lattice. Impurity atoms in a crystal have an effect similar to thermal vibrations where conductivity has a direct relationship with temperature.

A crystal with impurities is less regular than a pure crystal, and a reduction in electron mean free paths occurs. Impure crystals have lower conductivity than pure crystals with less temperature sensitivity in that lattice.

== See also ==
- Lattice scattering
