= Thermal conductance quantum =

Quantized unit of thermal conduction

In physics, the thermal conductance quantum $g_0$ describes the rate at which heat is transported through a single ballistic phonon channel with temperature $T$.

It is given by

$$g_{0} = \frac{\pi^2 {k_{\rm B}}^2 T}{3h} \approx (9.464\times10^{-13} {\rm W/K}^{2})\;T$$.

The thermal conductance of any electrically insulating structure that exhibits ballistic phonon transport is a positive integer multiple of $g_0.$ The thermal conductance quantum was first measured in 2000. These measurements employed suspended silicon nitride (Si_{3}N_{4}) nanostructures that exhibited a constant thermal conductance of 16 $g_0$ at temperatures below approximately 0.6 kelvin.

== Relation to the quantum of electrical conductance ==
For ballistic electrical conductors, the electron contribution to the thermal conductance is also quantized as a result of the electrical conductance quantum and the Wiedemann–Franz law, which has been quantitatively measured at both cryogenic (~20 mK) and room temperature (~300K).

The thermal conductance quantum, also called quantized thermal conductance, may be understood from the Wiedemann-Franz law, which shows that

$${\kappa \over \sigma} = LT,$$

where $L$ is a universal constant called the Lorenz factor,

$$L = {\pi^2 k_{\rm B}^2 \over 3e^2}.$$

In the regime with quantized electric conductance, one may have

$$\sigma = {n e^2 \over h},$$

where $n$ is an integer, also known as TKNN number. Then

$$\kappa = L T \sigma = {\pi^2 k_{\rm B}^2 \over 3e^2}\times {n e^2 \over h} T = {\pi^2 k_{\rm B}^2 \over 3h} n T = g_0 n,$$

where $g_0$ is the thermal conductance quantum defined above.

== See also ==
- Thermal transport in nanostructures
