= Arthur Gossard =

Arthur C. Gossard (June 18, 1935 – June 26, 2022) was a professor of materials and electrical engineering at the University of California, Santa Barbara. In 1982, he co-discovered the fractional quantum Hall effect. His research is related to molecular beam epitaxy (MBE). He has a doctorate in physics from UC Berkeley. After university, he joined Bell Labs.

In 1987, he was elected a member of the US National Academy of Engineering for contributions to the study of the physics of ultra-thin semiconducting layers through molecular beam epitaxy, leading to new physics and new devices. He was also a member of the US National Academy of Sciences.

In 2016, Gossard was named as a recipient of a National Medal of Technology and Innovation. He died on June 26, 2022 at 87 years old.

== Lectures ==
- 1991 - Heterostructures for new dimensions of electron confinement Lecture sponsored by the Dept. of Electrical and Computer engineering, University of California, San Diego. Electrical and Computer Engineering Distinguished Lecture Series. Digital object made available by UC San Diego Library.
