= Phonon scattering =

Aspect of condensed matter physics

Phonons can scatter through several mechanisms as they travel through the material. These scattering mechanisms are: Umklapp phonon-phonon scattering, phonon-impurity scattering, phonon-electron scattering, and phonon-boundary scattering. Each scattering mechanism can be characterised by a relaxation rate 1/$\tau$ which is the inverse of the corresponding relaxation time.

All scattering processes can be taken into account using Matthiessen's rule. Then the combined relaxation time $\tau_{C}$ can be written as:

$$\frac{1}{\tau_C} = \frac{1}{\tau_U}+\frac{1}{\tau_M}+\frac{1}{\tau_B}+\frac{1}{\tau_\text{ph-e}}$$

The parameters $\tau_{U}$, $\tau_{M}$, $\tau_{B}$, $\tau_\text{ph-e}$ are due to Umklapp scattering, mass-difference impurity scattering, boundary scattering and phonon-electron scattering, respectively.

== Phonon-phonon scattering ==
For phonon-phonon scattering, effects by normal processes (processes which conserve the phonon wave vector - N processes) are ignored in favor of Umklapp processes (U processes). Since normal processes vary linearly with $\omega$ and umklapp processes vary with $\omega^2$, Umklapp scattering dominates at high frequency. $\tau_U$ is given by:

$$\frac{1}{\tau_U}=2\gamma^2\frac{k_B T}{\mu V_0}\frac{\omega^2}{\omega_D}$$

where $\gamma$ is the Gruneisen anharmonicity parameter, μ is the shear modulus, V_{0} is the volume per atom and $\omega_{D}$ is the Debye frequency.

== Three-phonon and four-phonon process ==
Thermal transport in non-metal solids was usually considered to be governed by the three-phonon scattering process, and the role of four-phonon and higher-order scattering processes was believed to be negligible. Recent studies have shown that the four-phonon scattering can be important for nearly all materials at high temperature and for certain materials at room temperature. The predicted significance of four-phonon scattering in boron arsenide was confirmed by experiments.

== Mass-difference impurity scattering ==
Mass-difference impurity scattering is given by:

$$\frac{1}{\tau_M}=\frac{V_0 \Gamma \omega^4}{4\pi v_g^3}$$

where $\Gamma$ is a measure of the impurity scattering strength. Note that ${v_g}$ is dependent of the dispersion curves.

== Boundary scattering ==
Boundary scattering is particularly important for low-dimensional nanostructures and its relaxation rate is given by:

$$\frac{1}{\tau_B}=\frac{v_g}{L_0}(1-p)$$

where $L_0$ is the characteristic length of the system and $p$ represents the fraction of specularly scattered phonons. The $p$ parameter is not easily calculated for an arbitrary surface. For a surface characterized by a root-mean-square roughness $\eta$, a wavelength-dependent value for $p$ can be calculated using

$$p(\lambda) = \exp\Bigg(-16\frac{\pi^2}{\lambda^2}\eta^2\cos^2\theta \Bigg)$$

where $\theta$ is the angle of incidence. An extra factor of $\pi$ is sometimes erroneously included in the exponent of the above equation. At normal incidence, $\theta=0$, perfectly specular scattering (i.e. $p(\lambda)=1$) would require an arbitrarily large wavelength, or conversely an arbitrarily small roughness. Purely specular scattering does not introduce a boundary-associated increase in the thermal resistance. In the diffusive limit, however, at $p=0$ the relaxation rate becomes

$$\frac{1}{\tau_B}=\frac{v_g}{L_0}$$

This equation is also known as Casimir limit.

These phenomenological equations can in many cases accurately model the thermal conductivity of isotropic nano-structures with characteristic sizes on the order of the phonon mean free path. More detailed calculations are in general required to fully capture the phonon-boundary interaction across all relevant vibrational modes in an arbitrary structure.

== Phonon-electron scattering ==
Phonon-electron scattering can also contribute when the material is heavily doped. The corresponding relaxation time is given as:

$$\frac{1}{\tau_\text{ph-e}}=\frac{n_e \epsilon^2 \omega}{\rho v_g^2 k_B T}\sqrt{\frac{\pi m^* v_g^2}{2k_B T}} \exp \left(-\frac{m^*v_g^2}{2k_B T}\right)$$

The parameter $n_{e}$ is conduction electrons concentration, ε is deformation potential, ρ is mass density and m* is effective electron mass. It is usually assumed that contribution to thermal conductivity by phonon-electron scattering is negligible.

== See also ==
- Lattice scattering
- Umklapp scattering
- Electron-longitudinal acoustic phonon interaction
