= DPA =

DPA may refer to:

== Organizations ==
- Dartmoor Preservation Association, a group which monitors development on Dartmoor in South West England
- Dental Professionals Association, a trade union supporting and representing primary dental care in the UK
- Deutsche Presse-Agentur (German News Agency), a news agency founded in 1949 in Germany
- Digital Pathology Association, a medical society for advancing the field of digital pathology
- DPA Microphones, a Danish manufacturer
- Drug Policy Alliance, an American anti-drug-war advocacy group
- Dubai Ports Authority, merged with Dubai Ports International in 2005 to form DP World

=== Government and politics ===
- California Department of Personnel Administration
- Defence Procurement Agency, an Executive Agency of the United Kingdom Ministry of Defence
- Defense Production Administration, a former independent agency of the United States government
- Definers Public Affairs, an American commercial research and PR firm
- Democratic Party of Albanians, an ethnic Albanian political party in the Republic of North Macedonia
- Democratic Progressive Alliance, an alliance of Indian political parties
- United Nations Department of Political Affairs, a department of the United Nations Secretariat
- Data protection authority, a role specified by EU General Data Protection Regulation (GDPR)
- Supreme Advisory Council (Dewan Pertimbangan Agung), a defunct Indonesian government body

== Law ==
- Durable power of attorney
- Defensive patent aggregation, the practice of purchasing patents or patent rights
- Deferred prosecution agreement, a voluntary alternative to adjudication in which a prosecutor agrees to grant amnesty in exchange for the defendant agreeing to fulfill certain requirements

=== Laws ===
- Defense Production Act of 1950, a United States law
- Defence Production Act (Canada)
- Data Protection Act 1998, a United Kingdom Act of Parliament to regulate the processing of information relating to individuals
  - Data Protection Act 2018, a United Kingdom Act of Parliament which updates the Data Protection Act 1998

== Computing ==
- Data presentation architecture, a skill-set that seeks to identify, locate, manipulate, format and present data
- Deterministic pushdown automaton
- Differential power analysis, a cryptographic attack

== Entertainment ==
- Pokémon Diamond and Pearl Adventure!, a manga series
- Drag Point Average, the grading system used on the television show RuPaul's Drag U

== Science and technology ==
- D-Phenylalanine, an enkephalinase inhibitor, antidepressant, and stereoisomer of the natural amino acid phenylalanine
- Decipascal (dPa), a SI unit equivalent to one tenth of a pascal
- Diagnostic peritoneal aspiration, a surgical investigation to assess abdominal bleeding
- Diphenylamine, a chemical stabiliser used in homogeneous propellants to absorb the catalyst produced by the autocatalytic decomposition of propellants
- 9,10-Diphenylanthracene, an organic compound
- Dipicolinic acid, a chemical compound found in bacterial spores
- Dipicolylamine, an organic compound used as a chelating ligand
- 2,2'-Dipyridylamide an organic ion ligand.
- Docosapentaenoic acid, a group of fatty acids
- Displacements per atom (dpa), in radiation material science, a measure of damage in nuclear materials
- 16-Dehydropregnenolone acetate (16-DPA), an intermediate in the production of many semisynthetic steroids

== Other uses ==
- Doctor of Public Administration, a terminal research degree in government
- DuPage Airport (IATA code), an airport in West Chicago, DuPage County, Illinois, US
- Data Processing Agreement, according to the General Data Protection Regulation (GDPR)
