= Francesca Iacopi =

Engineer, researcher and an academician

- Occupations: Engineer, researcher and academic

Academic background
- Education: M.Sc. Ph.D. M.A.
- Alma mater: La Sapienza University of Rome; Katholieke Universiteit Leuven

Francesca Iacopi is an Australian engineer, researcher and an academic. She specializes in materials and nanoelectronics engineering and is a professor at the University of Technology Sydney. She is a chief investigator of the ARC Centre of Excellence in Transformative Meta-Optical Systems, a Fellow of the Institution of Engineers Australia, and a senior member of the Institute of Electrical and Electronics Engineers.

Iacopi has authored over 130 publications and holds 9 granted patents. Her selected research areas include Nanoelectronics, Semiconductors, 2D Materials, Nanophotonics and Energy Storage. Her research has added to the ITRS roadmap of materials and processes for advanced semiconductor technologies regarding devices, interconnects, and packaging.

Iacopi's research contributions have earned her various awards including a Gold Award for Graduate Students (Materials Research Society) in 2003 and Global Innovation Award (TechConnect World) in 2014. She has served as an advisory committee member to the Queensland State Government on Science and Innovation in 2015. Iacopi was appointed representative for the IEEE Electron Devices Society to the International Roadmap for Devices and Systems (IRDS) in 2019. She founded and was the inaugural chair of IEEE Electron Device Society Chapter in New South Wales in 2019. She is an Elected Member of the IEEE Electron Devices Society Board of Governors.

== Education ==
Following her high school degree at the Liceo Scientifico Augusto Righi in Bologna, Iacopi went on to complete her master's degree in physics from La Sapienza University of Rome in 1996 and then moved to Belgium for her doctoral studies. She received her Ph.D. degree in materials and electrical engineering from the Katholieke Universiteit Leuven in 2004, under the supervision of Karen Maex. Later, she also completed a Master of Arts in cultural anthropology and development studies from the same university in 2009.

== Career ==
During her M.Sc. studies, Iacopi worked as a junior researcher at the Italian National Institute for Nuclear Physics from 1995 till 1998 and later moved to Belgium with a position at Vrije Universiteit Brussel in collaboration with CERN, Switzerland till 1999. In the following decade, Iacopi joined the Inter-university Microelectronics Center in Leuven, Belgium, as a research scientist and later got promoted to senior scientist from 2006. During her term in IMEC, Iacopi researched on interconnects and nanotechnology. Afterwards, she spent one year in Japan, where she was appointed Guest Associate Professor at the University of Tokyo, Kashiwa Campus, to study novel plasma processes. In 2010, she moved to USA and accepted an industrial position at Globalfoundries as a Manager of Customer Packaging Technology and directed the Chip-Package Interaction strategy for the company. Subsequently, Iacopi moved to Australia for a research position with Griffith University, where in 2012, she was awarded a Future Fellowship from the Australian Research Council. During this period, she founded her own research group and invented a catalytic process to obtain epitaxial graphene from silicon carbide on silicon. In 2015, she became a member of Advance Queensland Panel of Experts for the Queensland Government. During this time, she served as an advisor to the Queensland Government on the Science and Innovation for the State.

In 2016, Iacopi joined University of Technology Sydney and was appointed as full professor. She leads the Integrated Nanosystems Research Lab. In 2017, she served as head of discipline, communications and electronics for two years; in 2019, she founded and chaired the IEEE Electron Device Society Chapter in New South Wales, along with being appointed as associate investigator at the Australian Research Council Centre of Excellence for Future Low-Energy Electronics Technologies (FLEET). In 2020, she was appointed as chief investigator for the Australian Research Council Centre of Excellence for Transformative Meta-Optical Systems.

=== Research and work ===
Iacopi's notable research areas include Nanoelectronics, Semiconductors, 2D Materials, Nanophotonics and Energy Storage. Iacopi's earliest research focused on instrumentation for Medical Nuclear Imaging.

In late 1990s, she worked on the forward tracker portion of the Compact Muon Solenoid (CMS) detector. The underlying purpose of the research was the tracking of elementary particles through interaction of radiation with materials. In a report about the tests of CMS microstrip gas chamber (MSGC) modules at PSI, Iacopi and her colleagues conducted the CMS experiment and tested two CMS MSGC that were similar to the barrel of the tracker, using a high intensity beam. The inner layer of MSGC in CMS proved to be stable in terms of voltage, thus rendering the experiment successful. However, shortly after, a decision was made to change the technology for the CMS tracker to silicon detectors. In 1999, Iacopi started working at one of the largest independent R&D centers for semiconductors (IMEC) and focused on ultra-low-k/Highly porous dielectrics for on-chip interconnects. She is author of several seminal works in this area, which also led to technological implementation in the semiconductor industry. Iacopi authored an article about the problems with the structural stability of ultra-low-k-based interconnects and points that relaxation in ultra-low-k-based interconnect structures, either due to adhesion failure or by porous dielectrics compliance, can prove to be damaging in the interconnects. She proposed solutions to prevent the relaxation by either mechanism. She also defined the parameters required to generate well-grounded quantitative predictions. Her research at IMEC highlighted the issue of uncontrolled diffusion of species in the dielectric pores, and directed the slowing of the projection for the industrial uptake of ultra-low-k dielectrics by the International Technology Roadmap for Semiconductors (ITRS). Iacopi's research focus then shifted to semiconductor compatible growth and integration of semiconductor nanowires for electronic applications like Tunnel -Field Effect Transistors (T-FETs). Her main contribution has been the identification of indium as potential replacement for gold in the seeded nanowire growth by the vapour-liquid-solid (VLS) method. In an article published in 2008, Iacopi presented the size related characteristics of Indium-seeded silicon nanowires. She bases her research on the fact that the growth structure of nanowires change considerably when the size is in tens of nanometers. Iacopi suggested a model to counter this issue. In a similar article about the growth of silicon nanowires, Iacopi states that bottom-up manufacturing of nanowires for microelectronics is difficult as the characteristics of the wires would have to be controlled at the wafer -scale. She reviews the constraints for establishing a controlled process of a VLS growth of silicon nanowires and proposes suggestions for achieving the nanowire growth in a controlled manner.

In early 2010s, Iacopi worked on the demonstration that cold plasmas can be an effective solution to slow down the diffusion of reactive species into porous media. She wrote an article in 2011 about the cryogenic plasmas and nanoporous materials. Through her research, Iacopi demonstrated that by processing plasma at cryogenic temperatures, the diffusion of plasma into nanoporous materials can be considerably suppressed. She further demonstrates that this suppression is controlled by reaction factors, radical recombination and sticking coefficient. While working at Griffith University, Iacopi invented a direct and selective process for the wafer-scale synthesis of graphene on silicon, with applications in integrated micro technologies, including nanophotonics, bio-compatible sensing, and energy storage. Iacopi wrote an article about graphene growth with a nickel-copper alloy as catalyst. She obtained a few-layers graphene by a solid-source growth method with nickel-copper alloy as a mediator onto silicon carbide on silicon. It was found that this was the most suitable method of obtaining large-scale epitaxial graphene on silicon carbide on silicon. Iacopi describes the procedure for graphene synthesis in the article and also discusses the key characteristics of the process. In a similar article in 2014 about the graphitized silicon carbide microbeams, Iacopi explains the proven procedures and methods to obtain graphene on silicon wafers in a site-selective way, while also discussing the limitations. This research points to the replacing conductive metal films in MEMS and NEMS devices with the carbon-nickel alloy method. This invention earned her a Global Innovation Award from the TechConnect in 2014. Because of her research contributions, Iacopi and her research has been cited in various announcements and press-releases. In a follow-up to this research, she further proves the effectiveness of using the nickel-copper alloy for the production of large –scale epitaxial graphene on silicon with electrical conductivity comparable to graphene on silicon carbide wafers. Her current research at the University of Technology Sydney focuses on graphene and other two-dimensional materials on silicon for More-than-Moore applications, and to enable novel materials and functionalities for miniaturized systems encompassing electronics, photonics, sensing and energy.

== Awards and honors ==
- 2003 - Gold Graduate Student Award, Materials Research Society
- 2012 - Future Fellowship, Australian Research Council
- 2014 - Global Innovation Award, Tech Connect World
- 2015 - Member of advisory committee to the Queensland State Government on Science and Innovation
- 2018 - Listed in the 30 most innovative engineers, Institute of Engineers Australia
- 2024 - IEEE Fellow

== Selected articles ==
- K.Maex, M.R.Baklanov, D.Shamiryan, F.Iacopi, S.Brongersma, Z.S.Yanovitskaya, Low dielectric constant materials for microelectronics, Applied Physics Focused Review, J.Appl.Phys.93 (11), pp. 8793–8841, 2003.
- D.Shamiryan, T.J.Abell, F.Iacopi, K.Maex, Low-k dielectric materials, Materials Today, January 2004, pp. 34–39.
- R.Hoofman, G.Verheijden, J.Michelon, F.Iacopi, Y.Travaly, M.Baklanov, Zs.Tőkei, G.Beyer, "Challenges in the implementation of low-k dielectrics in the back-end of line", Microelectron.Eng. 80, pp. 337–344, 2005.
- N.Mishra, J.Boeckl, N.Motta and F.Iacopi, "Graphene growth on silicon carbide: a review", Phys. Status Solidi A 213, No. 9, 2277–2289 (also invited Issue Cover), 2016.
- F Iacopi, Y Travaly, B Eyckens, C Waldfried, T Abell, EP Guyer, DM Gage, RH Dauskardt, T Sajavaara, K Houthoofd, P Grobet, P Jacobs, K Maex, Short-ranged structural rearrangement and enhancement of mechanical properties of organosilicate glasses induced by ultraviolet radiation, Journal of Applied Physics 99 (5), 053511
- R.Pani, R.Pellegrini, F.Scopinaro, A.Soluri, G.De Vincentis, F.Iacopi, A.Corona, A.Grammatico, S.Filippi, P.L.Ballesio, Scintillating array gamma camera for clinical use, Nucl.Instr. and Meth., vol.A392, n.1-3 (1997), 295-298.
- F Iacopi, PM Vereecken, M Schaekers, M Caymax, Nele Moelans, Bart Blanpain, O Richard, Christophe Detavernier, H Griffiths, Plasma-enhanced chemical vapour deposition growth of Si nanowires with low melting point metal catalysts: an effective alternative to Au-mediated growth, Nanotechnology 18 (50), 505307
- F.Iacopi, J.H.Choi, K.Terashima, P.M.Rice, G.Dubois, "Cryogenic plasmas for controlled processing of nanoporous materials", Phys. Chem. Chem. Phys., 13, 3634-3637, 2011.
- M Amjadipour, D Su, F Iacopi, Graphitic‐Based Solid‐State Supercapacitors: Enabling Redox Reaction by In Situ Electrochemical Treatment, Batteries & Supercaps 3 (7), 587-595 (Also invited Front Cover)
- F.Zarotti, B.Gupta, F.Iacopi, A.Sgarlata, M.Tomellini, N.Motta, "Time evolution of graphene growth on SiC as a function of annealing temperature", Carbon 98, 307-312, 2016.
