= Gallium nitride nanotube =

Nanotubes of gallium nitride

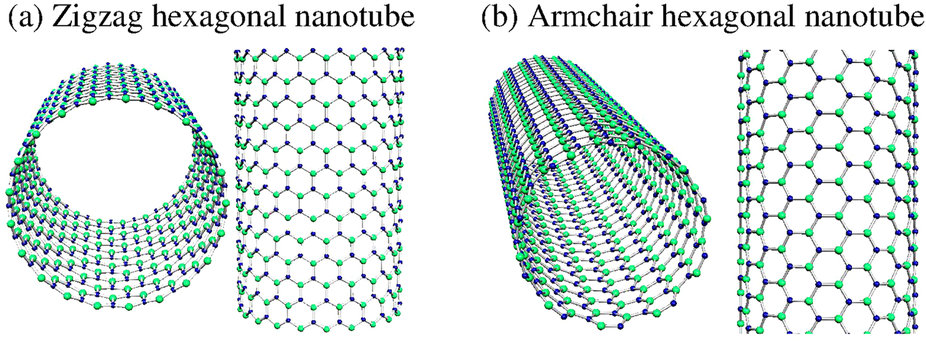
Zigzag and armchair GaN nanotubes

Gallium nitride nanotubes (GaNNTs) are nanotubes of gallium nitride. They can be grown by chemical vapour deposition (diameters of 30–250 nm).

== History ==
Single crystal gallium nitride nanotubes were first reported to be synthesized by Peidong Yang and his research team at the University of Berkeley's Department of Chemistry on April 10, 2003. The synthesis was achieved by initially creating nanowires from pure crystals of zinc oxide onto a sapphire wafer through a process Yang and his colleagues previously created called epitaxial casting. These zinc oxide nanowires were then used as templates over which crystals of gallium nitride were grown by chemical vapour deposition. Once the gallium nitride crystals formed, heat was then applied to the sapphire wafer to allow vaporization of the zinc oxide nanowire cores. This left behind hollow gallium nitride nanotubes, since gallium nitride is a much more thermally stable material compared to zinc oxide. The resulting gallium nitride nanotubes were uniform in lengths of 2-5 μm and 30-200 nm in diameter.

== Structure and Properties of Gallium Nitride Nanotubes ==
=== General Shape and Size ===
GaNNTs are a form of one dimensional material analogous to the much more popularly known Carbon nanotubes. Experimental and theoretical analysis of GaNNTs have shown that these nanotubes can be constructed with a diameter of 30-250 nm and a wall thickness of 5-100 nm. The GaNNTs also differ by how the tubes are "rolled." The rolls are categorized by how the molecular structure bends and use a (n, m) format to determine how the tube was bent into shape. The two most common formations are zig-zag, which has a (n, 0) bend, and armchair, which has a (n, n) bend. Both the size of the nanotubes and the rolling of the nanotube play a part in the properties of any given GaNNT.

The structural properties of a GaNNT begin with the lattice constant, c, of the unit cell of a GaNNT. The lattice constant is dependent on the bond length of the atoms. For a zig-zag shape, c = 3 - (bond length), while for the armchair shape, c = √3 - (bond length). A theoretical evaluation has determined that the optimum bond lengths are 1.92 angstroms and 1.88 angstroms for zig-zag and armchair nanotubes respectively. This tube geometry remains stable through a very wide temperature range, from just above 0K to 800K.

=== Band Structure ===
The band gap of GaNNTs depends on both the rolling and size of a particular nanotube. It was found that a zig-zag GaNNT would have a direct band gap, while an armchair GaNNT would have an indirect band gap. Additionally, the band gap increases with increasing radius. However, while for a zigzag GaNNT the band gap would increase significantly, an armchair GaNNT would have its band gap increase only slightly. A nitrogen vacancy in the structure, which while energetically unfavorable is more likely than a gallium vacancy, results in a band that is dependent on the spin states of the electrons. The band for spin down electrons creates an unfilled band above the Fermi level and increases the band gap, while the band for spin up electrons creates a filled band under the Fermi level and decreases the band gap. This spin-dependent band splitting makes GaNNTs a potential candidate for spintronic computing systems.

=== Mechanical ===
Mechanical properties of GaNNTs are influenced by the rolling of the nanotubes, though it is unclear if the size of the nanotubes plays a part as well. The Young's modulus was computed to be 793 GPa for a (5,5) armchair nanotube, while that for a (9,0) zig-zag nanotube was calculated to be 721 GPa. For the (5,5) armchair and (9,0) nanotubes, other calculated values include the maximum tensile strength was 4.25 and 3.43 eV/Angstrom, the critical strain was 14.6% and 13.3%, and the Poisson ratio was 0.263 and 0.221 respectively. It is assumed that the properties for any (n, m) nanotube in between would have a property somewhere in those ranges.

The mechanical properties are also influenced by the temperature of the material and the strain rate the nanotube is put under. For temperature, the tensile strength of a GaNNT decreases at higher temperature. At higher temperatures, more molecules possess sufficient energy to overcome the activation energy barrier which results in deformation at lower strains. The strain rate of the material causes there to be a reduced tensile strength when the strain rate is lower. This is due to the material not being under constant strain throughout, resulting in some locations in the material having higher stresses than other locations. The slower strain rate allows the GaNNT more time to induce adequate local deformations, and therefore plastic deformation occurs earlier. This means that a slower strain rate results in a lower tensile strength.

== Synthesis ==
=== Hexagonal Gallium Nitride Nanotubes (h-GaN) ===
Gallium nitride (GaN) nanotubes are primarily formed in one of two ways: using a template directed method or vapor- solid (VS) growth.

==== Template Directed Method ====
The template method uses a hexagonal zinc oxide (ZnO) nanowire as the templates. Using chemical vapor deposition, thin layers of GaN are deposited onto the templates, creating a casting from epitaxial growth. The ZnO nanowire templates are then removed by thermal reduction and evaporation. An analysis using transmission electron microscopy (TEM) shows that ZnO residue, along with a thin film of porous GaN, is still found in the upper portion of the nanotubes after the templates are removed. This is a result of zinc and oxygen coming off of the template through the porous layer of GaN in the initial stages of forming the nanotube. This method produced h-GaN nanotubes that primarily had one open and one closed end, although tubes with both ends open were also found. Using energy-dispersive x-ray spectroscopy (EDS), it was observed that the nanotubes have a 1:1 ratio of intensity in gallium and nitrogen. The nanotubes had walls between 5- 50 nm thick, and inner diameters with lengths between 30- 200 nm.

==== Vapor-Solid Growth ====
GaN nanotubes can be made without a template. Another way to make h-GaN nanotubes is through a two- stage process that converts Gallium(III) oxide (Ga_{2}O_{3}) nanotubes to h- GaN nanotubes. This method produces less variation in the size and shape of the nanotubes produced. The nanotubes produced have a length of about 10 nm and a uniform outer diameter of around 80 nm and wall thickness of around 20 nm. This method yields 4- 5.0% products, which is based on how much Ga_{2}O_{3} is present.

=== Cubic Gallium Nitride Nanotubes (c-GaN) ===
Using Ga_{2}O_{3} powders and ammonia (NH_{3}), c-GaN nanotubes can also be synthesized without the use of a template in a vapor- solid process. Instead, a catalyst- free high temperature process is used, which requires certain conditions. One of these conditions was high heat. The nanotube growth for c-GaN nanotubes was done at around 1600 degrees Celsius (200 degrees higher than the conditions required to grow h- GaN nanotubes), and was continuously increased throughout the process. Another condition required that the flow rates of NH_{3} and N_{2} be increased during the two- step chemical reaction required to make the nanotubes.

The first step required carbon from a graphite crucible, which reacted with Ga_{2}O_{3} to produce Ga_{2}O vapor. The vapor then reacts with NH_{3} to produce solid GaN nanoparticles that are picked up in the NH_{3} and N_{2} flow. The nanoparticles are then transported to a lower temperature induction furnace where they will collect in groups on a carbon fiber and self- assemble rectangular nanotubes through vapor- solid growth. Most of the formed nanotubes have a square or rectangular cross section with lengths between 50- 150 nm. The tubes were found to have a wall thickness between 20- 50 nm and longer lengths of several micrometers.

Before this method was applied, nanocrystallites of c-GaN were the only nanostructures able to be synthesized in the cubic structure of GaN.

== Recent Progress ==
=== Large Scale Fabrication ===
M. Jansen et al. has developed a low-cost, fast, and large scale fabrication process for the generation of gallium nitride nanotubes. This was achieved by using a combination of lithography and inductively coupled plasma top-down etching to produce a hard etch mask of a silicon nano ring array. The nano ring array was then placed onto the surface of bulk gallium nitride and etched away to produce nanotube structures of equal proportions.

=== Microchip Integration ===
Chu-Ho Lee and his research group at the Seoul National University in Korea were able to synthesize indium doped gallium nitride nanotubes that were fabricated onto silicon substrates. The group used these nanotubes as light emitting diodes, which primarily emitted light in the green visible spectrum. Since the synthesis of these nanotubes relies on controllable geometric parameters, gallium nitride nanotubes could potentially allow for ways to produce microchips with faster processing speeds through the use of interchip and intrachip optical communication.

=== Tube Shape and Emitted Light Shape ===
Changyi Li and his research team at the University of New Mexico recently showed that by changing the geometry of the openings on gallium nitride nanotubes, the shape of emitted light changes when acting as light-emitting diodes. The group used electron beam lithography to create well-defined annular shaped hollow regions within the gallium nitride nanotubes, which ultimately led to annular shaped emitted light.
