= Zhihong Chen =

Chinese-American nanoelectronics engineer

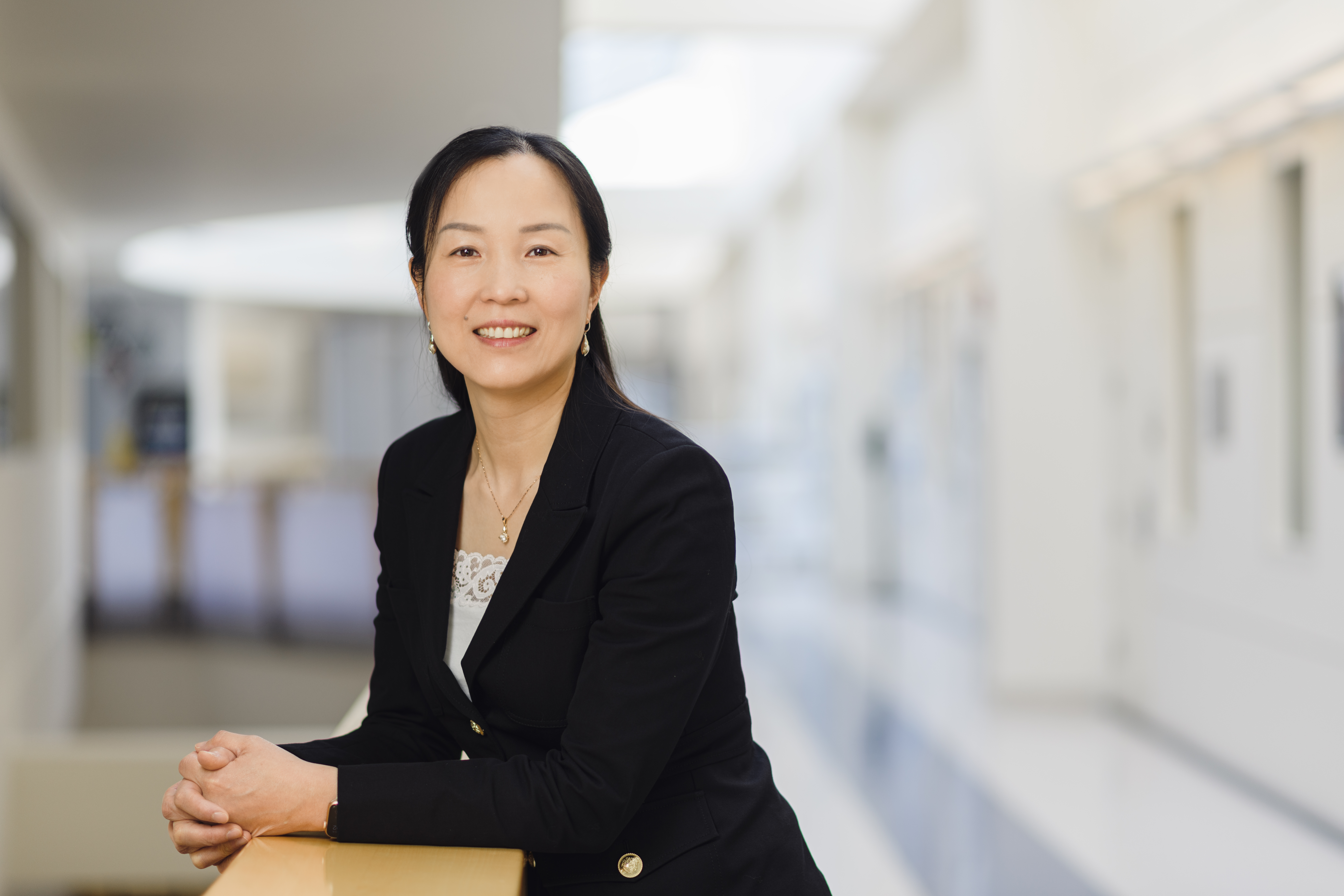
Entrance of the Scifres Nanofabrication Laboratory in Birck Nanotechnology Center, Purdue University

Zhihong Chen is a Chinese-American nanoelectronics engineer known for her research on the electronic properties of carbon nanotubes and graphene. She is a professor of electrical and computer engineering at Purdue University.

== Education and career ==
Chen graduated from Fudan University in 1998 with a bachelor's degree in physics. She went to the University of Florida for graduate study in physics, earning a master's degree in 2002 and completing her Ph.D. in 2003.

After postdoctoral research for IBM Research at the Thomas J. Watson Research Center, she became a permanent research staff member at the center in 2006. She moved to Purdue University as an associate professor in 2010, and was promoted to full professor in 2017.

== Recognition ==
In 2022, Chen was named an IEEE Fellow "for contributions to the understanding and applications of low-dimensional nanomaterials".
