= Silicon nanotube =

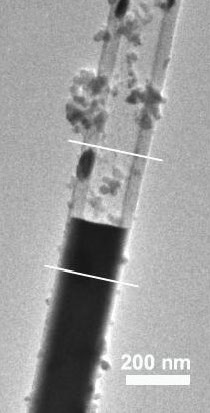
Si nanotube (top) created by partial etching of Si-covered ZnO nanowire (bottom).

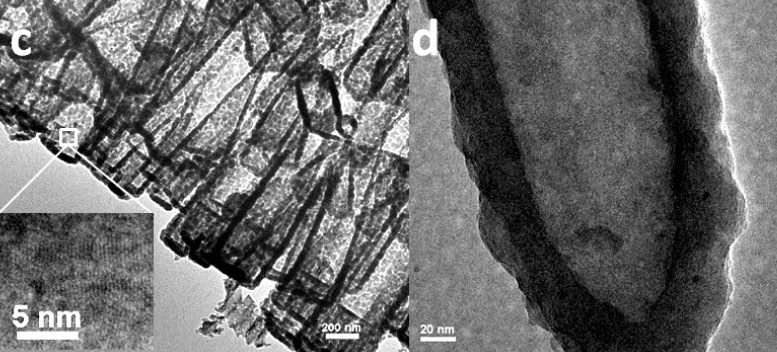
Si nanotubes created by etching of Si-covered ZnO nanowires.

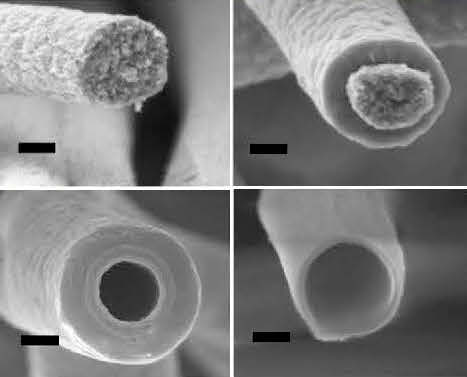
Si nanotubes produced using a carbon template. Clockwise: carbon fiber; carbon fiber coated with silicon; silicon oxide tube remaining after removing the carbon core; covering the silicon oxide with poly-crystalline silicon. Scale bars 200 nm

Silicon nanotubes are nanoparticles which create a tube-like structure from silicon atoms. As with silicon nanowires, they are technologically important due to their unusual physical properties, which differ fundamentally to those of bulk silicon. The first reports on silicon nanotubes appeared around the year 2000.

== Synthesis ==
One method to prepare silicon nanotubes is using a reactor employing an electric arc without the use of any catalyst. To ensure purity, the reactor is evacuated and filled with the nonreactive noble gas argon. The actual formation of the nanotubes relies on the process of chemical vapor deposition.

A more common laboratory-scale method involves the use of germanium, carbon or zinc oxide nanowires as a template. Silicon, coming typically from either silane or silicon tetrachloride gas, is then deposited onto the nanowires, and the core is dissolved leaving behind a silicon tube. The growth of template nanowires, silicon deposition and nanowire etching, and consequently the geometry of resulting Si nanotubes, can be accurately controlled in the second method; however, the smallest inner diameter is limited by tens of nanometers.

The conventional vapor-liquid-solid (VLS) and solid-liquid-solid (SLS) mechanisms are favorite techniques to grow one-dimensional silicon nanostructures. However, they usually incorporate only one type of metal as catalyst and therefore can not be used for growing tubular (hollow) silicon nanostructures. In a recent attempt, a nickel-gold bilayer catalyst layer has been used to take the advantage of the uneven growth rate of constituent metal catalysts. Using these modified VLS and SLS techniques, multiwall silicon nanotubes with a sidewall thickness of few nanometers have been grown.

== Applications ==
As a result of their ballistic conductivity, silicon nanotubes and nanowires have been considered for use in electronics, e.g. in thermoelectric generators. Since the structure can accommodate molecules of hydrogen so it might resemble coal without the CO_{2}, it appears that silicon nanomaterials may behave like a metal fuel. A silicon nanotube charged with hydrogen delivers energy and in the process leaves residual water, ethanol, silicon and sand. However, as hydrogen production requires considerable energy, this is only a proposed method of storing energy, not producing it.

Silicon nanotubes and silicon nanowires can be used in lithium-ion batteries. Conventional Li-ion batteries use graphitic carbon as the anode, but replacing this with silicon nanotubes experimentally increases the specific (by mass) anode capacity by a factor of 10 (though the overall capacity improvement is lower due to the far lower specific cathode capacities).

Another emerging application of silicon nanotube is light emission. Since silicon is an indirect band gap semiconductor, the quantum yield of radiative recombination in this material is very low. As the thickness of silicon-based nanostructures reduces below the effective Bohr radius (about 9 nm, in silicon) the quantum efficiency of light emission from this material increases owing to the quantum confinement effect. Relying on this fact, photoemission capability of silicon nanotubes with very thin sidewalls has been demonstrated.
