= Nanoelectronics =

Use of nanotechnology in electronic components

Nanoelectronics refers to the use of nanotechnology in electronic components. The term covers a diverse set of devices and materials, with the common characteristic that they are so small that inter-atomic interactions and quantum mechanical properties need to be studied extensively. Some of these candidates include: hybrid molecular/semiconductor electronics, one-dimensional nanotubes/nanowires (e.g. carbon nanotube or silicon nanowires) or advanced molecular electronics.

Nanoelectronic devices have critical dimensions with a size range between 1 nm and 100 nm. Recent silicon MOSFET (metal–oxide–semiconductor field-effect transistor, or MOS transistor) technology generations are already within this regime, including 22 nanometers CMOS (complementary MOS) nodes and succeeding 14 nm, 10 nm and 7 nm FinFET (fin field-effect transistor) generations. Nanoelectronics is sometimes considered as disruptive technology because present candidates are significantly different from traditional transistors.

== Fundamental concepts ==
In 1965, Gordon Moore observed that silicon transistors were undergoing a continual process of scaling downward, an observation which was later codified as Moore's law. Since his observation, transistor minimum feature sizes have decreased from 10 micrometers to the 10 nm range as of 2019. Note that the technology node doesn't directly represent the minimum feature size. The field of nanoelectronics aims to enable the continued realization of this law by using new methods and materials to build electronic devices with feature sizes on the nanoscale.

=== Mechanical issues ===
The volume of an object decreases as the third power of its linear dimensions, but the surface area only decreases as its second power. This somewhat subtle and unavoidable principle has significant ramifications. For example, the power of a drill (or any other machine) is proportional to the volume, while the friction of the drill's bearings and gears is proportional to their surface area. For a normal-sized drill, the power of the device is enough to handily overcome any friction. However, scaling its length down by a factor of 1000, for example, decreases its power by 1000^{3} (a factor of a billion) while reducing the friction by only 1000^{2} (a factor of only a million). Proportionally it has 1000 times less power per unit friction than the original drill. If the original friction-to-power ratio was, say, 1%, that implies the smaller drill will have 10 times as much friction as power; the drill is useless.

For this reason, while super-miniature electronic integrated circuits are fully functional, the same technology cannot be used to make working mechanical devices beyond the scales where frictional forces start to exceed the available power. So even though you may see microphotographs of delicately etched silicon gears, such devices are currently little more than curiosities with limited real world applications, for example, in moving mirrors and shutters. Surface tension increases in much the same way, thus magnifying the tendency for very small objects to stick together. This could possibly make any kind of "micro factory" impractical: even if robotic arms and hands could be scaled down, anything they pick up will tend to be impossible to put down. The above being said, molecular evolution has resulted in working cilia, flagella, muscle fibers and rotary motors in aqueous environments, all on the nanoscale. These machines exploit the increased frictional forces found at the micro or nanoscale. Unlike a paddle or a propeller which depends on normal frictional forces (the frictional forces perpendicular to the surface) to achieve propulsion, cilia develop motion from the exaggerated drag or laminar forces (frictional forces parallel to the surface) present at micro and nano dimensions. To build meaningful "machines" at the nanoscale, the relevant forces need to be considered. We are faced with the development and design of intrinsically pertinent machines rather than the simple reproductions of macroscopic ones.

All scaling issues therefore need to be assessed thoroughly when evaluating nanotechnology for practical applications.

== Approaches ==
=== Nanofabrication ===
For example, electron transistors, which involve transistor operation based on a single electron. Nanoelectromechanical systems also fall under this category. Nanofabrication can be used to construct ultradense parallel arrays of nanowires, as an alternative to synthesizing nanowires individually. Of particular prominence in this field, silicon nanowires are being increasingly studied towards diverse applications in nanoelectronics, energy conversion and storage. Such SiNWs can be fabricated by thermal oxidation in large quantities to yield nanowires with controllable thickness.

=== Nanomaterials electronics ===
Besides being small and allowing more transistors to be packed into a single chip, the uniform and symmetrical structure of nanowires and/or nanotubes allows a higher electron mobility (faster electron movement in the material), a higher dielectric constant (faster frequency), and a symmetrical electron/hole characteristic.

Also, nanoparticles can be used as quantum dots.

=== Molecular electronics ===
Single-molecule electronic devices are extensively researched. These schemes would make heavy use of molecular self-assembly, designing the device components to construct a larger structure or even a complete system on their own. This can be very useful for reconfigurable computing, and may even completely replace present FPGA technology.

Molecular electronics is a technology under development brings hope for future atomic-scale electronic systems. A promising application of molecular electronics was proposed by the IBM researcher Ari Aviram and the theoretical chemist Mark Ratner in their 1974 and 1988 papers Molecules for Memory, Logic and Amplification (see unimolecular rectifier).

Many nanowire structures have been studied as candidates for interconnecting nanoelectronic devices: nanotubes of carbon and other materials, metal atom chaines, cumulene or polyyne carbon atom chains, and many polymers such as polythiophenes.

=== Other approaches ===
Nanoionics studies the transport of ions rather than electrons in nanoscale systems.

Nanophotonics studies the behavior of light on the nanoscale, and has the goal of developing devices that take advantage of this behavior.

== Nanoelectronic devices ==
Current high-technology production processes are based on traditional top down strategies, where nanotechnology has already been introduced silently. The critical length scale of integrated circuits is already at the nanoscale (50 nm and below) regarding the gate length of transistors in CPUs or DRAM devices.

=== Computers ===
Simulation result for formation of inversion channel (electron density) and attainment of threshold voltage (IV) in a nanowire MOSFET. Note that the threshold voltage for this device lies around 0.45 V.

Nanoelectronics holds the promise of making computer processors more powerful than are possible with conventional semiconductor fabrication techniques. A number of approaches are currently being researched, including new forms of nanolithography, as well as the use of nanomaterials such as nanowires or small molecules in place of traditional CMOS components. Field-effect transistors have been made using both semiconducting carbon nanotubes and with heterostructured semiconductor nanowires (SiNWs).

=== Memory storage ===
Electronic memory designs in the past have largely relied on the formation of transistors. However, research into crossbar switch based electronics have offered an alternative using reconfigurable interconnections between vertical and horizontal wiring arrays to create ultra high density memories. Two leaders in this area are Nantero which has developed a carbon nanotube based crossbar memory called Nano-RAM and Hewlett-Packard which has proposed the use of memristor material as a future replacement of Flash memory.

An example of such novel devices is based on spintronics. The dependence of the resistance of a material (due to the spin of the electrons) on an external field is called magnetoresistance. This effect can be significantly amplified (GMR - Giant Magneto-Resistance) for nanosized objects, for example when two ferromagnetic layers are separated by a nonmagnetic layer, which is several nanometers thick (e.g. Co-Cu-Co). The GMR effect has led to a strong increase in the data storage density of hard disks and made the gigabyte range possible. The so-called tunneling magnetoresistance (TMR) is very similar to GMR and based on the spin dependent tunneling of electrons through adjacent ferromagnetic layers. Both GMR and TMR effects can be used to create a non-volatile main memory for computers, such as the so-called magnetic random access memory or MRAM.

=== Novel optoelectronic devices ===
In the modern communication technology traditional analog electrical devices are increasingly replaced by optical or optoelectronic devices due to their enormous bandwidth and capacity, respectively. Two promising examples are photonic crystals and quantum dots. Photonic crystals are materials with a periodic variation in the refractive index with a lattice constant that is half the wavelength of the light used. They offer a selectable band gap for the propagation of a certain wavelength, thus they resemble a semiconductor, but for light or photons instead of electrons. Quantum dots are nanoscaled objects, which can be used, among many other things, for the construction of lasers. The advantage of a quantum dot laser over the traditional semiconductor laser is that their emitted wavelength depends on the diameter of the dot. Quantum dot lasers are cheaper and offer a higher beam quality than conventional laser diodes.

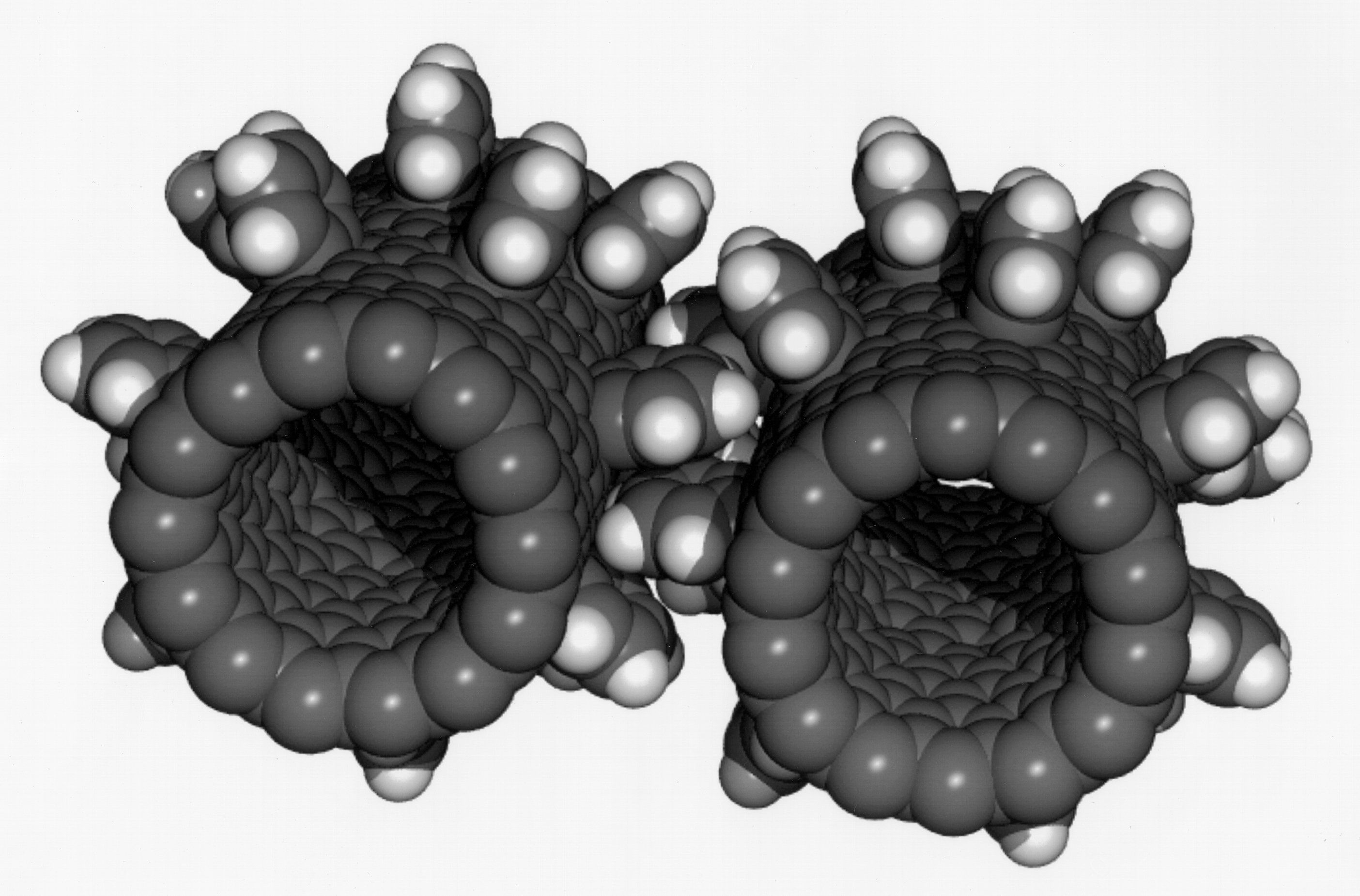

=== Displays ===
The production of displays with low energy consumption might be accomplished using carbon nanotubes (CNT) and/or silicon nanowires. Such nanostructures are electrically conductive and due to their small diameter of several nanometers, they can be used as field emitters with extremely high efficiency for field-emission displays (FED). The principle of operation resembles that of the cathode-ray tube, but on a much smaller length scale.

=== Quantum computers ===
Entirely new approaches for computing exploit the laws of quantum mechanics for novel quantum computers, which enable the use of fast quantum algorithms. The Quantum computer has quantum bit memory space termed "Qubit" for several computations at the same time. In nanoelectronic devices, the qubit is encoded by the quantum state of one or more electrons spin. The spin are confined by either a semiconductor quantum dot or a dopant.

=== Radios ===
Nanoradios have been developed structured around carbon nanotubes.

=== Energy production ===
Research is ongoing to use nanowires and other nanostructured materials with the hope to create cheaper and more efficient solar cells than are possible with conventional planar silicon solar cells. It is believed that the invention of more efficient solar energy would have a great effect on satisfying global energy needs.

There is also research into energy production for devices that would operate in vivo, called bio-nano generators. A bio-nano generator is a nanoscale electrochemical device, like a fuel cell or galvanic cell, but drawing power from blood glucose in a living body, much the same as how the body generates energy from food. To achieve the effect, an enzyme is used that is capable of stripping glucose of its electrons, freeing them for use in electrical devices. The average person's body could, theoretically, generate 100 watts of electricity (about 2000 food calories per day) using a bio-nano generator. However, this estimate is only true if all food was converted to electricity, and the human body needs some energy consistently, so possible power generated is likely much lower. The electricity generated by such a device could power devices embedded in the body (such as pacemakers), or sugar-fed nanorobots. Much of the research done on bio-nano generators is still experimental, with Panasonic's Nanotechnology Research Laboratory among those at the forefront.

=== Medical diagnostics ===
There is great interest in constructing nanoelectronic devices that could detect the concentrations of biomolecules in real time for use as medical diagnostics, thus falling into the category of nanomedicine. A parallel line of research seeks to create nanoelectronic devices which could interact with single cells for use in basic biological research. These devices are called nanosensors. Such miniaturization on nanoelectronics towards in vivo proteomic sensing should enable new approaches for health monitoring, surveillance, and defense technology.
