= Nanotube =

Rotating single-walled zigzag carbon nanotube

A nanotube is a nanoscale cylindrical structure with a hollow core, typically composed of carbon atoms, though other materials can also form nanotubes. Carbon nanotubes (CNTs) are the most well-known and widely studied type, consisting of rolled-up sheets of graphene with diameters ranging from about 1 to tens of nanometers and lengths up to millimeters. These structures exhibit remarkable physical, chemical, and electrical properties, including high tensile strength, excellent thermal and electrical conductivity, and unique quantum effects due to their one-dimensional nature. Nanotubes can be classified into two main categories: single-walled nanotubes (SWNTs) and multi-walled nanotubes (MWNTs), each with distinct characteristics and potential applications. Since their discovery in 1991, nanotubes have been the subject of intense research and development, with promising applications in fields such as electronics, materials science, energy storage, and medicine.

== Types ==
- BCN nanotube, composed of comparable amounts of boron, carbon, and nitrogen atoms
- Boron nitride nanotube, a polymorph of boron nitride
- Carbon nanotube, includes general nanotube terminology and diagrams
- DNA nanotube, a two-dimensional lattice which curves back upon itself, somewhat similar in size and shape to a carbon nanotube
- Gallium nitride nanotube, a nanotube of gallium nitride
- Silicon nanotube, made of silicon atoms
- Non-carbon nanotube, especially tungsten(IV) sulfide nanotubes
- Tunneling nanotube, a tubular membrane connection between cells
- Titanium nanotubes, created by the conversion of the mineral anatase by hydrothermal synthesis

== Nanotubes builders ==
- Chiraltube. Atomistic builder for any nanotubes with any chirality from any 2D material.
- TubeASP. For carbon nanotubes.
- Nanotuve Modeler. For carbon nanotubes only.
