= Emac (disambiguation) =

Emac, Emacs or similar may refer to:

- eMac, a now-discontinued Macintosh desktop computer made by Apple Inc.
- Emergency Management Assistance Compact, a mutual aid agreement between states and territories of the United States, enabling resource sharing during natural and man-made disasters
- Extended metal atom chains (EMACs), molecules that consist of a linear string of directly bonded metal atoms, surrounded by organic ligands
- Emacs, a family of text editors
- EMAC, Ethernet media access control
- EMAC, Eastern Maar Aboriginal Corporation, land council for the Eastern Maar people in Victoria, Australia

== See also ==
- Emax (disambiguation)
