= BCN nanotube =

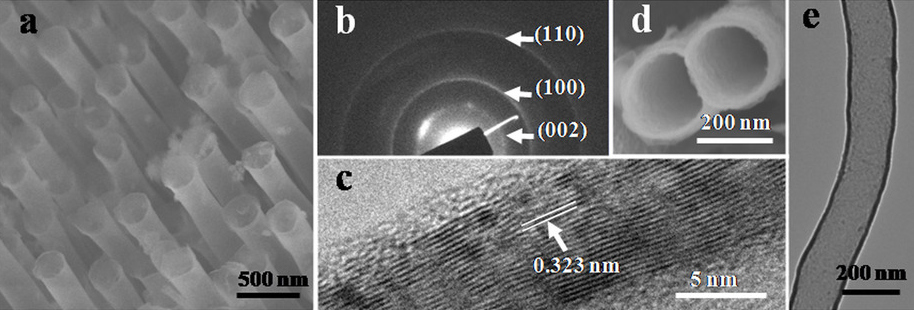
(a,d,e) Electron micrographs of BC_{2}N nanotubes, (b) Electron diffraction pattern, (c) fragment of the nanotube wall.

BCN nanotubes are tubular structures with a sub-micrometer diameter and a length much longer than diameter. They are composed of comparable amounts of boron, carbon and nitrogen atoms.

First made in 1994, synthesis methods have included: arc-discharge, laser ablation, chemical vapor deposition (CVD), template route, and pyrolysis techniques. Single-walled B–C–N nanotubes have been made with a hot-filament method.

== Solvothermal synthesis ==
Vertically aligned arrays of ~BC_{2}N nanotubes can be produced by solvothermal synthesis in a stainless steel autoclave from a mixture of sodium azide (NaN_{3}), ammonium fluoroborate (NH_{4}BF_{4}) and methyl cyanide (CH_{3}CN). The mixture, together with the solvent and other additives is heated to 400 °C for ~14 h. The final composition was approx B_{19}C_{55}N_{26}.

=== Potential applications ===
The vertically aligned BCN nanotubes (made as above) exhibit a high and stable specific capacitance (>500 F/g), which exceeds that of alternative carbon nanomaterials, and therefore have potential applications in supercapacitors.

== Facile synthesis ==
Another method produced nanotubes of composition : B_{45%},C_{31%},N_{24%} The method was grow them on stainless steel by reacting boron, zinc oxide (ZnO), and ethanol in nitrogen and hydrogen at 1150 °C. The resulting nanotubes had an average diameter of about 90 nm.
