= Emax =

Emax, E-max or similar may refer to:

- E-mu Emax, a line of sound samplers
- E-Max School of Engineering and Applied Research, an engineering college in Haryana, India
- E-Max shopping mall, within the Kowloonbay International Trade & Exhibition Centre
- Maximal efficacy, or intrinsic activity
- IPS E.max, a type of lithium disilicate glass-ceramic used in dental restorations such as dental bridges and crowns
- "Emax I", "Emax II", and "Emax III", songs by Destroyer from the 1998 album City of Daughters

== See also ==
- Emac (disambiguation)
- Emacs, a family of text editors
