= Digital Pathology Association =

- Abbreviation: DPA
- Type: NGO
- Legal status: Nonprofit
- Purpose: Education, Advocacy
- Headquarters: Carmel, Indiana
- Website: digitalpathologyassociation.org

The Digital Pathology Association (DPA), is a non-profit organization of professionals in the field of pathology and related technologies. It has over 2,000 members and is headquartered in Carmel, Indiana.

== Overview ==
Founded in 2009, the DPA's primary achievement has been to work with the FDA to develop a framework for clearance to market whole slide imaging systems. The DPA provides educational resources at its web site as well as hosting an annual scientific and educational conference, Pathology Visions.

== See also ==
- Pathology
- Anatomic pathology
- Digital pathology
