= 2,2'-Dipyridylamine =

2,2′-Dipyridylamine
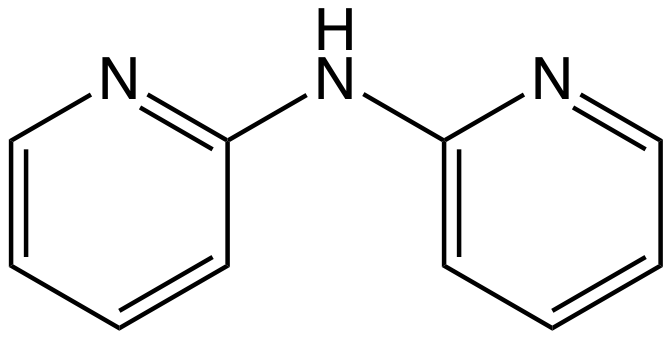

Names
- Preferred IUPAC name N-(Pyridin-2-yl)pyridin-2-amine
- Other names 2,2′-Iminodipyridine

Identifiers
CAS Number	1202-34-2
3D model (JSmol)	Interactive image
ChEMBL	ChEMBL1735909
ChemSpider	13888
ECHA InfoCard	100.013.513
EC Number	214-864-3
PubChem CID	14547
UNII	X9BF664YAK
CompTox Dashboard (EPA)	DTXSID5061619
- InChI: InChI=1S/C10H9N3/c1-3-7-11-9(5-1)13-10-6-2-4-8-12-10/h1-8H,(H,11,12,13) Key: HMMPCBAWTWYFLR-UHFFFAOYSA-N
- SMILES: C1=CC=NC(=C1)NC2=CC=CC=N2

Properties
Chemical formula	C_{10}H_{9}N_{3}
Molar mass	171.203 g·mol^{−1}
Appearance	white solid
Melting point	90.5 °C (194.9 °F; 363.6 K)
Boiling point	307.5 °C (585.5 °F; 580.6 K)

Hazards
- GHS labelling
Pictograms	(GHS07: Exclamation mark)
Signal word	Warning
Hazard statements	H315, H319, H335
Precautionary statements	P261, P264, P271, P280, P302+P352, P304+P340, P305+P351+P338, P312, P321, P332+P313, P337+P313, P362, P403+P233, P405, P501
- Except where otherwise noted, data are given for materials in their standard state (at 25 °C [77 °F], 100 kPa). Infobox references

2,2′-Dipyridylamine is an organic compound with the formula (C_{5}H_{4}N)_{2}NH. It consists of a pair of 2-pyridyl groups (C_{5}H_{4}N) linked to a secondary amine. The compound forms a range of coordination complexes. Its conjugate base, 2,2′-dipyridylamide, forms extended metal atom chains.

== Formation ==
2,2′-Dipyridylamine can be formed by heating pyridine with sodium amide. Alternatively, 2-aminopyridine can be heated with 2-chloropyridine over barium oxide.
