= Silicon nanowire =

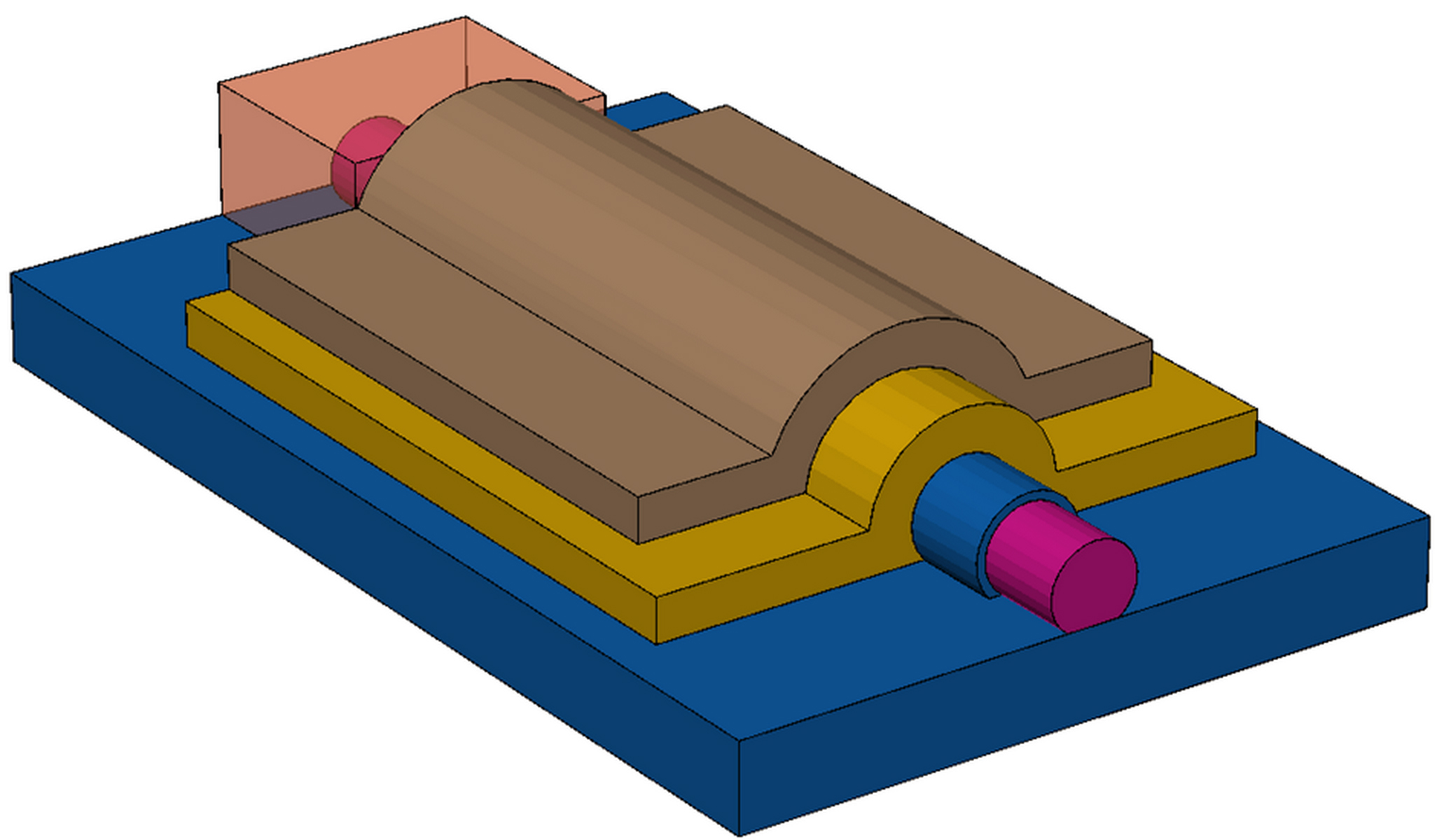
Schematic of silicon nanowire device

Silicon nanowires or SiNWs, are a type of semiconductor nanowire most often formed from a silicon precursor by etching of a solid or through catalyzed growth from a vapor or liquid phase. The physical and chemical characteristics of silicon nanowires differ from those of bulk silicon material, which could lead to applications in lithium-ion batteries, thermoelectrics and sensors. Initial synthesis of SiNWs is often accompanied by thermal oxidation steps to yield structures of accurately tailored size and morphology.

SiNWs have unique properties that are not seen in bulk (three-dimensional) silicon materials. These properties arise from an unusual quasi one-dimensional electronic structure and are the subject of research across numerous disciplines and applications. The reason that SiNWs are considered one of the most important one-dimensional materials is they could have a function as building blocks for nanoscale electronics assembled without the need for complex and costly fabrication facilities. SiNWs are frequently studied towards applications including photovoltaics, nanowire batteries, thermoelectrics and non-volatile memory.

== Applications ==
SiNWs exhibit charge trapping behavior which renders such systems of value in applications necessitating electron hole separation such as photovoltaics, and photocatalysts. Experiment on nanowire solar cells has led to a improvement of the power conversion efficiency of SiNW solar cells from <1% to >17%.

The ability for lithium ions to intercalate into silicon structures renders various Si nanostructures of interest towards applications as anodes in Li-ion batteries (LiBs). SiNWs are of interest as such anodes as they exhibit the ability to undergo significant lithiation while maintaining structural integrity and electrical connectivity.

Silicon nanowires are efficient thermoelectric generators because they combine a high electrical conductivity, owing to the bulk properties of doped Si, with low thermal conductivity due to the small cross section.

=== Silicon nanowire field-effect transistor (SiNWFET) ===
Charge trapping behavior and tunable surface governed transport properties of SiNWs render this category of nanostructures of interest towards use as metal insulator semiconductors and field effect transistors, where the silicon nanowire is the main channel of the FET which connect the source to the drain terminal, facilitating electron transfer between the two terminals with further applications as nano-electronic storage devices, in flash memory, logic devices as well as chemical, gas and biological sensors.

After SiNWFET were first reported in 2001, there was interest in the sensor area, because of their superior physical properties such as high carrier mobility, high current switch ratio, and close to ideal subthreshold slope. Furthermore, they are cost-efficient and could be manufactured on large scale, since it is compatible with CMOS fabricating technology. Specifically, in bioresearch, SiNWFET has high sensitivity and specificity to biological targets and could offer label-free detection after being modified with small biological molecules to match the target object. SiNWFET could be fabricated in arrays and be selectively functionalized, which enables the simultaneous detection and analysis of multiple targets.

== Synthesis ==
Several synthesis methods are known for SiNWs and these can be broadly divided into methods which start with bulk silicon and remove material to yield nanowires, also known as top-down synthesis, and methods which use a chemical or vapor precursor to build nanowires in a process generally considered to be bottom-up synthesis.

=== Top down synthesis methods ===
These methods use material removal techniques to produce nanostructures from a bulk precursor

- Laser beam ablation
- Ion-beam etching
- Thermal evaporation oxide-assisted growth (OAG)
- Metal-assisted chemical etching (MaCE)

=== Bottom-up synthesis methods ===
- Vapour–liquid–solid (VLS) growth – a type of catalysed CVD often using silane as Si precursor and gold nanoparticles as catalyst (or 'seed').
- Molecular beam epitaxy – a form of PVD applied in plasma environment
- Precipitation from a solution – a variation of the VLS method, aptly named supercritical fluid liquid solid (SFLS), that uses a supercritical fluid (e.g. organosilane at high temperature and pressure) as Si precursor instead of vapor. The catalyst would be a colloid in solution, such as colloidal gold nanoparticles, and the SiNWs are grown in this solution

=== Thermal oxidation ===
Subsequent to physical or chemical processing, either top-down or bottom-up, to obtain initial silicon nanostructures, thermal oxidation steps are often applied in order to obtain materials with desired size and aspect ratio. Silicon nanowires exhibit a distinct and useful self-limiting oxidation behaviour whereby oxidation effectively ceases due to diffusion limitations, which can be modeled. This phenomenon allows accurate control of dimensions and aspect ratios in SiNWs and has been used to obtain high aspect ratio SiNWs with diameters below 5 nm.
