= Ammonium tetrafluoroborate =

Chemical compound

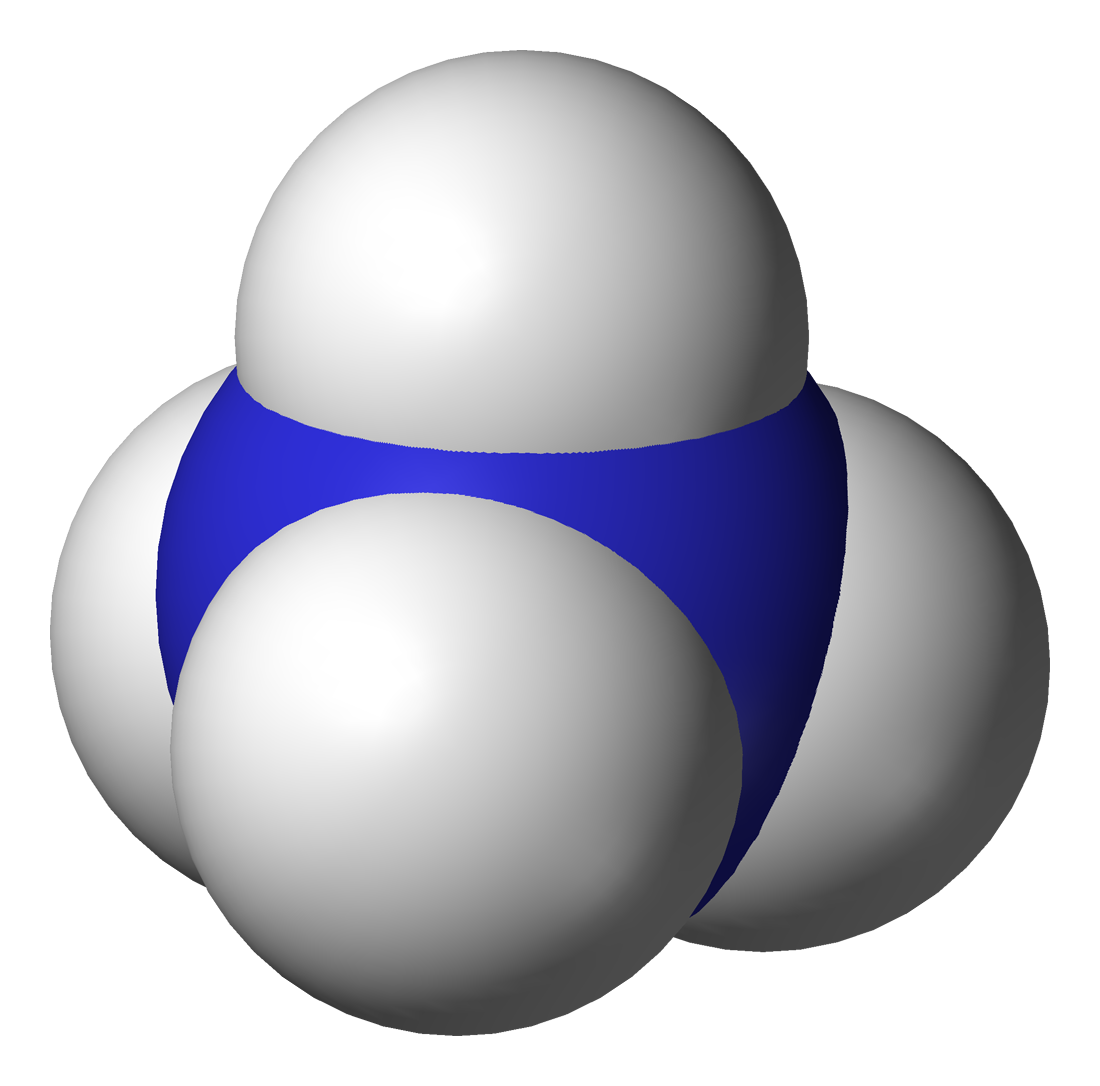

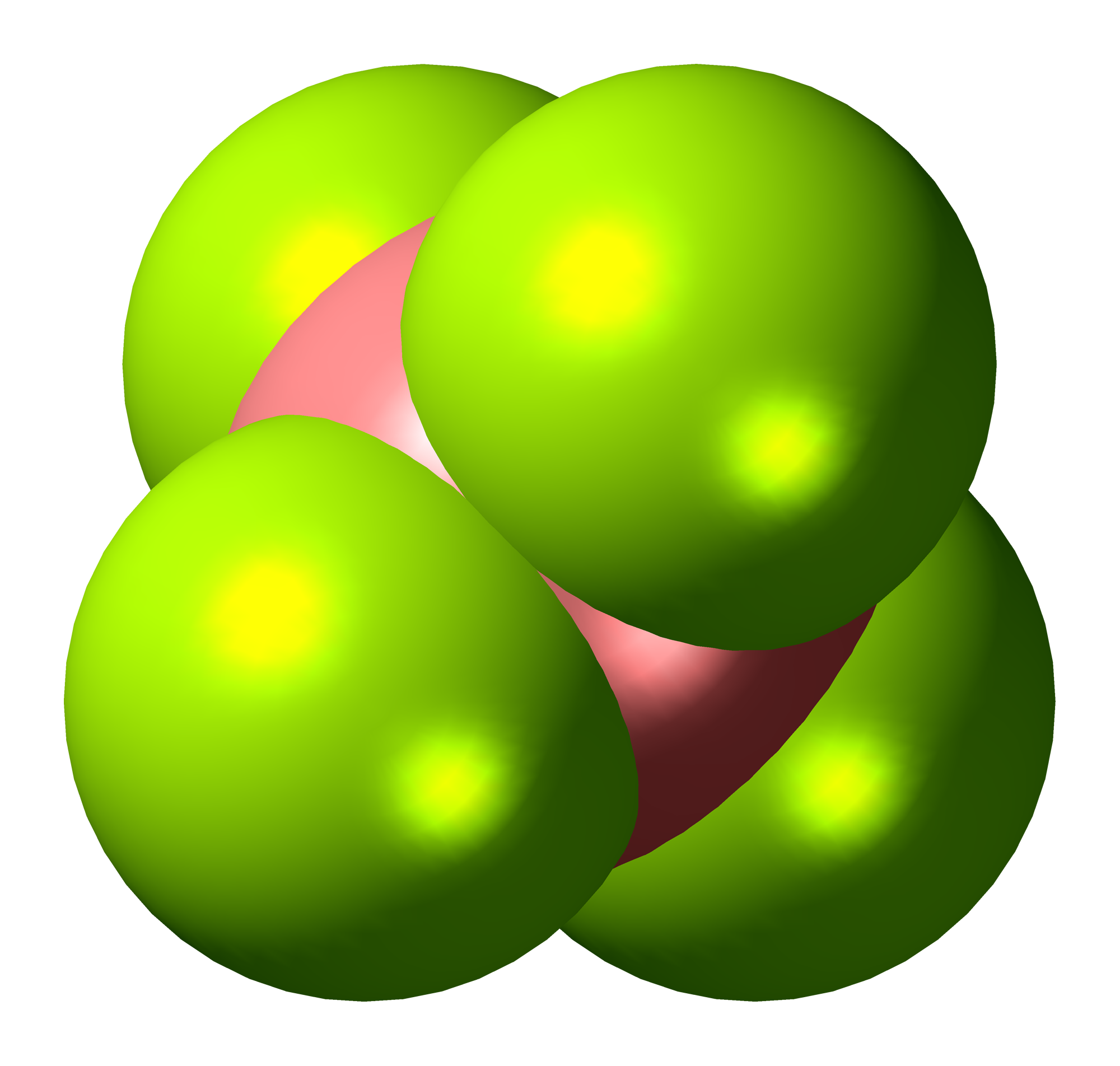

Names
- IUPAC name Ammonium tetrafluoroborate
- Other names: Ammonium fluoroborate

Identifiers
CAS Number	13826-83-0
3D model (JSmol)	Interactive image
ChemSpider	8139666
ECHA InfoCard	100.034.106
EC Number	237-531-4
PubChem CID	9964072
UNII	C945Z80O8X
UN number	1759 3077
CompTox Dashboard (EPA)	DTXSID8065660
- InChI: InChI=1S/BF4.H3N/c2-1(3,4)5;/h;1H3/q-1;/p+1 Key: PDTKOBRZPAIMRD-UHFFFAOYSA-O
- SMILES: [B-](F)(F)(F)F.[NH4+]

Properties
Chemical formula	NH_{4}BF_{4}
Molar mass	104.85 g/mol
Appearance	Colorless to white crystals
Density	1.871 g/cm^{3}
Melting point	220-230 °C (Sublimes)
Boiling point	N/A
Solubility in water	3.09 g/100 ml (−1.0 °C); 5.26 g/100 ml (−1.5 °C); 10.85 g/100 ml (−2.7 °C); 12.20 g/100 ml (0 °C); 25 g/100 ml (16 °C); 25.83 g/100 ml (25 °C); 44.09 g/100 ml (50 °C); 67.50 g/100 ml (75 °C); 98.93 g/100 ml (100 °C); 113.7 g/100 ml (108.5 °C)
Solubility	Ammonium hydroxide

Hazards
- Occupational safety and health (OHS/OSH)
Main hazards	Corrosive, irritant, toxic if ingested
- GHS labelling
Pictograms	(GHS05: Corrosive) (GHS07: Exclamation mark)
Signal word	Warning
Hazard statements	H290, H314, H315, H319, H335
Precautionary statements	P234, P260, P264, P271, P280, P301+P330+P331, P302+P352, P303+P361+P353, P304+P340, P305+P351+P338, P310, P312, P321, P332+P313, P337+P313, P362, P363, P390, P403+P233, P404, P405, P501
- Safety data sheet (SDS)

Related compounds
Other anions	Tetrafluoroborate
Other cations	Ammonium
- Except where otherwise noted, data are given for materials in their standard state (at 25 °C [77 °F], 100 kPa). Infobox references

Ammonium tetrafluoroborate (or ammonium fluoroborate) is an inorganic salt composed of the ammonium cation and the tetrafluoroborate anion, with the chemical formula NH_{4}BF_{4}. When heated to decomposition, ammonium tetrafluoroborate releases toxic fumes of hydrogen fluoride, nitrogen oxides, and ammonia.

== Preparation ==
Ammonium tetrafluoroborate can be prepared by reacting ammonium fluoride with boric and sulfuric acid:

8 NH_{4}F + 2 H_{3}BO_{3} + 3 H_{2}SO_{4} → 2 NH_{4}BF_{4} + 3 (NH_{4})_{2}SO_{4} + 6 H_{2}O
