= Extended metal atom chains =

Chain of organometallic compounds

In organometallic chemistry, extended metal atom chains (EMACs) are molecules that consist of a linear chain of directly bonded metal atoms, surrounded by organic ligands. These compounds represent the smallest molecular wires. Such species are researched for the bottom-up approach to nanoelectronics, although no applications are near term.

== Structure ==
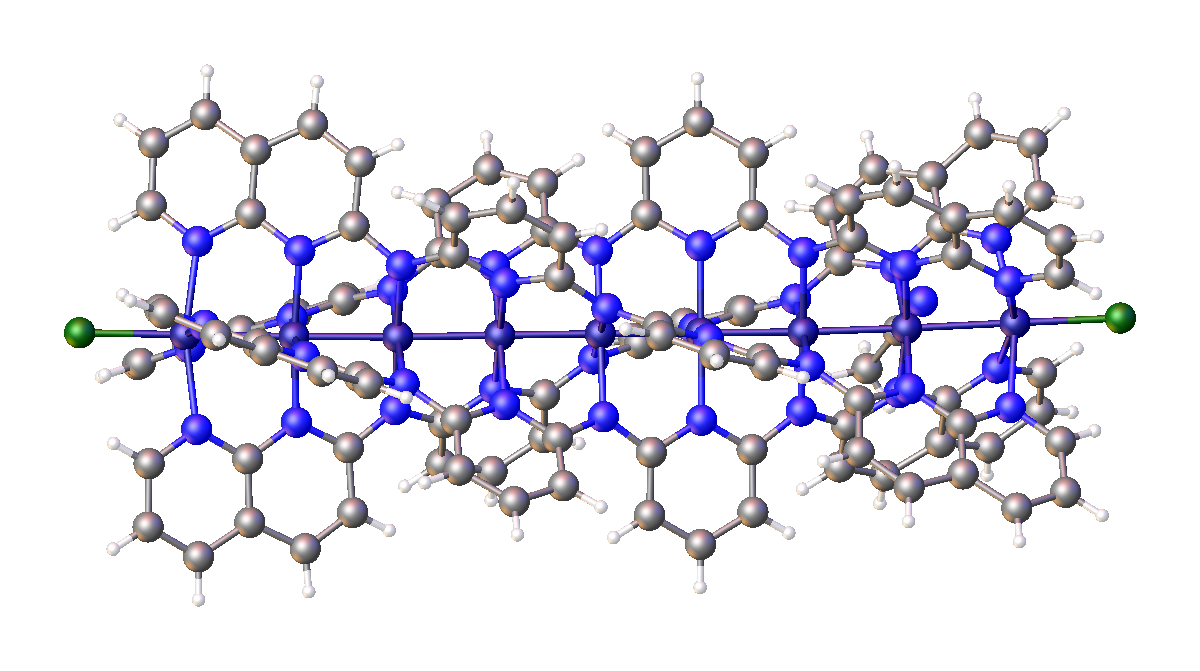
An Ni_{9} EMAC.

An EMAC molecule contains a linear string of transition metals (typically Cr, Co, Ni, or Cu) that are bonded to each other and surrounded helically by organic ligands. The metal chains are usually end-capped by anions, usually halides. The organic ligands often pyridylamide, pyridone, naphthyridine, or their derivatives. Each metal atom is six-coordinate, bonded to two other metals along the axis of the molecule (except terminal metals, which are bonded to one metal and one capping anion) and to four nitrogen atoms perpendicular to the axis.

The organic ligands template the formation of the chains by bringing the metal ions together and aligning them into a linear string. The number of nitrogen atoms in the ligand determines the number of metal atoms that will be incorporated into the chain. Thus, the synthesis yields molecular wires of predetermined length. This feature, in combination with the fact that the molecules have well-defined ends, differentiates EMACs from other kinds of molecular wires: EMACs exist only as distinct molecular entities, they do not aggregate and they do not form periodic structures of repeating units.

Most known EMACs contain from three to nine metal atoms. The longest EMACs that have been constructed so far incorporate eleven Ni atoms and have a length of approximately 2 nanometers, although it is estimated that chains with up to 17 metal atoms (4-5 nanometers) could be accessed with currently available ligands.

In contrast with EMACs, linear chain compounds are infinite in length. They are not terminated with capping ligands.

== Early development and debate ==
The first EMACs with three metal atoms were synthesized in the early 1990s independently by the groups of Shie-Ming Peng (NTU) and F. Albert Cotton (Texas A&M), who coined the term extended metal atom chains. The cobalt-containing molecule Co_{3}(dpa)_{4}Cl_{2} (dpa = 2,2'-dipyridylamide) was synthesized by both research groups, but each proposed a different structure: the group from Taiwan reported an unsymmetric structure with a long and a short Co-Co bond, whereas the Texas group identified a symmetric structure with equal Co-Co bond lengths. This disagreement sparked a controversy that lasted for years, until it was realized that both forms of the molecule actually exist simultaneously. While this debate led to the realization that the compound can be used as a molecular switch, it also created a new problem since none of the recognized types of isomerism could explain the existence of a molecule in two structural forms that differ only in the length of one or more bonds (and not in their stereochemistry or connectivity of the atoms). The problem was finally resolved through a quantum chemical study by Pantazis and McGrady, who showed that the two structural forms result from different electronic configurations. The Pantazis-McGrady model is currently used to understand the different electronic states and interpret the magnetic properties of EMACs.

== Potential applications ==
EMACs have no commercial applications, but they are of potential use as electrical conductors in nanocircuits. Moreover, conductance can be controlled and fine-tuned by oxidation or reduction of the metal chain, opening the way for the construction of molecular rheostats, switches, and transistors. These possibilities have been demonstrated:

- "single-molecule transistors" incorporating the trinuclear dipyridylamido compounds Cu_{3}(dpa)_{4}Cl_{2} and Ni_{3}(dpa)_{4}Cl_{2} (dpa=dipyridylamide), fabricated on oxidized silicon substrates with aluminum gate electrodes.
- "stochastic switches" made of penta- and heptachromium EMACs attached to a gold surface.

== See also ==
- molecular wires
- molecular electronics
