= Molecular wire =

Electrically conductive molecular chains

Molecular wires (or sometimes called molecular nanowires) are molecular chains that conduct electric current. They are the proposed building blocks for molecular electronic devices. Their typical diameters are less than three nanometers, while their lengths may be macroscopic, extending to centimeters or more.

== Examples ==
Most types of molecular wires are derived from organic molecules. One naturally occurring molecular wire is DNA. Prominent inorganic examples include polymeric materials such as Li_{2}Mo_{6}Se_{6} and Mo_{6}S_{9−x}I_{x}, [Pd_{4}(CO)_{4}(OAc)_{4}Pd(acac)_{2}], and single-molecule extended metal atom chains (EMACs) which comprise strings of transition metal atoms directly bonded to each other. Molecular wires containing paramagnetic inorganic moieties can exhibit Kondo peaks.

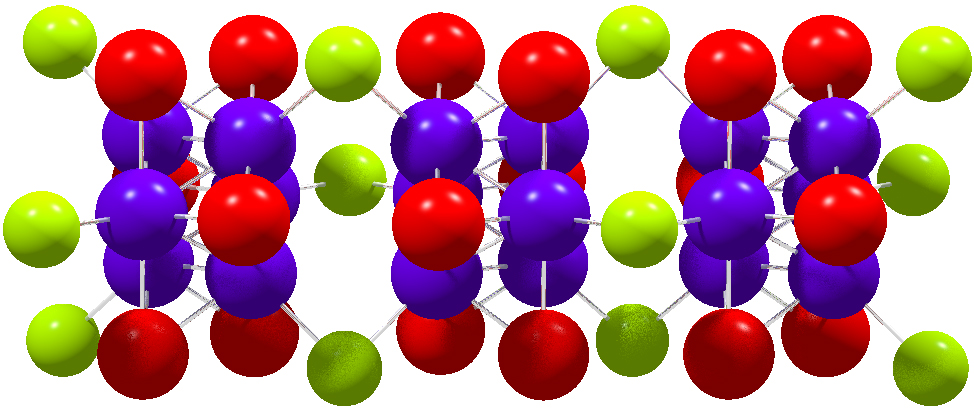
The structure of a Mo_{6}S_{9−x}I_{x} molecular wire. Mo atoms are blue, iodine atoms are red and sulphur atoms are yellow.

== Conduction of electrons ==
Molecular wires conduct electricity. They typically have non-linear current-voltage characteristics, and do not behave as simple ohmic conductors. The conductance follows typical power law behavior as a function of temperature or electric field, whichever is the greater, arising from their strong one-dimensional character. Numerous theoretical ideas have been used in an attempt to understand the conductivity of one-dimensional systems, where strong interactions between electrons lead to departures from normal metallic (Fermi liquid) behavior. Important concepts are those introduced by Tomonaga, Luttinger and Wigner. Effects caused by classical Coulomb repulsion (called Coulomb blockade), interactions with vibrational degrees of freedom (called phonons) and Quantum Decoherence have also been found to be important in determining the properties of molecular wires.

== Synthesis ==
Methods have been developed for the synthesis of diverse types of molecular wires (e.g. organic molecular wires and inorganic molecular wires). The basic principle is to assemble repeating modules. Organic molecular wires are usually synthesized via transition metal-mediated cross-coupling reactions.

=== Organic molecular wires ===
Organic molecular wires usually consist aromatic rings connected by ethylene group or acetylene groups. Transition metal-mediated cross-coupling reactions are used to connect simple building blocks together in a convergent fashion to build organic molecular wires. For example, a simple oligo (phenylene ethylnylene) type molecular wire (B) was synthesized starting from readily available 1-bromo-4-iodobenzene (A). The final product was obtained through several steps of Sonogashira coupling reactions.

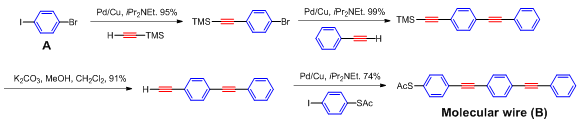
Synthesis of a simple organic molecular wire.

Other organic molecular wires include carbon nanotubes and DNA. Carbon nanotubes can be synthesized via various nano-technological approaches. DNA can be prepared by either step-wise DNA synthesis on solid-phase or by DNA-polymerase-catalyzed replication inside cells.

It was recently shown that pyridine and pyridine-derived polymers can form electronically conductive polyazaacetylene chains under simple ultraviolet irradiation, and that the common observation of "browning" of aged pyridine samples is due in part to the formation of molecular wires. The gels exhibited a transition between ionic conductivity and electronic conductivity on irradiation.

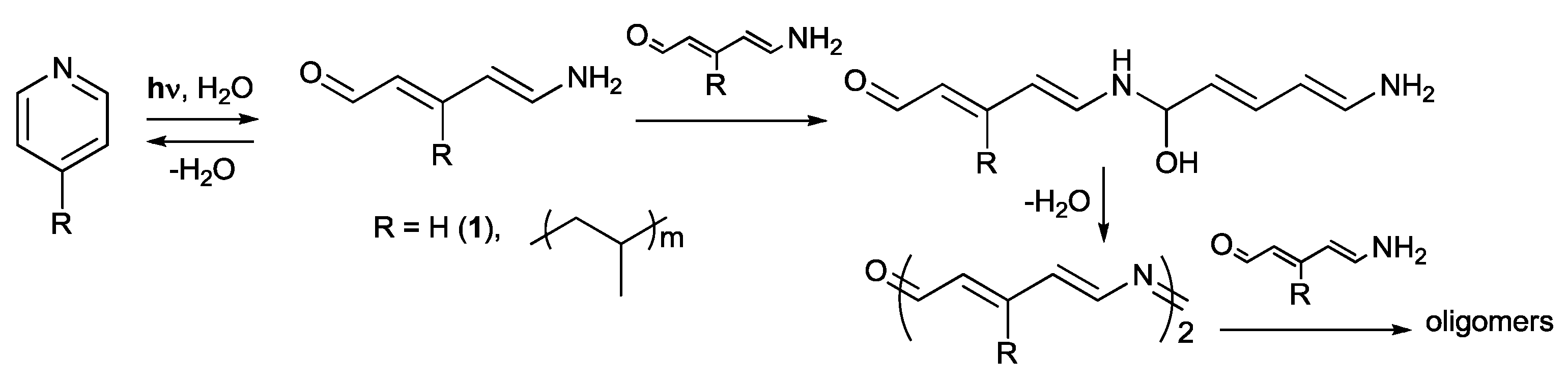
Formation of polyazaacetylenes from poly-(4-vinyl)pyridine under ultraviolet light

=== Inorganic molecular wires ===
One class of inorganic molecular wires consist of subunits related to Chevrel clusters. The synthesis of Mo_{6}S_{9−x}I_{x} was performed in sealed and vacuumed quartz ampoule at 1343 K. In Mo_{6}S_{9−x}I_{x}, the repeat units are Mo_{6}S_{9−x}I_{x} clusters, which are joined together by flexible sulfur or iodine bridges.

Chains can also be produced from metallo-organic precursors.

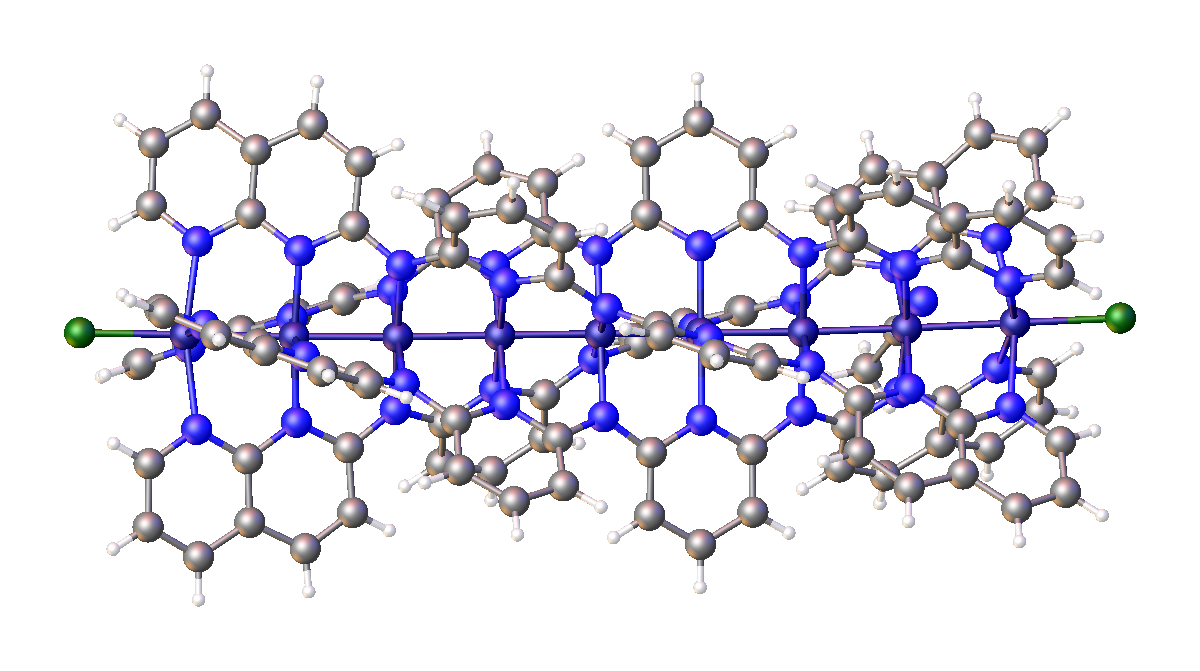
Illustrative of the coordination chemistry approach to molecular wires are extended metal atom chains, e.g. this Ni_{9} complex.

== Nanowires in molecular electronics ==
To be of use for connecting molecules, MWs need to self-assemble following well-defined routes and form reliable electrical contacts between them. To reproducibly self-assemble a complex circuit based on single molecules. Ideally, they would connect to diverse materials, such as gold metal surfaces (for connections to outside world), biomolecules (for nanosensors, nanoelectrodes, molecular switches) and most importantly, they must allow branching. The connectors should also be available of pre-determined diameter and length. They should also have covalent bonding to ensure reproducible transport and contact properties.

DNA-like molecules have specific molecular-scale recognition and can be used in molecular scaffold fabrication. Complex shapes have been demonstrated, but unfortunately metal coated DNA which is electrically conducting is too thick to connect to individual molecules. Thinner coated DNA lacks electronic connectivity and is unsuited for connecting molecular electronics components.

Some varieties of carbon nanotubes (CNTs) are conducting, and connectivity at their ends can be achieved by attachment of connecting groups. Unfortunately manufacturing CNTs with pre-determined properties is impossible at present, and the functionalized ends are typically not conducting, limiting their usefulness as molecular connectors. Individual CNTs can be soldered in an electron microscope, but the contact is not covalent and cannot be self-assembled.

Possible routes for the construction of larger functional circuits using Mo_{6}S_{9−x}I_{x} MWs have been demonstrated, either via gold nanoparticles as linkers, or by direct connection to thiolated molecules. The two approaches may lead to different possible applications. The use of GNPs offers the possibility of branching and construction of larger circuits.

=== Other research ===
Molecular wires can be incorporated into polymers, enhancing their mechanical and/or conducting properties. The enhancement of these properties relies on uniform dispersion of the wires into the host polymer. MoSI wires have been made in such composites, relying on their superior solubility within the polymer host compared to other nanowires or nanotubes. Bundles of wires can be used to enhance tribological properties of polymers, with applications in actuators and potentiometers. It has been recently proposed that twisted nanowires could work as electromechanical nanodevices (or torsion nanobalances) to measure forces and torques at nanoscale with great precision.
