= Nanowire =

Wire with a diameter in the nanometres

Crystalline 2×2-atom tin selenide nanowire grown inside a single-wall carbon nanotube (tube diameter ≈1 nm).

A nanowire is a nanostructure in the form of a wire with the diameter of the order of nanometres (10^{−9} m). More generally, nanowires can be defined as structures that have a thickness or diameter constrained to tens of nanometers or less and an unconstrained length. At these scales, quantum mechanical effects play an important role—which coined the term "quantum wires".

Many different types of nanowires exist, including superconducting (e.g. YBCO), metallic (e.g. Ni, Pt, Au, Ag, Nb), semiconducting (e.g. silicon nanowires (SiNWs), III-V compounds) and insulating (e.g. SiO_{2}, TiO_{2}). Molecular nanowires are composed of repeating molecular units either organic (e.g. DNA) or inorganic (e.g. Mo_{6}S_{9−x}I_{x}). Because of their small size, nanowires are synthesized using various nanofabrication methods.

The physical properties (e.g. conductance, mechanical strength) of nanowires can differ greatly from the corresponding bulk material, which makes them interesting for electronic, mechanical and optical applications.

== Characteristics ==
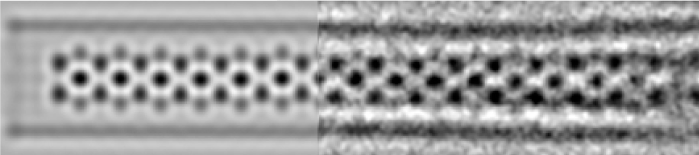
A noise-filtered HRTEM image of a HgTe extreme nanowire embedded down the central pore of a SWCNT. The image is also accompanied by a simulation of the crystal structure

Typical nanowires exhibit aspect ratios (length-to-width ratio) of 1000 or more. As such they are often referred to as one-dimensional (1-D) materials. Nanowires have many interesting properties that are not seen in bulk or 3-D (three-dimensional) materials. This is because electrons in nanowires are quantum confined laterally and thus occupy energy levels that are different from the traditional continuum of energy levels or bands found in bulk materials.

A consequence of this quantum confinement in nanowires is that they exhibit discrete values of the electrical conductance. Such discrete values arise from a quantum mechanical constraint on the number electronic transport channels at the nanometer scale, and they are often approximately equal to integer multiples of the quantum of conductance:

$$\frac{2e^2}{h} \simeq 77.41\; \mu S$$

This conductance is twice the reciprocal of the resistance unit called the von Klitzing constant, R_{K} = 25812.80745... Ω, defined as R_{K} = h/e^{2} and named for Klaus von Klitzing, the discoverer of the integer quantum Hall effect.

Examples of nanowires include inorganic molecular nanowires (Mo_{6}S_{9−x}I_{x}, Li_{2}Mo_{6}Se_{6}), which can have a diameter of 0.9 nm and be hundreds of micrometers long. Other important examples are based on semiconductors such as InP, Si, GaN, etc., dielectrics (e.g. SiO_{2},TiO_{2}), or metals (e.g. Ni, Pt).

There are many applications where nanowires may become important in electronic, opto-electronic and nanoelectromechanical devices, as additives in advanced composites, for metallic interconnects in nanoscale quantum devices, as field-emitters and as leads for biomolecular nanosensors.

== Synthesis ==
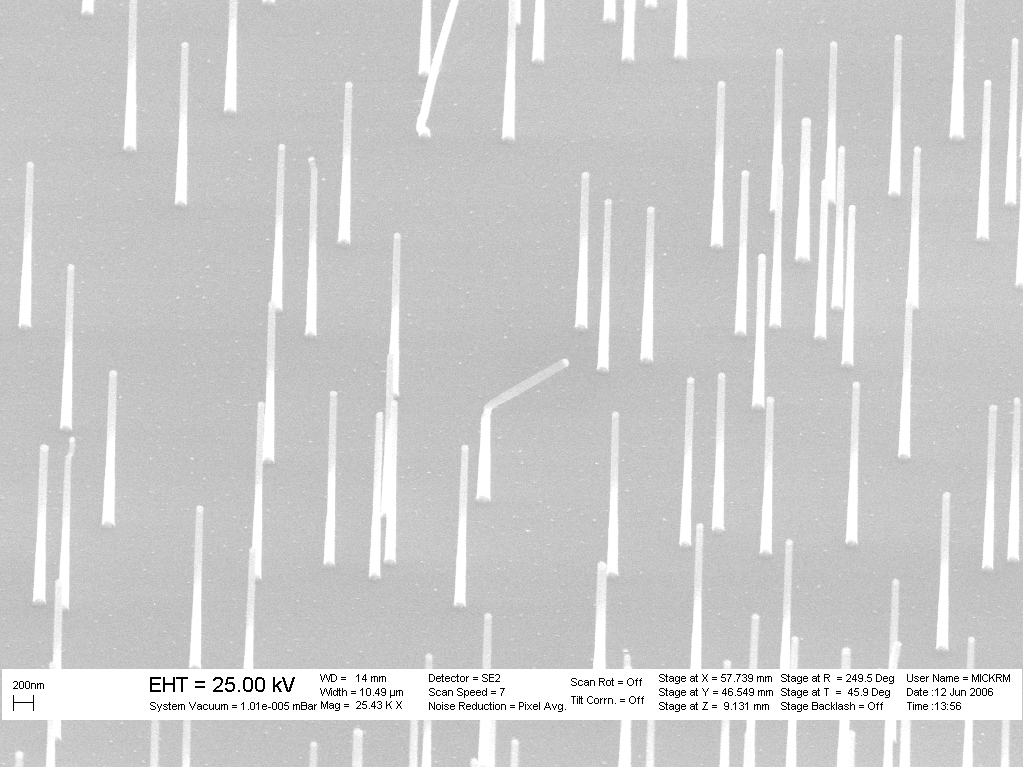
An SEM image of epitaxial nanowire heterostructures grown from catalytic gold nanoparticles

There are two basic approaches to synthesizing nanowires: top-down and bottom-up. A top-down approach reduces a large piece of material to small pieces, by various means such as lithography, milling or thermal oxidation. A bottom-up approach synthesizes the nanowire by combining constituent adatoms. Most synthesis techniques use a bottom-up approach. Initial synthesis via either method may often be followed by a nanowire thermal treatment step, often involving a form of self-limiting oxidation, to fine tune the size and aspect ratio of the structures. After the bottom-up synthesis, nanowires can be integrated using pick-and-place techniques.

Nanowire production uses several common laboratory techniques, including suspension, electrochemical deposition, vapor deposition, and VLS growth. Ion track technology enables growing homogeneous and segmented nanowires down to 8 nm diameter. As nanowire oxidation rate is controlled by diameter, thermal oxidation steps are often applied to tune their morphology.

=== Suspension ===
A suspended nanowire is a wire produced in a high-vacuum chamber held at the longitudinal extremities. Suspended nanowires can be produced by:

- The chemical etching of a larger wire
- The bombardment of a larger wire, typically with highly energetic ions
- Indenting the tip of a STM in the surface of a metal near its melting point, and then retracting it

=== VLS growth ===
A common technique for creating a nanowire is vapor–liquid–solid method (VLS), which was first reported by Wagner and Ellis in 1964 for silicon whiskers with diameters ranging from hundreds of nm to hundreds of μm. This process can produce high-quality crystalline nanowires of many semiconductor materials, for example, VLS–grown single crystalline silicon nanowires (SiNWs) with smooth surfaces could have excellent properties, such as ultra-large elasticity. This method uses a source material from either laser ablated particles or a feed gas such as silane.

VLS synthesis requires a catalyst. For nanowires, the best catalysts are liquid metal (such as gold) nanoclusters, which can either be self-assembled from a thin film by dewetting, or purchased in colloidal form and deposited on a substrate.

The source enters these nanoclusters and begins to saturate them. On reaching supersaturation, the source solidifies and grows outward from the nanocluster. Simply turning off the source can adjust the final length of the nanowire. Switching sources while still in the growth phase can create compound nanowires with super-lattices of alternating materials. For example, a method termed ENGRAVE (Encoded Nanowire GRowth and Appearance through VLS and Etching) developed by the Cahoon Lab at UNC-Chapel Hill allows for nanometer-scale morphological control via rapid in situ dopant modulation.

A single-step vapour phase reaction at elevated temperature synthesises inorganic nanowires such as Mo_{6}S_{9−x}I_{x}. From another point of view, such nanowires are cluster polymers.

Similar to VLS synthesis, VSS (vapor-solid-solid) synthesis of nanowires (NWs) proceeds through thermolytic decomposition of a silicon precursor (typically phenylsilane). Unlike VLS, the catalytic seed remains in solid state when subjected to high temperature annealing of the substrate. This such type of synthesis is widely used to synthesise metal silicide/germanide nanowires through VSS alloying between a copper substrate and a silicon/germanium precursor.

=== Solution-phase synthesis ===
Solution-phase synthesis refers to techniques that grow nanowires in solution. They can produce nanowires of many types of materials. Solution-phase synthesis has the advantage that it can produce very large quantities, compared to other methods. In one technique, the polyol synthesis, ethylene glycol is both solvent and reducing agent. This technique is particularly versatile at producing nanowires of gold, lead, platinum, and silver.

The supercritical fluid-liquid-solid growth method can be used to synthesize semiconductor nanowires, e.g., Si and Ge. By using metal nanocrystals as seeds, Si and Ge organometallic precursors are fed into a reactor filled with a supercritical organic solvent, such as toluene. Thermolysis results in degradation of the precursor, allowing release of Si or Ge, and dissolution into the metal nanocrystals. As more of the semiconductor solute is added from the supercritical phase (due to a concentration gradient), a solid crystallite precipitates, and a nanowire grows uniaxially from the nanocrystal seed.

=== Liquid Bridge Induced Self-assembly ===
Protein nanowires in spider silk have been formed by rolling a droplet of spider silk solution over a superhydrophobic pillar structure.

=== Non-catalytic growth ===
In situ observation of CuO nanowire growth

The vast majority of nanowire-formation mechanisms are explained through the use of catalytic nanoparticles, which drive the nanowire growth and are either added intentionally or generated during the growth. However, nanowires can be also grown without the help of catalysts, which gives an advantage of pure nanowires and minimizes the number of technological steps. The mechanisms for catalyst-free growth of nanowires (or whiskers) were known from 1950s.

The simplest methods to obtain metal oxide nanowires use ordinary heating of the metals, e.g. metal wire heated with battery, by Joule heating in air can be easily done at home. Spontaneous nanowire formation by non-catalytic methods were explained by the dislocation present in specific directions or the growth anisotropy of various crystal faces. Nanowires can grow by screw dislocations or twin boundaries were demonstrated. The picture on the right shows a single atomic layer growth on the tip of CuO nanowire, observed by in situ TEM microscopy during the non-catalytic synthesis of nanowire.

Atomic-scale nanowires can also form completely self-organised without need for defects. For example, rare-earth silicide (RESi_{2}) nanowires of few nm width and height and several 100 nm length form on silicon(001) substrates which are covered with a sub-monolayer of a rare earth metal and subsequently annealed. The lateral dimensions of the nanowires confine the electrons in such a way that the system resembles a (quasi-)one-dimensional metal. Metallic RESi_{2} nanowires form on silicon(hhk) as well. This system permits tuning the dimensionality between two-dimensional and one-dimensional by the coverage and the tilt angle of the substrate.

=== DNA-templated metallic nanowire synthesis ===
An emerging field is to use DNA strands as scaffolds for metallic nanowire synthesis. This method is investigated both for the synthesis of metallic nanowires in electronic components and for biosensing applications, in which they allow the transduction of a DNA strand into a metallic nanowire that can be electrically detected. Typically, ssDNA strands are stretched, whereafter they are decorated with metallic nanoparticles that have been functionalised with short complementary ssDNA strands.

=== Crack-Defined Shadow Mask Lithography ===
Optical lithography is a simple method to produce nanowires . In this approach, optical lithography is used to generate nanogaps using controlled crack formation. These nanogaps are then used as shadow mask for generating individual nanowires with precise lengths and widths. This technique allows to produce individual nanowires below 20 nm in width in a scalable way out of several metallic and metal oxide materials.

== Physics ==
=== Conductivity ===
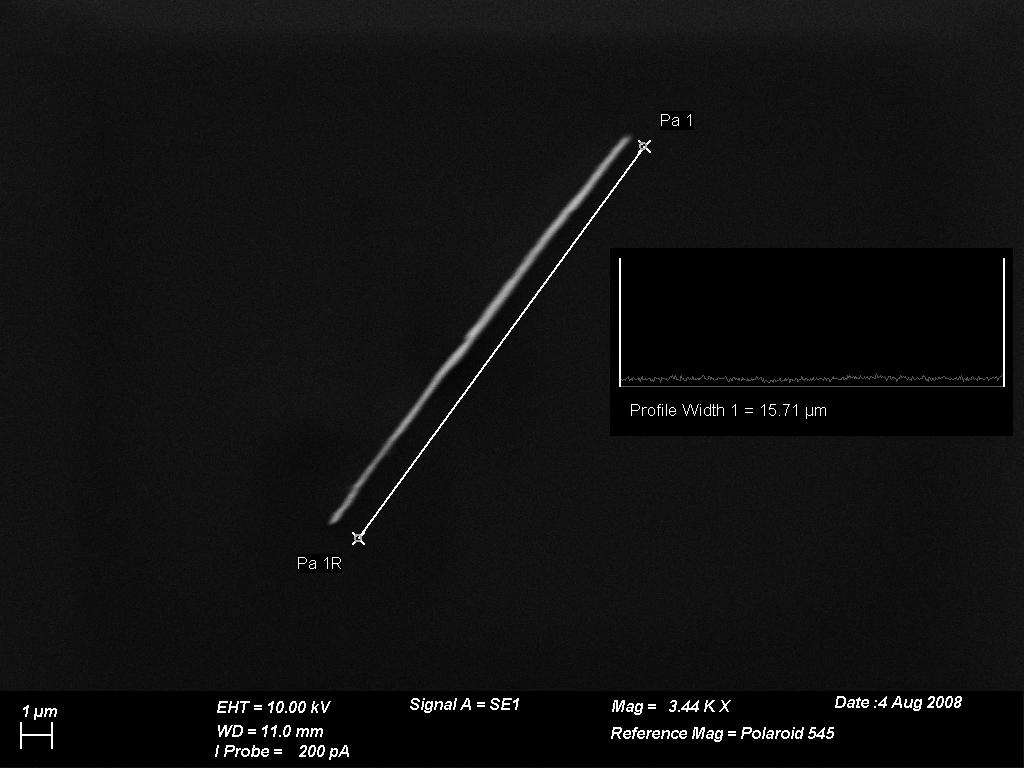
An SEM image of a 15 micrometer nickel wire

Several physical reasons predict that the conductivity of a nanowire will be much less than that of the corresponding bulk material. First, there is scattering from the wire boundaries, whose effect will be very significant whenever the wire width is below the free electron mean free path of the bulk material. In copper, for example, the mean free path is 40 nm. Copper nanowires less than 40 nm wide will shorten the mean free path to the wire width. Silver nanowires have very different electrical and thermal conductivity from bulk silver.

Nanowires also show other peculiar electrical properties due to their size. Unlike single wall carbon nanotubes, whose motion of electrons can fall under the regime of ballistic transport (meaning the electrons can travel freely from one electrode to the other), nanowire conductivity is strongly influenced by edge effects. The edge effects come from atoms that lay at the nanowire surface and are not fully bonded to neighboring atoms like the atoms within the bulk of the nanowire. The unbonded atoms are often a source of defects within the nanowire, and may cause the nanowire to conduct electricity more poorly than the bulk material. As a nanowire shrinks in size, the surface atoms become more numerous compared to the atoms within the nanowire, and edge effects become more important.

The conductance in a nanowire is described as the sum of the transport by separate channels, each having a different electronic wavefunction normal to the wire. The thinner the wire is, the smaller the number of channels available to the transport of electrons. As a result, wires that are only one or a few atoms wide exhibit quantization of the conductance: i.e. the conductance can assume only discrete values that are multiples of the conductance quantum G_{0} = 2e^{2}/h (where e is the elementary charge and h is the Planck constant) (see also Quantum Hall effect). This quantization has been observed by measuring the conductance of a nanowire suspended between two electrodes while pulling it progressively longer: as its diameter reduces, its conductivity decreases in a stepwise fashion and the plateaus correspond approximately to multiples of G_{0}.

The quantization of conductivity is more pronounced in semiconductors like Si or GaAs than in metals, because of their lower electron density and lower effective mass. It can be observed in 25 nm wide silicon fins, and results in increased threshold voltage. In practical terms, this means that a MOSFET with such nanoscale silicon fins, when used in digital applications, will need a higher gate (control) voltage to switch the transistor on.

=== Welding ===
Nanowires can be welded together: a sacrificial metal nanowire is placed adjacent to the ends of the pieces to be joined (using the manipulators of a scanning electron microscope); then an electric current is applied, which fuses the wire ends. The technique fuses wires as small as 10 nm.

For nanowires with diameters less than 10 nm, existing welding techniques, which require precise control of the heating mechanism and which may introduce the possibility of damage, will not be practical. Single-crystalline ultrathin gold nanowires with diameters ≈ 3–10 nm can be "cold-welded" together within seconds by mechanical contact alone, and under remarkably low applied pressures (unlike macro- and micro-scale cold welding process). High-resolution transmission electron microscopy and in situ measurements reveal that the welds are nearly perfect, with the same crystal orientation, strength and electrical conductivity as the rest of the nanowire. The high quality of the welds is attributed to the nanoscale sample dimensions, oriented-attachment mechanisms and mechanically assisted fast surface diffusion. Nanowire welds were also demonstrated between gold and silver, and silver nanowires (with diameters ≈ 5–15 nm) at near room temperature, indicating that this technique may be generally applicable for ultrathin metallic nanowires. Combined with other nano- and microfabrication technologies, cold welding is anticipated to have potential applications in the future bottom-up assembly of metallic one-dimensional nanostructures.

=== Mechanical properties ===
Simulation of a nanowire fracturing

The study of nanowire mechanics has boomed since the advent of the atomic force microscope (AFM), and associated technologies which have enabled direct study of the response of the nanowire to an applied load. Specifically, a nanowire can be clamped from one end, and the free end displaced by an AFM tip. In this cantilever geometry, the height of the AFM is precisely known, and the force applied is precisely known. This allows for construction of a force vs. displacement curve, which can be converted to a stress vs. strain curve if the nanowire dimensions are known. From the stress-strain curve, the elastic constant known as the Young's Modulus can be derived, as well as the toughness, and degree of strain-hardening.

==== Young's modulus ====
Stress-strain curve provides all the relevant mechanical properties including; tensile modulus, yield strength, ultimate tensile strength, and fracture strength

The elastic component of the stress-strain curve described by the Young's Modulus, has been reported for nanowires, however the modulus depends very strongly on the microstructure. Thus a complete description of the modulus dependence on diameter is lacking. Analytically, continuum mechanics has been applied to estimate the dependence of modulus on diameter: $E=E_{0}[1+4(E_{0}/E_{s}-1)(r_{s}/D-r_{s}^{2}/D^{2})]$ in tension, where $E_{0}$ is the bulk modulus, $r_{s}$ is the thickness of a shell layer in which the modulus is surface dependent and varies from the bulk, $E{s}$ is the surface modulus, and $D$ is the diameter. This equation implies that the modulus increases as the diameter decreases. However, various computational methods such as molecular dynamics have predicted that modulus should decrease as diameter decreases.

Experimentally, gold nanowires have been shown to have a Young's modulus which is effectively diameter independent. Similarly, nano-indentation was applied to study the modulus of silver nanowires, and again the modulus was found to be 88 GPa, very similar to the modulus of bulk Silver (85 GPa) These works demonstrated that the analytically determined modulus dependence seems to be suppressed in nanowire samples where the crystalline structure highly resembles that of the bulk system.

In contrast, Si solid nanowires have been studied, and shown to have a decreasing modulus with diameter The authors of that work report a Si modulus which is half that of the bulk value, and they suggest that the density of point defects, and or loss of chemical stoichiometry may account for this difference.

==== Yield strength ====
The plastic component of the stress strain curve (or more accurately the onset of plasticity) is described by the yield strength. The strength of a material is increased by decreasing the number of defects in the solid, which occurs naturally in nanomaterials where the volume of the solid is reduced. As a nanowire is shrunk to a single line of atoms, the strength should theoretically increase all the way to the molecular tensile strength. Gold nanowires have been described as 'ultrahigh strength' due to the extreme increase in yield strength, approaching the theoretical value of E/10. This huge increase in yield is determined to be due to the lack of dislocations in the solid. Without dislocation motion, a 'dislocation-starvation' mechanism is in operation. The material can accordingly experience huge stresses before dislocation motion is possible, and then begins to strain-harden. For these reasons, nanowires (historically described as 'whiskers') have been used extensively in composites for increasing the overall strength of a material. Moreover, nanowires continue to be actively studied, with research aiming to translate enhanced mechanical properties to novel devices in the fields of MEMS or NEMS.

== Possible applications ==
=== Electronic devices ===
Atomistic simulation result for formation of inversion channel (electron density) and attainment of threshold voltage (IV) in a nanowire MOSFET. Note that the threshold voltage for this device lies around 0.45V

Nanowires have been proposed for use as MOSFETs (MOS field-effect transistors). MOS transistors are used widely as fundamental building elements in today's electronic circuits. As predicted by Moore's law, the dimension of MOS transistors is shrinking smaller and smaller into nanoscale. One of the key challenges of building future nanoscale MOS transistors is ensuring good gate control over the channel. In general, having a wider gate relative to the total transistor length affords greater gate control. Therefore, the high aspect ratio of nanowires potentially allows for good gate control.

Due to their one-dimensional structure with unusual optical properties, the nanowire are of interest for photovoltaic devices. Compared with its bulk counterparts, the nanowire solar cells are less sensitive to impurities due to bulk recombination, and thus silicon wafers with lower purity can be used to achieve acceptable efficiency, leading to the reduction on material consumption.

After p-n junctions were built with nanowires, the next logical step was to build logic gates. Connecting several p-n junctions creates the basis of all logic circuits: the AND, OR, and NOT gates have all been built from semiconductor nanowire crossings.

NAND gates have been produced from undoped silicon nanowires. This avoids the problem of how to achieve precision doping of complementary nanocircuits, which is unsolved. They were able to control the Schottky barrier to achieve low-resistance contacts by placing a silicide layer in the metal-silicon interface.

It is possible that semiconductor nanowire crossings will be important to the future of digital computing. Though there are other uses for nanowires beyond these, the only ones that actually take advantage of physics in the nanometer regime are electronic.

In addition, nanowires are also being studied for use as photon ballistic waveguides as interconnects in quantum dot/quantum effect well photon logic arrays. Photons travel inside the tube, electrons travel on the outside shell.

When two nanowires acting as photon waveguides cross each other the juncture acts as a quantum dot.

Conducting nanowires offer the possibility of connecting molecular-scale entities in a molecular computer. Dispersions of conducting nanowires in different polymers are being investigated for use as transparent electrodes for flexible flat-screen displays.

Because of their high Young's moduli, their use in mechanically enhancing composites is being investigated. Because nanowires appear in bundles, they may be used as tribological additives to improve friction characteristics and reliability of electronic transducers and actuators.

Because of their high aspect ratio, nanowires are also suited to dielectrophoretic manipulation, which offers a low-cost, bottom-up approach to integrating suspended dielectric metal oxide nanowires in electronic devices such as UV, water vapor, and ethanol sensors.

Due to their large surface-to-volume ratio, physico-chemical reactions are facilitated on the surface of nanowires.

=== Single nanowire devices for gas and chemical sensing ===
The high aspect ratio of nanowires makes this nanostructures suitable for electrochemical sensing with the potential for ultimate sensitivity. One of the challenge for the use of nanowires in commercial products is related to the isolation, handling, and integration of nanowires in an electrical circuit when using the conventional and manual pick-and-place approach, leading to a very limited throughput. Nanowire can be produced by parallel production.

=== Nanowire lasers ===
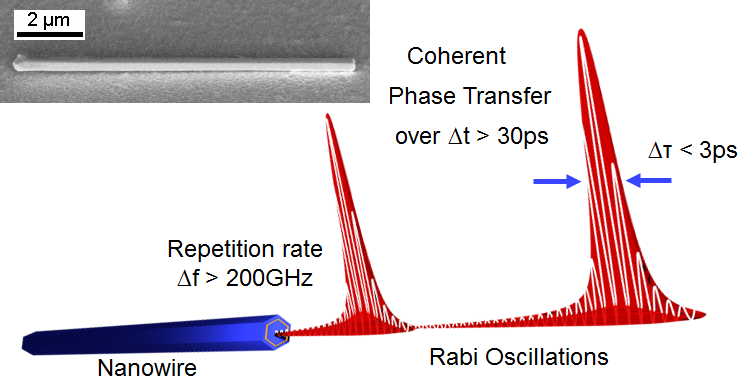
Nanowire lasers for ultrafast transmission of information in light pulses

Nanowire lasers are nano-scaled lasers with potential as optical interconnects and optical data communication on chip. Nanowire lasers are built from III–V semiconductor heterostructures, the high refractive index allows for low optical loss in the nanowire core. Nanowire lasers are subwavelength lasers of only a few hundred nanometers. Nanowire lasers are Fabry–Perot resonator cavities defined by the end facets of the wire with high-reflectivity, have demonstrated repetition rates greater than 200 GHz offering possibilities for optical chip level communications.

=== Sensing of proteins and chemicals using semiconductor nanowires ===
In an analogous way to FET devices in which the modulation of conductance (flow of electrons/holes) in the semiconductor, between the input (source) and the output (drain) terminals, is controlled by electrostatic potential variation (gate-electrode) of the charge carriers in the device conduction channel, the methodology of a Bio/Chem-FET is based on the detection of the local change in charge density, or so-called "field effect", that characterizes the recognition event between a target molecule and the surface receptor.

This change in the surface potential influences the Chem-FET device exactly as a 'gate' voltage does, leading to a detectable and measurable change in the device conduction. When these devices are fabricated using semiconductor nanowires as the transistor element the binding of a chemical or biological species to the surface of the sensor can lead to the depletion or accumulation of charge carriers in the "bulk" of the nanometer diameter nanowire i.e. (small cross section available for conduction channels). Moreover, the wire, which serves as a tunable conducting channel, is in close contact with the sensing environment of the target, leading to a short response time, along with orders of magnitude increase in the sensitivity of the device as a result of the huge S/V ratio of the nanowires.

While several inorganic semiconducting materials such as Si, Ge, and metal oxides (e.g. In_{2}O_{3}, SnO_{2}, ZnO, etc.) have been used for the preparation of nanowires, Si is usually the material of choice when fabricating nanowire FET-based chemo/biosensors.

Several examples of the use of silicon nanowire(SiNW) sensing devices include the ultra sensitive, real-time sensing of biomarker proteins for cancer, detection of single virus particles, and the detection of nitro-aromatic explosive materials such as 2,4,6-tri-nitrotoluene (TNT) in sensitives superior to these of canines. Silicon nanowires could also be used in their twisted form, as electromechanical devices, to measure intermolecular forces with great precision.

==== Limitations of sensing with silicon nanowire FET devices ====
Generally, the charges on dissolved molecules and macromolecules are screened by dissolved counterions, since in most cases molecules bound to the devices are separated from the sensor surface by approximately 2–12 nm (the size of the receptor proteins or DNA linkers bound to the sensor surface). As a result of the screening, the electrostatic potential that arises from charges on the analyte molecule decays exponentially toward zero with distance. Thus, for optimal sensing, the Debye length must be carefully selected for nanowire FET measurements. One approach of overcoming this limitation employs fragmentation of the antibody-capturing units and control over surface receptor density, allowing more intimate binding to the nanowire of the target protein. This approach proved useful for dramatically enhancing the sensitivity of cardiac biomarkers (e.g. Troponin) detection directly from serum for the diagnosis of acute myocardial infarction.

=== Nanowire assisted transfer of sensitive TEM samples ===
For a minimal introduction of stress and bending to transmission electron microscopy (TEM) samples (lamellae, thin films, and other mechanically and beam sensitive samples), when transferring inside a focused ion beam (FIB), flexible metallic nanowires can be attached to a typically rigid micromanipulator.

The main advantages of this method include a significant reduction of sample preparation time (quick welding and cutting of nanowire at low beam current), and minimization of stress-induced bending, Pt contamination, and ion beam damage. This technique is particularly suitable for in situ electron microscopy sample preparation.

== Corn-like nanowires ==
Corn-like nanowire is a one-dimensional nanowire with interconnected nanoparticles on the surface, providing a large percentage of reactive facets. TiO_{2} corn-like nanowires were first prepared by a surface modification concept using surface tension stress mechanism through a two consecutive hydrothermal operation, and showed an increase of 12% in dye-sensitized solar cell efficiency the light scattering layer. CdSe corn-like nanowires grown by chemical bath deposition and corn-like γ-Fe_{2}O_{3}@SiO_{2}@TiO_{2} photocatalysts induced by magnetic dipole interactions have been also reported previously.

== See also ==
- Bacterial nanowires
- Molecular wire
- Nanoantenna
- Nanorod
- Nanowire battery
- Non-carbon nanotube
- Silicon nanowire
- Solar cell
