= Wingreen =

Surname list

Wingreen is the surname of the following people

- Ivan Wingreen (1961–2014), South African cricketer
- Jason Wingreen (1920–2015), American actor
- Ned Wingreen, American theoretical physicist

== See also ==
- Meir-Wingreen Formula, describes electric current as mesoscopic system
