= Ballistic transistor =

Ballistic transistor may mean:

- Ballistic deflection transistor
- Ballistic collection transistor
- any transistor featuring ballistic conduction
