= Ballistic conduction in single-walled carbon nanotubes =

Single-walled carbon nanotubes in the fields of quantum mechanics and nanoelectronics, have the ability to conduct electricity. This conduction can be ballistic, diffusive, or based on scattering. When ballistic in nature conductance can be treated as if the electrons experience no scattering.

== Conductance quantization and Landauer formula ==
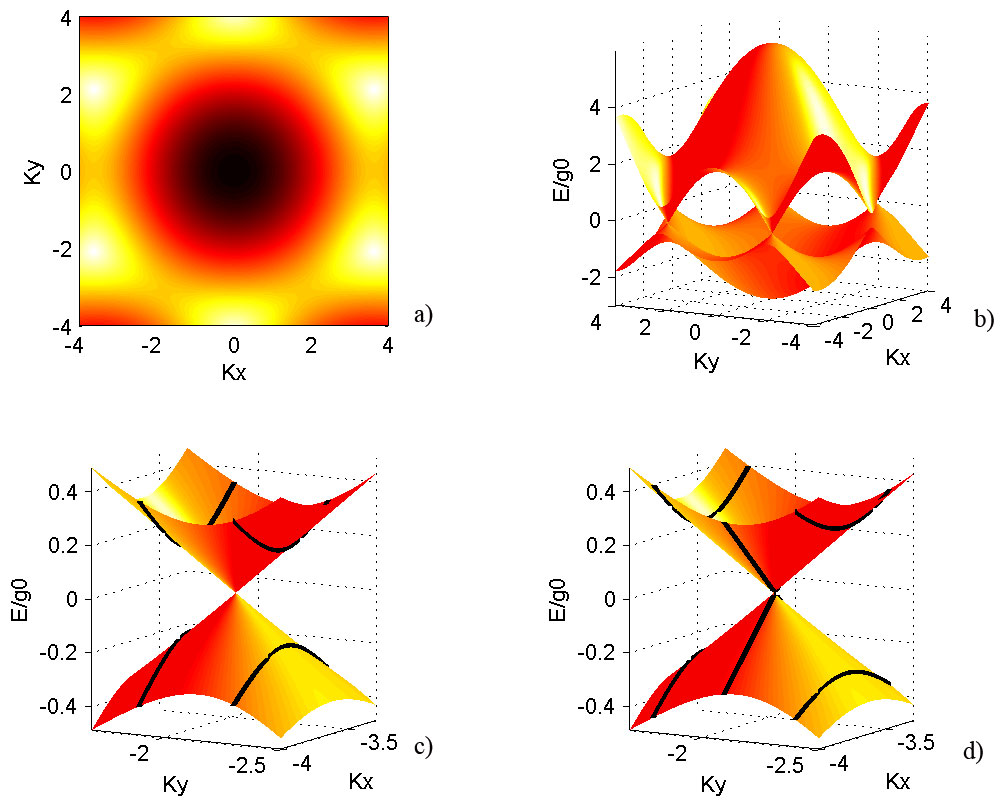
Figure 1: a) Energy contour plot of the electronic band structure in CNTs.; b) Linear dependence of the electron energy on the wave vector in CNTs; c) Dispersion relation near the Fermi energy for a semiconducting CNT; d) Dispersion relation near the Fermi energy for a metallic CNT

Conduction in single-walled carbon nanotubes is quantized due to their one-dimensionality and the number of allowed electronic states is limited, if compared to bulk graphite. The nanotubes behave consequently as quantum wires and charge carriers are transmitted through discrete conduction channels. This conduction mechanism can be either ballistic or diffusive in nature, or based on tunneling. When ballistically conducted, the electrons travel through the nanotubes channel without experiencing scattering due to impurities, local defects or lattice vibrations. As a result, the electrons encounter no resistance and no energy dissipation occurs in the conduction channel. In order to estimate the current in the carbon nanotube channel, the Landauer formula can be applied, which considers a one-dimensional channel, connected to two contacts – source and drain.

Assuming no scattering and ideal (transparent) contacts, the conductance of the one-dimensional system is given by G = G_{0}NT, where T is the probability that an electron will be transmitted along the channel, N is the number of the channels available for transport, and G_{0} is the conductance quantum 2e^{2}/h = (12.9kΩ)^{−1}. Perfect contacts, with reflection R = 0, and no back scattering along the channel result in transmission probability T = 1 and the conductance of the system becomes G = (2e^{2}/h) N. Thus each channel contributes 2G_{0} to the total conductance. For metallic armchair nanotubes, there are two subbands, which cross the Fermi level, and for semiconducting nanotubes – bands which don't cross the Fermi level. Thus there are two conducting channels and each band accommodates two electrons of opposite spin. Thus the value of the conductance is G = 2G_{0} = (6.45 kΩ)^{−1}.

In a non-ideal system, T in the Landauer formula is replaced by the sum of the transmission probabilities for each conduction channel. When the value of the conductance for the above example approaches the ideal value of 2G_{0}, the conduction along the channel is said to be ballistic. This happens when the scattering length in the nanotube is much greater than the distance between the contacts. If a carbon nanotube is a ballistic conductor, but the contacts are nontransparent, the transmission probability, T, is reduced by back-scattering in the contacts. If the contacts are perfect, the reduced T is due to back-scattering along the nanotube only. When the resistance measured at the contacts is high, one can infer the presence of Coulomb blockade and Luttinger liquid behavior for different temperatures. Low contact resistance is a prerequisite for investigating conduction phenomena in CNTs in the high transmission regime.

== Quantum Interference ==
When the size of the CNT device scales with the electron coherence length, important in the ballistic conduction regime in CNTs becomes the interference pattern arising when measuring the differential conductance $dI/dV$ as a function of the gate voltage. This pattern is due to the quantum interference of multiply reflected electrons in the CNT channel. Effectively, this corresponds to a Fabry-Perot resonator, where the nanotube acts as a coherent waveguide and the resonant cavity is formed between the two CNT-electrode interfaces. Phase coherent transport, electron interference, and localized states have been observed in the form of fluctuations in the conductance as a function of the Fermi energy.

Phase coherent electrons give rise to the observed interference effect at low temperatures. Coherence then corresponds to a decrease in the occupation numbers of phonon modes and a decreased rate of inelastic scattering. Correspondingly, increased conduction is reported for low temperatures.

== Ballistic Conduction in CNT Field-Effect Transistors ==
CNT FETs exhibit four regimes of charge transport:

- ohmic contact ballistic
- ohmic contact diffusive
- Schottky barrier ballistic
- Schottky barrier diffusive

Ohmic contacts ballistic require no scattering as the charge carriers are transported through the channel, i.e. the length of the CNT should be much smaller than the mean free path (L<< l_{m}). The opposite is valid for diffusive transport. In semiconducting CNTs at room temperature and for low energies, the mean free path is determined by the electron scattering from acoustic phonons, which results in l_{m} ≈ 0.5μm. In order to satisfy the conditions for ballistic transport, one has to take care of the channel length and the properties of the contacts, while the geometry of the device could be any top-gated doped CNT FET.

Ballistic transport in a CNT FET takes place when the length of the conducting channel is much smaller than the mean free path of the charge carrier, l_{m}.

=== Ballistic conduction in Ohmic Contact FETs ===
Ohmic i.e. transparent contacts are most favorable for an optimized current flow in a FET. In order to derive the current-voltage (I-V) characteristics for a ballistic CNT FET, one can start with Planck's postulate, which relates the energy of the i-th state to its frequency:
$E_i=h\nu_i=\frac{h}{2e}\frac{2e}{T_i}=\frac{h}{2e}I_i$

The total current for a many-state system is then the sum over the energy of each state multiplied by the occupation probability function, in this case the Fermi–Dirac statistics:

$I_i=\frac{2e}{h}\sum_{i}E_i\frac{1}{1+e^{\frac{E-E_f}{k_BT}}}$

For a system with dense states, the discrete sum can be approximated by an integral:

$I_i=\frac{2e}{h}\int \frac{1}{1+e^{\frac{E-E_f}{k_BT}}}dE$

In CNT FETs, the charge carriers move either left (negative velocity) or right (positive velocity) and the resulting net current is called drain current. The source potential controls the right-moving, and the drain potential - the left moving carriers and if the source potential is set to zero, the Fermi energy at the drain subsequently decreases to yield positive drain voltage. The total drain current is computed as a sum of all contributing subbands in the semiconductor CNT, but given the low voltages used with nanoscale electronics, higher subbands can be effectively ignored and the drain current is given only by the contribution of the first subband:

$I_d=I_0 \left \{ \ln\left [ 1+e^{2e\phi _s-\frac{E_g}{2kT}} \right ]-\ln\left [ 1+ e^{2e\phi _s-2eV_d -\frac{E_g}{2kT}}\right ] \right \}$ where $I_0=\frac{4e}{h}kT=\frac{kT}{eR_0}$
and $R_0$ is the quantum resistance.

The expression for $I_d$ gives the ballistic current dependence on the voltage in a CNT FET with ideal contacts.

=== Ballistic conduction with Optical Phonon Scattering ===
Ideally, ballistic transport in CNT FETs requires no scattering from optical or acoustic phonons, however the analytical model yields only partial agreement with experimental data. Thus, one needs to consider a mechanism, which would improve the agreement and recalibrate the definition of ballistic conduction in CNTs. Partially ballistic transport is modeled to involve optical phonon scattering. Scattering of electrons by optical phonons in carbon nanotube channels has two requirements:

- The traveled length in the conduction channel between source and drain has to be greater than the optical phonon mean free path
- The electron energy has to be greater than the critical optical phonon emission energy

=== Schottky barrier Ballistic conduction ===
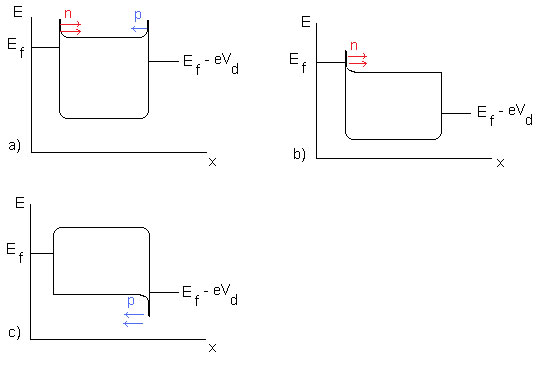
Figure 2: Example of the band structure of a ballistic CNT FET. a) The net current through the channel is the difference between the electrons tunneling from the source and holes tunneling from the drain.; b) ON-state: the current is produced by the source electrons; c) OFF-state: hole leakage current induced by drain holes.

CNT FETs with Schottky contacts are easier to fabricate than those with ohmic contacts. In these transistors, the gate voltage controls the thickness of the barrier, and the drain voltage can lower the barrier height at the drain electrode. Quantum tunneling of the electrons through the barrier should also be taken into account here. In order to understand the charge conduction in Schottky barrier CNT FETs, we need to study the band schemes under different bias conditions (Fig 2):

- the net current is a result of electrons tunneling from the source and holes tunneling from the drain
- ON-state: electrons tunneling from the source
- OFF-state: holes tunneling from the drain

Thus, the Schottky barrier CNT FET is effectively an ambipolar transistor, since the ON electron current is opposed by an OFF hole current, which flows at values smaller than the critical gate voltage value.

From the band diagrams, one can deduce the $I_d - V_g$ characteristics of the Schottky CNT FETs. Starting at the OFF state, there is hole current, which gradually decreases as the gate voltage is increased until it is opposed with equal strength by the electron current coming from the source. Above the critical gate voltage in the ON state, the electron current prevails and reaches a maximum at $V_g=V_d$ and the $I-V$ curve will roughly have a V-shape.
