= A. Brooks Harris =

American physicist

Arthur Brooks Harris, called Brooks Harris, (March 25, 1935) is an American physicist.

== Biography ==
Harris was born in Boston, Massachusetts, and studied at Harvard University with bachelor's degree in 1956, master's degree in 1959, and PhD in experimental solid state physics from Horst Meyer in 1962. Harris was in 1961/62 at Duke University to complete his doctoral thesis with Meyer and then was an instructor there from 1962 to 1964. During 1961–1964 at Duke University Harris retrained himself as a theorist in condensed matter physics and then spent the academic year 1964/65 as a researcher working with John Hubbard in the UK at the Atomic Energy Research Establishment (Harwell Laboratory) near Harwell, Oxfordshire. At the University of Pennsylvania, Harris became in 1965 an assistant professor and in 1977 a full professor, continuing there until his retirement as professor emeritus.

He was a visiting professor at University of British Columbia in 1976, at the University of Oxford in 1973, 1986, and 1994, at Tel Aviv University in 1987 and 1995, and at McMaster University in 2005. He was visiting scientist at Sandia National Laboratories in 1974 and at the National Institute of Standards and Technology (NIST) in 2002.

In 2007 he received the Lars Onsager Prize for his contributions to the statistical physics of disordered systems, especially for the development of the Harris criterion. From 1967 to 1969 he was Sloan Fellow and in 1972/73 a Guggenheim Fellow. In 1989 he was elected a Fellow of the American Physical Society.

Harris was married to Peggy for over 60 years and has three children, eight grandchildren, and three great-grandchildren.

His mother was Wilhelmina Harris

== Research ==
Upon receiving the Lars Onsager Prize, Harris wrote in 2007:

My interests have included orientational ordering in solid molecular hydrogen (some with H. Meyer), critical properties of numerous random systems (often in collaboration with T. C. Lubensky), the crystal structure and dynamics of fullerenes (often with T. Yildirim), spin dynamics of frustrated magnets (with A. J. Berlinsky and more recently with A. Aharony, O. Entin-Wohlman, and T. Yildirim) and the symmetry properties of frustrated magnets which exhibit simultaneous magnetic and ferroelectric ordering.

He has also collaborated in theoretical condensed matter physics with R. J. Birgeneau (MIT), J. Yeomans (Oxford), R. D. Kamien (Penn), C. Broholm (Johns Hopkins), and A. Ramirez (Bell Labs).

In 1973 he developed at Oxford the Harris criterion, which indicates the extent to which the critical exponents of a phase transition are modified by a small amount of randomness (e.g., defects, dislocations, or impurities). Such impurities "smear" the phase transition and lead to local variations in the transition temperature. Let $d$ denote the spatial dimension of the system and let $\nu$ denote the critical exponent of correlation length. The Harris criterion states that if

$$\nu \geq \frac {2} {d}$$

the impurities do not affect the critical behavior (so that the critical behavior is then stable against the random interference). For example, in the classical three-dimensional Heisenberg model $\nu = 0 {.} 698$ and thus the Harris criterion is satisfied, while the three-dimensional Ising model has $\nu = 0 {. } 627$ and thus does not satisfy the criterion ($d = 3$).

== Selected publications ==
- "Effect of Random Defects on the Critical Behaviour of Ising Models,” A. Brooks Harris, J. Phys. C 7, 1671–1692 (1974). doi:10.1088/0022-3719/7/9/009
- “Single-Particle Excitations in Narrow Energy Bands,” A. Brooks Harris and Robert V. Lange, Phys. Rev. 157, 295–314 (1967). doi:10.1103/PhysRev.157.295
- “Renormalization-Group Approach to the Critical Behavior of Random-Spin Models,” A. Brooks Harris and T. C. Lubensky, Phys. Rev. Lett. 33, 1540–1543 (1974). doi:10.1103/PhysRevLett.33.1540
- “Comment on “Orientational Ordering Transition in Solid C_{60}”," Ravi Sachidanandam and A. B. Harris, Phys. Rev. Lett. 67, 1467–1467 (1991). doi:10.1103/PhysRevLett.67.1467
- “Possible Néel Orderings of the Kagomé Antiferromagnet,” A. B. Harris, C. Kallin, and A. J. Berlinsky, Phys. Rev. B 45, 2899–2919 (1992). doi:10.1103/PhysRevB.45.2899
- “Mean Field Theory of the Orientational Properties of (J = 1) Molecules on the Surface of Grafoil,” A. B. Harris and A. J. Berlinsky, Can. J. Phys. 7, 1852–1868 (1979). doi:10.1139/p79-256
- “Molecular Chirality and Chiral Parameters,” A. B. Harris, R. D. Kamien, and T. C. Lubensky, Rev. Mod. Phys. 71, 1745–1757 (1999). doi:10.1103/RevModPhys.71.1745
- “Magnetically Driven Ferroelectric Order in Ni_{3}V_{2}O_{8},” G. Lawes, A. B. Harris, T. Kimura, N. Rogado, R. J. Cava, A. Aharony, O. Entin-Wohlman, T. Yildirim, M. Kenzelmann, C. Broholm, and A. P. Ramirez, Phys. Rev. Lett. 95, 087205 (2005). doi:10.1103/PhysRevLett.95.087205
- “Anisotropic Spin Hamiltonians due to Spin-Orbit and Coulomb Exchange Interactions,” T. Yildirim, A. B. Harris, Amnon Aharony, and O. Entin-Wohlman, Phys. Rev. B 52, 10239–10267 (1995). doi:10.1103/PhysRevB.52.10239
- “Observation of the Pair Interaction Between Ortho Molecules in Solid H_{2},” A. Brooks Harris, Larry I. Amstutz, Horst Meyer, and Samuel M. Myers, Phys. Rev. 175, 603–609 (1968). doi:10.1103/PhysRev.175.603
