= Entin =

Entin is a surname. Notable people with the surname include:

- Edmund Entin (born 1985), American actor
- Ora Entin-Wohlman (born 1943), Israeli physicist
- Yuri Entin (born 1935), Soviet Russian poet, playwright, and lyricist

== See also ==
- Enting
