= Break junction =

Electronic device consisting of two wires

A break junction is an electronic device which consists of two metal wires separated by a very thin gap, on the order of the inter-atomic spacing (less than a nanometer). This can be done by physically pulling the wires apart or through chemical etching or electromigration. As the wire breaks, the separation between the electrodes can be indirectly controlled by monitoring the electrical resistance of the junction.

After the gap is formed, its width can often be controlled by bending the substrate that the metal contacts lie on. The gap can be controlled to a precision of picometers.

A typical conductance versus time trace during the breaking process (conductance is simply current divided by applied voltage bias) shows two regimes. First is a regime where the break junction comprises a quantum point contact. In this regime conductance decreases in steps equal to the conductance quantum $G_Q=2e^2/h$, which is expressed through the electron charge (−e) and the Planck constant $h$. The conductance quantum has a value of 7.74×10^{−5} siemens, corresponding to a resistance increase of roughly 12.9 kΩ. These step decreases are interpreted as the result of a decrease, as the electrodes are pulled apart, in the number of single-atom-wide metal strands bridging between the two electrodes, each strand having a conductance equal to the quantum of conductance. As the wire is pulled, the neck becomes thinner with fewer atomic strands in it. Each time the neck reconfigures, which happens abruptly, a step-like decrease of the conductance can be observed. This picture inferred from the current measurement has been confirmed by "in-situ" TEM imaging of the breaking process combined with current measurement.

In a second regime, when the wire is pulled further apart, the conductance collapses to values less than the quantum of conductance. This is known as the tunneling regime where electrons tunnel through vacuums between the electrodes.

== Use ==
Break junctions are used to make electrical contacts to study single molecules.
