= Beam deflection tube =

Vacuum tube with an electron beam deflectable to one of two anodes

E1T Beam deflection tube in action, showing the figures 0 through 9

Beam deflection tubes, sometimes known as sheet beam tubes, are vacuum tubes with an electron gun, a beam intensity control grid, a screen grid, sometimes a suppressor grid, and two electrostatic deflection electrodes on opposite sides of the electron beam that can direct the rectangular beam to either of two anodes in the same plane.

They can be used as two-quadrant, single-balanced mixers or (de)modulators with very linear qualities. Their mode of operation is similar to one-half of a Gilbert cell by applying an unbalanced signal f_{1} to the control grid and a balanced signal f_{2} to the deflection electrodes, then extracting the balanced mixing products f_{1} − f_{2} and f_{1} + f_{2} from the two anodes. Similar to a pentagrid converter, the cathode and the first two grids can be made into an oscillator. Two beam deflection tubes can be combined to form a double-balanced mixer.

They need extensive shielding against external magnetic fields. The ballistic deflection transistors currently under development employ a similar principle.

== Examples ==
Basic circuit using a beam deflection tube

- 6218/E80T - Modulated beam deflection tube, for pulse generation up to 375 MHz; single-anode version, shock-proof up to 500 g
- 7360 - Balanced modulator or product detector up to 100 MHz
- 6AR8, 6JH8, 6ME8 - Analog television chroma signal demodulators used in color TV receivers

More elaborate applications of the principle include:

- 2H21 and 5593 - Magnetically controlled "Phasitron" phase modulator tubes used in early FM broadcast transmitters.
- 6090 - 18-channel analog demultiplexer for telecomms receiving channel banks, an electrostatic deflection field determines which one out of 18 anodes receives the electron beam controlled by a common grid
- 6170 and 6324 - 25-channel analog multiplexer for telecomms transmitting channel banks, a rotating magnetic deflection field determines through which one out of 25 grids the electron beam passes to the common anode
- 6462 Magnetic pickup tube, a 1-axis magnetometer with approx. 1 G (100 μT) resolution; the electron beam is electrostatically centered between two anodes while no magnetic field is present; the magnetic field to be detected will then deflect the beam more towards one of the anodes, resulting in an imbalance between the two anode currents
- E1T - Trochotron with a fluorescent-screen readout
- QK329 - Square-law tube for use as a function generator in analog computers. A flat sheet beam is deflected across the anode which is partially covered by a parabolically stenciled screen "grid" that acts as the tube's output.
- Parallel-output PCM tube, an analog-to-digital converter with per-bit, vertical anode bars with perforations encoding the Gray code. A flat, horizontal sheet beam was then vertically deflected by the input analog signal across the perforated anode array, causing the digital representation of the analog signal to appear on the anodes.

With two-axis deflection:

- Serial-output PCM tube, an analog-to-digital converter with one anode having binary-encoding perforations. As in an oscilloscope, the beam was swept horizontally by a sawtooth wave at the sample rate while the vertical deflection was controlled by the input analog signal, causing the beam to pass through higher or lower portions of the perforated anode. The anode collected or passed the beam, producing current variations in binary code, one bit at a time.
- CK1414 Character generator monoscope for text mode video rendering in early computer monitors, with a square target having letters, digits and symbols patterned on it in a customer-supplied 8x8 or 8x12 array. An electron beam selects and scans a character, both by appropriate deflection, and generates an analog video signal.
- 7828 Scan conversion tube, an analog video standards transcoder consisting of a CRT/camera tube combination. The CRT part does not write onto a phosphor, but onto a thin, dielectric target; the camera part reads the deposited charge pattern at a different scan rate from the back side of this target. The setup could also be used as a genlock.

== See also ==
- Selectron tube
- Storage tube
- Williams tube
