= Velocity overshoot =

Velocity overshoot is a physical effect resulting in transit times for charge carriers between terminals that are smaller than the time required for emission of an optical phonon. The velocity therefore exceeds the saturation velocity up to three times, which leads to faster field-effect transistor or bipolar transistor switching. The effect is noticeable in the ordinary field-effect transistor for the gates shorter than 100 nm.

== Ballistic collection transistor ==
The device intentionally designed to benefit from the velocity overshoot is called ballistic collection transistor (not to be mistaken with the ballistic deflection transistor).

== See also ==
- Ballistic conduction
