= Quantum wire =

Electrical wire where quantum effects influence transport properties

In mesoscopic physics, a quantum wire is an electrically conducting wire in which quantum effects influence the transport properties. Usually such effects appear in the dimension of nanometers, so they are also referred to as nanowires.

== Quantum effects ==
If the diameter of a wire is sufficiently small, electrons will experience quantum confinement in the transverse direction. As a result, their transverse energy will be limited to a series of discrete values. One consequence of this quantization is that the classical formula for calculating the electrical resistance of a wire,

$$R = \rho \frac{l}{A},$$

is not valid for quantum wires (where $\rho$ is the material's resistivity, $l$ is the length, and $A$ is the cross-sectional area of the wire).

Instead, an exact calculation of the transverse energies of the confined electrons has to be performed to calculate a wire's resistance. Following from the quantization of electron energy, the electrical conductance (the inverse of the resistance) is found to be quantized in multiples of $2e^2/h$, where $e$ is the electron charge and $h$ is the Planck constant. The factor of two arises from spin degeneracy. A single ballistic quantum channel (i.e. with no internal scattering) has a conductance equal to this quantum of conductance. The conductance is lower than this value in the presence of internal scattering.

The importance of the quantization is inversely proportional to the diameter of the nanowire for a given material. From material to material, it is dependent on the electronic properties, especially on the effective mass of the electrons. Physically, this means that it will depend on how conduction electrons interact with the atoms within a given material. In practice, semiconductors can show clear conductance quantization for large wire transverse dimensions (~100 nm) because the electronic modes due to confinement are spatially extended. As a result, their Fermi wavelengths are large and thus they have low energy separations. This means that they can only be resolved at cryogenic temperatures (within a few degrees of absolute zero) where the thermal energy is lower than the inter-mode energy separation.

For metals, quantization corresponding to the lowest energy states is only observed for atomic wires. Their corresponding wavelength being thus extremely small they have a very large energy separation which makes resistance quantization observable even at room temperature.

== Carbon nanotubes ==
Band structures computed using tight binding approximation for (6,0) CNT (zigzag, metallic), (10,2) CNT (semiconducting) and (10,10) CNT (armchair, metallic)

The carbon nanotube is an example of a quantum wire. A metallic single-walled carbon nanotube that is sufficiently short to exhibit no internal scattering (ballistic transport) has a conductance that approaches two times the conductance quantum, $2e^2/h$. The factor of two arises because carbon nanotubes have two spatial channels.

The structure of a nanotube strongly affects its electrical properties. For a given (n,m) nanotube, if n = m, the nanotube is metallic; if n − m is a multiple of 3, then the nanotube is semiconducting with a very small band gap, otherwise the nanotube is a moderate semiconductor. Thus all armchair (n = m) nanotubes are metallic, and nanotubes (6,4), (9,1), etc. are semiconducting.

== See also ==
- Conductance quantum
- Quantum dot
- Quantum point contact
- Quantum well
