= David Esseni =

Italian engineer

David Esseni from the University of Udine, Udine, Italy was named Fellow of the Institute of Electrical and Electronics Engineers (IEEE) in 2013 for contributions to characterization and modeling of mobility and quasi-ballistic transport in MOS transistors.
