= Yigal Meir =

Israeli physicist

- יגאל מאיר
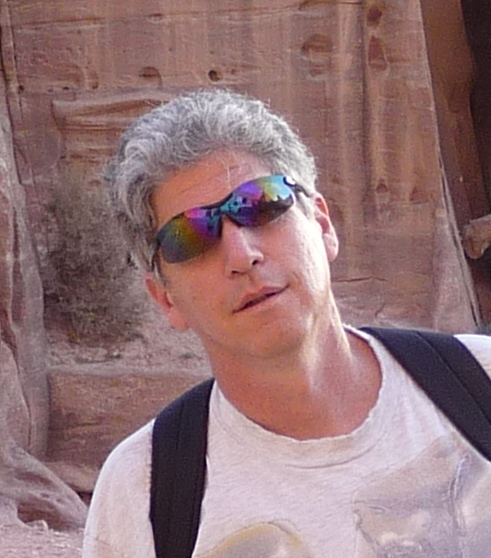
- Born: November 20, 1957 (age 68); Haifa, Israel
- Education: Tel Aviv University
- Known for: Meir–Wingreen formula 0.7 anomaly
- Scientific career
- Fields: Condensed matter theory, Biophysics
- Doctoral advisor: Amnon Aharony, Yoseph Imry
- Other academic advisors: Patrick Lee, Walter Kohn

Yigal Meir (Hebrew: יגאל מאיר; 20 November 1957) is the Graham Beck professor of Quantum Science and Technology at Ben Gurion University, specializing in condensed matter; in particular mesoscopic physics, disordered systems and strongly correlated materials. Among his achievements is the derivation of the Meir–Wingreen formula, and solving the 0.7 anomaly puzzle in quantum point contacts.

== Career ==
Meir was educated in Tel Aviv University, where he obtained a PhD in theoretical condensed matter physics under the supervision of Amnon Aharony and Yoseph Imry. He held postdoctoral positions at MIT (1989–91), with Patrick Lee, and at the University of California at Santa Barbara (1991–94), with Walter Kohn. In 1994 he joined the physics department at Ben Gurion University, Beersheba, Israel as a faculty member. He holds a visiting position at Princeton University.

Meir has published more than 120 papers in refereed journals. Early in his career, he concentrated on transport through quantum dots, explaining the Coulomb oscillations in the measured electric current. In the process he derived the Meir-Wingreen formula for the electric current through interaction system, a now textbook formula. Later on he made numerous contributions to the field of transport in disordered systems, in particular to the issue of phase transitions in such media, such as the metal-insulator transition in two-dimensions and the Superconductor Insulator Transition in thin films, and to the field of strong correlation effects in mesoscopic devices, in the particular the manifestation of the Kondo effect. In the latter context he suggested a solution for the long standing puzzle of the 0.7 anomaly – the observation of a step in the conductance of quantum point contacts, around the value of 0.7 2e^{2}/h (where e is the electron charge and h the Planck constant), in addition to the expected integer steps. This explanation is based on an emergence of a quasi-localized state in the quantum point contact, associated with slow electrons above the point contact barrier, an observation that has been verified experimentally. In recent years he has extended his research to the field of biology, together with his colleague Ned Wingreen from Princeton University.

Meir has been a fellow of the American Physical Society since 2003. In 2008 he won the Ben Gurion University President Award for Outstanding Scientific Achievement, during the celebrations for the 60th anniversary of the independence of the State of Israel. He served as the president of the Israeli Physical Society from 2011 to 2014.
