= Landauer formula =

Conductance formula in terms of the conductance quantum and transmission possibilities

In mesoscopic physics, the Landauer formula—named after Rolf Landauer, who first suggested its prototype in 1957—is a formula relating the electrical resistance of a quantum conductor to the scattering properties of the conductor. It is the equivalent of Ohm's law for mesoscopic circuits with spatial dimensions in the order of or smaller than the phase coherence length of charge carriers (electrons and holes). In metals, the phase coherence length is of the order of the micrometre for temperatures less than 1 K.

== Description ==
In the simplest case where the system only has two terminals with a small difference in chemical potential, and the scattering matrix of the conductor does not depend on energy, the formula reads

$$G(\mu) = G_0 \sum_n T_n (\mu) \ ,$$

where $G$ is the electrical conductance, $G_0 = e^2/(\pi\hbar) \approx 7.75\times 10^{-5} \Omega^{-1}$ is the conductance quantum, $T_n$ are the transmission eigenvalues of the channels, and the sum runs over all transport channels in the conductor. This formula is very simple and physically sensible: The conductance of a nanoscale conductor is given by the sum of all the transmission possibilities that an electron has when propagating with an energy equal to the average chemical potential of the left and right leads, $E=\mu = \tfrac12(\mu_{\mathrm L} + \mu_{\mathrm R})$.

== Multiple terminals ==
A generalization of the Landauer formula for multiple terminals is the Landauer–Büttiker formula, proposed by Markus Büttiker. If terminal $j$ has voltage $V_j$ (that is, its chemical potential is $eV_j$ and differs from terminal $i$ chemical potential), and $T_{i,j}$ is the sum of transmission probabilities from terminal $i$ to terminal $j$ (note that $T_{i,j}$ may or may not equal $T_{j,i}$ depending on the presence of a magnetic field), the net current leaving terminal $i$ is

$$I_i = \frac{e^2}{2 \pi \hbar} \sum_{j } \left(  T_{j,i} V_i - T_{i,j} V_j \right)$$

In the case of a system with two terminals, the contact resistivity symmetry yields

$$\sum_{i \neq j} T_{ij} = \sum_{i \neq j} T_{ji}$$

and the generalized formula can be rewritten as

$$I_i = \frac{ e^2 }{2 \pi \hbar } \sum_{i\neq j} T_{ji} (V_i - V_j )$$

which leads us to

$$I_1 = \frac{  e^2}{2\pi \hbar} T_{12}(V_1 - V_2) = -I_2 =-\frac{e^2 }{2 \pi \hbar} T_{21}(V_2 - V_1)$$

which implies that the scattering matrix of a system with two terminals is always symmetrical, even with the presence of a magnetic field. The reversal of the magnetic field will only change the propagation direction of the edge states, without affecting the transmission probability.

=== Example ===
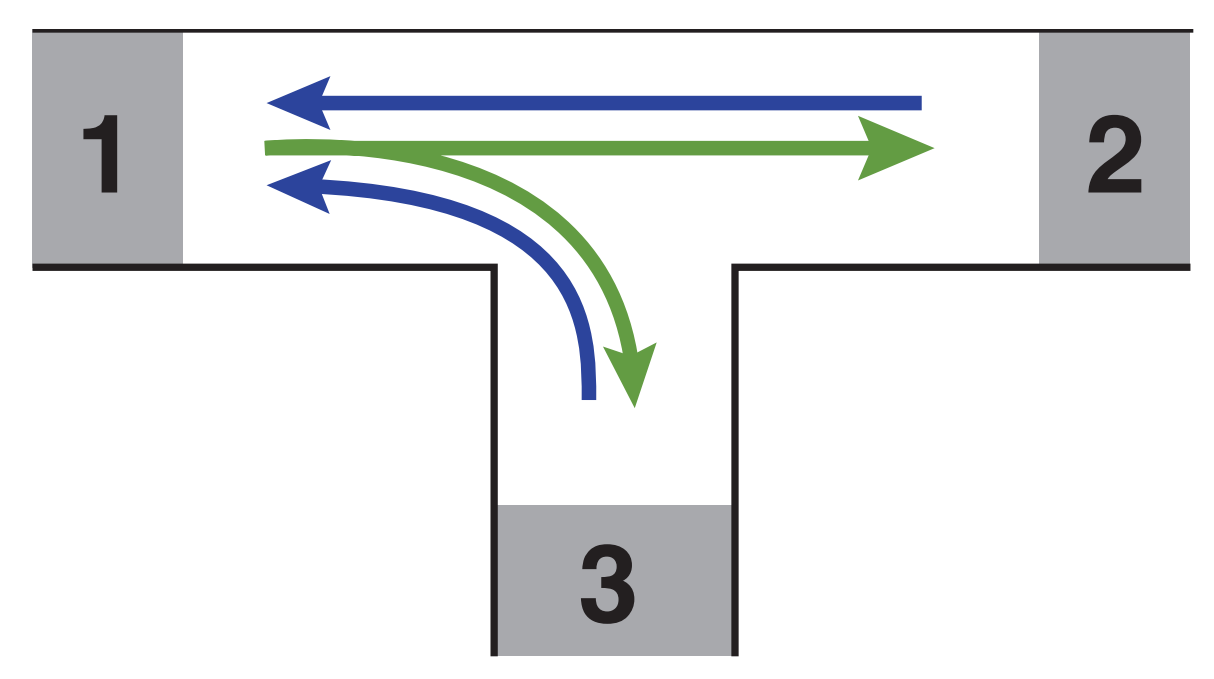
Three contact system for electron transport

As an example, in a three contact system, the net current leaving the contact 1 can be written as

$$I_1 =   (T_{21} + T_{31} )V_1 - T_{12} V_2 - T_{13} V_3$$

Which is the carriers leaving contact 1 with a potential $V_1$ from which we subtract the carriers from contacts 2 and 3 with potentials $V_2$ and $V_3$ respectively, going into contact 1.

In the absence of an applied magnetic field, the generalized equation would be the result of applying Kirchhoff's law to a system of conductance $G_{ij}= ( e^2 )/(2\pi \hbar)T_{ij}$. However, in the presence of a magnetic field, the time reversal symmetry would be broken and therefore, $T_{ij} \neq T_{ji}$.

In the presence of more than two terminals in the system, the two terminals symmetry is broken. In the earlier given example, $T_{21} \neq T_{32} + T_{13}$. This is due to the fact that the terminals "recycle" the incoming electrons, for which the phase coherence is lost when another electron is emitted towards terminal 1. However, since the carriers are moving through edge states, one can see that $T_{21}^{B} = T_{12}^{-B}$ even with the presence of a third terminal. This is due to the fact that under magnetic field inversion, the edge states simply change their propagation orientation. This is especially true if terminal 3 is taken as a perfect potential probe.

== See also ==
- Ballistic conduction
- Meir–Wingreen formula
- Shot noise
- Near-field radiative heat transfer
