= Joan Adler =

Australian physicist

Joan Adler FInstP
- ג'ואן אדלר
- Born: 13 June 1950 (age 76); Sydney, Australia
- Citizenship: Australia, Israel
- Education: The University of Sydney; UNSW Sydney
- Known for: Percolation theory, lattice models, and neural networks
- Scientific career
- Fields: Computational physics
- Institutions: Technion – Israel Institute of Technology
- Theses: Percolation processes (Hons. 1974); Studies of higher order exchange in theoretical magnetism (PhD 1979)
- Website: rbni.technion.ac.il/node/190

Joan Elisabeth Adler (Hebrew: ג'ואן אדלר; born 1950) is a computational physicist at the Technion – Israel Institute of Technology. Originally from Australia, she is a citizen of both Australia and Israel. Her research involves percolation theory, lattice models, and neural networks.

== Early life and education ==
Adler was born on 13 June 1950 in Sydney, Australia. She graduated with a B.Sc. in mathematics and physics from the University of Sydney in 1974. She completed her doctorate in physics in 1980, at the University of New South Wales.

== Career ==
She worked at the Technion from 1980 to 1984 as a postdoctoral fellow and research associate, returned as a senior research associate in 1988, and became a senior research fellow in 2000. She was president of the Israel Physical Society from 2005–2007.

At Russell Berrie Nanotechnology Institute Technion–Israel Institute of Technology in Haifa, her recent research has included atomistic and electronic simulation and visualization for condensed matter and materials (including nanotubes), computational physics education, and statistical physics. She has also studied 3D stereo visualization for physics education and interopability of multiscale simulations.

In 2005, Adler became a Fellow of the Institute of Physics (Great Britain).

== Distinctions ==
- 1970–1973: Commonwealth Undergraduate Scholarship
- 1975–1978: Australian Postgraduate Research Award
- 1980–1983: Lady Davis Postdoctoral Fellowship
- 1987: PICS French-Israeli Travel Award

== Select publications ==
- Adler, Joan, Yigal Meir, Amnon Aharony, and A. Brooks Harris. "Series study of percolation moments in general dimension." Physical Review B 41, no. 13 (1990): 9183.
- Adler, Joan. "Bootstrap percolation." Physica A: Statistical Mechanics and its Applications 171, no. 3 (1991): 453-470.
- Hashibon, Adham, Joan Adler, Michael W. Finnis, and Wayne D. Kaplan. "Atomistic study of structural correlations at a liquid-solid interface." Computational materials science 24, no. 4 (2002): 443-452.
- Adler, Joan, and Uri Lev. "Bootstrap percolation: visualizations and applications." Brazilian Journal of Physics 33 (2003): 641-644.
