= Saturation velocity =

Charge carrier velocity

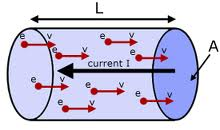
Diagram showing Drift Velocity

Saturation velocity is the maximum velocity a charge carrier in a semiconductor, generally an electron, attains in the presence of very high electric fields. When this happens, the semiconductor is said to be in a state of velocity saturation. Charge carriers normally move at an average drift speed proportional to the electric field strength they experience temporally. The proportionality constant is known as mobility of the carrier, which is a material property. A good conductor would have a high mobility value for its charge carrier, which means higher velocity, and consequently higher current values for a given electric field strength. There is a limit though to this process and at some high field value, a charge carrier can not move any faster, having reached its saturation velocity, due to mechanisms that eventually limit the movement of the carriers in the material.

As the applied electric field increases from that point, the carrier velocity no longer increases because the carriers lose energy through increased levels of interaction with the lattice, by emitting phonons and even photons as soon as the carrier energy is large enough to do so.

== Field effect transistors ==
Saturation velocity is a very important parameter in the design of semiconductor devices, especially field effect transistors, which are basic building blocks of almost all modern integrated circuits. Typical values of saturation velocity may vary greatly for different materials, for example for Si it is in the order of 1×10^{7} cm/s, for GaAs 1.2×10^{7} cm/s, while for 6H-SiC, it is near 2×10^{7} cm/s. Typical electric field strengths at which carrier velocity saturates is usually on the order of 10-100 kV/cm. Both saturation field and the saturation velocity of a semiconductor material are typically strong function of impurities, crystal defects and temperature.

== Small scale devices ==
For extremely small scale devices, where the high-field regions may be comparable or smaller than the average mean free path of the charge carrier, one can observe velocity overshoot, or hot electron effects which has become more important as the transistor geometries continually decrease to enable design of faster, larger and more dense integrated circuits. The regime where the two terminals between which the electron moves is much smaller than the mean free path, is sometimes referred as ballistic transport. There are numerous attempts to build transistors based on this principle. Nevertheless, developing field of nanotechnology, and new materials such as Carbon nanotubes and graphene, offers new hope.

== Negative differential resistance ==
Though in a semiconductor such as Si saturation velocity of a carrier is same as the peak velocity of the carrier, for some other materials with more complex energy band structures, this is not true. In GaAs or InP for example the carrier drift velocity reaches to a maximum as a function of field and then it begins to actually decrease as the electric field applied is increased further. Carriers which have gained enough energy are kicked up to a different conduction band which presents a lower drift velocity and eventually a lower saturation velocity in these materials. This results in an overall decrease of current for higher voltage until all electrons are in the "slow" band and this is the principle behind operation of a Gunn diode, which can display negative differential resistance. Due to the transfer of electrons to a different conduction band involved, such devices, usually single terminal, are referred to as Transferred electron devices, or TEDs.

== Design considerations ==
When designing semiconductor devices, especially on a sub-micrometre scale as used in modern microprocessors, velocity saturation is an important design characteristic. Velocity saturation greatly affects the voltage transfer characteristics of a field-effect transistor, which is the basic device used in most integrated circuits. If a semiconductor device enters velocity saturation, an increase in voltage applied to the device will not cause a linear increase in current as would be expected by Ohm's law. Instead, the current may only increase by a small amount, or not at all. It is possible to take advantage of this result when trying to design a device that will pass a constant current regardless of the voltage applied, a current limiter in effect.
