= Meir–Wingreen formula =

Equation in quantum transport

The Meir–Wingreen formula or Weir–Wingreen–Jauho formula describes the electric current through an arbitrary mesoscopic system. It was formulated by Yigal Meir and Ned Wingreen, and later extended along with Antti-Pekka Jauho. It describes the current using non-equilibrium Green's functions and Keldysh formalism.

When the interaction between electrons is neglected, this formula reduces to the Landauer formula. This textbook formula has become a standard tool for calculating the current through various systems, such as molecular junctions, quantum dots and nanoscale devices.

== Formula ==
It reads

$J=\frac{i e}{\hbar}\int \mathrm d \epsilon \mathrm{Tr}\left[(\Gamma^{\mathrm L}-\Gamma^{\mathrm R})G^{\mathrm K} -(\Gamma^{\mathrm L}f_{\mathrm L}-\Gamma^{\mathrm R} f_{\mathrm R})(G^{\mathrm r}-G^{\mathrm a})\right]$

where $e$ is the elementary charge, $\Gamma^b (b\in\{\mathrm{L,R}\})$ are the coupling matrices of the left (L) and right (R) leads, $G^{\mathrm K}$ is the Keldysh Green's function, $G^{\mathrm r}$ the retarded Green's function, $G^{\mathrm a}$ the advanced Green's function, and $f_{b}$ the Fermi–Dirac distribution of lead b.
