= Ned Wingreen =

American theoretical physicist

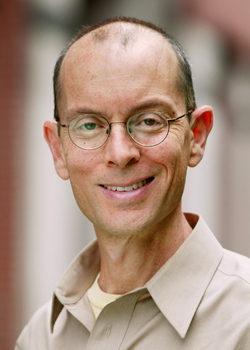
- Born: Ned S. Wingreen
- Education: California Institute of Technology; Cornell University
- Known for: Meir-Wingreen Formula
- Father: Jason Wingreen
- Scientific career
- Workplaces: NEC; Princeton University
- Doctoral advisor: John W. Wilkins

Ned S. Wingreen is a theoretical physicist and the Howard A. Prior Professor of the Life Sciences at Princeton University. He is a member of the Department of Molecular Biology and of the Lewis-Sigler Institute for Integrative Genomics, where he is currently director of graduate studies. He is the associate director of the Princeton Center for Theoretical Science, and is also associated faculty in the department of physics. Working with Yigal Meir, Wingreen formulated the Meir-Wingreen Formula which describes the electric current through an arbitrary mesoscopic system.

== Education and career ==
Wingreen received a B.S. in physics from California Institute of Technology in 1984. Wingreen then received his Ph.D. in theoretical condensed matter physics from Cornell University in 1989 as a Hertz Fellow. His dissertation was titled "Resonant Tunneling with Electron-Phonon Interaction" and he was advised by John W. Wilkins. He did his postdoc in mesoscopic physics at MIT. There, along with Yigal Meir, he formulated the Meir-Wingreen Formula that describes the electric current through an arbitrary mesoscopic system.

In 1991 he moved to the NEC Research Institute in Princeton. At NEC, he continued to work in mesoscopic physics, but also started research in biophysics which grew into a general interest in problems at the interface of physics and biology. Wingreen joined Princeton University in 2004. Wingreen's current research focuses on modelling intracellular networks in bacteria and other microorganisms, as well as studies of microbial communities. He is a fellow of the American Physical Society and the American Association for the Advancement of Science.

== Honors ==
- Presidential Scholar (1980)
- Carnation Merit Scholarship (1982–1983)
- Caltech Merit Scholarship (1983–1984)
- Jack E. Froehlich Memorial Award (1983)
- McKinney Prize in Literature (1984)
- Fellow of the American Physical Society, (2001) "for contributions to the fundamental understanding of protein folding and design, including theoretical insights into the selection of protein structures"
- President's Award for Distinguished Teaching, Princeton University (2019)
- Tel Aviv University International Prize in Biophysics (2026)
