= Amnon Aharony =

Physicist at Ben Gurion University in Israel

- אמנון אהרוני
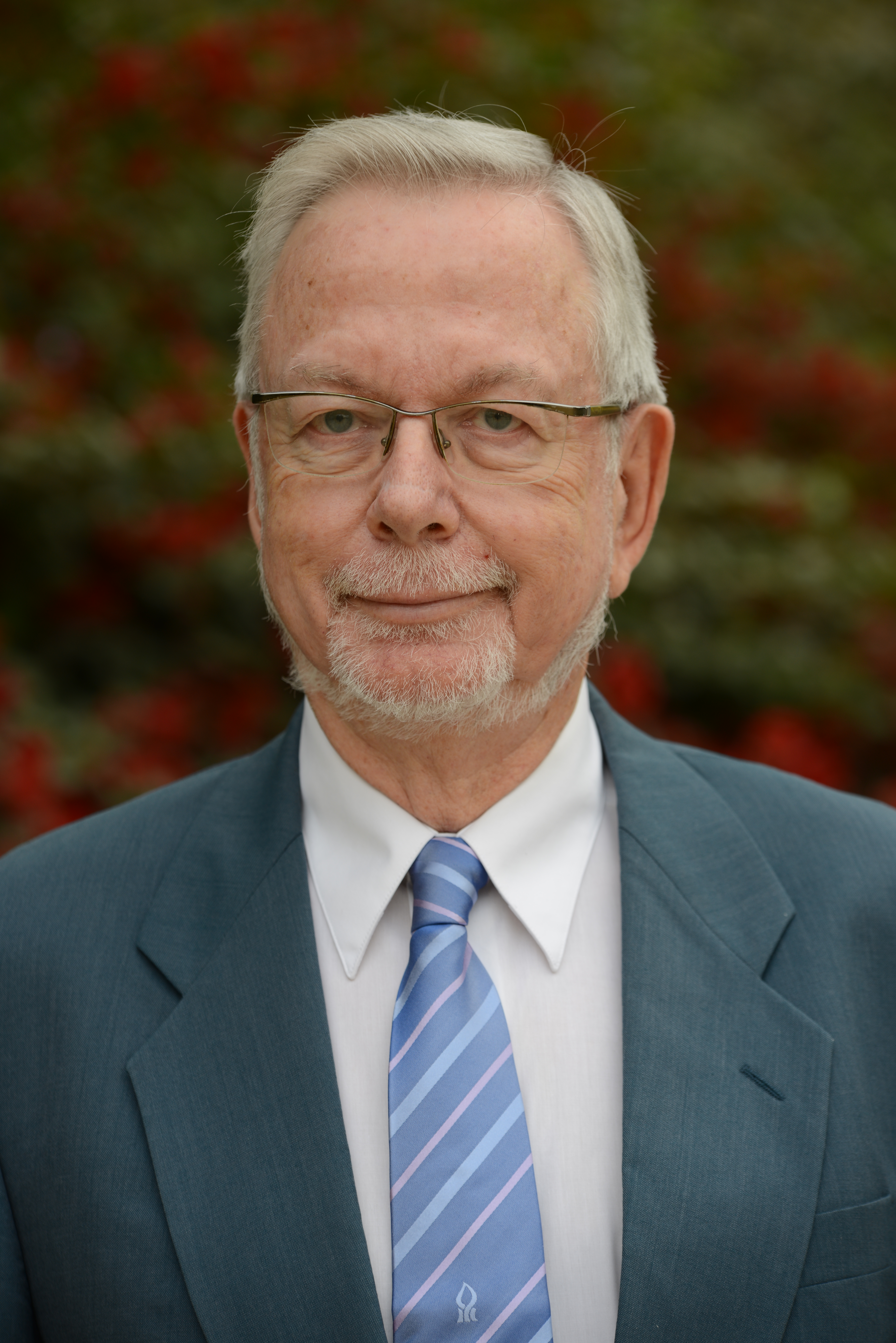
- Born: 7 January 1943 (age 83); Jerusalem, Israel
- Education: Tel Aviv University, Hebrew University of Jerusalem
- Children: 3
- Awards: Rothschild Prize, Randers prize American Physical Society fellow, Foreign Honorary Member of the American Academy of Arts and Sciences, Member of the Israel Academy of Sciences and Humanities
- Scientific career
- Fields: statistical physics condensed matter theory
- Workplaces: Tel Aviv University, Ben Gurion University of the Negev, University of Oslo
- Thesis: Aspects of time reversal symmetry violation (1972)
- Doctoral advisor: Yuval Ne'eman

Amnon Aharony (Hebrew: אמנון אהרוני; born 7 January 1943) is an Israeli Professor (Emeritus) of Physics in the School of Physics and Astronomy at Tel Aviv University, Israel and in the Physics Department of Ben Gurion University of the Negev, Israel. After years of research on statistical physics (critical phenomena, random systems, fractals, percolation), his current research focuses on condensed matter theory, especially in mesoscopic physics and spintronics. He is a member of the Israel Academy of Sciences and Humanities, a Foreign Honorary Member of the American Academy of Arts and Sciences and of several other academies. He also received several prizes, including the Rothschild Prize in Physical Sciences, and the Gunnar Randers Research Prize, awarded every other year by the King of Norway.

== Early life and education ==
Amnon Aharony was born in Jerusalem, and grew up in Netanya, Israel. He received his B.Sc. in Physics and Mathematics in 1964 from the Hebrew University of Jerusalem. His M.Sc. thesis, under the supervision of Gideon Rakavy, was on the distorted wave Born approximation for direct nuclear reactions (1965), from the same university. He received his doctorate in 1972 from Tel Aviv University, under the supervision of Yuval Ne'eman. Thesis title: Aspects of time reversal symmetry violation.

== Career ==
Aharony was a senior researcher in the Israel Army and Ministry of Defense during 1965–1972. In those years he was also a teaching instructor in Tel Aviv University. Aharony was a postdoctoral student at Cornell University with Michael Fisher, and also at Harvard University, the University of California, San Diego and at Bell Laboratories in Murray Hill.

He returned to Israel in 1975 to become an associate professor of physics in Tel Aviv University, and a full professor in 1979. From 1990 he held the Moyses Nussenzveig Chair in Statistical Physics. Aharony retired from the university as Professor Emeritus in 2006. At that year he joined Ben Gurion University of the Negev, where he became Distinguished Professor Emeritus during 2013–2020.

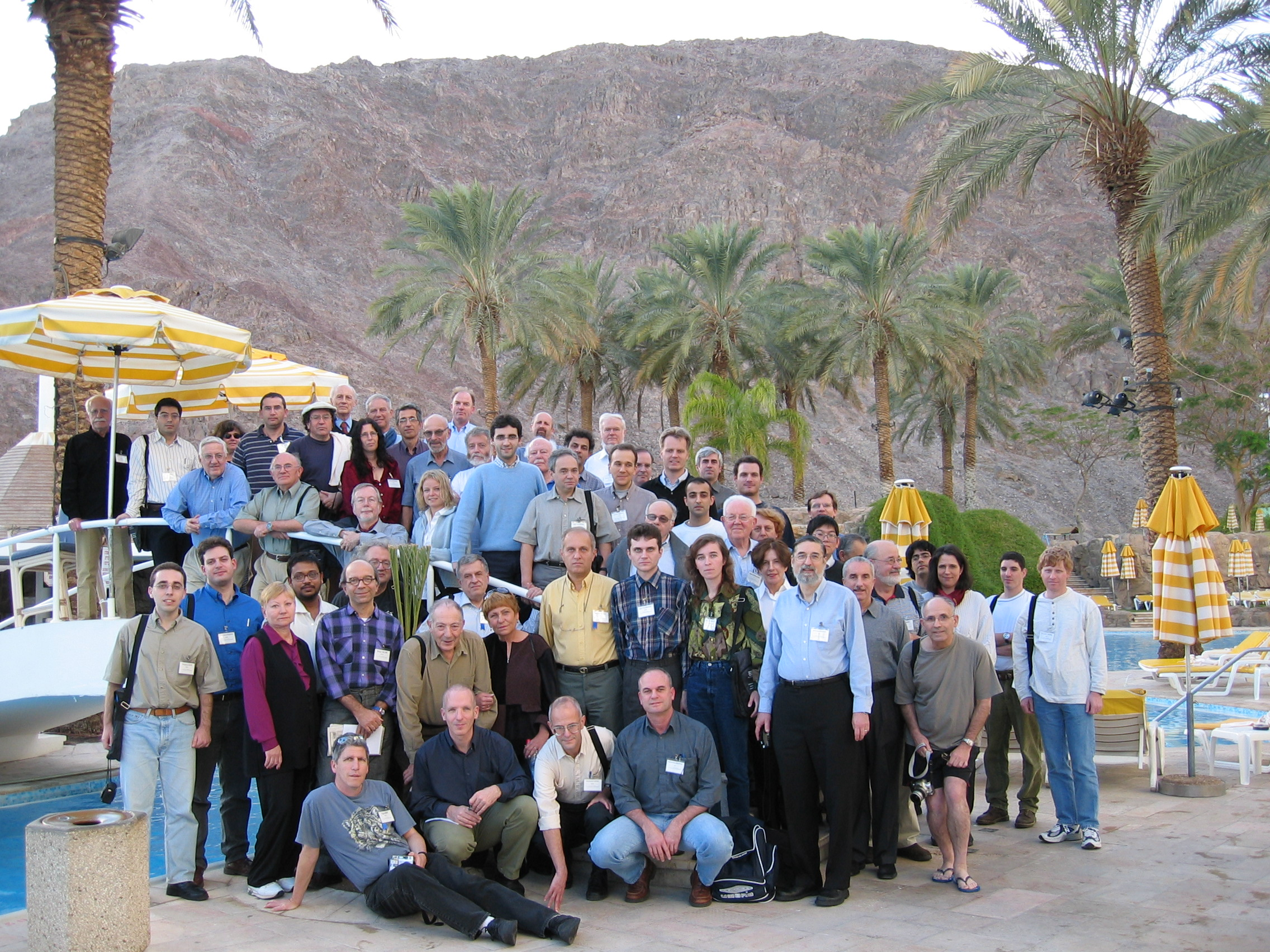
Participants in the conference on "Transport and Magnetism: from the thermodynamic limit to the nano scale", celebrating Aharony's 60th birthday, Eilat, 2004.

During the years, Aharony was a visiting professor at Harvard University, MIT, Boston University, University of Tokyo, NTT Japan, the International Institute of Physics, UFRN, Natal, Brazil, the Institute for Advanced Studies in Jerusalem, the Institute of theoretical physics of the Chinese Academy of Sciences in Beijing. He was also a Distinguished Professor at the National Cheng Kung University, Taiwan and a visiting scientist at the IBM Research laboratories in Yorktown Heights and in Zürich, the US National Laboratories in Argonne and the National Institute of Standards and Technology (NIST), the Beijing Computational Science Research Center and the Institute for Basic Science in Daejeon, Korea. Aharony was also an adjunct professor in the University of Oslo, Norway during the years 1987–2012, and a Consultant at IBM Research, MIT and the Weizmann Institute of Science (1987–present).

== Research ==
Phase transitions: Aharony applied the renormalization group to identify and classify universality classes of critical (e.g. cubic, dipolar) and multicritical points. His work on random systems involved systems with random fields and the general issues of self-averaging. Aharony introduced fractal geometry into several branches of statistical physics, especially in connection with the many fractal sub-structures of dilute percolating systems, with applications to oil recovery.

Quantum magnetism: Aharony explained the structures and phase diagrams of magnetic oxide systems. This includes the magnetic structures of the high temperature superconducting parent cuprates, and the prediction of the spin glass phase there, the discovery of a special symmetry in the Dzyaloshinskii-Moria interaction (now called the Shekhtman-Entin-Wohlman-Aharony symmetry) and the ordered phases of various multiferroic materials.

Mesoscopic physics: Aharony participated in critical discussions of the Aharonov-Bohm interferometer. In recent years, he concentrates on the effects of the spin-orbit interaction on transport in mesoscopic spintronic systems, including proposals of spin filters which may be relevant to quantum information processing.

== Publications ==
Aharony is the author of 8 books and more than 450 articles. According to Google Scholar (September 2026) he has more than 56,000 citations and his h-index is 92.

=== Selected books ===
- A. Aharony and J. Feder, editors. Fractals in Physics. Proceedings of a Conference, Vence, France (North Holland, Amsterdam, 1989)
- D. Stauffer and A. Aharony. Introduction to Percolation Theory. Taylor and Francis, London (1992); revised 2nd edition (1994); German translation: Perkolationstheorie, Eine Einführung, VCH, Weinheim (1995); Japanese translation: PA-KO RE-SHON NO KI HON GEN RI, Yoshiokashoten, Kyoto (2001).
- A. Aharony and O. Entin-Wohlman, editors. Perspectives of Mesoscopic Physics. World Scientific, Singapore (2010)
- A. Aharony and O. Entin-Wohlman. Introduction to Solid State Physics. In Hebrew, Open University, Israel (2018), 600 pages; English translation: World Scientific, Singapore (2018)

== Honors and awards ==
- Fulbright Fellowship, US, 1972
- Fellow, American Physical Society, USA, 1985, "for contributions to the theory of new critical and multicritical points, of random field systems and their experimental realization and of using fractals in statistical physics and in percolation"
- Foreign Member, Norwegian Academy of Science and Letters, Oslo, Norway, 1988
- Member, Royal Norwegian Society of Sciences and Letters, Trondheim, Norway, 1993
- Foreign Honorary Member, American Academy of Arts and Sciences, Cambridge, MA, USA, 2002
- Honorary fellow, Institute of Physics, UK, 2011
- Elected member, Israel Academy of Sciences and Humanities, 2012

== Notable students ==
- Joan Adler
- Serge Galam
- Yigal Meir

== Personal life ==
Aharony is the father of Professor of Physics Ofer Aharony, psychologist Dr. Tamar Aharony and Professor of music Iddo Aharony.
