= Enting =

Enting is both a surname and a given name. Notable people with the name include:

- Ian G. Enting (born 1948), Australian mathematician
- Xi Enting (1946–2019), Chinese table tennis player

== See also ==
- Entin
