= Ora Entin-Wohlman =

Israeli physicist

Professor Ora Entin-Wohlman
- אורה אנטין-וולמן
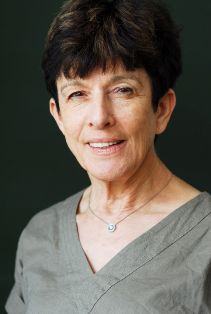
- Born: 21 December 1943 (age 82)
- Citizenship: Israeli
- Education: Technion – Israel Institute of Technology
- Scientific career
- Fields: Condensed matter physics
- Workplaces: Tel Aviv University \ Ben-Gurion University of the Negev

Ora Entin-Wohlman (Hebrew: אורה אנטין-וולמן) is an Israeli condensed matter physicist. She is a professor emeritus at Tel Aviv University and at Ben-Gurion University of the Negev.

== Education and career ==
Entin-Wohlman studied mathematics and physics at the Technion – Israel Institute of Technology, earning a bachelor's degree in both in 1965 and a master's degree in physics in 1967. She completed her Ph.D. at Bar-Ilan University in 1973.

After completing her Ph.D., she became a lecturer at Tel Aviv University, eventually becoming a professor in 1986 and retiring as professor emeritus in 2006. In the same year, she took up a professorship at Ben-Gurion University, where she became professor emeritus in 2013.

== Contributions ==
With Amnon Aharony, Entin-Wohlman is the author of Introduction to Solid State Physics (World Scientific, 2018).

Her work with Hamutal Bary-Soroker and Yoseph Imry on persistent currents in resistive conductors has been described as "so simple, yet compelling, that physicists may wonder why no one has thought of it before".

== Recognition ==
Entin-Wohlman was elected as a Fellow of the American Physical Society in 1993, "for contributions to the theory of granular superconductivity, fractions, strong localization and nonlinear optics in novel materials". She was elected to the American Academy of Arts and Sciences in 2018, as an international honorary member, for her "seminal contributions to a wide range of topics in condensed matter physics theory, including superconductivity, electron and phonon localization, magnetism, nanoscience and spintronics". She is also a foreign member of the Norwegian Academy of Science and Letters. In 2022, she was elected to the Israel Academy of Sciences and Humanities and became an Honorary Fellow of the Institute of Physics.
