= Yoseph Imry =

Israeli physicist (1939–2018)

- יוסף אמרי
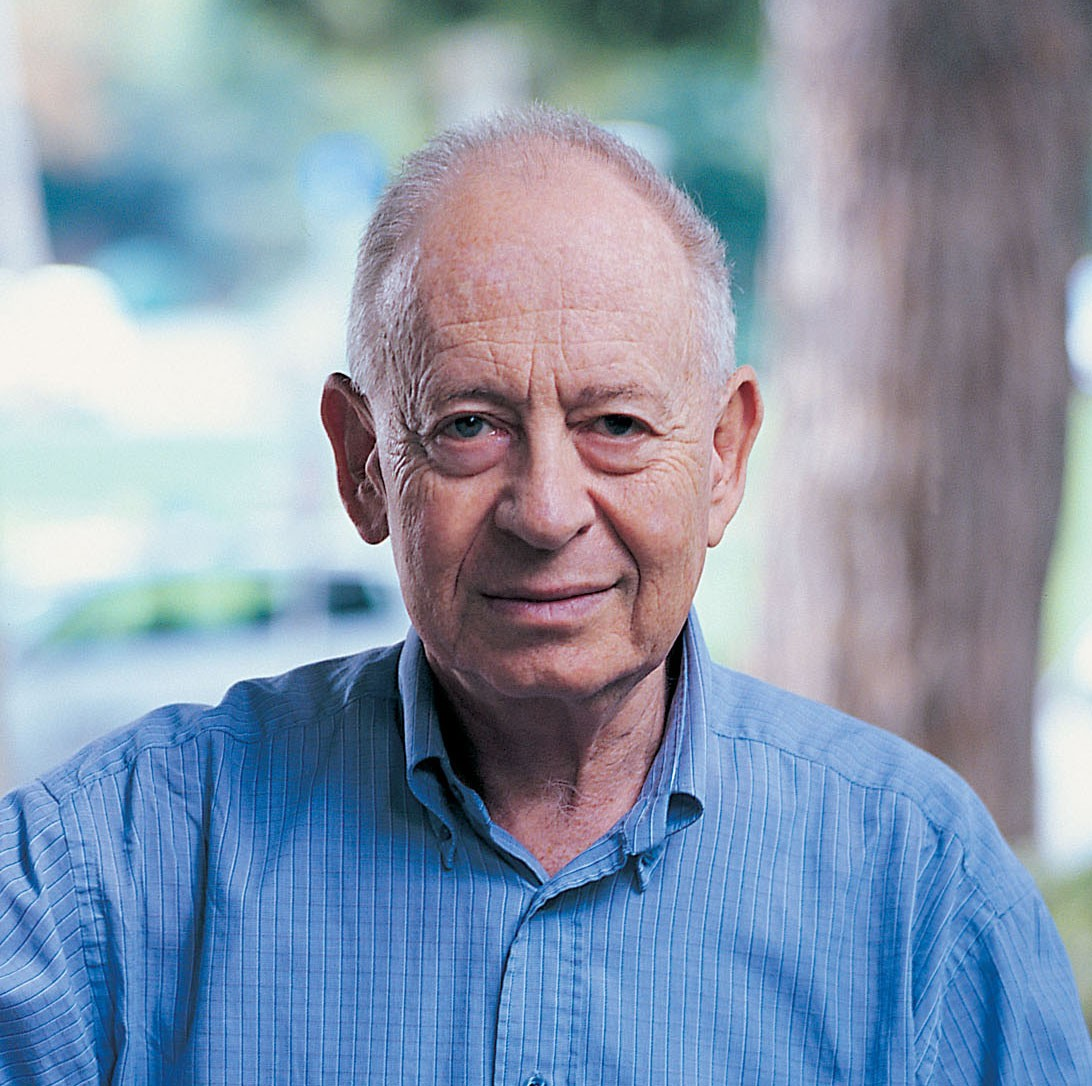
- Joe Imry, Aug. 2008
- Born: 23 February 1939; Tel Aviv, Mandatory Palestine
- Died: 29 May 2018 (aged 79); Tel Aviv, Israel
- Education: Hebrew University of Jerusalem (BSc, MSc); Weizmann Institute of Science (PhD)
- Known for: Imry–Ma argument Persistent currents in normal-metal rings
- Awards: Weizmann Prize (1987); Humboldt Research Award (1993); Rothschild Prize (1996); Israel Prize (2001); EMET Prize (2006); Wolf Prize in Physics (2016)
- Scientific career
- Fields: Mesoscopic physics, statistical physics of disordered systems
- Workplaces: Tel Aviv University (1969–1987); Weizmann Institute of Science (1987–2018); IBM
- Doctoral advisor: Israel Pelach
- Doctoral students: Yigal Meir

Yoseph Imry (Hebrew: יוסף אמרי; 23 February 1939 – 29 May 2018) was an Israeli physicist.

He was best known for taking part in the foundation of mesoscopic physics, a relatively new branch of condensed matter physics. It is concerned with how the behavior of systems whose size is in between micro- and macroscopic, crosses over between these two regimes. These systems can be handled and addressed by more or less usual macroscopic methods, but their behavior may still show quantum effects.

== Awards and honours ==
In 1996, 2001 and 2016, Imry received the Rothschild Prize, Israel Prize and Wolf Prize in Physics, respectively. Imry was the 1996 Lorentz Professor at Leiden University.

He was a member of the European Academy of Sciences and Arts (Salzburg), the European Academy of Sciences, Sciences and Humanities (Paris), the National Academy of Sciences, the American Physical Society and the Israel Academy of Sciences and Humanities.

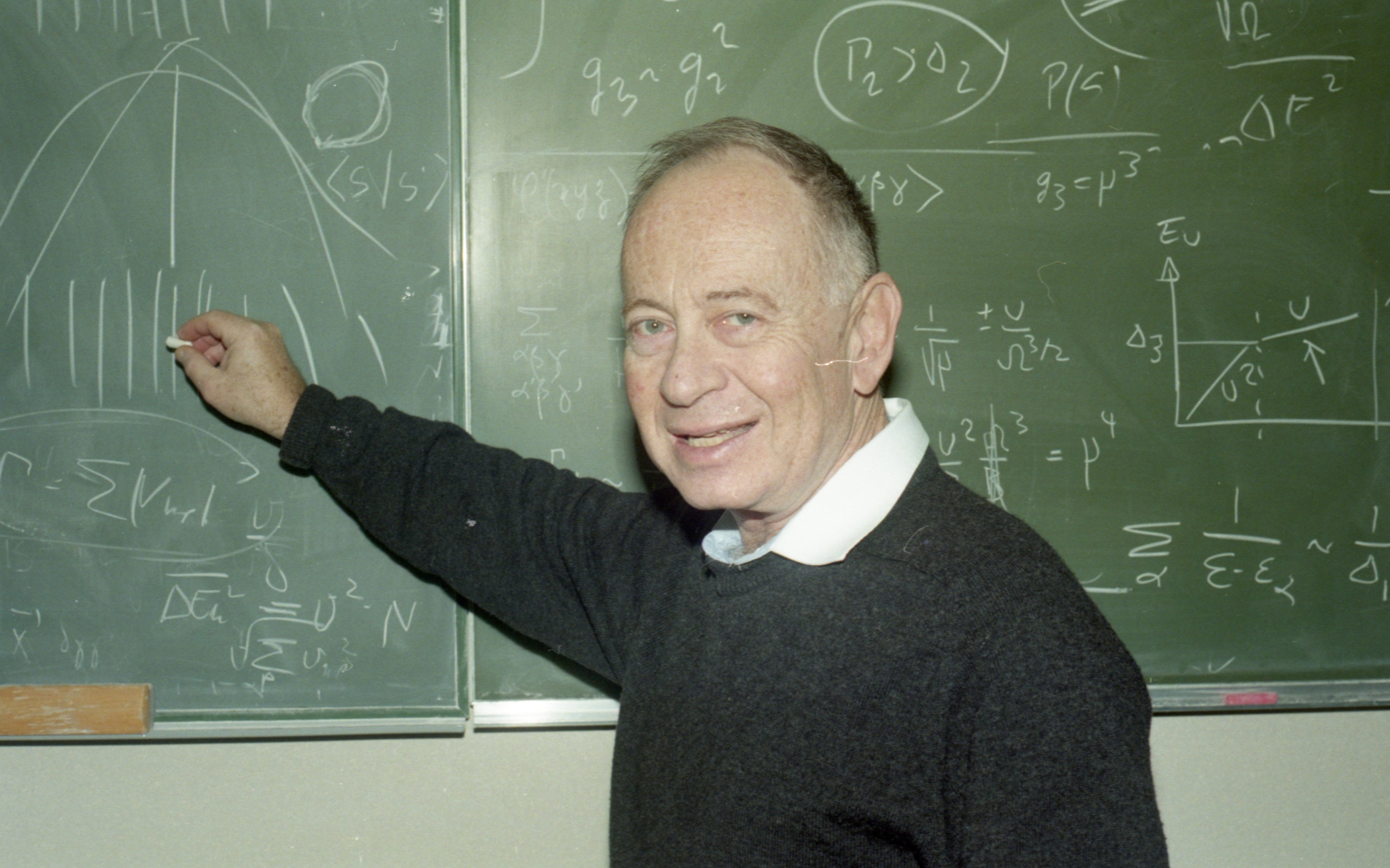
Yoseph Imry, 1996

== See also ==
- List of Israel Prize recipients
