= Ballistic collection transistor =

The ballistic collection transistor is the bipolar transistor exhibiting a ballistic conduction resulting in significant velocity overshoot. Initial demonstration of ballistic conduction in gallium arsenide was done in 1985 by IBM researchers. The amplifier with 40 GHz bandwidth based on heterojunction bipolar transistor gallium arsenide technology implementing ballistic collection transistors was developed in 1994 by Nippon Telegraph and Telephone researchers.

== See also ==
- Ballistic deflection transistor
