= Rolf Landauer =

American-German physicist, engineer (1927–1999)

Rolf William Landauer
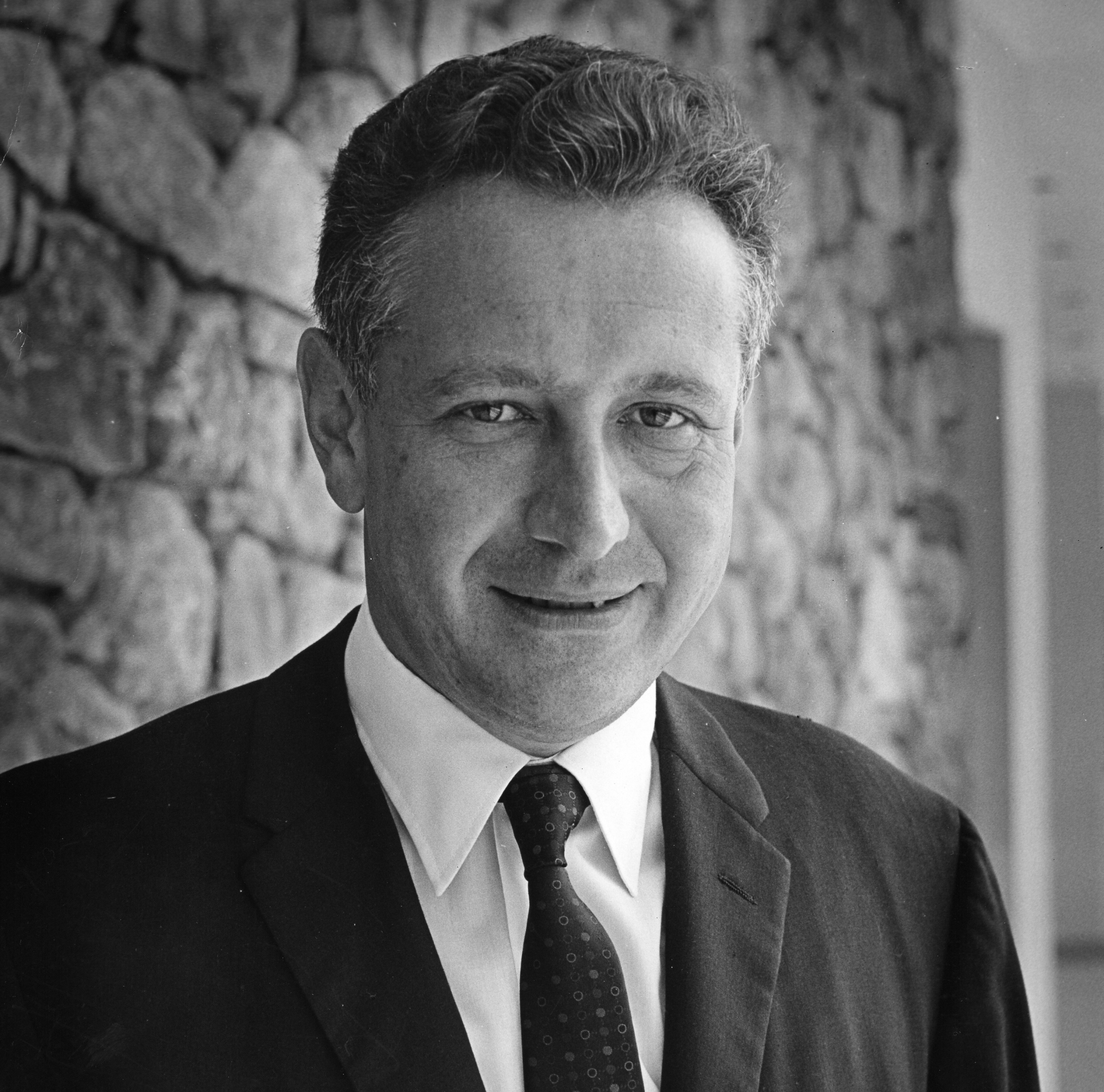
- Landauer in September 1969
- Born: February 4, 1927; Stuttgart, Germany
- Died: April 27, 1999 (aged 72); Briarcliff Manor, New York, U.S.
- Education: Stuyvesant High School; Harvard University
- Known for: Landauer's principle Landauer formula Reversible computation
- Awards: Stuart Ballantine Medal (1992); Oliver E. Buckley Prize (1995); Edison Medal (1998)
- Scientific career
- Fields: Solid-state physics
- Workplaces: NASA; IBM
- Thesis: Phase Integral Approximations in Wave Mechanics: I. Reflections in One-Dimensional Wave Mechanics. II. Phase Integral Approximations in Two and Three Dimensions. (1950)
- Doctoral advisor: Léon Brillouin; Wendell Furry

Rolf William Landauer (February 4, 1927 – April 27, 1999) was a German-American physicist who made important contributions in diverse areas of the thermodynamics of information processing, condensed matter physics, and the conductivity of disordered media. Born in Germany, he emigrated to the U.S. in 1938, obtained a Ph.D. in physics from Harvard in 1950, and then spent most of his career at IBM.

In 1961 he discovered Landauer's principle, that in any logically irreversible operation that manipulates information, such as erasing a bit of memory, entropy increases and an associated amount of energy is dissipated as heat. This principle is relevant to reversible computing, quantum information and quantum computing. He also is responsible for the Landauer formula relating the electrical resistance of a conductor to its scattering properties. He won the Stuart Ballantine Medal of the Franklin Institute, the Oliver Buckley Prize of the American Physical Society and the IEEE Edison Medal, among many other honors.

== Biography ==
Landauer was born on February 4, 1927, in Stuttgart, Germany. He emigrated to the United States in 1938 to escape Nazi persecution of Jews, graduated in 1943 from Stuyvesant High School, one of New York City's mathematics and science magnet schools, and obtained his undergraduate degree from Harvard in 1945. Following service in the US Navy as an Electrician's Mate, he earned his Ph.D. from Harvard in 1950. His advisor was initially Léon Brillouin but he finished the thesis under the supervision of Wendell H. Furry.

He first worked for two years at NASA, then known as the National Advisory Committee for Aeronautics, at its Glenn Research Center, then known as the Lewis Research Center, in Cleveland. At the age of 25, he began a career in semiconductors at IBM Research. As part of the two-man team responsible for managing IBM's Research Division in the mid-1960s, he was involved in a number of programs, including the company's work on semiconductor lasers. In 1969, he was appointed an IBM Fellow.

Much of his research after 1969 related to the kinetics of small structures. He showed that in systems with two or more competing states of local stability, their likelihood depends on noise all along the path connecting them. In electron transport theory, he is particularly associated with the idea, taken from circuit theory, that electric flow can be considered a consequence of current sources as well as applied fields. He was also a pioneer in the area of information handling. His principles have been applied to computers and to the measurement process and are the basis for Landauer's own demonstration that communication, in principle, can be accomplished with arbitrarily little dissipation of energy.

Rolf William Landauer died on 27 April 1999 at his home in Briarcliff Manor from brain cancer.

== Awards and honors ==
- Fellow, IEEE
- Member, National Academy of Engineering
- Member, National Academy of Sciences
- Member, European Academy of Sciences and Arts
- Fellow, American Academy of Arts and Sciences
- Honorary doctorate, Technion in Israel
- 1991 Scott Lecturer at the Cavendish Laboratory at Cambridge University
- 1992 Stuart Ballantine Medal of the Franklin Institute
- Centennial Medal by Harvard in 1993,
- Oliver E. Buckley Prize by the American Physical Society (1995)
- Moet Hennessey Louis Vuitton (LVMH) Science for Art Prize (1997)
- IEEE Edison Medal (1998) For pioneering contributions to the physics of computing and conduction.
- The Rolf Landauer Medal of the International ETOPIM Association (2009)

The range of his work has been recognized in special issues of two journals, 10 years apart: the IBM Journal of Research and Development (January 1988) and Superlattices and Microstructures (March/April 1998).

== See also ==
- Persistent current
- Tunnel ionization
