= Jason Wingreen =

American actor (1920-2015)

- Wingreen in Archie Bunker's Place, 1979
- Born: October 9, 1920; New York City, U.S.
- Died: December 25, 2015 (aged 95); Los Angeles, California, U.S.
- Occupation: Actor
- Years active: 1955–1994
- Known for: All in the Family, Archie Bunker's Place, The Empire Strikes Back
- Spouse: Gloria Scott Backe (m. 1955; died 1996)
- Children: Ned Wingreen

Jason Wingreen (October 9, 1920 – December 25, 2015) was an American actor. He portrayed bartender Harry Snowden on the CBS sitcom All in the Family (1976–1979), a role he reprised on the continuation series Archie Bunker's Place (1979–1983). He was also the original voice of Star Wars character Boba Fett in The Empire Strikes Back (1980).

== Early years ==
Born in 1920 in Brooklyn, New York to a Jewish family, he grew up in Howard Beach, Queens, attended John Adams High School, and graduated from Brooklyn College in 1941. While at Brooklyn College, he participated in the Varsity Dramatic Society. Wingreen originally planned to become a newspaper reporter after writing about high school sports for the Brooklyn Eagle during his high school years.

During World War II, he served with the United States Army Air Force and was stationed in England and Germany. Following his return home, with the aid of the G.I. Bill, he studied acting at New York's New School.

He was a co-founder of the Circle in the Square Theatre company in New York's Greenwich Village, and he appeared for the first time on Broadway in two 1954 plays: The Girl on the Via Flaminia and Fragile Fox.

== Career ==
=== Film ===
I've signed a lot of photos of Boba Fett. I was living a quiet, peaceful, unencumbered life until that news broke, and when the news came out in a Star Wars magazine, for which I'd done an interview, the letters just never stopped.

— Wingreen, on his role as Boba Fett and signing autographs (April 9, 2014)

In 1958, Wingreen had the role of Nichols in the 20th Century Fox production The Bravados.

Wingreen lent his voice to the bounty hunter Boba Fett in the 1980 sequel to Star Wars, The Empire Strikes Back. English actor Jeremy Bulloch physically portrayed the character. For the DVD release of the film in 2004, Wingreen's lines were re-recorded by New Zealand actor Temuera Morrison. The 2002 film Star Wars: Episode II – Attack of the Clones established that Boba Fett was a clone of Jango Fett, who was also played by Morrison.

From the early 1960s Wingreen was a voting member of the Academy of Motion Picture Arts and Sciences.

=== Stage ===
Wingreen helped to found the Circle in the Square Theatre in Greenwich Village. On Broadway, he played in The Girl on the Via Flaminia and Fragile Fox, both in 1954.

=== Television ===
I'm enjoying retirement, but not when I'm not feeling well and, unfortunately, not feeling well seems to come with old age. I retired after I did my episode of Seinfeld. I was 72 and my wife wasn't well. She wanted to travel some more, so I just decided that was enough and I didn't do any more acting. My wife died in 1996 and I've been living alone. My son and his family live in Princeton, New Jersey, and he's a professor at Princeton. He's a terrific guy and he calls me twice a week, to make sure I'm still alive. And I have a grandson and a granddaughter.

— Wingreen, on his retirement (April 9, 2014)

Wingreen was known for his role as bar owner/bartender Harry Snowden on the television sitcom All in the Family and its continuation series, Archie Bunker's Place.

Prior to this, Wingreen was a regular during the 1960–61 season of The Untouchables, playing Police Captain Dorsett. He performed in "A Stop at Willoughby," "The Midnight Sun," and "The Bard," three episodes of the original Twilight Zone series. He also appeared on the original Star Trek series, making him one of the few people involved with both Star Wars and Star Trek. Wingreen also had a recurring role as Judge Arthur Beaumont in the series Matlock, and has guest-starred in numerous other series, including Mission: Impossible, Outer Limits, Bonanza, The Rockford Files, The Armstrong Circle Theatre, Alcoa Theatre, The Man From U.N.C.L.E., The Many Loves of Dobie Gillis, Dr. Kildare, and The Fugitive.

In 1965, Wingreen portrayed Adolf Hitler on Blue Light.

In 1975: Ellery Queen series, one episode: "The adventure of the lover's leap", as Roy Miller.

In 1979, Wingreen was a part of the ensemble cast of the TV mini-series Roots: The Next Generations. In 1991, he guest starred on General Hospital as Judge Mattson.

After an appearance on TV's Seinfeld in the 1990s, Wingreen retired from acting. His last credited TV work was on In The Heat Of The Night in 1994.

== Personal life ==
Wingreen married Gloria Scott Backe. Backe, known as "Scotty" died in 1996. They had one son together.

=== Death ===
Wingreen died at the age of 95 at his home in Los Angeles, California, on December 25, 2015. Jeremy Bulloch, who physically portrayed Boba Fett, paid tribute saying that "he will be sadly missed by his family, friends and all the Star Wars fans."

He was survived by his son, theoretical physicist, Ned Wingreen, two grandchildren, and his sister, Harriet, a former pianist for the New York Philharmonic.

== Filmography ==
=== Film ===
| Year | Title | Role | Notes | ref |
|---|---|---|---|---|
| 1956 | Three Brave Men | Perry | | |
| 1957 | The True Story of Jesse James | Peter | Uncredited | |
| 1958 | The Bravados | Hotel Clerk | Uncredited | |
| 1961 | Everything's Ducky | Lipscott's Helper | Uncredited | |
| 1965 | A Rage to Live | Jim | Uncredited | |
| 1965 | The Slender Thread | Medical Technician | | |
| 1967 | Warning Shot | Reporter Outside Courtroom | Uncredited | |
| 1967 | A Guide for the Married Man | Harry 'Big Fella' Johnson | | |
| 1969 | Marlowe | Camera Store Clerk | | |
| 1970 | The Dunwich Horror | Sheriff Harrison | | |
| 1970 | The Cheyenne Social Club | Dr. Farley Carter | | |
| 1971 | Skin Game | 2nd Speaker | | |
| 1971 | The Todd Killings | Policeman | | |
| 1972 | The Magnificent Seven Ride! | Warden | Uncredited | |
| 1972 | They Only Kill Their Masters | Mallory | | |
| 1974 | The Terminal Man | Instructor | | |
| 1975 | Mr. Ricco | Judge | | |
| 1975 | Hustle | Jim Lang | | |
| 1976 | Moving Violation | Psychiatrist | | |
| 1980 | Airplane! | Dr. Brody | | |
| 1980 | The Empire Strikes Back | Boba Fett | Voice in original release and 1997 Special Edition, replaced by Temuera Morrison since all 2004 re-releases; Also known as Star Wars Episode V: The Empire Strikes Back | |
| 1984 | Oh God! | Hotel Manager | | |
| 1984 | The Red Fury | Mr. Taylor | | |
| 1988 | Arthur 2: On the Rocks | Boardmember #2 | | |

=== Television ===
| Year | Title | Role | Notes | Ref. |
|---|---|---|---|---|
| 1955 | The Armstrong Circle Theatre | Guest | Episode: "Crisis (AKA Jet Pilot)" (S 6:Ep 33) | |
| 1956 | Playhouse 90 | The Captain | Episode: "Forbidden Area (Pilot)" (S 1:Ep 1) | |
| 1957 | Kraft Television Theatre | Sweeny | Episode: "The Killer Instinct" (S 10:Ep 52) | |
| 1958 | Steve Canyon | Guest | Episode: "Operation Heartbeat" (S 1:Ep 4) | |
| 1958 | The Rough Riders | Degnan | Episode: "The Duelists" (S 1:Ep 4) | |
| 1958 | Playhouse 90 | Reporter with Capone | Episode: "Seven Against the Wall" (S 3:Ep 11) | |
| 1958 | Alcoa Theatre | Gene Vermeth | Episode: "Coogan's Reward" (S 2:Ep 15) | |
| 1959 | Alcoa Theatre | Hirsh | Episode: "The Best Way To Go" (S 2:Ep 38) | |
| 1959 | The Many Loves of Dobie Gillis | Theater Manager | Episode: "Caper at the Bijou (Pilot)" (S 1:Ep 1) | |
| 1959 | Five Fingers | Dentist | Episode: "The Man With The Triangle Heads" (S 1:Ep 5) | |
| 1959 | The Troubleshooters | Pophir | Episode: "Pipeline" (S 1:Ep 8) | |
| 1959 | Playhouse 90 | Blair | Episode: "The Tunnel" (S 4:Ep 6) | |
| 1959 | Adventures in Paradise | Romer | Episode: "The Bamboo Curtain" (S 1:Ep 10) | |
| 1960 | The Many Loves of Dobie Gillis | Mr. McGruder | Episode: "Love Is a Fallacy" (S 1:Ep 22) | |
| 1960 | Johnny Staccato | Desk Sergeant | Episode: "A Nice Little Town" (S 1:Ep 25) | |
| 1960 | Bourbon Street Beat | Ben Anderson | Episode: "Swamp Fire" (S 1:Ep 27) | |
| 1960 | Twilight Zone | Train Conductor | Episode: "A Stop at Willoughby" (S 1:Ep 30) | |
| 1960 | Wanted: Dead or Alive | Nick Peters | Episode: "Journey for Josh" (S 3:Ep 3) | |
| 1960 | The Untouchables | Turner | Episode: "The Mark Of Cain" (S 2:Ep 5) | |
| 1961 | Surfside 6 | Simm | Episode: "License to Steal" (S 1:Ep 19) | |
| 1961 | The Twilight Zone | Mr. Shuster | Episode: "The Midnight Sun" (S 3:Ep 10) | |
| 1962 | Margie | Wallace | Episode: "The Wolf of Wall Street: (S 1:Ep 25) | |
| 1962 | The Untouchables | Second Hood | Episode: "The Pea" (S 4:Ep 5) | |
| 1962 | Disney's World of Color | Narrator | | |
| 1962 | The Untouchables | Phil Banyas | Episode: "The Eddie O'Gara Story" (S 4:Ep 7) | |
| 1963 | The Outer Limits | Fred Severn | Episode: "O.B.I.T." (S 1:Ep 7) | |
| 1963 | The Fugitive | Tim Cates | Episode: "See Hollywood and Die" (S 1:Ep 8); Uncredited | |
| 1963 | Bonanza | Hank | Episode: "The Way of Aaron" (S4:Ep 24) | |
| 1964 | The Fugitive | Friar | Episode: "Angels Travel on Lonely Roads, part 1" (S 1:Ep 24) | |
| 1964 | The Outer Limits | Bill Turner | Episode: "The Special One" (S 1:Ep 28) | |
| 1964 | Bonanza | Luke | Episode: "Enter Thomas Bowers" (S 5:Ep 30) | |
| 1964 | The Outer Limits | Coroner Leland | Episode: "Expanding Human" (S 2:Ep 4) | |
| 1964 | Twelve O'Clock High | Major Rosen | Episode: "Pressure Point" (S 1:Ep 6) | |
| 1964 | Slattery's People | Mr. Samuels | Episode: "Question: Where Vanished the Tragic Piper?" (S 1:Ep 7) | |
| 1964 | Profiles in Courage | Reporter | Episode: "The Mary S. McDowell Story" (S 1:Ep 2) | |
| 1964 | Bob Hope Presents The Chrysler Theatre | Birdie Max | Episode: "Parties to the Crime" (S 2:Ep 7) | |
| 1964 | Profiles in Courage | Hanson | Episode: "Thomas Hart Benton" (S 1:Ep 3) | |
| 1964 | The Fugitive | Photographer | Episode: "The Iron Maiden" (S 2:Ep 13) | |
| 1965 | The Man From U.N.C.L.E. | Hackie | Episode: "The Deadly Decoy Affair" (S 1:Ep 15) | |
| 1965 | Twelve O'Clock High | Major Rosen | Episode: "The Clash: (S 1:Ep 21) | |
| 1965 | Dr. Kildare | Painter | Episode: "Do You Trust Your Doctor?" (S 4:Ep 23) | |
| 1965 | The Rogues | Guest | Episode: "The Pigeons of Paris" (S 1:Ep 25) | |
| 1965 | Voyage to the Bottom of the Sea | Mikhil Brynov | Episode: "The Exile" (S 1:Ep 27) | |
| 1965 | Kraft Suspense Theatre | Savadow | Episode: "Kill No More" (S 2:Ep 23) | |
| 1965 | The Fugitive | Jack | Episode: "Three Cheers for Little Boy Blue" (S 3:Ep 6) | |
| 1965 | Amos Burke: Secret Agent | Gunter Ernst | Episode: "The Weapon" (S 1:Ep 9) | |
| 1965 | The Loner | Lucas | Episode: "Hunt the Man Down" (S 1:Ep 13) | |
| 1966 | The Man From U.N.C.L.E. | Loser in Casino | Episode: "The Birds and the Bees Affair" (S 2:Ep 18) | |
| 1966 | The Wild Wild West | Policeman | Episode: "The Night of the Whirring Death: (S 1:Ep 20) | |
| 1966 | Get Smart | KAOS Agent #2 | Episode: "Stakeout on Blue Mist Mountain" (S 1:Ep 24) | |
| 1966 | Blue Light | Adolf Hitler | Episode: "Invasion by the Stars" (S 1:Ep 9) | |
| 1966 | The Fugitive | Reporter | Episode: "The 2130" (S 3:Ep 27) | |
| 1966 | A Man Called Shenandoah | Hotel Clerk | Episode: "Requiem for the Second" (S 1:Ep 32) | |
| 1966 | Felony Squad | Joe Caslin | Episode: "A Walk To Oblivion" (S 1:Ep 2) | |
| 1966 | The Girl from U.N.C.L.E. | Fahd | Episode: "The Prisoner of Zalamar Affair: (S 1:Ep 2) | |
| 1966 | Shane | Ira Jackson | Episode: "Day of the Hawk" (S 1:Ep 7) | |
| 1966 | Run for Your Life | Harbormaster | Episode: "The Man Who Had No Enemies" (S 2:Ep 10) | |
| 1966–1967 | The Rounders | Shorty Dawes | Main cast | |
| 1967 | Captain Nice | Thug 1 | Episode: "That Thing" (S 1:Ep 3) | |
| 1967 | The Fugitive | Nebbs | Episode: "Concrete Evidence" (S 4:Ep 18) | |
| 1967 | The Green Hornet | Doctor | Episode: "Bad Bet on a 459—Silent" (S 1:Ep 21) | |
| 1967 | Felony Squad | Morrie | Episode: "Target!" (S 1:Ep 24) | |
| 1967 | The Girl from U.N.C.L.E. | Dictator | Episode: "The Phi Beta Killer Affair" (S 1:Ep 25) | |
| 1967 | Please Don't Eat the Daisies | Doctor | Episode: "When I Was a Young Man" (S 2:Ep 25) | |
| 1967 | The Road West | Norman Todd | Episode: "The Agreement" (S 1:Ep 28) | |
| 1967 | The Invaders | Clerk | Episode: "The Trial" (S 2:Ep 6) | |
| 1967 | Felony Squad | Collier | Episode: "Hit and Run, Run, Run" (S2:Ep 8) | |
| 1967 | Judd, for the Defense | Judge | Episode: "To Kill A Madman" (S 1:Ep 12) | |
| 1967 | The Man From U.N.C.L.E. | Security Guard | Uncredited; Episode: "The Maze Affair" (S 4:Ep 13) | |
| 1967–1969 | Ironside | Bell Captain, Man and Sam Freeman | Episodes: "Light at the End of the Journey: (S 1:Ep 10), Episode: "I, the People" (S 2:Ep 7) and "Rundown on a Bum Rap" (S 2:Ep 17) | |
| 1968–1972 | Adam-12 | Mr. Kerr, Tom Beaten and Suspect | Episodes: "Log 122: Christmas – The Yellow Dump Truck" (S 1:Ep 13), "Log 106: Post Time" (S 3:Ep 24) and "Log 102: The Wednesday Warrior" (S 4:Ep 24) | |
| 1968 | Cimarron Strip | Mr. Glass | Episode: "Heller" (S 1:Ep 17) | |
| 1968 | The Guns of Will Sonnett | Milby | Episode: "Stopover in a Troubled Town" (S 1:Ep 22) | |
| 1968 | Judd, for the Defense | Judge | Episode: "The Devil's Surrogate" (S 1:Ep 23) | |
| 1968 | Felony Squad | Art Rice | Episode: "Kiss Me, Kill You" (S 3:Ep 5) | |
| 1968 | The Name of the Game | District Attorney | Episode: "The Ordeal" (S 1:Ep 10) | |
| 1968 | Star Trek | Dr. Linke | Episode: "The Empath" (S 3:Ep 12) | |
| 1968 | Mission: Impossible | Official | Episode: "The Play" (S 3:Ep 9) | |
| 1969 | Mannix | Barney | Episode: "The Solid Gold Web" (S 2:Ep 23) | |
| 1970 | CBS Playhouse | Guest | Episode: "The Day Before Sunday" (S 3:Ep 3) | |
| 1970 | Mayberry R.F.D. | Mr. Desmond | Episode: "Emmett Takes a Fall" (S 2:Ep 15) | |
| 1973 | Miracle on 34th Street | Halloran | | |
| 1973 | Kojak | 1st Reporter | Episode: Girl in the River (S 1:Ep 5) | |
| 1973 | Outrage | Mr. Bunce | | |
| 1974 | Honky Tonk | | | |
| 1974 | The Terminal Man | Instructor | | |
| 1975 | Hustle | Jim Lang | | |
| 1976 | Louis Armstrong: Chicago Style | Second Detective | Made-for-TV-Movie; Directed by Lee Philips | |
| 1977–1979 | All in the Family | Harry Snowden | Recurring | |
| 1978 | Vega$ | Hank Adamek | Uncredited | |
| 1979–1983 | Archie Bunker's Place | Harry Snowden | Recurring | |
| 1979 | Captain America | Doctor #2 | | |
| 1987 | Hunter | Benjamin Winfield | Episode: "Double Exposure" | |
| 1987 | Highway To Heaven | Ben Conrad | Episode: "Playing for Keeps" | |
| 1987–1991 | Matlock | Judge Arthur Beaumont | 11 episodes | |
| 1989 | Mama's Family | Fred Gebhardt | Episode: "Hate Thy Neighbor" | |
| 1991 | General Hospital | Judge Mattson | Episode: "1.7242" | |
| 1992 | Seinfeld | Man #2 | Episode: "The Opera" (S 4:Ep 9) | |
| 1994 | In the Heat of the Night | Georgie | Episode: "Who Was Geli Bendl?" (S 8:Ep 2), (final appearance) | |
