= Conductance quantum =

Quantized unit of electrical conductance

The conductance quantum, denoted by the symbol G_{0}, is the quantized unit of electrical conductance. It is defined by the elementary charge e and Planck constant h as:

$G_0 = \frac{2 e^2}{h} = 4 \alpha \epsilon_0 c$ = 7.748091729...×10^{−5} S. (Note: S is the siemens)

It appears when measuring the conductance of a quantum point contact, and, more generally, is a key component of the Landauer formula, which relates the electrical conductance of a quantum conductor to its quantum properties. It is twice the reciprocal of the von Klitzing constant (2/R_{K}).

Note that the conductance quantum does not mean that the conductance of any system must be an integer multiple of G_{0}. Instead, it describes the conductance of two quantum channels (one channel for spin up and one channel for spin down) if the probability for transmitting an electron that enters the channel is unity, i.e. if transport through the channel is ballistic. If the transmission probability is less than unity, then the conductance of the channel is less than G_{0}. The total conductance of a system is equal to the sum of the conductances of all the parallel quantum channels that make up the system.

== Derivation ==
In a 1D wire, connecting two reservoirs of potential $u_1$ and $u_2$ adiabatically:

The density of states is
$$\frac{\mathrm{d}n}{\mathrm{d} \epsilon} = \frac{2}{hv} ,$$
where the factor 2 comes from electron spin degeneracy, $h$ is the Planck constant, and $v$ is the electron velocity.

The voltage is:
$$V = -\frac{(\mu_1 - \mu_2)}{e} ,$$
where $e$ is the electron charge.

The 1D current going across is the current density:
$$j = -ev(\mu_1-\mu_2) \frac{\mathrm{d}n}{\mathrm{d} \epsilon} .$$

This results in a quantized conductance:
$$G_0 = \frac{I}{V}  = \frac{j}{V} = \frac{2e^2}{h} .$$

== Occurrence ==
Quantized conductance occurs in wires that are ballistic conductors, when the elastic mean free path is much larger than the length of the wire: $l_{\rm el} \gg L$. B. J. van Wees et al. first observed the effect in a point contact in 1988. Carbon nanotubes have quantized conductance independent of diameter. The quantum Hall effect can be used to precisely measure the conductance quantum value. It also occurs in electrochemistry reactions and in association with the quantum capacitance defines the rate with which electrons are transferred between quantum chemical states as described by the quantum rate theory.

== See also ==
- Mesoscopic physics
- Quantum point contact
- Quantum wire
- Thermal conductance quantum
