= Electrostatic deflection =

Applying an electric field to change the trajectory of a charged particle beam

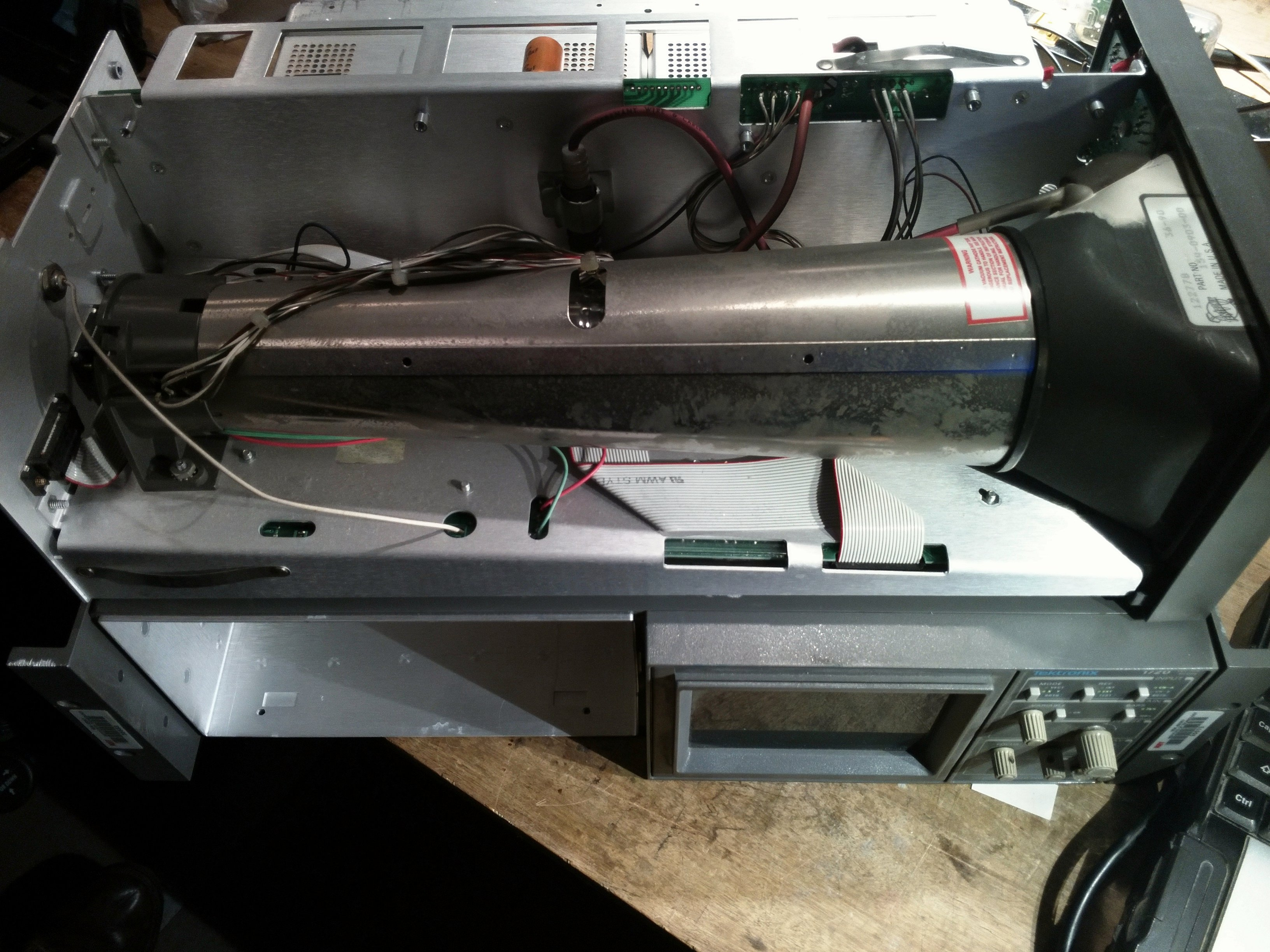
The CRT in this Tektronix vectorscope uses electrostatic deflection, which only allows for small angles and requires a very deep tube.

In electromagnetism, electrostatic deflection refers to a way of modifying the path of a beam of charged particles by the use of an electric field applied transverse to the path of the particles. The technique is called electrostatic because the strength and direction of the applied field changes slowly relative to the time it takes for the particles to transit the field, and thus can be considered not to change (be static) for any single particle.

== Explanation ==
The Lorentz force acts on any charged particle in an electrostatic deflection. Electrostatic deflection uses a special, simplified case of this general effect by limiting the field to an electric field. An electric field applies a force on a particle that is proportional to the strength of the field and to the charge on the particle. The direction of the applied force is the same as the direction of the electric field for positive charges and opposite for negative charges. For electrostatic deflection, the applied electric field is arranged so that it lies in the plane perpendicular to the initial direction of the stream. The particles are accelerated by this force in proportion to the charge of the particles. The path the particles follow depends on their sideways acceleration and their velocity when they enter the deflecting field. Therefore, it is important for good control of the direction that the particles in the stream have a uniform charge-to-mass ratio and that they move at a uniform speed.

== Uses ==
The most common use for this technique is controlling the path of a stream of electrons in a vacuum. One application is in small cathode-ray tubes for oscilloscopes. In these tubes the electric field is created by two sets of paired electrodes, mounted at right angles, that the electron stream flows between. This arrangement allows independent deflection of the beam in two dimensions (usually perceived as up/down (vertical) and right/left (horizontal)). The electrodes are commonly called deflection plates. Traditionally, the electrons pass through the vertical deflection plates first, yielding slightly higher sensitivity because of the longer travel time from the vertical deflection plates to the phosphor screen as compared to the horizontal deflection plates. In very high speed oscilloscopes, the deflection plates were often complex structures, combining a series of sub-plates with an electrical delay line. By matching the propagation speed of the electrical signal with the transit speed of the electrons, maximum bandwidth (frequency response) was achieved.

The technique works well whenever a sufficiently uniform stream can be created, as discussed above. Therefore, it has been used in controlling macroscopic particle streams, for instance in fluorescence-activated cell sorting, as well. Another application was in one type of inkjet printer.

Electrostatic deflection is very useful for small deflection angles but is well known to be inferior to magnetic deflection for deflecting a charged particle beam into large angles - say over 10 degrees. The reason is that deflection aberrations become large as the deflection angle increases. This reduces the ability to finely focus the beam. Also in electrostatic deflection it has long been the practice to inject the beam midway between the charged deflection plates so as to avoid the fringe fields as much as possible. However it was found by computation methods that deflection aberrations would be significantly reduced if the beam were injected offset toward the attracting plate. That way the beam tends to follow equipotentials and the deflection force is normal to the beam direction. Thus offset, all the electrons in the beam are deflected into the same angle. There is an induced astigmatism that is correctable. This deflection idea has been tested and verified. Deflection angles of 50 degrees are reportedly possible without measurable deflection aberration. Optimal injection offset is approximately 1/3 of the plate gap toward the deflecting plate. The useful beam diameter is also approximately 1/3 of the gap.

== See also ==
- Electricity
- Static electricity
