= Ballistic deflection transistor =

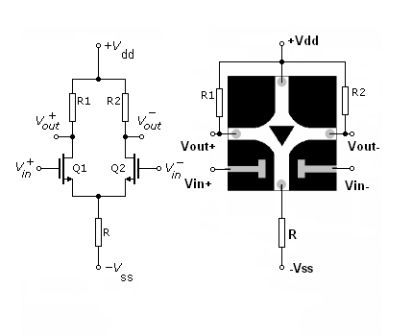

Ballistic deflection transistors (BDTs) are electronic devices, developed since 2006, for high-speed integrated circuits, which is a set of circuits bounded on semiconductor material. They use electromagnetic forces instead of a logic gate, a device used to perform solely on specified inputs, to switch the forces of electrons. The unique design of this transistor includes individual electrons bouncing from wedge-shaped obstacles called deflectors. Initially accelerated by electric field, electrons are then guided on their respective paths by electromagnetic deflection. Electrons are therefore able to travel without being scattered by atoms or defects, thus resulting in improved speed and reduced power consumption.

== Purpose ==
A ballistic deflection transistor would be significant in acting as both a linear amplifier and a switch for current flow on electronic devices, which could be used to maintain digital logic and memory. A transistor switching speed is greatly affected by how fast charge carriers (typically, electrons) can cross from one region to the next. For this reason, researchers want to use ballistic conduction to improve the charge-carrier traveling time. The conventional MOS transistors also dissipate a lot of heat due inelastic collisions of electrons and must switch fast in order to reduce time intervals when the heat is generated, reducing their utility in linear circuits.

== Advantages ==
One advantage of the ballistic deflection transistor is that because such device will use very little power (implementing adiabatic circuit), it will produce less heat, and therefore be able to operate faster or with higher duty cycle. Thus, it will be easier to utilize in the variety of applications. This design will also reduce electrical noise that come from the electronic devices. Along with an increased speed, another advantage of the ballistic deflection transistor is that it will be usable in both aspects of linear amplifier and switch. Additionally, the ballistic deflection transistors are intrinsically small, because only small size allows to reduce the role of mechanisms responsible for inelastic scattering of electrons, normally dominating larger devices.

== Alternative approaches to ballistic conduction ==
The goal of many laboratories around the world is creating switches and amplifiers that can operate faster than current technology. Specifically, electrons within the device should demonstrate a ballistic conduction behavior. Currently, the silicon MOS field-effect transistor (MOSFET) is the main and leading circuit. However, researchers predict that finding the ideal semiconductor will decrease the dimensions of the transistor, even below the sizes observed in the current generation of the silicon transistors, resulting in many undesirable effects lowering the performance of the MOS transistors. Since early 1960s, there has been research aiming for the ballistic conduction, which lead to modern metal-insulator-metal diodes, but it failed to produce a three-terminal switch. Another approach to ballistic conduction was to reduce scattering by lowering temperature, resulting in superconducting computing. The ballistic deflection transistor comprise the recent (in 2006) design been created by the Cornell Nanofabrication Facility, using a two-dimensional electron gas as the conducting medium.

An earlier vacuum-tube device called a beam deflection tube provided a similar functionality based on a similar principle.
