= Mesoscopic physics =

Subdiscipline of condensed matter physics

Mesoscopic physics is a subdiscipline of condensed matter physics that deals with materials of an intermediate size. These materials range in size between the nanoscale for a quantity of atoms (such as a molecule) and of materials measuring micrometres. The lower limit can also be defined as being the size of individual atoms. At the microscopic scale are bulk materials. Both mesoscopic and macroscopic objects contain many atoms. Whereas average properties derived from constituent materials describe macroscopic objects, as they usually obey the laws of classical mechanics, a mesoscopic object, by contrast, is affected by thermal fluctuations around the average, and its electronic behavior may require modeling at the level of quantum mechanics.

A macroscopic electronic device, when scaled down to a meso-size, starts revealing quantum mechanical properties. For example, at the macroscopic level the conductance of a wire increases continuously with its diameter. However, at the mesoscopic level, the wire's conductance is quantized: the increases occur in discrete, or individual, whole steps. During research, mesoscopic devices are constructed, measured and observed experimentally and theoretically in order to advance understanding of the physics of insulators, semiconductors, metals, and superconductors. The applied science of mesoscopic physics deals with the potential of building nanodevices.

Mesoscopic physics also addresses fundamental practical problems which occur when a macroscopic object is miniaturized, as with the miniaturization of transistors in semiconductor electronics. The mechanical, chemical, and electronic properties of materials change as their size approaches the nanoscale, where the percentage of atoms at the surface of the material becomes significant. For bulk materials larger than one micrometre, the percentage of atoms at the surface is insignificant in relation to the number of atoms in the entire material. The subdiscipline has dealt primarily with artificial structures of metal or semiconducting material which have been fabricated by the techniques employed for producing microelectronic circuits.

There is no rigid definition for mesoscopic physics but the systems studied are normally in the range of 100 nm (the size of a typical virus) to 1 000 nm (the size of a typical bacterium): 100 nanometers is the approximate upper limit for a nanoparticle. Thus, mesoscopic physics has a close connection to the fields of nanofabrication and nanotechnology. Devices used in nanotechnology are examples of mesoscopic systems. Three categories of new electronic phenomena in such systems are interference effects, quantum confinement effects and charging effects.

== Ballistic conduction ==
In mesoscopic physics, materials are of intermediate size between the microscopic and macroscopic scales. As a result, the nature of electronic transport depends critically on the distance to be crossed by the carriers ($L$) compared to the mean free path ($L_m$) of the charge carriers.

In the diffusive case, where $L \approx L_m$ and carriers undergo multiple scattering events, transport is described by the semiclassical Boltzmann transport equation.

In contrast, when $L<L_m$, scattering becomes negligible and the system enters the ballistic transport, that works really different from diffusive transport. Here, electrons go through the material without collisions, preserving their energy and phase coherence. This is because we can consider electrons as waves whose energy does not change at any time. In this way, quantum mechanics can be used to describe how this transport is. In this regime the wire conductance is quantized in units of conductance quantum $2e^2/h$ (where $e$ is the elementary charge and $h$ is the Planck constant).

== Quantum confinement effects ==
Quantum confinement effects describe electrons in terms of energy levels, potential wells, valence bands, conduction bands, and electron energy band gaps.

Electrons in bulk dielectric materials (larger than 10 nm) can be described by energy bands or electron energy levels. Electrons exist at different energy levels or bands. In bulk materials these energy levels are described as continuous because the difference in energy is negligible. As electrons stabilize at various energy levels, most vibrate in valence bands below a forbidden energy level, named the band gap. This region is an energy range in which no electron states exist. A smaller amount have energy levels above the forbidden gap, and this is the conduction band.

The quantum confinement effect can be observed once the diameter of the particle is of the same magnitude as the wavelength of the electron's wave function. When materials are this small, their electronic and optical properties deviate substantially from those of bulk materials. As the material is miniaturized towards nano-scale the confining dimension naturally decreases. The characteristics are no longer averaged by bulk, and hence continuous, but are at the level of quanta and thus discrete. In other words, the energy spectrum becomes discrete, measured as quanta, rather than continuous as in bulk materials. As a result, the bandgap asserts itself: there is a small and finite separation between energy levels. This situation of discrete energy levels is called quantum confinement.

In addition, quantum confinement effects consist of isolated islands of electrons that may be formed at the patterned interface between two different semiconducting materials. The electrons typically are confined to disk-shaped regions termed quantum dots. The confinement of the electrons in these systems changes their interaction with electromagnetic radiation significantly, as noted above.

Because the electron energy levels of quantum dots are discrete rather than continuous, the addition or subtraction of just a few atoms to the quantum dot has the effect of altering the boundaries of the bandgap. Changing the geometry of the surface of the quantum dot also changes the bandgap energy, owing again to the small size of the dot, and the effects of quantum confinement.

== Interference effects ==
In the mesoscopic regime, scattering from defects – such as impurities – induces interference effects which modulate the flow of electrons. The experimental signature of mesoscopic interference effects is the appearance of reproducible fluctuations in physical quantities. For example, the conductance of a given specimen oscillates in an apparently random manner as a function of fluctuations in experimental parameters. However, the same pattern may be retraced if the experimental parameters are cycled back to their original values; in fact, the patterns observed are reproducible over a period of days. These are known as universal conductance fluctuations.

== Time-resolved mesoscopic dynamics ==
Time-resolved experiments in mesoscopic dynamics: the observation and study, at nanoscales, of condensed phase dynamics such as crack formation in solids, phase separation, and rapid fluctuations in the liquid state or in biologically relevant environments; and the observation and study, at nanoscales, of the ultrafast dynamics of non-crystalline materials.

== Related ==
- Aharonov–Bohm nano rings – Electromagnetic quantum-mechanical effect in regions of zero magnetic and electric field
- Branched flow – Scattering phenomenon in wave dynamics
- Ballistic conduction – Movement of charge carriers with negligible scattering
- Coulomb blockade – Term in mesoscopic physics
- Coulomb drag – Induced electric currents due to proximity between two conductors
- Nanomaterials – Materials whose granular size lies between 1 and 100 nm
- Nanophysics – Technology with features near one nanometer
- Nanotechnology – Technology with features near one nanometer
- Persistent current – Perpetual electric current, not requiring an external power sources
- Quantum chaos – Branch of physics seeking to explain chaotic dynamical systems in terms of quantum theory
- Quantum Hall effect – Electromagnetic effect in physics
- Quantum wire – Electrical wire where quantum effects influence transport properties
- Random matrix – Matrix-valued random variable
- Semiclassical physics – Use of both classical and quantum physics to analyze a system
- Spin–orbit interaction – Relativistic interaction in quantum physics
- Weak localization – Quantum physical phenomenon
