= TFD =

TFD may stand for:

== Computer games and films ==
- The Final Destination, a 2009 3D horror/thriller film
- Army of Two: The 40th Day, a video game
- Command & Conquer: The First Decade, a compilation of Command & Conquer series computer games

== Fire departments ==
- Tallahassee Fire Department, the fire and rescue service of Tallahassee, Florida
- Tokyo Fire Department, the fire and rescue service of Tokyo, Japan
- Timmins Fire Department, statutory fire department of Timmins, Ontario
- Toronto Fire Department, former name of Toronto Fire Services

== Companies and organizations ==
- The Film Department, a film production company in California
- The Forests Dialogue, an organization sponsored by Yale University School of Forestry and Environmental Studies
- Taiwan Foundation for Democracy, NGO based in Taiwan

== Other uses ==
- The Free Dictionary, an online dictionary
- "Two-Four-D", the spelled out form of 2,4-D, a herbicide
- Thermo Field Dynamics, a topic within thermal quantum field theory
- Thin-film diode, an active matrix backplane alternative to thin-film transistor technology
- Top Fuel dragster, a type of drag racing car
- Transcription factors database, an index of DNA transcription factors
- Toothpaste for dinner, a webcomic
- The Fully Down (1993-2008), a former Canadian band
- Total Foreign Debt, see external debt
