= Characteristic curve =

Characteristic curve may refer to:

- A current–voltage characteristic curve in electronics
  - Semiconductor curve tracer, a device for displaying the above curve
- Characteristic curve (photography), a plot of film density versus exposure
- Characteristic curve, used in the method of characteristics for solving partial differential equations
