= Thin film electronics =

Thin film electronics may refer to:

- Devices
  - Thin-film diode
  - Thin-film transistor
  - Organic field-effect transistor
  - Thin-film solar cell
    - Silicon thin-film cell
  - Thin-film-transistor liquid-crystal display
  - Thin-film memory
  - Printed electronics
- Companies
  - Thin Film Electronics ASA
