= Marija Drndic =

American scientist

- Education: Harvard University; University of Cambridge
- Scientific career
- Workplaces: Massachusetts Institute of Technology; University of Pennsylvania

Marija Drndic (born November 2, 1971) is the Fay R. and Eugene L. Langberg Professor of Physics at the University of Pennsylvania. She works on two-dimensional materials and novel spectroscopic techniques.

== Early life and education ==
Drndic studied physics and mathematics at Harvard University and spent a year at the University of Cambridge in the Semiconductor Physics Group. At Cambridge Drndic worked on quantum transport of coupled gases with Michael Pepper. At Harvard University she was a member of Phi Beta Kappa and graduated summa cum laude. Drndic was awarded a Clare Booth Luce Fellowship, the Harold T. White Prize for Excellence in Teaching and the Robbins Prize from Harvard University. She remained there for her doctoral studies, working with Robert Westervelt on microelectromagnets for cold-atom experiments. She before joining the Massachusetts Institute of Technology as a Pappalardo Fellow. As a postdoctoral researcher Drndic worked on electron transport in cadmium selenide nanocrystals. She worked alongside Marc A. Kastner and Moungi Bawendi on novel spectroscopies.

== Research and career ==
In 2003 Drndic joined the University of Pennsylvania. She was awarded an American Chemical Society Petroleum Research Fund Award in 2004, and has since been supported by the National Science Foundation, Alfred P. Sloan Foundation and DARPA. In 2005 Drndic was awarded a Presidential Early Career Award for Scientists and Engineers.

Her work considers low-dimensional materials including nanowires, nanocrystals and biomaterials. Drndic uses electron beams to image and shape materials. In particular, Drndic works on two-dimensional nanopores, which are nanoscale size holes that can be used to detect single molecules. They are typically used for biomolecular analysis, but were unable to sequence DNA. Drndic demonstrated it is possible to use light to control the shape of nanopores, indicating it may be possible to fabricate them using light. By removing individual atoms from the nanopores using ion beams, Drndic demonstrated that the nanopores can also be used in water desalination. She has shown that nanopores can be integrated with field-effect transistors to sense nearby ionic and electrical currents. They can also provide information on the physical and chemical properties of biomolecules including DNA and proteins.

=== Selected publications ===
Her publications include;

- Drndic, Marija (2010). "DNA translocation through graphene nanopores". Nano Letters. 10 (8): 2915–2921. Bibcode:2010NanoL..10.2915M. doi:10.1021/nl101046t. PMID 20698604.
- Drndic, Marija (2010). "Rapid electronic detection of probe-specific microRNAs using thin nanopore sensors". Nature Nanotechnology. 5 (11): 807–814. Bibcode:2010NatNa...5..807W. doi:10.1038/nnano.2010.202. PMID 20972437.
- Drndic, Marija (2008). "Electron beam nanosculpting of suspended graphene sheets". Applied Physics Letters. 93 (11) 113107. arXiv:0808.2974. Bibcode:2008ApPhL..93k3107F. doi:10.1063/1.2980518. S2CID 119272690. Archived from the original on May 31, 2020.

Drndic holds several patents for electronic devices and thin film structures.
