= Coulomb blockade =

Term in mesoscopic physics

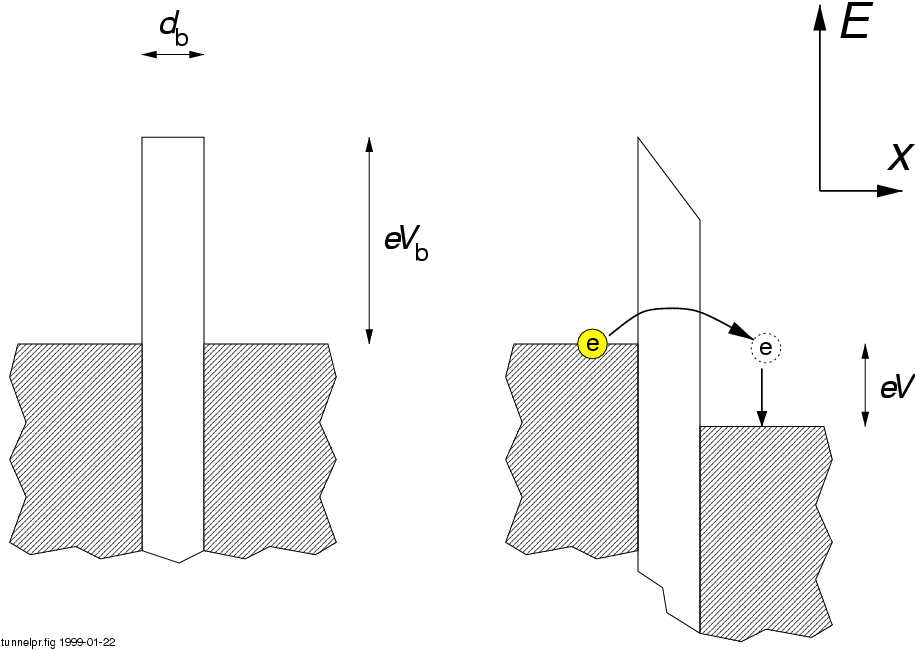
Schematic representation (similar to band diagram) of an electron tunnelling through a barrier

In mesoscopic physics, a Coulomb blockade (CB), named after Charles-Augustin de Coulomb's electrical force, is the decrease in electrical conductance at small bias voltages of a small electronic device comprising at least one low-capacitance tunnel junction. Because of the CB, the conductance of a device may not be constant at low bias voltages, but disappear for biases under a certain threshold, i.e. no current flows.

Coulomb blockade can be observed by making a device very small, like a quantum dot. When the device is small enough, electrons inside the device will create a strong Coulomb repulsion preventing other electrons to flow. Thus, the device will no longer follow Ohm's law and the current-voltage relation of the Coulomb blockade looks like a staircase.

Even though the Coulomb blockade can be used to demonstrate the quantization of the electric charge, it remains a classical effect and its main description does not require quantum mechanics. However, when few electrons are involved and an external static magnetic field is applied, Coulomb blockade provides the ground for a spin blockade (like Pauli spin blockade) and valley blockade, which include quantum mechanical effects due to spin and orbital interactions respectively between the electrons.

The devices can comprise either metallic or superconducting electrodes. If the electrodes are superconducting, Cooper pairs (with a charge of minus two elementary charges $-2e$) carry the current. In the case that the electrodes are metallic or normal-conducting, i.e. neither superconducting nor semiconducting, electrons (with a charge of $-e$) carry the current.

== In a tunnel junction ==
The following section is for the case of tunnel junctions with an insulating barrier between two normal conducting electrodes (NIN junctions).

The tunnel junction is, in its simplest form, a thin insulating barrier between two conducting electrodes. According to the laws of classical electrodynamics, no current can flow through an insulating barrier. According to the laws of quantum mechanics, however, there is a nonvanishing (larger than zero) probability for an electron on one side of the barrier to reach the other side (see quantum tunnelling). When a bias voltage is applied, this means that there will be a current, and, neglecting additional effects, the tunnelling current will be proportional to the bias voltage. In electrical terms, the tunnel junction behaves as a resistor with a constant resistance, also known as an ohmic resistor. The resistance depends exponentially on the barrier thickness. Typically, the barrier thickness is on the order of one to several nanometers.

An arrangement of two conductors with an insulating layer in between not only has a resistance, but also a finite capacitance. The insulator is also called dielectric in this context, the tunnel junction behaves as a capacitor.

Due to the discreteness of electrical charge, current through a tunnel junction is a series of events in which exactly one electron passes (tunnels) through the tunnel barrier (we neglect cotunneling, in which two electrons tunnel simultaneously). The tunnel junction capacitor is charged with one elementary charge by the tunnelling electron, causing a voltage build up $U=e/C$, where $C$ is the capacitance of the junction. If the capacitance is very small, the voltage build up can be large enough to prevent another electron from tunnelling. The electric current is then suppressed at low bias voltages and the resistance of the device is no longer constant. The increase of the differential resistance around zero bias is called the Coulomb blockade.

== Observation ==
In order for the Coulomb blockade to be observable, the temperature has to be low enough so that the characteristic charging energy (the energy that is required to charge the junction with one elementary charge) is larger than the thermal energy of the charge carriers. In the past, for capacitances above 1 femtofarad (10^{−15} farad), this implied that the temperature has to be below about 1 kelvin. This temperature range is routinely reached for example by helium-3 refrigerators. Thanks to small-sized quantum dots of only few nanometers, Coulomb blockade has been observed next above liquid helium temperature, up to room temperature.

To make a tunnel junction in plate condenser geometry with a capacitance of 1 femtofarad, using an oxide layer of electric permittivity 10 and thickness one nanometer, one has to create electrodes with dimensions of approximately 100 by 100 nanometers. This range of dimensions is routinely reached for example by electron beam lithography and appropriate pattern transfer technologies, like the Niemeyer–Dolan technique, also known as shadow evaporation technique. The integration of quantum dot fabrication with standard industrial technology has been achieved for silicon. CMOS process for obtaining massive production of single electron quantum dot transistors with channel size down to 20 nm x 20 nm has been implemented.

== Single-electron transistor ==
Schematic of a single-electron transistor.

Left to right: energy levels of source, island and drain in a single-electron transistor for the blocking state (upper part) and transmitting state (lower part).

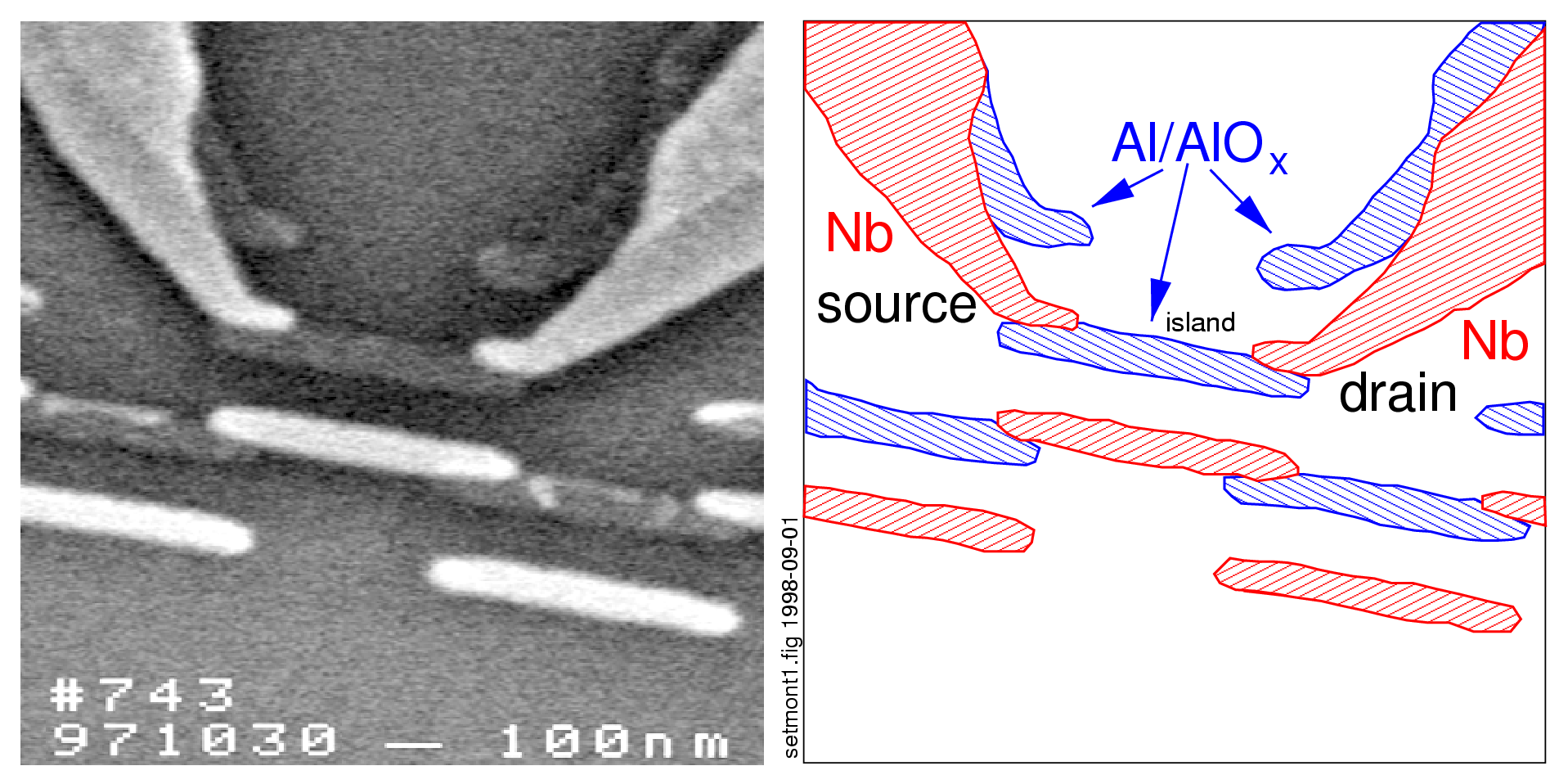
Single-electron transistor with niobium leads and aluminium island.

The simplest device in which the effect of Coulomb blockade can be observed is the so-called single-electron transistor. It consists of two electrodes known as the drain and the source, connected through tunnel junctions to one common electrode with a low self-capacitance, known as the island. The electrical potential of the island can be tuned by a third electrode, known as the gate, which is capacitively coupled to the island.

In the blocking state no accessible energy levels are within tunneling range of an electron (in red) on the source contact. All energy levels on the island electrode with lower energies are occupied.

When a positive voltage is applied to the gate electrode the energy levels of the island electrode are lowered. The electron (green 1.) can tunnel onto the island (2.), occupying a previously vacant energy level. From there it can tunnel onto the drain electrode (3.) where it inelastically scatters and reaches the drain electrode Fermi level (4.).

The energy levels of the island electrode are evenly spaced with a separation of $\Delta E.$ This gives rise to a self-capacitance $C$ of the island, defined as

$$C=\frac{e^2}{\Delta E}.$$

To achieve the Coulomb blockade, three criteria have to be met:

1. The bias voltage must be lower than the elementary charge divided by the self-capacitance of the island: $V_\text{bias} < \frac{e}{C}$ ;
2. The thermal energy in the source contact plus the thermal energy in the island, i.e. $k_{\rm B}T,$ must be below the charging energy: $k_{\rm B}T < \frac{e^2}{2C},$ or else the electron will be able to pass the QD via thermal excitation; and
3. The tunneling resistance, $R_{\rm t},$ should be greater than $\frac{h}{e^2},$ which is derived from Heisenberg's uncertainty principle.

== Coulomb blockade thermometer ==
A typical Coulomb blockade thermometer (CBT) is made from an array of metallic islands, connected to each other through a thin insulating layer. A tunnel junction forms between the islands, and as voltage is applied, electrons may tunnel across this junction. The tunneling rates and hence the conductance vary according to the charging energy of the islands as well as the thermal energy of the system.

Coulomb blockade thermometer is a primary thermometer based on electric conductance characteristics of tunnel junction arrays. The parameter V_{½} = 5.439 Nk_{B}T/e, the full width at half minimum of the measured differential conductance dip over an array of N junctions together with the physical constants provide the absolute temperature.

== Ionic Coulomb blockade ==
Ionic Coulomb blockade (ICB) is the special case of CB, appearing in the electro-diffusive transport of charged ions through sub-nanometer artificial nanopores or biological ion channels. ICB is widely similar to its electronic counterpart in quantum dots,^{[1]} but presents some specific features defined by possibly different valence z of charge carriers (permeating ions vs electrons) and by the different origin of transport engine (classical electrodiffusion vs quantum tunnelling).

In the case of ICB, Coulomb gap $\Delta E$ is defined by dielectric self-energy of incoming ion inside the pore/channel
$$\Delta E=\frac {z^2e^2}{2C}$$
and hence $\Delta E$ depends on ion valence z. ICB appears strong $(\Delta E\gg k_{\rm B}T)$, even at the room temperature, for ions with $z>=2$, e.g. for $\ce{Ca^2+}$ ions.

ICB has been recently experimentally observed in sub-nanometer $\ce{MoS2}$ pores.

In biological ion channels ICB typically manifests itself in such valence selectivity phenomena as $\text{Ca}^{2+}$ conduction bands (vs fixed charge $Q_{\rm f}$) and concentration-dependent divalent blockade of sodium current.

== See also ==
- Quantisation of charge
- Elementary charge
