= Graphene antenna =

A graphene antenna is a high-frequency antenna based on graphene, a one atom thick two dimensional carbon crystal, designed to enhance radio communications. The unique structure of graphene would enable these enhancements. Ultimately, the choice of graphene for the basis of this nano antenna was due to the behavior of electrons.

== Antenna ==
It would be unfeasible to simply reduce traditional metallic antennas to nano sizes, because they would require tremendously high frequencies to operate. Consequently, it would require a lot of power to operate them. Furthermore, electrons in these traditional metals are not very mobile at nano sizes and the necessary electromagnetic waves would not form. However, these limitations would not be an issue with graphene's unique capabilities. A flake of graphene has the potential to hold a series of metal electrodes. Consequently, it would be possible to develop an antenna from this material.

=== Electron behavior ===
Graphene has a unique structure, wherein, electrons are able to move with minimal resistance. This enables electricity to move at a much faster speed than in metal, which is used for current antennas. Furthermore, as the electrons oscillate, they create an electromagnetic wave atop the graphene layer, referred to as the surface plasmon polariton wave. This would enable the antenna to operate at the lower end of the terahertz frequency, which would be more efficient than the current copper based antennas. Ultimately, researchers envision that graphene will be able to break through the limitations of current antennas.

=== Properties ===
It has been estimated that speeds of up to terabits per second can be achieved using such a device. Traditional antennas would require very high frequencies to operate at nano scales, making it an unfeasible option. However, the unique slower movement of electrons in graphene would enable it to operate at lower frequencies making it a feasible option for a nano sized antenna.

== Projects ==
=== Oak Ridge National Laboratory ===
Researchers from the Department of Energy's Oak Ridge National Laboratory (ORNL) have discovered a unique way to create an atomic antenna. Two sheets of graphene can be connected by a silicon wire that is approximately 0.1 nanometer in diameter. This is approximately 100 times smaller than current metal based wires, which can only be reduced to 50 nanometers. This silicon wire however, is a plasmotic device, which would enable the formation of surface plasmon polariton waves required to operate this nano antenna.

=== Samsung ===
Samsung has funded $120,000 for research into the graphene antenna to a team of researchers from the Georgia Institute of Technology and the Polytechnic University of Catalonia. Their research has shown that graphene is a feasible material to make nano antennas with. They have simulated how the electrons would behave, and have confirmed that surface plasmon polariton waves should form. This wave is essential for the graphene antenna to operate at the low end of the terahertz range, making it more efficient than traditional antenna designs. Researchers are currently working on implementing their research, and finding a way to propagate the electromagnetic waves necessary to operate the antenna. Their findings were published in the IEEE Journal on Selected Areas in Communications.

=== University of Manchester ===
A collaboration between the University of Manchester and an industrial partner developed a new way to manufacture graphene antennas for radio-frequency identification. The antennas are paper-based, flexible and environmentally friendly. Their findings were published in Applied Physics Letters and are being commercialised by Graphene Security.

== See also ==
- Ian F. Akyildiz
- Metal-insulator-graphene (MIG)
- Nanoelectronics
- Nanowire
- Optical rectenna
