= Source measure unit =

Power supply and voltage/current measurement unit

A source measure unit (SMU) is a type of electronic test equipment which can source voltage and current and measure them as it does so.

== Overview ==
The source measure unit (SMU), or source-measurement unit, is an electronic instrument that is capable of both sourcing and measuring at the same time. It can precisely force voltage or current and simultaneously measure precise voltage and/or current.

An SMU instrument can source and sink power in all four quadrants.

SMUs are used for test applications requiring high accuracy, high resolution and measurement flexibility. Such applications include I-V characterizing and testing semiconductors and other non-linear devices and materials, where sourcing voltage and current source span across both positive and negative values. To accomplish this, SMUs have four-quadrant outputs. For characterization purposes SMUs are bench instruments similar to a curve tracer. They are also commonly used in automatic test equipment and usually are equipped with an interface such as GPIB or USB to enable connection to a computer.

== History ==
Semiconductor characterization led to the development of source measure units. The HP4145A semiconductor parameter analyzer introduced in 1982 was capable of a complete DC characterization of semiconductor devices and materials. It consisted of four independently controlled source monitor units (the precursor to source measure units) enclosed in a mainframe.

The Keithley 236 introduced in 1989 was the first stand-alone SMU and allowed system builders to integrate one or more SMUs with a separate PC control. Over time stand-alone SMUs have evolved to offer a broader range of current, voltage, power level and price points for applications beyond semiconductor characterization. Smaller form factors made possible through the use of modern computing technologies have allowed system builders to integrate SMUs into rack and stack systems for larger scale production test applications.

== Operation ==
A SMU integrates a highly stable DC power source, as a constant current source or as a constant voltage source, and a high precision multimeter.

It typically has four terminals, two for source and measurement and two more for kelvin, or remote sense, connection. Power is simultaneously sourced (positive) or sinked (negative) to a pair of terminals at the same time as measuring the current or voltage across those terminals is done.

=== SMU vs. power supply ===
A power supply is mainly intended to provide appropriate power for a particular application. Due to this, the majority of power-supplies are one-quadrant (source only, with fixed polarity), and in most cases constant-voltage operation. Bench power supplies might add constant-current operation as well as providing limited measurement capabilities, but these are in many cases still one-quadrant only and with margins of errors acceptable for coarse lab-work.

Some high-end lab power-supplies will have two- or four-quadrant operation (source and sink, with fixed or dual polarity), which is an essential feature of a SMU. However, many of these still have a main focus on providing power to an application, where eventual measurement capabilities has secondary priority. These may have advanced capabilities of controlling the power output, but might lack things like specialized test-modes or monitoring-options tailored for precise and easy power-characterization. This particular class of power-supplies can be regarded as the predecessor for the SMU, where the SMU differs in that it adds features particularly aimed towards characterization.

=== SMU vs. DMM ===
The built-in sourcing capabilities of an SMU work with the instrument's measurement capabilities to reduce measurement uncertainty and support low current and more flexible resistance measurements. In voltage measurements system-level leakage can be suppressed more easily than with separate instruments. In current measurements, the SMU's design reduces voltage burden. For resistance measurements, SMUs provide programmable source values, useful for protecting the device being tested.

== Significant features ==
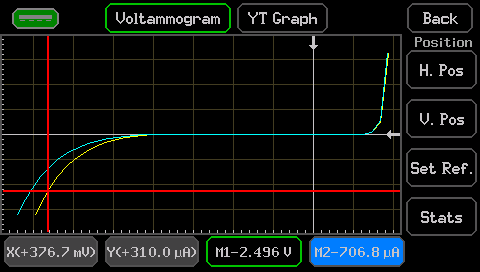
screenshot of the SMU display showing parameters of Zener diode

Notable features of SMUs include the following:

- I and V sweeping—Sweep capabilities offer a way to test devices under a range of conditions with different source, delay and measure characteristics. These can include fixed level, linear/log and pulsed sweeps.
- On-board processor—Some SMUs further improve instrument integration, communication and test time by adding an on-board script processor. User-defined on-board script execution offers capabilities for controlling test sequencing/flow, decision making, and instrument autonomy.
- Contact check—SMUs can verify good connections to the device under test before the test begins. Some of the problems this function can detect include contact fatigue, breakage, contamination, corrosion, loose or broken connections and relay failures.

== See also ==
- Semiconductor curve tracer
- Voltage source
- Current source
- Digital multimeter
- Power supply
- Electrometer
- Electronic load
