= Lambda diode =

An n-channel JFET (top) and a p-channel JFET combine to form a lambda-diode circuit

A lambda diode is an electronic circuit that combines a complementary pair of junction gated field effect transistors into a two-terminal device that exhibits an area of differential negative resistance much like a tunnel diode. The term refers to the shape of the V–I curve of the device, which resembles the Greek letter Λ (lambda).

Lambda diodes work at higher voltage than tunnel diodes. Whereas a typical tunnel diode may exhibit negative differential resistance approximately between 70 mV and 350 mV, this region occurs approximately between 1.5 V and 6 V in a lambda diode due to the higher pinch-off voltages of typical JFET devices. A lambda diode therefore cannot replace a tunnel diode directly.

Moreover, in a tunnel diode the current reaches a minimum of about 20% of the peak current before rising again towards higher voltages. The lambda diode current approaches zero as voltage increases, before rising quickly again at a voltage high enough to cause gate–source Zener breakdown in the FETs.

It is also possible to construct a device similar to a lambda diode by combining an n-channel JFET with a PNP bipolar transistor. A suggested modulatable variant but is a bit more difficult to build uses a PNP based optocoupler and can be tweaked by using its IR diode. This has the advantage that its properties can be fine tuned with a simple bias driver and used for high sensitivity radio applications. Sometimes, a modified open can PNP transistor with IR LED can be used instead.

== Applications ==
Like the tunnel diode, the negative resistance aspect of the lambda diode lends itself naturally to application in oscillator circuits and amplifiers. In addition, bistable circuits such as memory cells have been described.

== Literature ==
- Graf, Rudolf F. (1999). Modern Dictionary of Electronics, 7th ed. Boston [etc.]: Newnes Press. p. 411. ISBN 0-7506-9866-7.
