= Nanoantennas =

Nanoantennas are nanomaterial devices that behave similarly to radio antennas. These devices are tuned to convert freely propagating radiation fields into localized energy via localized electric and magnetic field enhancement effects. Nanoantennas are plasmonic nanostructures with distinct geometries that utilize principles of localized surface plasmon resonance and the high surface area property of nanoparticles to give rise to distinct optical properties and precise control over light-matter interactions.

== History ==
In 1928, Synge proposed the utilization of gold nanoparticles for advanced imaging techniques due to their property of optical radiation concentration. In 1985, Wessel theorized the concept of gold nanoparticles as an antenna, which was later demonstrated by Fischer et al. in 1995 leading to the development of near-field optical microscopy and spectroscopy. In 1972, Bailey introduced the idea of using nanoantennas for photovoltaic applications in solar cells. Today, research focuses on the use of surface plasmon resonance to make these devices more efficient for resonating with selected frequencies, including investigating the fabrication of distinct nanoantenna shapes for higher field enhancement, localized energy, and fluorescence enhancement.

== Function ==
As light waves hit a nanoantenna, the surface electrons oscillate at a matching resonance frequency creating this localized electric field in the hot spot that in turn intensifies the light signal by orders of magnitude.

Light waves interact with the metallic nanoparticles. The free surface electrons of these metal nanostructures oscillate in resonance with propagating light waves via phenomenon known as localized surface plasmon resonance. The oscillations of these electrons at the resonant frequency of the incident light creates a localized electric field enhancement effect in the hot-spot–the gap between the nanoparticles. The incident electromagnetic field from the light, a form of electromagnetic radiation, can be enhanced by up to tens of thousands order of magnitude due to the spatial confinement of the fields within the sub-wavelength gap. The metal nanoparticle surfaces are where the largest local electric field enhancement effects occur. The localized surface plasmon resonance is unique to the geometry, size, and gap-size of the nanoparticles allowing for the tunability of fabricating nanoantennas with sharp, distinct spectral absorption and scattering peaks.

== Molecular Designs and Shapes ==
Nanoantennas are fabricated into various shapes and geometries and allow for tuning of optical properties.

The strong-field confinement and enhancement arise from the designs and nanoscale gaps of these nanomaterials. Optimization of the gap size, antenna size, antenna shape, and array formation allows for further enhancement of the concentrated field and tuning of the spectral response.

=== Nanodimers ===
Nanodimers, also known as dipole dimers, are two metallic nanoparticles spaced apart by a nanometer-scaled size gap. These nanospheres or nanorods behave like nanoantennas in that their surface plasmons resonate at the same frequency of the incoming light and hence allow for light intensification. The resonance of dipole antennas strongly depend on the gap-width, and the surfaces of these nanoparticles can have surface molecules allowing for the binding of target analytes to the surfaces of these nanoantennas.

=== Bowtie Nanoantennas ===
Bowtie antennas are two equilateral triangle-shaped nanoparticles placed tip-to-tip to each other with a nanometer-scale gap between them. They also demonstrate high localized field enhancement due to their gap-widths and the fact that surface electrons oscillate at their sharp tips. Bowtie and dipole nanoantennas with their strong field enhancement properties allow for the ultra-sensitivity in signal detection. Bowtie antennas with large bow angles however can also produce multiple high-order resonances due to the charges oscillating at the other tips and edges of the bowtie.

=== Yagi-Uda Nanoantennas ===
Yagi-Uda nanoantennas are based on the design of the Yagi-Uda radio antennas in which they are composed typically of five nanorods spaced apart on a wavelength scale. Their design allows for the similar specialized function of Yagi-Uda radio antennas in that they can allow for the strong directivity of radiation. One of the nanorods acts as the feeder, one as the reflector, and the rest as directors to allow for the strong directivity of radiation.

=== Spiral Nanoantennas ===
Spiral nanoantennas are another emerging geometry of nanoantennas that research has started to focus on as they allow for the electromagnetic radiation to be intensified and localized to one single point while also allowing for directivity. Spiral nanoantennas also have a specific handedness in their design–the direction of the spiral–which can allow for the absorption of a specific handedness of light and transmission of others. Further research has been conducted on their ability to act as circular polarization light filters and the enhancement of polarized light and thus applications for the detection of chiral molecules.

=== Graphene-based Nanoantennas ===
Another field of nanoantennas that has been investigated is the design of graphene-based nanoantennas. Graphene nanoantennas have surface plasmon polaritons (SPPs), electrons on the confined graphene layer surface, that oscillate as a wave at much lower speeds than free-space light. Hence, graphene nanoantennas resonate at lower frequencies, such as in the Terahertz and infrared frequency ranges, compared to their metallic nanoparticle counterparts. They also display a degree of tunability with their conductivity which impacts how the electrons oscillate, and thus their resonant frequencies can be tuned.

== Fabrication ==
The synthesis of these nanoantennas follow the same procedures as that of specific-shaped nanoparticles, specifically, lithographic techniques: electron beam and focused ion beam lithography.These electron beam lithographic techniques allow for nanometer scale fabrication of nanoantennas and creating specific gap sizes and nanoantenna shapes with resolutions up to 10nm. Field-emission scanning probe lithography is another lithographic technique used to develop the arrays of nanoantennas on a substrate with precision up to 10nm. Electron beam and focused ion beam lithographic techniques have demonstrated to be the most common, though costly, fabrication methods. These techniques plate a metal sample on a substrate and use charged particles to carve precise nanoscale geometries to develop nanoantenna arrays with high precision. Mass fabrication and low-cost techniques to produce nanoantennas are still a challenge for developing technologies with nanoantennas.

== Potential Applications ==
Because of nanoantennas’ abilities to enhance the localized electric field, they have become an emerging technology in bridging the gap between the near-field emitter energy and far-field radiation. They allow for the enhancement of the fluorescence, Raman scattering, and other forms of optical or Infrared region responses by orders of magnitude due to the localized field enhancement. The array and set pattern of nanoantennas also allow for localizing the sensing area to the gaps between nanoantennas making signal detection easier.

The scattered raman signals of target analytes can be reproduced and intensified by the localized electric field enhancement property of nanoantennas.

=== Surface Enhanced Raman Spectroscopy ===
The electromagnetic field enhancement effects that arise from the localized surface plasmon resonance of the light-matter interactions with the nanoantennas allows for applications in surface-enhanced Raman spectroscopy (SERS). The field enhancement allows for the amplification of the signal of the scattered light with ultrasensitivity down to a single molecule through remission of the vibrational signals at magnified intensities by factors of tens to tens of thousands. Detection systems can also consist of groups of nanoantennas with specific designs tailored to the detection and amplification of the Raman signals in optical and infrared regions produced by a collection of specific analytes.

=== Biosensors ===
Another principal application of nanomaterials that have been investigated is the label-free ultrasensitive sensing of biomolecules, including proteins, mRNAs, toxic gases, and other target biological molecules. Nanoantennas also allow for the enhancement of the fluorescence of an emitter by orders of magnitude. Nanoantennas, as biosensors, detect biomolecules through detection of resonant wavelength shifts that originate from the presence of target analytes affecting the chemical environment of the nanostructures. The presence of molecules cause adsorbate-induced refractive index changes in the environment, which creates resonant wavelength shifts that can be detected by nanoantennas. Decreasing the gap between nanoantennas also allows for increased detection and sensitivity enhancement as the analyte is confined to a tighter space, creating stronger resonance shifts as it alters the optical properties of the nanoantennas. Research has focused on developing nanoparticles with surface antibodies or surface molecules to bind to and detect proteins and mRNAs for research into biomedicine, cancer, and protein-related diseases. The application of nanoantennas as biosensors has also been used to explore real-time binding kinetics along with ultrasensitive detection.

A gold bowtie nanoantenna device contains the gold nanoparticles coated onto a SiO_{2} substrate layer, which is on top of a highly resistive Silicon layer and thin gold film layer. The device follows a metal-insulator-metal diode setup to allow for solar energy harvesting.

=== Photovoltaics and Solar Cells ===
Energy harvesting from the localized intense energy hot spots has been another principal field of application with research for nanoantennas in solar cell and photovoltaic technology developments. These devices have been designed to improve radiation absorption for solar energy harvest. For example, some have been designed to have a higher absorption response in the Infrared-region. They can enhance and improve the absorption of a photon into a semiconductor. “Hot electrons” in the nanoantennas can absorb enough energy via the intense localized energy to cross into a semiconductor substrate, thus producing an alternating current as electrons can also move back and forth between semiconductor and nanoantennas. An array of nanoantennas are attached to a rectifier creating a rectenna set up to convert the alternating current to a direct power current. Usually, these rectifiers are composed of metal-insulator-metal diodes which create asymmetric characteristics to allow for the tunneling of energized electrons to tunnel to the other side but not backwards, hence creating a direct current.
