= Metal–insulator–metal diode =

Metal–insulator–metal (MIM) diode is a type of nonlinear device very similar to a semiconductor diode and capable of very fast operation. Depending on the geometry and the material used for fabrication, the operation mechanisms are governed either by quantum tunnelling or thermal activation.

In 1948, Torrey et al. stated that "It should be possible to make metal–insulator–metal rectifiers with much smaller spreading resistances than metal–semiconductor rectifiers have, consequently giving greater rectification efficiency at high frequencies." But due to fabrication difficulties, two decades passed before the first device could be successfully created. Some of the first MIM diodes to be fabricated came from Bell Labs in the late 1960s and early 1970s Brinkman et al. demonstrated the first zero-bias MIM tunneling diode with significant responsivity. When they are using tunneling transport, the MIM diode can be very fast. As soon as 1974, this diode was reportedly used as a mixer at 88 THz in a setup of the National Institute of Standards and Technology. Thanks to recent researches the zero-bias responsivity of the MIM diode (15 A/W) is now very close to the one of Schottky diode (19.4 A/W).

Today MIM diode is the cornerstone of the ongoing nantenna developments. They are also used as thin-film diode by the flat-panel display manufacturers.

In contrast to MIM diodes, metal–insulator–insulator–metal (MIIM) diodes have two insulator layers.

== See also ==
- Nantenna
- Resonant tunnelling diode
- Scanning tunneling microscope
- superconductor–insulator–superconductor tunnel junction
- Thin-film diode
- Tunnel diode
- Tunnel junction
