= The Forests Dialogue =

Sustainable land use organization

- Founded: 1999
- Purpose: conservation of forests, sustainable land use, sustainable resource use
- Location: New Haven, United States
- Region served: Worldwide
- Method: Facilitation of dialogues
- Website: The Forests Dialogue

The Forests Dialogue (TFD) is an autonomous, unincorporated organization hosted by Yale University School of Forestry and Environmental Studies. TFD was created in 1998 to provide international leaders in the forest sector with an ongoing, multi-stakeholder dialogue (MSD) platform and process focused on developing mutual trust, shared understanding, and collaborative solutions to challenges in achieving sustainable forest management and forest conservation around the world.

== Purpose and mission ==
TFD's stated purpose is to contribute to sustainable land and resource use, the conservation and sustainable management of forests, and improved livelihoods by helping people engage and explore difficult issues, find collaborative solutions, and make positive changes.

TFD's mission is to pursue their purpose through constructive dialogue processes among all key stakeholders, based on mutual trust, enhanced understanding and commitment to change. TFD's dialogues are reportedly designed to build relationships and to spur collaborative action on the highest priority issues facing the world's forests.

== Process ==
Each TFD Dialogue consists of three phases where in the initiating phase the key issues are identified, and existing perspectives and information are shared. In the second phase consensus on the main challenges surrounding the key issues is reached and in the final stage TFD actively promotes and facilitates stakeholder actions that lead to collaborative solutions with impact on policy and on the ground. As part of this process, TFD leads 2–4 day multi-stakeholder dialogues that usually have a field component with visits to sites under dispute followed by a discussion component in a nearby major city.

== Current initiatives (as of 2012) ==
- Food, Fuel, Fiber and Forests (4Fs)
- Free, Prior and Informed Consent (FPIC)
- Genetically Modified Trees
- REDD Readiness
- Investing in Locally Controlled Forests

== Past initiatives ==
- Commercial Forestry and Poverty Reduction
- Intensively Managed Planted Forests
- Forests and Biodiversity Conservation
- Illegal Logging and Forest Governance
- Forest Certification

Past initiatives have also focused on forests and climate change among others.

== Governance ==
TFD is governed by a steering committee that consists of up to 25 members and is led by two co-leaders. The committee comprises a group of individuals who have been invited to join based on their leadership roles in the forest sector, or other related sectors. Serving three-year terms, which can be renewed once, committee members are chosen for their abilities to help build trust and a shared understanding within a collaborative environment. According to TFD, the relatively large size of the committee is to enable diverse stakeholders and forest issues to be reflected. The committee is supported by an executive team, set up in August 2010 to take forward the primary decisions of the committee and work more closely with TFD's secretariat. The executive team consists of five individuals: the steering committee's two current leaders, plus either the two previous or two future co-leaders, and the executive director.

== Secretariat ==
TFD's secretariat is led by an executive director and employs a small full-time staff located in New Haven, Connecticut, US.

== See also ==
- Forest Management
