= Tunnel diode =

Diode that works using quantum tunneling

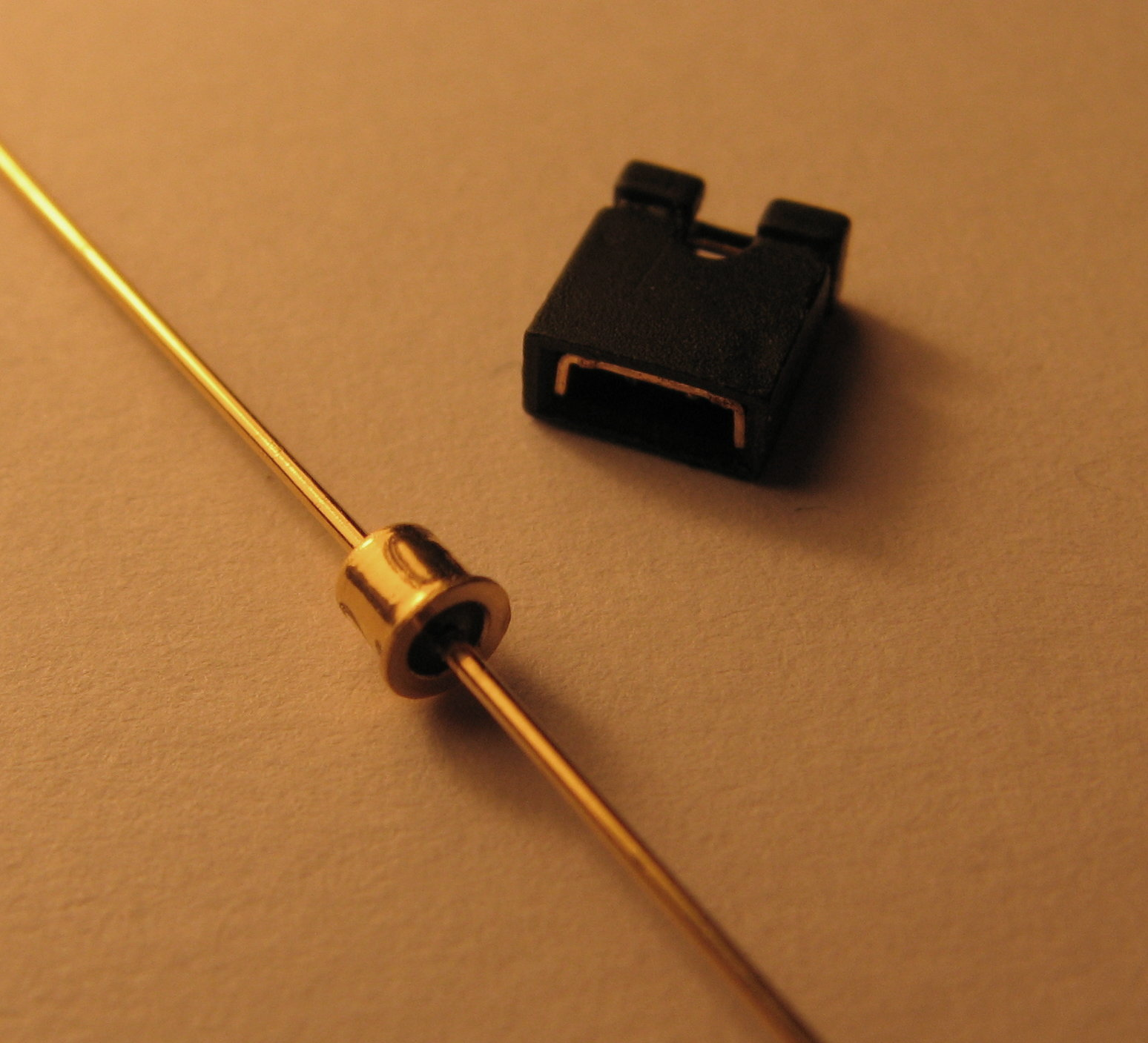
- 1N3716 tunnel diode (with 0.1" jumper for scale)
- Component type: Active
- Working principle: Quantum tunneling
- Inventor: Leo Esaki; Yuriko Kurose
- Invention year: 1957
- First produced: 1957
- First produced by: Sony
- Pin names: Anode and cathode

Electronic symbol

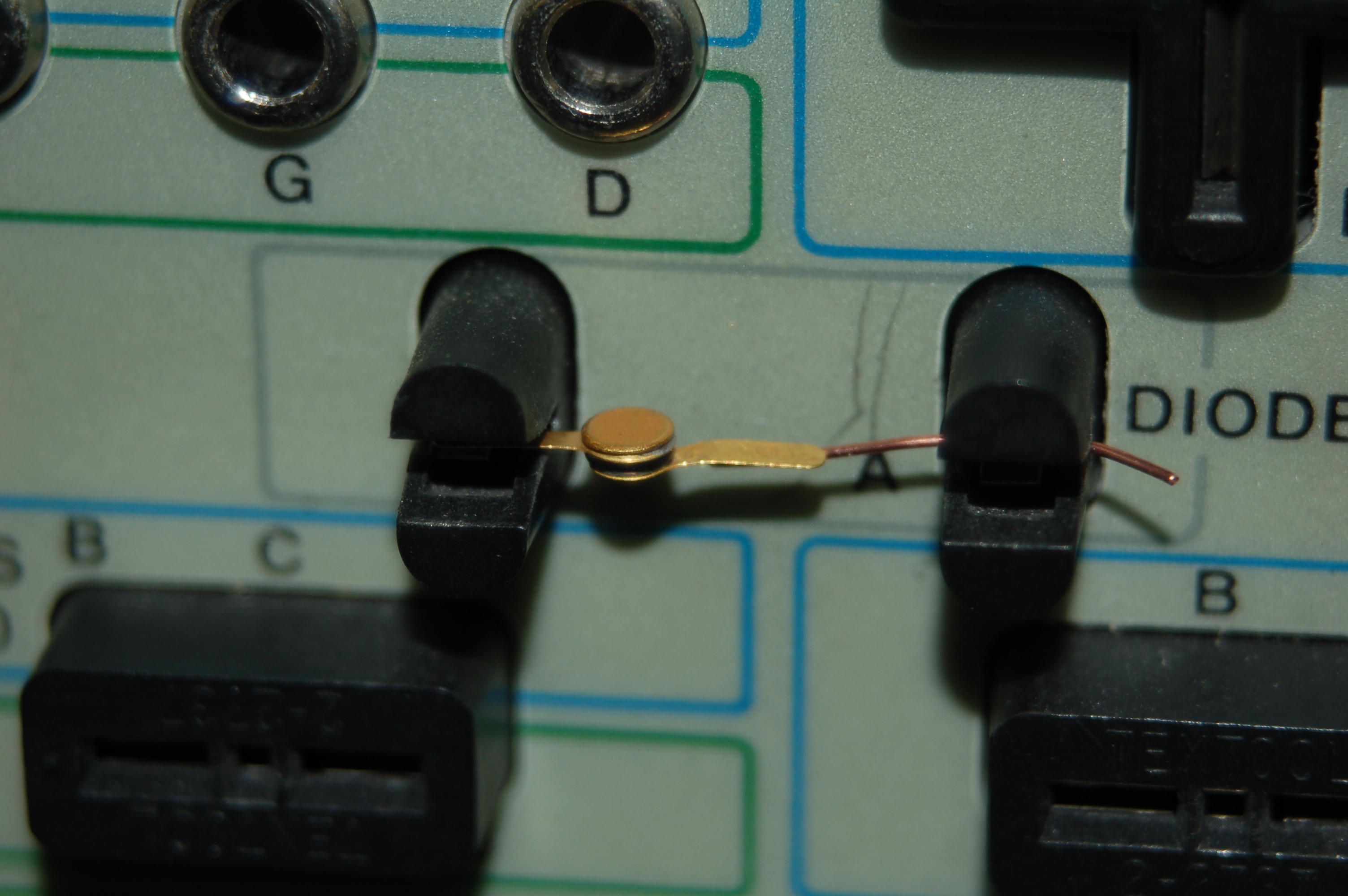
10 mA germanium tunnel diode mounted in test fixture of Tektronix 571 curve tracer

A tunnel diode or Esaki diode is a type of semiconductor diode that has effectively "negative resistance" due to the quantum mechanical effect called tunneling. It was invented in August 1957 by Leo Esaki and Yuriko Kurose when working at Tokyo Tsushin Kogyo, now known as Sony. In 1973, Esaki received the Nobel Prize in Physics for experimental demonstration of the electron tunneling effect in semiconductors. Robert Noyce independently devised the idea of a tunnel diode while working for William Shockley, but was discouraged from pursuing it. Tunnel diodes were first manufactured by Sony in 1957, followed by General Electric and other companies from about 1960, and are still made in low volume today.

Tunnel diodes have a heavily doped PN junction that is about 10 nm (100 Å) wide. The heavy doping results in a broken band gap, where conduction band electron states on the N-side are more or less aligned with valence band hole states on the P-side. They are usually made from germanium, but can also be made from gallium arsenide, gallium antimonide (GaSb) and silicon materials.

== Uses ==
The negative differential resistance in part of their operating range allows them to function as oscillators and amplifiers, and in switching circuits using hysteresis. They are also used as frequency converters and detectors. Their low capacitance allows them to function at microwave frequencies, far above the range of ordinary diodes and transistors.

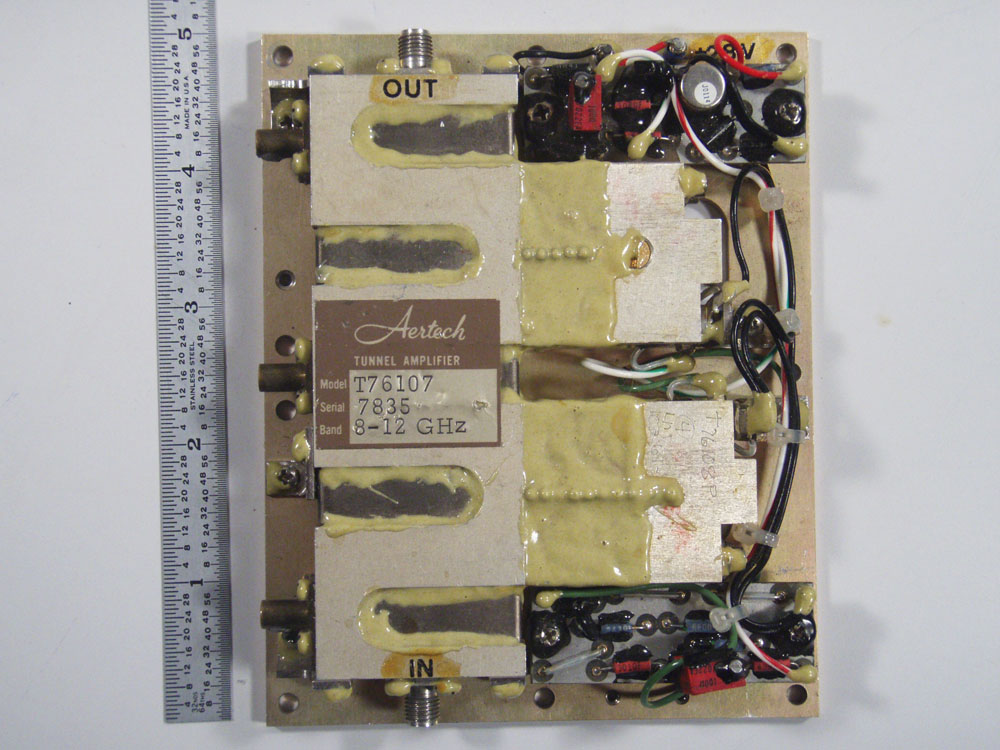
8–12 GHz tunnel diode amplifier, circa 1970

Due to their low output power, tunnel diodes are not widely used. Their radio frequency output is limited to a few hundred milliwatts, due to their small voltage swing. In recent years, new devices that use the tunneling mechanism have been developed. The resonant-tunneling diode (RTD) has achieved some of the highest frequencies of any solid-state oscillator.

Another type of tunnel diode is a metal-insulator-insulator-metal (MIIM) diode, where an additional insulator layer allows "step tunneling" for more precise control of the diode. There is also a metal-insulator-metal (MIM) diode, but due to inherent sensitivities, its present application appears to be limited to research environments.

== Forward bias operation ==
Under normal forward bias operation, as voltage begins to increase, electrons at first tunnel through the very narrow P-N junction barrier and fill electron states in the conduction band on the N-side which become aligned with empty valence band hole states on the P-side of the P-N junction. As voltage increases further, these states become increasingly misaligned, and the current drops. This is called negative differential resistance because current decreases with increasing voltage. As voltage increases beyond a fixed transition point, the diode begins to operate as a normal diode, where electrons travel by conduction across the P-N junction, and no longer by tunneling through the P–N junction barrier. The most important operating region for a tunnel diode is the "negative resistance" region. Its graph is different from a normal P-N junction diode.

== Reverse bias operation ==
I vs. V curve similar to a tunnel diode characteristic curve. It has "negative" differential resistance in the shaded voltage region, between V_{1} and V_{2}.

When used in the reverse direction, tunnel diodes are called back diodes (or backward diodes) and can act as fast rectifiers with zero offset voltage and extreme linearity for power signals (they have an accurate square law characteristic in the reverse direction). Under reverse bias, filled states on the P-side become increasingly aligned with empty states on the N-side, and electrons now tunnel through the P-N junction barrier in reverse direction.

== Technical comparisons ==
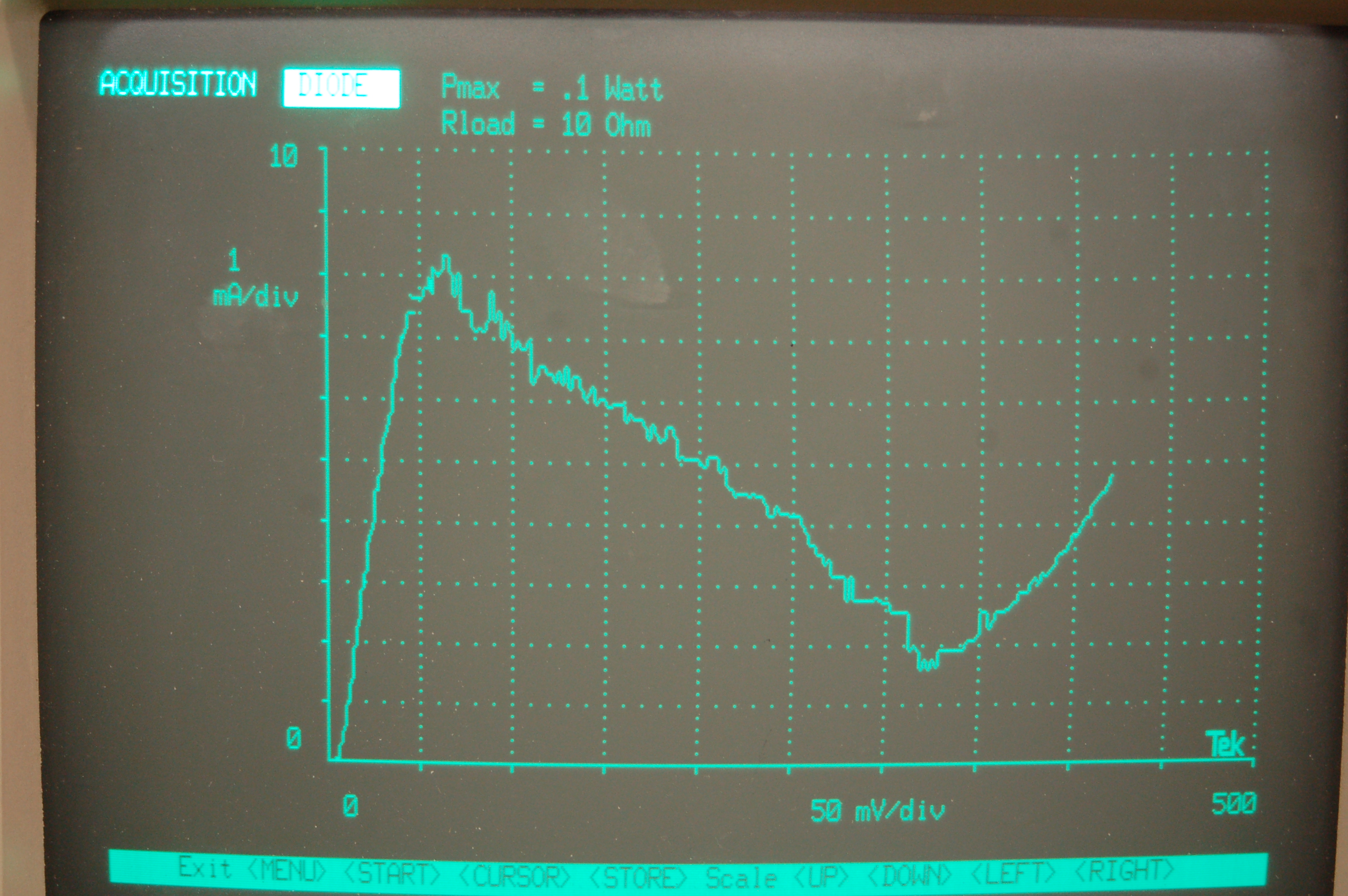
I vs. V curve of 10 mA germanium tunnel diode, taken on a Tektronix model 571 curve tracer.

In a conventional semiconductor diode, conduction takes place while the P-N junction is forward biased and blocks current flow when the junction is reverse biased. This occurs up to a point known as the "reverse breakdown voltage" at which point conduction begins (often accompanied by destruction of the device). In the tunnel diode, the dopant concentrations in the P and N layers are increased to a level such that the reverse breakdown voltage becomes zero and the diode conducts in the reverse direction. However, when forward-biased, an effect occurs called quantum mechanical tunneling which gives rise to a region in its voltage vs. current behavior where an increase in forward voltage is accompanied by a decrease in forward current. This "negative resistance" region can be exploited in a solid state version of the dynatron oscillator which normally uses a tetrode thermionic valve (vacuum tube).

== Applications ==
The tunnel diode showed great promise as an oscillator and high-frequency threshold (trigger) device since it operated at frequencies far greater than the tetrode could: well into the microwave bands. Applications of tunnel diodes included local oscillators for UHF television tuners, trigger circuits in oscilloscopes, high-speed counter circuits, and very fast-rise time pulse generator circuits. In 1977, the Intelsat V satellite receiver used a microstrip tunnel diode amplifier (TDA) front-end in the 14–15.5 GHz frequency band. Such amplifiers were considered state-of-the-art, with better performance at high frequencies than any transistor-based front end. The tunnel diode can also be used as a low-noise microwave amplifier. Since its discovery, more conventional semiconductor devices have surpassed its performance using conventional oscillator techniques. For many purposes, a three-terminal device, such as a field-effect transistor, is more flexible than a device with only two terminals. Practical tunnel diodes operate at a few milliamperes and a few tenths of a volt, making them low-power devices. The Gunn diode has similar high frequency capability and can handle more power.

Tunnel diodes are also more resistant to ionizing radiation than other diodes. This makes them well suited to higher radiation environments such as those found in space.

=== SAW-stabilized oscillators ===
The free-running frequency of a tunnel-diode oscillator built around an LC tank drifts with bias voltage, temperature and load, because the tank's quality factor is low. To improve stability the tank can be replaced by, or coupled to, a high-Q resonator. Quartz-crystal-controlled tunnel-diode oscillators for low-power short-range transmitters were described in electronics handbooks by 1964, and highly stable designs were built for instrumentation; Van Degrift reported a tunnel-diode oscillator with part-per-billion resolution at cryogenic temperatures in 1975.

A higher-frequency form of the same principle replaces the LC tank with a surface acoustic wave (SAW) resonator, whose quality factor (well above 1000) and lithographically defined frequency give considerably better stability than a lumped tank. Oscillators combining a tunnel diode with a SAW resonator were reported in the Soviet radio-engineering literature between 1978 and 1984. Gurevich and co-workers described a discretely tunable oscillator stabilised by a SAW resonator in 1978, Rodionov and Sandler analysed the frequency stability of a SAW-resonator parametric oscillator in 1983, and in 1984 Kmita, Kundin and Maltsev reported a tunnel-diode oscillator stabilised by a SAW resonator operating at a parallel-resonance frequency of 78.901 MHz, whose fractional frequency instability did not exceed 2×10^{−4} over a bias-voltage range of 0.226–0.372 V.

=== Longevity ===
Tunnel diodes are susceptible to damage by overheating, and thus special care is needed when soldering them.

Tunnel diodes are notable for their longevity, with devices made in the 1960s still functioning. Writing in Nature, Esaki and coauthors state that semiconductor devices in general are extremely stable, and suggest that their shelf life should be "infinite" if kept at room temperature. They go on to report that a small-scale test of 50 year-old devices revealed a "gratifying confirmation of the diode's longevity". As noticed on some samples of Esaki diodes, the gold-plated iron pins can in fact corrode and short out to the case. This can usually be diagnosed and treated with simple peroxide / vinegar technique normally used for repairing phone PCBs and the diode inside normally still works.

Surplus Russian components are also reliable and often can be purchased for a few pence, despite original cost being in the £30–50 range. The units typically sold are GaAs based and have a I_{pk}/I_{v} ratio of 5:1 at around 1–20 mA I_{pk}, and so should be protected against overcurrent.

== See also ==
- Avalanche diode
- Gunn diode
- IMPATT diode
- Lambda diode
- Resonant-tunneling diode
- Tunnel junction
- Zener diode
