= Marc A. Kastner =

American physicist

- Born: November 20, 1945 (age 80); Toronto, Ontario, Canada
- Citizenship: United States
- Education: University of Chicago
- Known for: Single-electron transistor
- Awards: David Adler Lectureship Award (1995); Oliver E. Buckley Condensed Matter Prize (2000); National Academy of Sciences (2008)
- Scientific career
- Fields: Physicist
- Workplaces: Massachusetts Institute of Technology

Marc A. Kastner (born November 20, 1945) is an American physicist and Donner Professor of Science and the former dean of the School of Science at the Massachusetts Institute of Technology. Currently he is president of the Science Philanthropy Alliance.

== Early years ==
Kastner was born in Toronto, Ontario, on November 20, 1945. He completed his B.S. in chemistry in 1967, M.S. in 1969 and Ph.D. in physics in 1972 from the University of Chicago.

== Academic career ==
Kastner was a Harvard Research Fellow from 1972 to 1973. He joined the faculty of the Massachusetts Institute of Technology in 1973. He became Donner Professor of Science at MIT in 1989. He was appointed department head in February 1998. He served as the dean of the School of Science at MIT from 2007 to 2013, when he was nominated by President Barack Obama to become head of the Office of Science in the Department of Energy. His nomination was caught up in politics between the President and Congress, and he withdrew his name to become president of the Science Philanthropy Alliance in 2014. Kastner retired from the Alliance in 2020.

== Research ==
Kastner was a researcher on amorphous semiconductors. His early research focused on the relationship between chemical bonding and the electronic structure of defects in glasses.

In 1990, his group at MIT discovered the single-electron transistor. It is a device in which electrostatic fields confine electrons to a small region of space inside a semiconductor. Single-electron transistors turn on and off again every time one electron is added. In an interview, he said that the discovery that a transistor could turn on and off again every time an electron was added to it was one of the most astounding and exciting experiences of his life.

His recent research focused on the electronic properties of nanometer-size semiconductor structures and on the physics of high temperature (Tc ) superconductivity.

== Awards ==
Kastner received the 1995 David Adler Lectureship Award in the Field of Materials Physics from the American Physical Society for his research on semiconductors.
