= Curve tracer =

Electronic test equipment

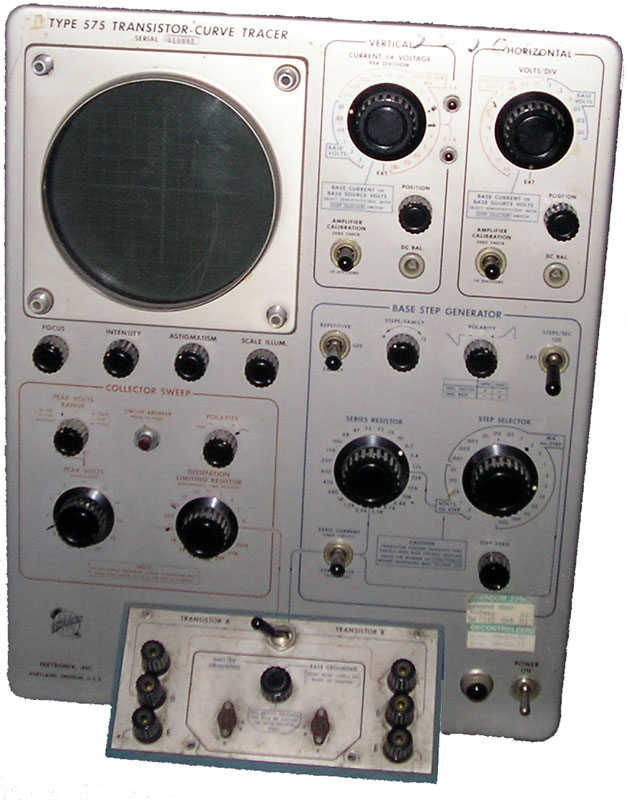
The Type 575 Transistor-Curve Tracer displays the dynamic characteristic curves of both NPN and PNP transistors on the screen of a 5-inch cathode-ray tube. Several different transistor characteristic curves may be displayed, including the collector family in the common-base and common emitter configuration. In addition to the transistor characteristic curves, the Type 575 is used to display dynamic characteristics of a wide range of semiconductor devices." (Tektronix, Catalog, 1967)

A curve tracer is a specialised piece of electronic test equipment used to analyze the characteristics of discrete electronic components, such as diodes, transistors, thyristors, and vacuum tubes. The device contains voltage and current sources that can be used to stimulate the device under test (DUT).

== Operation ==
The function is to apply a swept (automatically continuously varying with time) voltage to two terminals of the device under test and measure the amount of current that the device permits to flow at each voltage. This so-called I–V (current versus voltage) data is either directly displayed on an oscilloscope screen, or recorded to a data file for later processing and graphing with a computer. Configuration includes the maximum voltage applied, the polarity of the voltage applied (including the automatic application of both positive and negative polarities), and the resistance inserted in series with the device. The main terminal voltage can often be swept up to several thousand volts, with load currents of tens of amps available at lower voltages.

For two-terminal devices (such as diodes and DIACs), this is sufficient to fully characterize the device. The curve tracer can display all of the interesting parameters such as the diode's forward voltage, reverse leakage current, reverse breakdown voltage, and so on. For triggerable devices such as DIACs, the forward and reverse trigger voltages will be clearly displayed. The discontinuity caused by negative resistance devices (such as tunnel diodes) can also be seen. This is a method for finding electrically damaged pins on integrated circuit devices.

For three-terminal devices (such as transistors) a connection to the control terminal of the device being tested is used, such as the Base or Gate terminal. For BJT transistors and other current-controlled devices, the base or other control terminal current is stepped. For FETs or other voltage-controlled devices, a stepped voltage is used instead. By sweeping the voltage through the configured range of main terminal voltages, for each voltage step of the control signal, a group of I–V curves is generated automatically. This group of curves makes it very easy to determine the gain of a transistor, or the trigger voltage of a thyristor or TRIAC.

== Test Device Connection ==
Curve tracers usually contain convenient connection arrangements for two- or three-terminal devices, often in the form of sockets arranged to allow the plugging-in of the various common packages used for electronic components. Most curve tracers also allow the simultaneous connection of two DUTs; in this way, two DUTs can be "matched" for optimum performance in circuits (such as differential amplifiers) which depend upon the close matching of device parameters. This can be seen in the adjacent image where a toggle switch allows the rapid switching between the DUT on the left and the DUT on the right as the operator compared the respective curve families of the two devices.

I–V curves are used to characterize devices and materials through DC source-measure testing. These applications may also require the calculation of resistance and the derivation of other parameters based on I–V measurements. For example, I–V data can be used to study anomalies, locate maximum or minimum curve slopes, and perform reliability analyses. A typical application is finding a semiconductor diode's reverse bias leakage current and doing forward and reverse bias voltage sweeps and current measurements to generate its I–V curve.

=== Kelvin sensing ===
Curve tracers, especially high-current models, are usually supplied with various semiconductor device test fixture adapters that have Kelvin sensing.

=== Capacitive balance control ===
Some analog curve tracers, especially sensitive low-current models, are equipped with manual control for balancing a capacitive Bridge circuit for compensating ("nulling") the stray capacitances of the test setup. This adjustment is performed by tracing the curve of the empty test setup (with all required cables, probes, adapters, and other auxiliary devices connected, but without the DUT) and adjusting the balance control until the I curve is displayed at a constant zero level.

=== I–V Curve Tracing ===
I–V curve tracing is a method of analyzing the performance of a Photovoltaic system, ideal for testing all the possible operating points of a PV module or string of modules.

== History ==
Before the introduction of semiconductors, there were vacuum tube curve tracers (e.g., Tektronix 570). Early semiconductor curve tracers themselves used vacuum tube circuits, as semiconductor devices then available could not do everything required in a curve tracer. The Tektronix model 575 curve tracer shown in the gallery was a typical early instrument.

Nowadays, curve tracers are entirely solid state and are substantially automated to ease the workload of the operator, automatically capture data, and assure the safety of the curve tracer and the DUT. Recent developments in curve tracer systems now allow three core types of curve tracing: current–voltage (I–V), capacitance-voltage (C-V), and ultra-fast transient or pulsed current–voltage (I–V). Modern curve tracer instrument designs tend to be modular, allowing system specifiers to configure them to match the applications for which they will be used. For example, new mainframe-based curve tracer systems can be configured by specifying the number and power level of the Source Measure Units (SMUs) to be plugged into the slots in the back panel of the chassis. This modular design also provides the flexibility to incorporate other types of instrumentation to handle a wider range of applications. These mainframe-based systems typically include a self-contained PC to simplify test setup, data analysis, graphing and printing, and onboard results storage. Users of these types of systems include semiconductor researchers, device modeling engineers, reliability engineers, die-sort engineers, and process development engineers.

In addition to mainframe-based systems, other curve tracer solutions are available that allow system builders to combine one or more discrete Source-Measure Units (SMUs) with a separate PC controller running curve tracer software. Discrete SMUs offer a broader range of current, voltage, and power levels than mainframe-based systems permit and allow the system to be reconfigured as test needs change. New Wizard-based user interfaces have been developed to make it easy for students or less experienced industry users to find and run the tests they need, such as the FET curve trace test.

== Safety ==
Some curve tracers, specifically those designed for high voltage or current or power devices, are capable of generating lethal voltages and currents and so pose an electrocution hazard for the operator. Modern curve tracers often contain mechanical shields and interlocks that make it more difficult for the operator to come into contact with hazardous voltages or currents. Power DUTs can become dangerously hot during testing. Inexpensive curve tracers cannot test such devices and are less likely to be lethally dangerous.

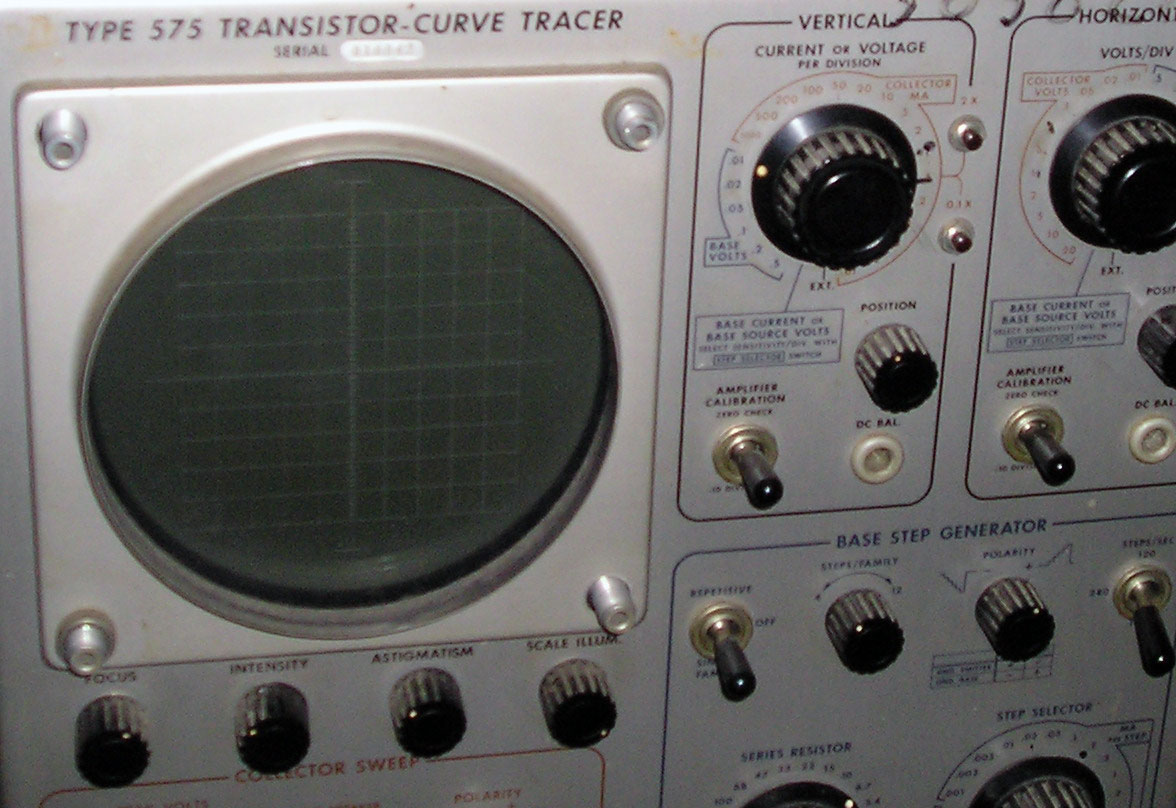
Transistor-curve tracer (detail 1)

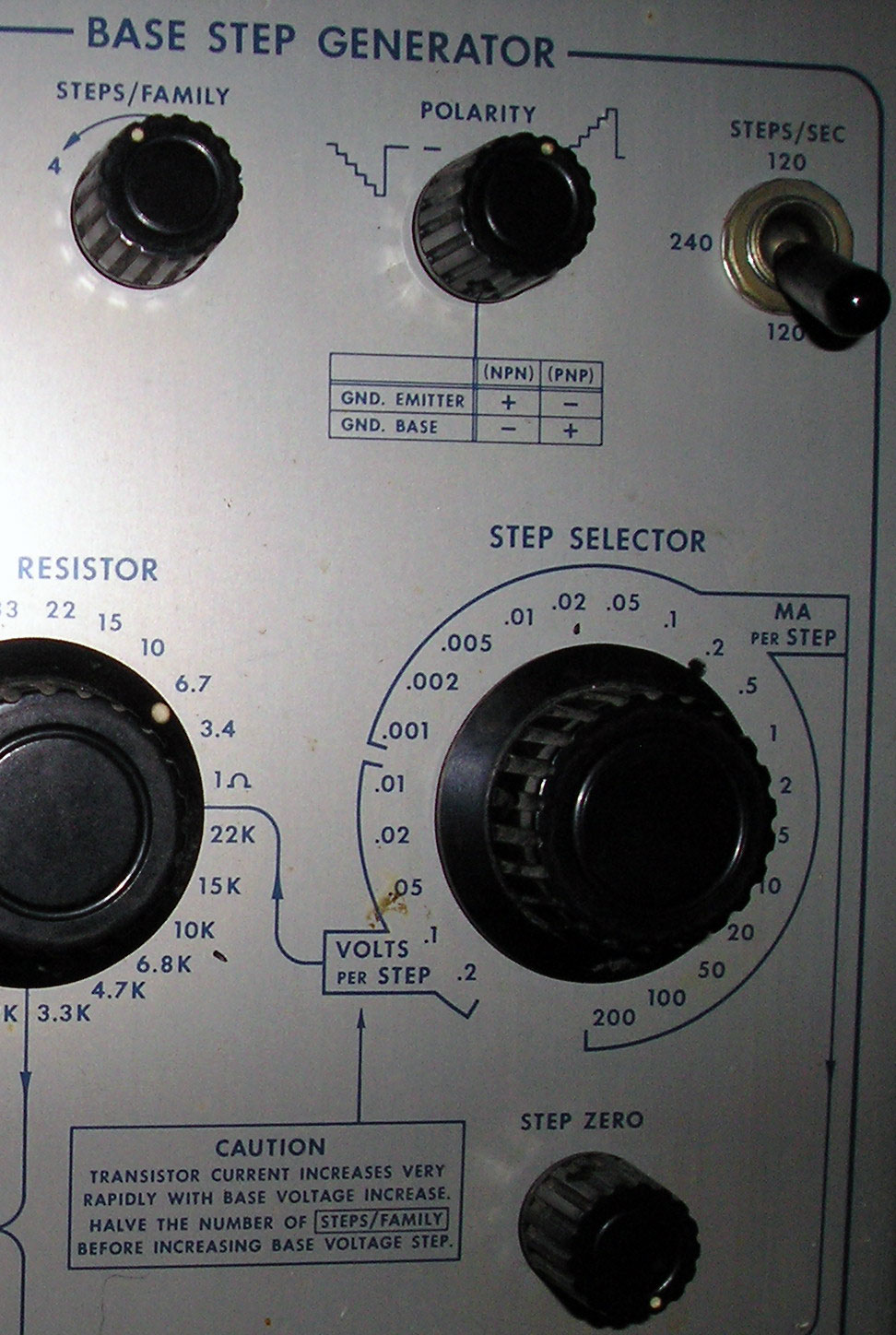
Transistor-curve tracer (detail 2)

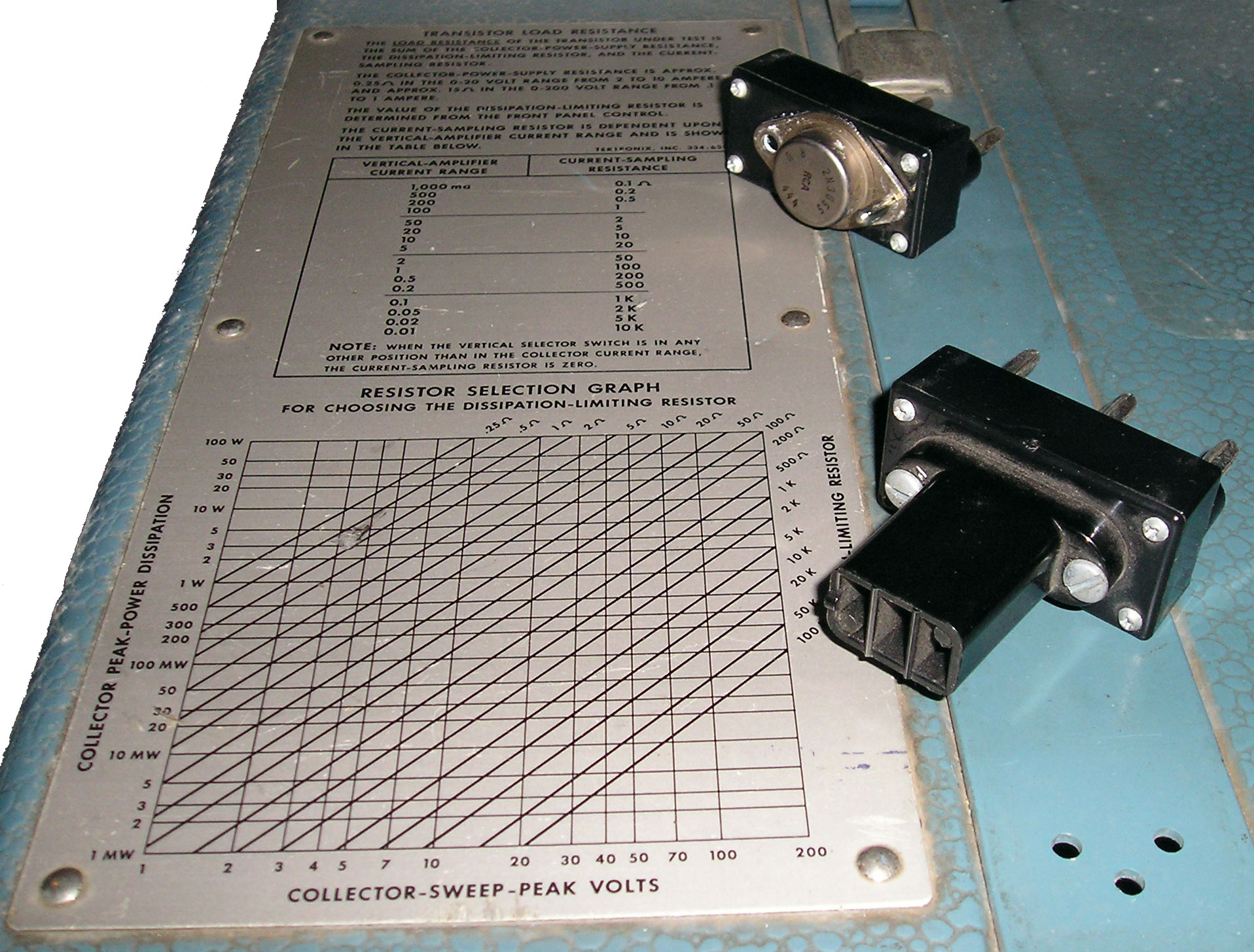
Transistor-curve tracer (parts)
