= Thin-film diode =

Thin film diode (TFD) generally refers to any diode produced using thin-film technology.

Within the flat panel display industry TFD more often refers to thin film bi-directional diodes, also known as metal-insulator-metal (MIM) TFDs or nonlinear resistors. Bi-directional MIM TFDs have very low current flow at low applied voltages, but then begin to conduct electricity above a threshold voltage, of either positive or negative polarity. Owing to this behavior these two terminal devices may be used as a switch. The exact threshold voltage at which a MIM TFD switches on and begins to conduct electricity depends on its physical dimensions, such as thickness of the insulating layer, as well as the physical properties of the materials from which it is made, such as the work function of each metal layer.

== Commercial applications ==
Flat panel display manufactures have found use for MIM TFDs as switches in active matrix technology such as active matrix liquid crystal displays (AMLCD). Historically in AMLCDs the switching device of choice for pixels has been the thin-film transistor (TFT), however MIM TFD based displays have had some commercial success as they are simpler to make; only requiring two to three photo-lithography steps rather than the typical 5 or more needed to produce thin film transistors.

In short, the millions of switches housed on an active matrix display's back-plane, be they TFTs or TFDs, must each be able to accurately and repeatably control the voltage applied to their respective pixel in order to control its grey scale. While thin film diodes are cheaper to manufacture than TFTs it can difficult to achieve a wide color gamut and grey scale using single TFDs. These limitation can be overcome however by using a dual-select diode circuit which incorporates two MIM TFDs per pixel circuit.

South Korean electronics manufacturers LG and Samsung have both previously incorporated MIM TFDs into mobile phone displays. The American company Amorphyx Inc. was founded in 2012 to commercialize MIM-TFD technology incorporating amorphous metal materials.

== See also ==
- Active-matrix liquid-crystal display
- LCD television
