= Tunnel junction =

Barrier between electrically conducting materials

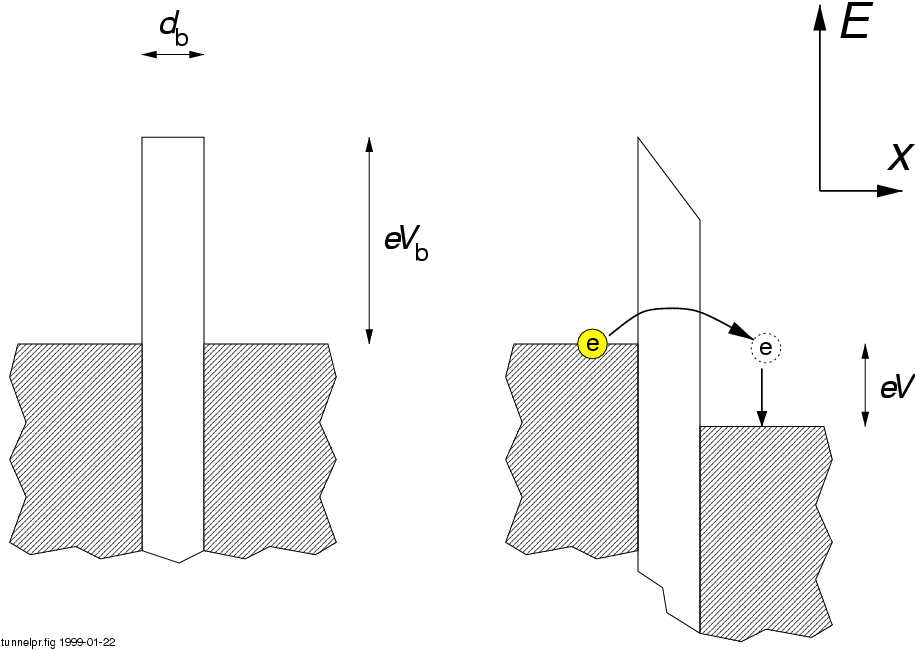
Schematic representation of an electron tunneling through a barrier

In electronics, a tunnel junction is a barrier, such as a thin insulating layer or electric potential, between two electrically conducting materials. Electrons (or quasiparticles) pass through the barrier by the process of quantum tunnelling. Classically, the electron has zero probability of passing through the barrier. However, according to quantum mechanics, the electron has a non-zero wave amplitude in the barrier, and hence it has some probability of passing through the barrier. Tunnel junctions serve a variety of different purposes.

== Multijunction photovoltaic cell ==
In multijunction photovoltaic cells, tunnel junctions form the connections between consecutive p-n junctions. They function as an ohmic electrical contact in the middle of a semiconductor device.

== Magnetic tunnel junction ==
In magnetic tunnel junctions, electrons tunnel through a thin insulating barrier from one magnetic material to another. This can serve as a basis for a magnetic detector.

== Superconducting tunnel junction ==
In superconducting tunnel junctions, two superconducting electrodes are separated by a non-superconducting barrier. Cooper pairs carry the supercurrent through the barrier by quantum tunneling, a phenomenon known as the Josephson effect. This setup can form the basis for extremely sensitive magnetometers, known as SQUIDs, as well as many other devices.

== Tunnel diode ==
In tunnel diodes, a diode allows the tunneling of electrons for certain voltages. This allows them to be used for generating high-frequency signals.

== Scanning tunneling microscope ==
In scanning tunneling microscopy (STM), the tip/air/substrate can be viewed as a tunnel junction.
