= List of fellows of the American Physical Society (2011–present) =

The American Physical Society honors members with the designation Fellow for having made significant accomplishments to the field of physics.

The following list includes those fellows selected since 2011.

== 2011 ==
- Nikolaus Adams
- Claudia Draxl
- Jean-Philippe Ansermet
- William J. Atkinson
- Harut Avagyan
- Alexander Balandin
- Edward A. Baron
- Stephen Barr
- Manfred Bayer
- John Beamish
- Alice Bean
- Brian Bennett
- Michael Birse
- Steven Block
- Michael Bonitz
- John H. Booske
- Timothy Boykin
- Carl Brans
- Arne Brataas
- Alain Brizard
- April Brown
- Michael Brown
- Harald Brune
- Henrik Bruus
- Alessandra Buonanno
- Cathryn Carson
- Andrea Cavalleri
- Deepto Chakrabarty
- Tapash Chakraborty
- Robert Charity
- Michael Chertkov
- Ashot Chilingarian
- Min S. Chong
- Hans Christen
- Jason Cleveland
- Daniel Cox
- Nicholas Curro
- Curt Cutler
- Kari Dalnoki-Veress
- Peter Delfyett
- Regina Demina
- Mark Devlin
- Judith Driscoll
- Brett Dunlap
- Michael J. Edwards
- Robert Edwards
- Konstantin Efetov
- Eitan Ehrenfreund
- Aida El-Khadra
- Thomas Elsaesser
- Rolf Ent
- August Evrard
- Zhong Fang
- Marie Farge
- Edward Farhi
- Yuan Feng
- Andrea Carlo Ferrari
- Manfred Fiebig
- Jay Fineberg
- Noah Finkelstein
- Brenna L. Flaugher
- Robert C. Forrey
- Wendy Freedman
- Jonathan Freund
- Mette B. Gaarde
- Feng Gai
- Reimund Gerhard
- Timothy Germann
- Christopher Gerry
- Sandip Ghosal
- Walter Giele
- Michel J.P. Gingras
- David Ginley
- Michael Graham
- Fernando F. Grinstein
- Genda Gu
- Marina Guenza
- Shaul Hanany
- Werner Hanke
- Fiona Harrison
- Robert Hayes
- David Hedin
- Rigoberto Hernandez
- David Hinde
- John Hobbs
- Axel Hoffmann
- Donald Holmgren
- Minghwei Hong
- Howard Hu
- Danhong Huang
- Harold Hwang
- Chris Jacobsen
- Marcelo Jaime
- Chueng-Ryong Ji
- Ralf Kaiser
- Robin Kaiser
- Yukio Kaneda
- Jordan Katine
- Jonathan Katz
- Massoud Kaviany
- Sarah L. Keller
- Jacob Khurgin
- Joshua Klein
- Joseph Klewicki
- Gerhard Klimeck
- Volker Koch
- Svetlana Kotochigova
- Anna Krylov
- Michael Kurtz
- Mark Kuzyk
- Raymond Laflamme
- Bruce Law
- Feng Liu
- Gui Long
- Patrick Lukens
- Jonathan Machta
- Andrew Mackenzie
- Krishnan Mahesh
- Naomi C. Makins
- H. Jonathon Mamin
- Paul Mantsch
- Piero Martin
- C. Jeff Martoff
- Tsutomu Mashimo
- James M. Matthews
- Michael McCarthy
- Julie McEnery
- Jr McKee
- Colin McKinstrie
- Desmond McMorrow
- Constantine Megaridis
- Thomas Mehlhorn
- Carl Meinhart
- Kirill Menikov
- Vincent Meunier
- Bogdan Mihaila
- Evgeny Mishin
- Vladimir Mitin
- Rajat Mittal
- Piet Mulders
- David Muller
- James Napolitano
- Vijay Narayanan
- Chetan Nayak
- David E. Newman
- Yosef Nir
- Beatriz Noheda
- Jeremy O'Brien
- Yuri Oganessian
- Serdar Ogut
- Maxim Olchanyi
- Hans Paetz gen. Schieck
- Christoph Paus
- Dvora Perahia
- Kirk Peterson
- A. Phelps
- Darrin Pochan
- Antonio Politi
- Stephen Pordes
- Scott Pratt
- Dean Preston
- Frans Pretorius
- Ruslan Prozorov
- Johann Rafelski
- William Rees
- Daniel Reich
- Charles Reichhardt
- Cynthia Reichhardt
- Oscar Reula
- Adam Riess
- Thorsten Ritz
- John Robertson
- Rodney Ruoff
- Marianna S. Safronova
- Susumu Saito
- Dilano Saldin
- Thomas Sangster
- Eric Schiff
- Peter J. Schmid
- Mathias Schuber
- Daniel K. Schwartz
- Earl Scime
- Joan Shea
- Jian Shen
- Gary Shiu
- Alexander Shluger
- Manfred Sigrist
- Chandralekha Singh
- John Smolin
- Christopher Soles
- Gary Staebler
- Kenneth Stalder
- Alexei Starobinsky
- Ady Stern
- Yuri Suzuki
- Adam Szczepaniak
- Yoshiro Takahashi
- Zlatko Tesanovic
- Jennifer Thomas
- Uwe Thumm
- Terry Tritt
- Nandini Trivedi
- Lev Tsimring
- Ophelia Tsui
- Mark Tuominen
- Eric Van Stryland
- Ashok Vaseashta
- Cristina Volpe
- Barry C. Walker
- Lian-Ping Wang
- Xiaogang Wang
- Yuh-Lin Wang
- Eric Weeks
- Ching-Ming Wei
- Robert A. Weller
- Andrew White
- Magnus Willander
- Howard Wiseman
- George Wong
- Gerard Wong
- Michael Wraback
- Stephen Wukitch
- Tao Xiang
- John Xiao
- Hiroaki Yamamoto
- Yanfa Yan
- Jinlong Yang
- Kun Yang
- Syun-Ru Yeh
- Yosef Yeshurun
- Albert Young
- Paolo Zanardi
- Ruhong Zhou
- Shiyao Zhu
- Xiaoyang Zhu
- Yuntian Zhu
- Stefano de Gironcoli

== 2012 ==
- Joanna Aizenberg
- Rufina Alamo
- P. Henrik Alfredsson
- Maria Allegrini
- Igor Altfeder
- William Anderson
- John Arrington
- Elke-Caroline Aschenauer
- Markus Aspelmeyer
- Alán Aspuru-Guzik
- Luis M. Balicas
- Wei Bao
- Robert Bari
- Emanuela Barzi
- Rashid Bashir
- Xavier Batlle
- Silas Beane
- James J. Beatty
- Raymond Beausoleil
- Kamran Behnia
- Alexey Belyanin
- Carlos A. Bertulani
- Marcela M. Bilek
- Jeffrey C. Blackmon
- Robert H. Blick
- Jonathan C. Boettger
- Neil K. Bourne
- Raphael Bousso
- Nora Brambilla
- Howard Branz
- Joel D. Brock
- Ralf A. Bundschuh
- Bruce A. Bunker
- John Byrd
- Marc Cahay
- Robert Cammarata
- Robert W. Carpick
- Thomas F. Carruthers
- Michael E. Chandross
- Chia-Seng Chang
- Gang Chen
- Shi-Jie Chen
- Cheng-Chung Chi
- Vincenzo Cirigliano
- James P. Colgan
- Reuben T. Collins
- David M. Cook
- Paul Cottle
- Priscilla Cushman
- Bhanu Das
- Sridhara Dasu
- Donal Day
- Andre Luiz De Gouvea
- Glenn Decker
- Marcellinus Demarteau
- Eugene Demler
- Daniel J. Den Hartog
- Benoit Deveaud
- Paul Deyoung
- Massimiliano Di Ventra
- Jens Dilling
- Andris M. Dimits
- Nikolay Dokholyan
- David R. Dowling
- Mitra Dutta
- Ulrich Eckern
- Samy El-Shall
- Bengt Eliasson
- Mark A. Eriksson
- Claudia Felser
- Juan C. Fernandez
- Dino Fiorani
- Donald G. Fleming
- Johan Frenje
- Amalie Frischknecht
- Bruce Fryxell
- Christopher Fuchs
- Dmitry Fursa
- Alfonso M. Ganan-Calvo
- Venkatraghavan Ganesan
- Anupam K. Garg
- Steven Giddings
- Douglas Glenzinski
- Dan M. Goebel
- Rachel Goldman
- Venkatraman Gopalan
- Nikolai Gorelenkov
- Daniel Gottesman
- Alexandre O. Govorov
- Christoph Grein
- Terry W. Gullion
- Chunlei Guo
- Ephraim Gutmark
- Satoshi Hamaguchi
- Lene V. Hau
- Andreas J. Heinrich
- Stuart Henderson
- Dan S. Henningson
- Mark C. Hermann
- Mark C. Hersam
- Wayne P. Hess
- Peter Hoeflich
- Richard A. Holt
- William L. Holzapfel
- Anette E. Hosoi
- Huan Z. Huang
- John P. Huennekens
- Scott Hughes
- Joseph Incandela
- Tom Intrator
- Balasubramanian Iyer
- Wonho Jhe
- Kui-juan Jin
- Michelle D. Johannes
- Robert Johnson
- Stephen R. Julian
- Namanja Kaloper
- Demosthenes Kazanas
- Galina Khitrova
- Yong-Baek Kim
- Sergey Klimenko
- Lloyd E. Knox
- Andrey Korytov
- Petros Koumoutsakos
- Yuri Kovchegov
- Todd D. Krauss
- Young Kuk
- Daniel Kulp
- Milind N. Kunchur
- Makoto Kuwata-Gonokami
- Akhlesh Lakhtakia
- Alex Lazarian
- Valeri Lebedev
- Norman R. Lebowitz
- Chris Leighton
- David M. Leitner
- Christopher Li
- Derun Li
- James Liddle
- Zoltan Ligeti
- Jingyu Lin
- Robert P. Lin
- Ronald Lipton
- Kai Liu
- Mathias Loesche
- Lynn Loo
- Turab Lookman
- Carlos Lousto
- Li Lu
- Frederick C. MacKintosh
- Hernán A. Makse
- Paul Mantica
- Stephen Martin
- Neil D. Mathur
- Benjamin McCall
- Martha R. McCartney
- Baruch Meerson
- David E. Meltzer
- Jie Meng
- Dirk Klaus Morr
- Stephen W. Morris
- William Munro
- Steve Myers
- Alan Nakatani
- Douglas Natelson
- Heidi Jo Newberg
- Shouleh Nikzad
- Bernd R. Noack
- Peter Norreys
- Alexander Novokhatski
- Hideo Ohno
- Takaharu Otsuka
- Howard Padmore
- Hyeon K. Park
- Neelesh A. Patankar
- Heinz Pitsch
- Alexios Polychronakos
- Dragana Popovic
- Arian Pregenzer
- Fei Qi
- Ronald Redmer
- Joan Redwing
- David A. Reis
- Fritz Riehle
- Peter S. Riseborough
- David Robin
- Christopher M. Roland
- Mikhail V. Romalis
- Aaron Roodman
- Daniel H. Rothman
- Sheila Rowan
- Karissa Sanbonmatsu
- Michael B. Santos
- Sergey Saveliev
- Sergej Savrasov
- Alexander A. Schekochihin
- Christian Schönenberger
- Carl B. Schroeder
- William W. Schultz
- Achim Schwenk
- Richard Seto
- Mark D. Shattuck
- Jing Shi
- David C. Shiner
- Michelle Shinn
- Susan B. Sinnott
- Chris Sorensen
- Stephen Southworth
- Eliot Specht
- Ian Spielman
- Mark Spitzer
- Dan Moss Stamper-Kurn
- Phillip C. Stancil
- John F. Stanton
- Susanne Stemmer (physicist)
- Iain Stewart (physicist)
- Qichang Su
- Robert Svoboda
- Minas Tanielian
- Max Tegmark
- Luc Thomas
- Sigurdur T. Thoroddsen
- Zoltan Toroczkai
- Tonica Valla
- Marc Vanderhaeghen
- Oleg V. Vasilyev
- Ivan Vitev
- Vladan Vuletic
- Doreen Wackeroth
- Hongfei Wang
- Mu Wang
- Nan Lin Wang
- Shan X. Wang
- Yun Wang
- James Watkins
- Thomas Weinacht
- Mark C. Williams
- John M. Wills
- Robert A. Wolkow
- Richard P. Woodard
- Zhen Wu
- Peng Xiong
- Amir Yacoby
- Jihui Yang
- Minami Yoda
- Qiming Zhang
- Xiaoguang Zhang
- Zhengguo Zhao
- Xiaowei Zhuang
- Gergely T. Zimanyi
- Carlos A. R. Sa de Melo

== 2013 ==
- Darin E. Acosta
- Fred C. Adams
- Anatoli Afanasjev
- Pamir Alpay
- Brian P. Anderson
- Joerg Appenzeller
- Leon Balents
- John Charles Barbour
- Randy A. Bartels
- John F. Beacom
- Matthew C. Beard
- Krzysztof Belczyński
- John H. Belk
- Ilan Benjamin
- Claire Berger
- Jan E. Beyea
- Sandra G. Biedron
- David G. Blair
- Thomas F. Boggess Jr.
- Sergey Bravyi
- Yunhai Cai
- David Carroll
- Charles Cerjan
- William A. Challener
- Premala Chandra
- Christine Charles
- Hongyu Chen
- Yang Chen
- Kingman Cheung
- Margaret S. Cheung
- Thomas Chou
- Kenneth T. Christensen
- Noel T. Clemens
- Robert W. Collins
- Neil J. Cornish
- Costantino Creton
- Stefano Curtarolo
- Giacomo Mauro D'Ariano
- Karin A. Dahmen
- Jean Dalibard
- Viatcheslav V. Danilov
- Alejandro L. De Lozanne
- Steven L. Detweiler
- Willem H. Dickhoff
- Mark M. Disko
- Bogdan A. Dobrescu
- Paul J. Dolan Jr.
- Marija Drndic
- Vladimir Dzuba
- Paul Fallon
- Paul Fendley
- Jimmy J. Feng
- Charles D. Ferguson II
- Gennady Fiksel
- Alexander Finkelstein
- Ian R. Fisher
- Bonnie T. Fleming
- John F. Foss
- Alexandra Gade
- Dmitry Garanin
- Susan V. Gardner
- Robert J. Garisto
- David Gates
- Thierry Giamarchi
- Paolo Giannozzi
- Charles J. Glinka
- Nickolay Y. Gnedin
- John C. Gore
- Rama Govindarajan
- Charles Greenfield (physicist)
- David G. Grier
- Jeffrey C. Grossman
- Alexei Gruverman
- Hua Guo
- Shangjr F. Gwo
- David S. Hall
- Katherine Harkay
- Zahid Hasan
- Karsten M. Heeger
- Wouter D. Hoff
- Stephen E. Holland
- Suxing Hu
- Thomas L. Jackson
- David E. Jaffe
- Yogesh Jaluria
- Ulrich D. Jentschura
- Arne Johansson
- Thomas W. Jones
- Cherie R. Kagan
- Nasser Kalantar-Nayestanaki
- Alex Kamenev
- Adam Kaminski
- Josef A. Kas
- David Kastor
- Michael Keidar
- Scott J. Kenyon
- James M. Kikkawa
- Tom Kirchner
- Rami Kishek
- Boaz Klima
- Randall D. Knight
- Marcus D. Knudson
- Viatcheslav Kokoouline
- Diana L. Kormos Buchwald
- Steven K. Korotky
- V. Krishnamurthy
- Ondrej L. Krivanek
- Leeor Kronik
- Patrice Le Gal
- Seunghun Lee
- Yoonseok Lee
- Konrad Lehnert
- Walter Lempert
- Bao-An Li
- Baowen Li
- Qiang Li
- Steven L. Liebling
- J. Ping Liu
- Jie Liu
- Erik Luijten
- Robert Lysak
- Anatoly Maksimchuk
- John B. Marston
- Nils Martensson
- Hedi M. Mattoussi
- Manos Mavrikakis
- Robert D. Mawhinney
- Kevin F. McCarty
- Patrick McCray
- Mark D. Messier
- Roman G. Mints
- Chandrashekhar Mishra
- Daniel Mittleman
- John Moody
- Joel E. Moore
- Jeffrey Morris
- David P. Morrison
- Adilson E. Motter
- V. Parameswaran Nair
- Ranganathan Narayanan
- Petr Navrátil
- Jeffrey B. Neaton
- John J. Neumeier
- Josep Nogues
- George S. Nolas
- Valentyn Novosad
- Luis A. Nunes Amaral
- Christopher K. Ober
- James D. Olsen
- Fiorenzo Omenetto
- Benjamin J. Owen
- Lyman A. Page
- Josef Paldus
- Thomas T.M. Palstra
- Jian-Wei Pan
- Xiaoqing Pan
- Fulvio Parmigiani
- Pravesh Patel
- Vasili V. Perebeinos
- Frank Petriello
- Olivier R. Pfister
- Leo E. Piilonen
- Steven J. Plimpton
- Martin K.W. Pohl
- Thomas Powers
- Eric J. Prebys
- Han Pu
- Chandra Raman
- Simon Raoux
- Markus B. Raschke
- Leonard F. Register
- Alejandro Rey
- Martin C. Richardson
- Elisa Riedo
- Thomas G. Rizzo
- Adrian Roitberg
- Gunther M. Roland
- Stephan Rosenkranz
- S. David Rosner
- Markus Roth
- Brian T. Saam
- Celeste Sagui
- Christophe E. Salomon
- Fernando Sannibale
- Michael F. Schatz
- Stefan E. Schippers
- Christoph Schmidt
- Klaus Schmidt-Rohr
- Andrew Schmitt
- Marilyn Beth Schneider
- Robert W. Schoenlein
- Kate Scholberg
- Roman Schrittwieser
- Eric R. Schwegler
- Uros Seljak
- Daniel A. Shaddock
- Jie Shan
- Donna Sheng
- Zheng-Ming Sheng
- Deirdre M. Shoemaker
- Joern I. Siepmann
- Zuzanna S. Siwy
- Charles Skinner
- Dennis Slafer
- Michael S. Smith
- William M. Snow
- Jorge O. Sofo
- Alfredo Soldati
- Gabriel C. Spalding
- David N. Spergel
- Matthias Steffen
- Hans-Peter Steinrueck
- Mikhail Stephanov
- James M. Stone
- Hyung Jin Sung
- Timothy M.P. Tait
- Makariy A. Tanatar
- Uwe C. Tauber
- Harry B. Thacker
- Ian J. Thompson
- Francis X. Timmes
- Douglas J. Tobias
- Senthil Todadri
- Leonid A. Turkevich
- James M. Valles
- Jan Van Ruitenbeek
- Roberto Verzicco
- Jorge Vinals
- Ashvin Vishwanath
- Robert B. Vogelaar
- Stamatis Vokos
- Willem L. Vos
- Jian Wang
- Wei-Hua Wang
- Justin S. Wark
- James D. Wells
- Hai-Hu Wen
- Steven Wereley
- Jose E. Wesfreid
- Stefan Westerhoff
- Angela K. Wilson
- Boleslaw Wyslouch
- Yijing Yan
- Chien-Peng Yuan
- Jiang Zhao
- Steven J. Zinkle
- Jian-Min Zuo
- Hugo W. van der Hart

== 2014 ==
- Peter Abbamonte
- David W. Abraham
- Vladimir Aksyuk
- Mary Alberg
- Alan Alda
- Michael Altman (scientist)
- Jacques Amar
- Shelley L. Anna
- Elke Arenholz
- Michael R. Armstrong
- Peter B. Arnold
- David M. Asner
- Donald R. Baer
- Mei Bai
- Stuart D. Bale
- Kaustav Banerjee
- Jean-Louis Barrat
- Christopher P.J. Barty
- Steffen A. Bass
- Kevin E. Bassler
- Cristian D. Batista
- Raymond J. Beach
- Mark T. Bernius
- Alexey Bezryadin
- Lars Bildsten
- Mary R. Bishai
- Michael R. Bockstaller
- Steven E. Boggs
- Stanislav A. Boldyrev
- Corwin H. Booth
- Jordi Boronat
- Malcolm G. Boshier
- Philippe Bouyer
- Iain D. Boyd
- Roy Briere
- David A. Broido
- Duncan A. Brown
- Karen L. Byrum
- Debra A. Callahan
- John M. Campbell
- Andrew M. Canning
- Lincoln D. Carr
- Troy Carter
- Colm-Cille P. Caulfield
- Hugues Chate
- Guanhua Chen
- Cheng Chin (scientist)
- Herman Clercx
- Luigi Colombo (scientist)
- John O. Dabiri
- Andrea Damascelli
- Marcos Dantus
- Dana Dattelbaum
- Luiz Davidovich
- Abhay Deshpande
- Tiziana Di Matteo
- Yujie Ding
- Stephen K. Doorn
- Wolfgang Ertmer
- Fernando A. Escobedo
- Morten R. Eskildsen
- Michelle A. Espy
- Tilman Esslinger
- William M. Fawley
- Peter Fischer
- Randy Fishman
- Karen A. Flack
- Marcel Franz
- John W. Freeland
- Jay M. Gambetta
- Oleg Gang
- Margaret Gardel
- Valeriy Ginzburg
- Larry D. Gladney
- Daniel I. Goldman
- Antonios Gonis
- Kenneth E. Goodson
- Senta V. Greene
- Ross W. Griffiths
- Jinghua Guo
- Eva Halkiadakis
- Alex Hamilton
- Deborah A. Harris
- Frederic V. Hartemann
- Avetik R. Harutyunyan
- Ahmed Hassanein
- Jay Hauser
- Elizabeth A. Hays
- Olle G. Heinonen
- C. Stephen Hellberg
- Stephen Hill
- Rong-Ming Ho
- Mahir S. Hussein
- Nobuhiko Izumi
- Bret E. Jackson
- Changqing Jin
- Borje Johansson
- John M. Jowett
- Serafim Kalliadasis
- David E. Kaplan
- Victoria Kaspi
- Reizo Kato
- Declan F. Keane
- Pawel J. Keblinski
- Wai-Yee Keung
- Panayotis Kevrekidis
- William P. King
- Douglas A. Kirkpatrick
- Valery D. Kiryukhin
- Paul Koenraad
- Arthur Kosowsky
- Feodor V. Kusmartsev
- Vincent P. LaBella
- Mohamed Laradji
- Michael I. Larkin
- Andrei G. Lebed
- Dean Lee
- Sang Joon Lee
- Anthony W. Leonard
- Richard A. Lesar
- Janna Levin
- Ju Li
- Ching-Long Lin
- Natalia M. Litchinitser
- Despina A. Louca
- H. Peter Lu
- Margaret Malloy
- Roberto C. Mancini
- Joseph V. Mantese
- Zhiqiang Mao
- Laura E. Marcucci
- Andrew H. Marcus
- Ernesto E. Marinero
- Sera Markoff
- Nicola Marzari
- Angelo Mascarenhas
- Spiridoula C. Matsika
- Jose Menendez
- Amber D. Miller
- Kimball A. Milton
- Leonid Mirny
- Cristopher Moore
- Roberto Morandotti
- Colin Morningstar
- David R. Morrison
- Erich J. Mueller
- Guido Mueller
- Marcus Muller (scientist)
- Christopher J. Mundy
- Kohji Nakamura
- Qing Nie
- Tom Osborne
- John H. Page
- Ravindra Pandey
- M. Alessandra Papa
- Thomas F. Papenbrock
- David Pappas
- Arne J. Pearlstein
- Michael R. Pennington
- Rosalba Perna
- Tilman Pfau
- Anh Tuan Phan
- So-Young Pi
- Maria N. Piancastelli
- Arkady Pikovsky
- Alberto Pique
- Kevin T. Pitts
- Randolf Pohl
- Andrew Pollard
- Alan W.P. Poon
- Alain J. Pumir
- Hong Qin
- Ralf F. Rapp
- Ana Maria Rey
- Andrew G. Rinzler
- George Rodriguez
- Aldo H. Romero
- Federico Rosei
- Peter C. Rowson
- Robert E. Rudd
- Stephen E. Russek
- David Ruzic
- Andrew S. Sachrajda
- Farid Salama
- Bahaa E.A. Saleh
- Robin Santra
- Kausik Sarkar
- Avadh B. Saxena
- David J. Schlegel
- John A. Schlueter
- Joerg Schmiedmayer
- Robert M. Schofield
- Michael P. Schultz
- Reinhard A. Schumacher
- Terrence J. Sejnowski
- Jonathan V. Selinger
- Klaus Sengstock
- Ram Seshadri
- Boris Shapiro
- Zhen-Su She
- Li Shi
- Stephen A. Slutz
- Marc K. Smith
- Sara A. Solla
- Maria Spiropulu
- Hariharan Srikanth
- Suzanne T. Staggs
- Philip Stamp
- Stepan Stepanyan
- Steven Strogatz
- Shufang Su
- Wu-Pei Su
- Bobby G. Sumpter
- Bengt G. Svensson
- Grzehorz Szamel
- Atsushi Takahara
- Yoshitaka Tanimura
- Suzanne Te Velthuis
- Scott Thomas
- Joseph H. Thywissen
- James G. Tobin
- Jeffrey A. Tostevin
- Andre-Marie Tremblay
- Sergei Tretiak
- Michael S. Triantafyllou
- Carsten-Andreas Ullrich
- Bart Van Wees
- Julia Velkovska
- Lorenza Viola
- Joshua Wand
- Cai-Zhuang Wang
- Meng Wang
- Yinmin Wang
- Z. Jane Wang
- Kevin J. Webb
- Chris H. Wiggins
- Fred Wolf
- Vitaly Yakimenko
- Lin Yin
- Peter H. Yoon
- Feng Yuan (scientist)
- A. Zee
- Bing Zhang
- Jiandi Zhang
- Wenqing Zhang
- Alexander V. Zlobin
- Jesus A. del Alamo

== 2015 ==
- Artem Abanov
- Johan Akerman
- Mark Alford
- Andrea Alu
- Hiroshi Amano
- Douglas Arion
- Daniel Arovas
- Tariq Aslam
- James Babb
- Steven Batha
- Laura Baudis
- Eric Bauer
- Lothar Bauerdick
- Sergey Belomestnykh
- Lee Bernstein
- Noam Bernstein
- Emanuele Berti
- Manuel Bibes
- Krastan Blagoev
- Immanuel Bloch
- Thomas Blum
- Peter Blunden
- Stephen Bradforth
- Silke Buehler-Paschen
- Laura Cadonati
- Gretchen Campbell
- Erica Carlson
- Ashton Carter
- Sue Carter
- Scott Chambers
- Hou-Tong Chen
- Jeff Chen
- Yanbei Chen
- Zhigang Chen
- Majed Chergui
- Hsiao-Mei Cho
- Carson Chow
- Daniel Claes
- Roderick Clark
- David Cobden
- James Cochran
- David G. Cory
- Dennis Coyne
- Alfred Crosby
- John D'Auria
- Jose D'Incao
- Diego Alejandro Dalvit
- Stuart Dalziel
- Hooman Davoudiasl
- Anne De Wit
- Kaushik De
- Brian DeMarco
- Pablo Debenedetti
- Ricardo Decca
- Per Delsing
- Stavros Demos
- Daniel Dessau
- Haim Diamant
- Roland Diehl
- Tomasz Dietl
- Fiorenza Donato
- Michael Drewsen
- Berge Englert
- Dean Evans
- Marco Fanciulli
- Craig Fennie
- Jaime Fernandez-Baca
- Douglas Finkbeiner
- Gleb Finkelstein
- Jerzy Floryan
- Steven Frautschi
- Mark Freeman
- Stefan Funk
- Ivo Furno
- Maurice Garcia-Sciveres
- David Gerdes
- Oliver Gessner
- Tony Gherghetta
- Thomas Gorczyca
- Martin Grant
- Thomas Greenslade
- Julie Grollier
- Michael Gronau
- Matthias Grosse Perdekamp
- Roger Hagengruber
- Hans Hallen
- Daniel Haskel
- Guowei He
- Xiao-Gang He
- Christopher Hearty
- Stefan Hell
- Zhirong Huang
- Bruce Hunt
- Giuseppe Iannaccone
- Bhuvnesh Jain
- Frank Jenko
- Byungnam Kahng
- James Kakalios
- Sergei V. Kalinin
- Gamani Karunasiri
- Roland Kawakami
- Vasili Kharchenko
- Ki Kim
- Mackillo Kira
- Anatoly Kolomeisky
- Eiichiro Komatsu
- Jeffrey Koseff
- Yakov Krasik
- Roman Krems
- Graham Kribs
- Hulikal Krishnamurthy
- Satish Kumar
- Viswanathan Kumaran
- Shane Larson
- George V. Lauder
- O Lavrentovich
- Richard Lebed
- Liliane Leger
- Andre Levchenko
- Xiaoqin Li
- Tianquan Lian
- Ron Lifshitz
- Don Lincoln
- Junming Liu
- Abraham Loeb
- Mark Lumsden
- Yu-Gang Ma
- Grzegorz Madejski
- Vidya Madhavan
- Niels Madsen
- John Maier
- Thomas Maier
- Michael James Manfra
- Tariq Manzur
- Ivar Martin
- Omar Matar
- Konstantin Matchev
- Francesco Mauri
- Stephane Mazevet
- Thomas Meitzler
- Carlos Meriles
- Igor Mezic
- Pierre Michel
- Kalman Migler
- Timothy Minton
- Prabhakar Misra
- Vesna Mitrovic
- W Mochan
- Roderich Moessner
- Jorge Morfin
- James Nagle
- Kae Nemoto
- Dwight Neuenschwander
- Dinh Nguyen
- Joseph Niemela
- Filomena Nunes
- Vivian O'Dell
- Choo-Hiap Oh
- Ivan Oleynik
- Kostas Orginos
- David Osborn
- Feryal Ozel
- Ning Pan
- V. Adrian Parsegian
- Thomas Pedersen
- J. Pendry
- Alan Perelson
- Alexey Petrov
- Cedomir Petrovic
- Eli Piasetzky
- Yuan Ping
- Leonid Pismen
- Antoni Planes
- Michel Pleimling
- Matthew Poelker
- Steven Pollock
- James Proudfoot
- Gulshan Rai
- Ramamurthy Ramprasad
- Scott Ransom
- Elie Raphael
- Sean Regan
- Marcos Rigol
- Charles Roland
- Filip Ronning
- John Rumble
- Roger Rusack
- Tanusri Saha-Dasgupta
- Daniel Sanchez-Portal
- Alexander Saunders
- Stephan Schlamminger
- Ira Schwartz
- Rachel A. Segalman
- Peter Shaffer
- Eugene Shakhnovich
- Michael A Shay
- Javid Sheikh
- Mengyan Shen
- Troy Shinbrot
- Kirill Shtengel
- Irfan Siddiqi
- Daniel Sigg
- Mary Silber
- Daniel Sinars
- Patrick Slane
- Vladimir Smalyuk
- Alexei Sokolov
- Stefan Soldner-Rembold
- Todd Squires
- Richard Staley
- Frank Steglich
- Daniel Steinberg
- Richard Steinberg
- Frederick Streitz
- Liling Sun
- Eric Suraud
- Kenneth Suslick
- Damian Swift
- Charles Tahan
- Shina Tan
- Hirohisa Tanaka
- Xinfeng Tang
- Benn Tannenbaum
- Janet Tate
- Dave Thirumalai
- Edward Thomas
- Rodger Thompson
- David Toback
- Federico Toschi
- Mark Trodden
- Thomas Truskett
- Yaroslav Tserkovnyak
- Tolek Tyliszczak
- Dmitri Uzdensky
- Ilya Vekhter
- Latha Venkataraman
- Kai Vetter
- David Vitali
- Thomas Vojta
- Jelena Vuckovic
- Philip Walther
- Benjamin D. Wandelt
- Alan Weinstein
- Bernard Whiting
- Ferdinand Willeke
- Michael Wittmann
- Pieter Ten Wolde
- Michael Wright
- Xiaohua Wu
- Glen Wurden
- Vladislav Yakovlev
- Jie Yan
- Yang Yang
- Stefano Zapperi
- Zhuomin Zhang
- Xiaochao Zheng
- Michael Zudov

== 2016 ==
- Alexander Abanov
- Nicholas Abbott
- Edward Adler
- Mina Aganagic
- Giorgio Apollinari
- Ian Appelbaum
- Philip Argyres
- Harry Atwater
- Richard Averitt
- Nigel Badnell
- Thomas W. Baumgarte
- Rachel Bean
- Timothy C. Beers
- L. Douglas Bell
- Nicole Bell
- Adam Bernstein
- Sergio Bertolucci
- Andrea L. Bertozzi
- Antonio Bianconi
- Jiri Bicak
- Eric R. Bittner
- Ken Bloom
- Jose A. Boedo
- Peter Bosted
- Igal Brener
- Robert G.W. Brown
- Todd A. Brun
- Amir Caldeira
- James M. Caruthers
- Fausto Cattaneo
- Simon Catterall
- Christopher T. Chantler
- Hui Chen
- Yong P. Chen
- Vladimir Chernyak (scientist)
- Junhan Cho
- Kyeongjae Cho
- Daniel Chung
- Marcus Cicerone
- Stéphane Coutu
- Csaba Csáki
- Raissa M. D'Souza
- Christine Darve
- Gabor David
- Christine Davies
- Matthew Davis
- William Detmold
- Aaron Dinner
- Günther Dissertori
- Aaron Dominguez
- Megan Donahue
- Axel Drees
- Nirit Dudovich
- Yossef Elabd
- Robert Endres
- Peter Engels
- Hongyou Fan
- Hume A. Feldman
- Donglai Feng
- Gregory A. Fiete
- Patrick Fox
- Dieter Frekers
- Valery V. Frolov
- Makoto C. Fujiwara
- Herbert O. Funsten
- Laura Gagliardi
- John Galambos
- Cameron Guy Geddes
- Ahmed Ghoniem
- George N. Gibson
- Vladimir Glebov (scientist)
- Punit Gohil
- Steven Goldfarb
- Maarten F. Golterman
- Paolo Gondolo
- Michael S. Gordon
- Gianluca Gregori
- Ilya Gruzberg
- Robert Grzywacz
- Vitalyi Gusev
- Richard L. Gustavsen
- Jack Harris
- Charles Henderson
- Laura Heyderman
- Sascha Hilgenfeldt
- Christopher Hill
- Ann Hornschemeier
- Kalina Hristova
- Hui Hu
- Omar A. Hurricane
- Muhammad M. Hussain
- Andrew Hutton
- Subramanian Iyer
- Felix M. Izrailev
- Jamal Jalilian-Marian
- Anderson Janotti
- Paul Johnson
- Ann Hornschemeier
- Ezekiel Johnston-Halperin
- Mercouri Kanatzidis
- Andreas Karch
- Brian Keating
- Richard L. Kelley
- Krzysztof Kempa
- Hugh Kendrick
- Sinan Keten
- Young-June Kim
- Tobias Kippenberg
- John Kitching
- John L. Kline
- Kimitoshi Kono
- Joel D Kress
- Andreas Kreyssig
- Guruswamy Kumaraswamy
- Steven Lambert
- Andrew J. Landahl
- Michael Landry (scientist)
- Karol Lang
- Eric Lauga
- Adrian Lee
- Ho Nyung Lee
- Amiram Leviatan
- Laura H. Lewis
- Laurent Limat
- Yueqiang Liu
- J. Timothy Londergan
- Micah Lowenthal
- Robert Lucchese
- François Léonard
- Nina Markovic
- Beverley McKeon
- Frédéric Merkt
- Jianwei "John" Miao
- Angelos Michaelides
- Michiko G. Minty
- Andrea Morello
- Miguel Mostafá
- Anthony Murphy
- Pietro Musumeci (scientist)
- Ágnes Mócsy
- Ilya Nemenman
- Keir Neuman
- Brian W. O'Shea
- Martin Oberlack
- Satoshi Okamoto
- Kathryn M. Olesko
- William D. Oliver
- Scott M. Oser
- Stephen Padalino
- Demetrios T. Papageorgiou
- David H. Parker
- Matteo Pasquali
- Hiranya Peiris
- Suhithi M. Peiris
- Natalia Perkins
- Peter Petreczky
- Thomas Pfeifer
- Andreas Piepke
- Sergio Pirozzoli
- Monica Plisch
- Mason Porter
- Marek Potemski
- John D. Prestage
- Clement Pryke
- Jean-Michel Raimond
- Ganpati Ramanath
- Sriram Ramaswamy
- Wouter-Jan Rappel
- George H. Rawitscher
- Mike Reeks
- Jason Reese
- Cindy Regal
- Mary T. Rodgers
- Sven Rogge
- Leonid Rokhinson
- J. Michael Roney
- Ricardo Ruiz
- Zvi Rusak
- Greg Salamo
- Pierre Savard (scientist)
- Sandro Scandolo
- Charles A. Schmuttenmaer
- Athena S. Sefat
- Robin Selinger
- Peter N. Shanahan
- Spencer Sherwin
- Eva Silverstein
- Marc Simon
- Ivan Smalyukh
- Evgenya Smirnova-Simakov
- Sunil V. Somalwar
- Jonathan E. Spanier
- Ulrich Sperhake
- Donald A. Spong
- Keivan Stassun
- Robin T. Stebbins
- Christoph Steier
- Mathias B. Steiner
- Timothy J. Stelzer
- John Stewart
- Handong Sun
- Sean Sun
- Rebecca A. Surman
- Bruce R. Sutherland
- Noboru Takeuchi
- Jay X. Tang
- Xiao Tang
- Humberto Terrones
- John Texter
- Rebecca Thompson
- James E. Trebes
- John Tsamopoulos
- Emanuel Tutuc
- Wim Ubachs
- Jeffrey Urbach
- Maria-Roser Valentí
- Michele Vallisneri
- Maria Varela
- Kalman Varga
- Massimo Vergassola
- Matthieu Verstraete
- Feng Wang
- Haiyan Wang
- Xue-Bin Wang
- James A. Warren
- James H. Werner
- Daniel Whiteson
- Gary Wiederrecht
- Stephane Willocq
- Jianzhong Wu
- Mingming Wu
- Alan Wuosmaa
- John Wygant
- Qikun Xue
- Hiroshi Yamada (scientist)
- Judith C. Yang
- Alexander L. Yarin
- Steven W. Yates
- Peide "Peter" Ye
- Edward Yu
- Roberto Zenit
- Xixiang Zhang
- Xingjiang Zhou
- Jian-Xin Zhu
- Richard W. Ziolkowski
- Hartmut Zohm
- Kathryn Zurek
- Igor Zutic
- Martin Zwierlein

== 2017 ==
- Chris Adami
- Deji Akinwande
- Alexander V. Aleksandrov
- Ahmed Ali
- Gabrielle D. Allen
- N. R. Aluru
- Adrian Bachtold
- Radha Bahukutumbi
- John G. Baker
- Nathan R. Barton
- Christian W. Bauer
- Matthias Bauer
- Anatoly B. Belonoshko
- William A. Bertsche
- Susan K. Blessing
- Mischa Bonn
- Jean Pierre Boon
- Stephen J. Brice
- Alexey Burov
- Christopher David Carone
- Michael P. Carpenter
- Thomas L. Carroll
- David B. Cassidy
- Lou Cattafesta
- Suman Chakraborty
- Alexander L. Chernyshev
- Andy Christianson
- William Collins
- John Wesley Cooper
- Jolien D. Creighton
- Enrique Del Barco
- Hui Deng
- Maynard Dewey
- H. Thomas Diehl
- Jeff Eldredge
- Thomas H. Epps, III
- Charles R. Evans (scientist)
- Lisa L. Everett
- Rafael M. Fernandes
- Richard Brian Firestone
- Christopher J. Fontes
- Anatoly I. Frenkel
- Dustin H. Froula
- Brent T. Fultz
- Michelle Girvan
- Bruce E. Gnade
- William H. Goldstein
- Ramin Golestanian
- Toshiyuki Gotoh
- Markus Greiner
- Eberhard K. U. Gross
- Peter H. Grutter
- Francisco Guinea
- Victor Gurarie
- Eric Keith Gustafson
- Carlos J. Gutierrez
- Zoran Hadzibabic
- Nancy M. Haegel
- Kawtar Hafidi
- Paul H. Halpern
- Igor Herbut
- Michael A. Hermele
- Bjoern Hof
- Georg Heinz Hoffstaetter
- Daniel Holz
- Dan Hooper
- Han Htoon
- Dragan Huterer
- William Thomas Mark Irvine
- Paul Janmey
- Debdeep Jena
- Neil F. Johnson
- Mihailo R. Jovanovic
- Keith A. Julien
- Daniel N. Kasen
- Toshihiko Kawano
- R. Scott Kemp
- Paul Kent
- Munira Khalil
- Ho-Young Kim
- Kee Hoon Kim
- Robert K. Kirkwood
- Lou Kondic
- Alex Kovner
- Vitaly V. Kresin
- Reiner Kruecken
- Chun Ning Lau
- Harvey S. Leff
- Adam K. Leibovich
- John W. Lewellen
- W. Vincent Liu
- Stefan Gregory Llewellyn Smith
- Wolfgang Losert
- Norbert Lutkenhaus
- Zhenqiang Ma
- Mikhail A. Malkov
- Vuk Mandic
- Stephane Mangin
- Thomas R. Mattsson
- Morgan May
- Michael A. McGuire
- Daniel McKinsey
- Raffaele Mezzenga
- Sushanta Mitra
- Niels Asger Mortensen
- Maxim Mostovoy
- Richard A. Moyer
- Eduardo R. Mucciolo
- Reshmi Mukherjee
- Shuichi Murakami (scientist)
- Janice Lynn Musfeldt
- James Alan Musser
- James Richard Myra
- David B. Newell
- Yasunori Nomura
- Rachid Nouicer
- Corey Shane O'Hern
- Patrick I. Oden
- Yuval Oreg
- Miguel Orszag
- Gerardo Ortiz
- Zhe Yu J. Ou
- Johnpierre Paglione
- Ras B. Pandey
- Manfred Paulini
- Jonathan P. Pelz
- Thomas T. Perkins
- Aaron Thomas Pierce
- Fulvia Pilat
- Nikolai Pogorelov
- Frank C. Porter
- Mark Antonio Prelas
- Chilakamarri Rangacharyulu
- Juergen Rapp
- Margaret D. Reid
- Pedro M. Reis
- Dmitry Reznik
- William Ryu
- Raul Sanchez
- Andrei Sanov
- Rachel E. Scherr
- Daniel Schwartz (scientist)
- Tommy Sewell (scientist)
- A. Surjalal Sharma
- Lev Shchur
- Takasada Shibauchi
- Ernst Paul Sichtermann
- Laura Beth Smilowitz
- Michael Solomon
- Jun S. Song
- Bernardo Spagnolo
- Roxanne Patricia Springer
- Eric Stach
- Christopher M. Stafford
- Robert L. Stamps
- Francis Starr
- Peter Steinberg (scientist)
- Gunter Steinmeyer
- Christian Stoeckl
- David M. Strom
- Hermann Suderow
- Nicholas B. Suntzeff
- Albert A. Talin
- Jacob Taylor
- James W. Taylor
- Mauricio Terrones
- Timo Thonhauser
- Xiao-Min Tong
- Stuart A. Trugman
- Surya P. Vanka
- Edo Waks
- Christopher William Walter
- Kang-Lung Wang
- Ziqiang Wang
- Risa Wechsler
- Roland Wester
- Steffen Wirth
- Lilia M. Woods
- Rosemary Wyse
- Yang Xia (scientist)
- Susanne F. Yelin
- Han Woong Yeom
- Vivien Zapf
- Remco G. T. Zegers
- Chuanwei Zhang
- Jun Zhang
- Yong Zhang
- Shining Zhu
- Slobodan Zumer

== 2018 ==
- Adekunle Adeyeye
- Rana X. Adhikari
- Brian J. Albright
- Moskov Amarian
- Yoichi Ando
- Carol E. Anway
- Alexandre Arenas
- David S. Armstrong
- Egor Babaev
- Diola Bagayoko
- Neil J. Balmforth
- Marjorie G. Bardeen
- Lisa Barsotti
- Martin Bazant
- Rainer D. Beck
- Andreas Becker (scientist)
- Lorin X. Benedict
- Alexandre Blais
- Stefan Boettcher
- Scott K. Bogner
- Robert Boily
- Kerstin A. Borras
- Christoph Bostedt
- Eric Brewe
- Francoise Brochard-Wyart
- Kenneth R. Brown
- Elizabeth Buckley-Geer
- Helen Caines
- Paul Cassak
- Miguel A. Cazalilla
- Claudia Cenedese
- Siu-Wai Chan
- Benjamin Chandran
- Shailesh Chandrasekharan
- Kookrin Char
- Jacqueline H. Chen
- Gilbert Chu
- Ming-Chung Chu
- John C. Crocker
- Xi Dai
- Karen E. Daniels
- Ken Elder
- Henriette D. Elvang
- Robin D. Erbacher
- Lisa Fauci
- Amy K. Flatten
- Michael M. Fogler
- Mark D Foster
- Daniel J. Friedman
- Stephen A. Fulling
- Jason S. Gardner
- Eric J. Gawiser
- Philippe R. Ghosez
- David J. Goldhaber-Gordon
- Nir Goldman
- Vicki H. Grassian
- Amy L. R. Graves
- Salman Habib
- Gaute Hagen
- Timothy Halpin-Healy
- Ryan C. Hayward
- Johannes Hecker Denschlag
- Jennifer Hollingsworth
- Jiangping Hu
- Taku Izubuchi
- Pablo Jarillo-Herrero
- Brian J. Jensen
- Sangyong Jeon
- Kate L. Jones
- Alisher S. Kadyrov
- Hae-Young Kee
- Brian K. Kendrick
- Cynthia E. Keppel
- Nazir P. Kherani
- Lawrence E. Kidder
- Peggy A. Kidwell
- Derek F. Kimball
- Mimi A. R. Koehl (physicist)
- Uwe R. Kortshagen
- Richard C. Lanza
- Shu Ping Lau
- Heather J. Lewandowski
- Xiuling Li
- Chen-Yu Liu
- Hoi-Kwong Lo
- Duncan Lorimer
- David K. Lubensky
- Andreas W. Ludwig
- Andrew G. MacPhee
- Lars Bojer Madsen
- Michael C. Martin
- Nadya Mason
- Masaaki Matsuda
- Sarah B. McKagan
- Ernesto A. Medina (physicist)
- Mikhail V. Medvedev
- Noureddine Melikechi
- Aditi Mitra
- Emilia Morosan
- Conal Murray
- Donna Naples
- Abhay P. Narayan
- Takashi Nishikawa
- Teri W. Odom
- Grazyna Odyniec
- Hendrik Ohldag
- Wilma K. Olson
- Mark J. Oreglia
- Chinedum Osuji
- Jeffrey C. Owrutsky
- Willie J. Padilla
- Paul Padley
- M. Parans Paranthaman
- Enrico Ramirez-Ruiz
- Stephen C. Rand
- Oscar A. Rondon-Aramayo
- Jennifer L. Ross
- Clancy Rowley
- David Saintillan
- David P. Saltzberg
- Bruce D. Scott
- Trevor J. Sears
- Robert J. Semper
- Yasuhiko Sentoku
- Tatyana O. Sharpee
- Evan D. Skillman
- Richard G. Spencer
- Marcus Spradlin
- Ingrid Stairs
- Andrew Strominger
- Ignacio Taboada
- Keiji Tanaka (scientist)
- Wolfgang R. Theobald
- Alexander Thomas
- James K. Thompson
- Patrice E. A. Turchi
- Alexander Valishev
- Jean-Luc Vay
- Vincenzo Vitelli
- LianTao Wang
- Mingsheng Wei
- Congjun Wu
- Junqiao Wu
- Ying Wu (scientist)
- Qihua Xiong
- Ping Yang
- Shu Yang
- Chun-Yeol You
- Igor A. Zaliznyak
- Anatoli Zelenski
- Tanya Zelevinsky
- Ruiqin Zhang
- Nikolay Zheludev
- Jure Zupan

== 2019 ==
- Wendy Adams
- Rajeev Ahuja
- Félicie Albert
- Husam N. Alshareef
- James G. Analytis
- Sonia Bacca
- Vijay Balasubramanian
- Jiming Bao
- Daniel Bazin
- Michael Begel
- Michael Markus Benedikt
- Mona Inesa Berciu
- Luc B. Bergé
- Katia Bertoldi
- Anand Bhattacharya
- Jens Biegert
- Daniel Boer
- Tulika Bose
- James William Bray
- Christoph Bruder
- Jasna Brujic
- Kimberly Susan Budil
- Richard J. Buttery
- Luciano Castillo
- Michael L. Chabinyc
- Pavel Cheben
- Xi Chen
- Yu-Ao Chen
- Steven Mark Christensen
- Luisa Cifarelli
- Amy L. Connolly
- Alessandra Corsi
- Gavin E. Crooks
- Wei Cui
- Mahananda Dasgupta
- Markus Deserno
- James H. Dickerson
- Zvonimir Dogic
- Shengwang Du
- Wenhui Duan
- Evgeny Epelbaum
- Tatiana Erukhimova
- Jutta E. Escher
- Matthew J. Evans
- Michael Lawrence Falk
- Flavio H. Fenton
- Francesca Ferlaino
- Joseph Angelo Formaggio
- Cristiano Galbiati
- Francois Gallaire
- Pascale Garaud
- Andrew Albert Geraci
- Stefan Gerhardt
- Yuri Gershtein
- Andrea M. Ghez
- Andrei Gritsan
- Stephen J. Hagen
- George Haller
- Hendrik F. Hamann
- Stephanie B. Hansen
- Ronald Hanson
- Kristjan Haule
- Hans W. Herrmann
- Hans Hilgenkamp
- George Wei-Shu Hou
- Gregory Gershom Howes
- Scott Chia Hsu
- Can-Ming Hu
- Patrick Huber
- Eric R. Hudson
- Alan James Hurd
- Gianluca Iaccarino
- Sohrab Ismail-Beigi
- Saurabh W. Jha
- Ying Jiang
- Anne Juel
- Robert A. Kaindl
- Rituparna Kanungo
- Matt Kim
- Tsuyoshi Kimura
- Matthias Friedrich Kling
- Markus Klute
- Robert Michael Konik
- Carolyn C. Kuranz
- Brian J. LeRoy
- Theodora Leventouri
- Matthias Ulf Liepe
- Anke Lindner
- Donghui Lu
- M. Lisa Manning
- Robert D. Mathieu
- José Fernando F Mendes
- Hope Michelsen
- Saskia Mioduszewski
- Stephen Monismith
- Holger Mueller
- Harry Norman Nelson
- Yasushi Ono
- Masaki Oshikawa
- Aydogan Ozcan
- Kent Paschke
- Matjaz Perc
- Jason R. Petta
- Raymond Jeffrey Phaneuf
- Silvia Picozzi
- Leanne C. Pitchford
- Viktor A. Podolskiy
- Katherine Prestridge
- Ji Qiang
- Sofia Quaglioni
- Idalia Ramos
- William Davis Ratcliff
- Jocelyn Samantha Read
- Juan M. Restrepo
- Gian-Marco Rignanese
- Harry Francis Robey
- Alexander Romanenko
- Dmitri A. Romanov
- Connie Barbara Roth
- Mary Beth Ruskai
- Mel S. Sabella
- Sayeef Salahuddin
- Omar A. Saleh
- Christian Santangelo
- B. S. Sathyaprakash
- Frank Schmidt
- Gerd E. Schroeder-Turk
- James Patarasp Sethna
- Joshua W. Shaevitz
- Peter Shawhan
- Uri Shumlak
- Carlos Silva
- Ivo S. Souza
- Dong Su
- Asle Sudbo
- Bernd Surrow
- Jack A. Syage
- Oleg V. Tchernyshyov
- Alexandre Tkatchenko
- Michael F. Toney
- Megan T. Valentine
- Richard G. Van de Water
- Maxim G. Vavilov
- Nikolay Vinokurov
- Smitha Vishveshwara
- Petia Vlahovska
- Dimitris Vlassopoulos
- Tracy John Vogler
- Bryan Vogt
- Anastasia Volovich
- Sarah L. Waters
- Charles Albert Weatherford
- Peter Bernard Weichman
- Neal Weiner
- Anne Elisabeth White
- Marion M. White
- Claus Wilke
- David A. Williams
- Chee Wei Wong
- Jing Xia
- Huili Grace Xing
- Hongqi Xu
- Ting Xu
- Jing Zhang
- Xin Zhang
- Mingfei Zhou
- Ye Zhou
- Xiaoqin Zou

== 2020 ==
- Jan Aarts
- Snezhana I. Abarzhi
- Katherine Aidala
- Paul R. Anderson
- Almudena Arcones
- John Ballato
- Emanuela Barberis
- Stephen D. Bartlett
- Geoffrey S. D. Beach
- Carlo Beenakker
- Elena Belova
- Richard L. Berger
- Claude Bourbonnais
- Bernd Bruegmann
- James H. Buckley
- Kevin Burkett
- Guido Caldarelli
- Roger D. Carlini
- Gerbrand Ceder
- Martin Centurion
- Luis Chacon
- Yann R. Chemla
- Li-Jen Chen
- Geraldine L. Cochran
- Itai Cohen
- Sarah Cousineau
- Richard Craster
- Alexander D. Cronin
- James P. Cryan
- Ruth A. Daly
- James R. Danielson
- Lucilla De Arcangelis
- Carlos Henrique De Brito Cruz
- Emanuela Del Gado
- Jason A. Detwiler
- Sanjeev Dhurandhar
- Ronald Dickman
- Laurent Divol
- Bhaskar Dutta
- Karl M.Ecklund
- Rouven Essig
- Andrea Favalli
- Max E. Fenstermacher
- Marivi Fernandez-Serra
- Brian Fields
- Lucy Frear Fortson
- Seth Fraden
- Scott Franklin
- Ashot Gasparian
- Massimo Giovannozzi
- Feliciano Giustino
- Alexander Glaser
- Ajay Gopinathan
- Alexey V. Gorshkov
- Richard Gran
- Gregory M. Grason
- Anna Grassellino
- Houyang Guo
- Hartmut Haeffner
- Michael F. Hagan
- Zahra Hazari
- Sean J. Hearne
- Laura Henriques
- Michel Houssa
- Wenbing Hu
- Yun Hang Hu
- Daniel S. Hussey
- Nicholas Hutchins
- Arthi Jayaraman
- Jinfeng Jia
- Javier Junquera
- Suzanne Amador Kane
- Richard B. Kaner
- Manoj Kaplinghat
- Eun-Ah Kim
- Israel Klich
- Mathias Kläui
- Corinna Kollath
- Ilya Krivorotov
- Shelly Rae Lesher
- Tim Lieuwen
- Maria Antonietta Loi
- Cecilia Lunardini
- Mahesh K. Mahanthappa
- Suliana Manley
- Scott X. Mao
- Alison L. Marsden
- Alberto A. Martinez
- Reina Maruyama
- Sergei Maslov
- Harsh Mathur
- Andrey B Matsko
- Robert F. McDermott
- Ralph Menikoff
- Yuri Mishin
- Bedangadas Mohanty
- Michael H. Moloney
- Gregory W. Moore
- Yasunobu Nakamura
- Sae W. Nam
- Onuttom Narayan
- Art J Nelson
- Kaixuan Ni
- Ruth Nussinov
- Brian C. Odom
- Vadim Oganesyan
- Artem R Oganov
- Andrea Palounek
- Arun Paramekanti
- Raghuveer Parthasarathy
- Barbara Pasquini
- Stefano Profumo
- Nini Pryds
- Jonathan F. Reichert
- Günter Reiter
- David Richards
- Heike Riel
- Kenneth P. Rodbell
- Vincent Gerald J. Rogers
- Sylvie Roke
- J. Ryan Rygg
- Bidhan Chandra Saha
- Rita M. Sambruna
- Mayly Sanchez
- Edl Schamiloglu
- Dominik A. Schneble
- Susan M. Scott
- Raymond Shaw
- Olga Shishkina
- Mário G. Silveirinha
- Jennifer Sinclair Curtis
- Nikolai Sinitsyn
- Dirk Smit
- Scott Smith
- Panagiotis Spentzouris
- Spitkovsky Anatoly
- Jeff Squier
- Steinar Stapnes
- Oleg Starykh
- Joseph E. Subotnik
- Chao Sun
- Kandice Tanner
- Yoshinori Tokura
- Blas Pedro Uberuaga
- Patricia Vahle
- Dieter Vollhardt
- Jian-Ping Wang
- Deborah K. Watson
- Thorsten Weber
- Jonathan David Weinstein
- Ingo Wiedenhoever
- Richard J. Wiener
- Fred E. Wietfeldt
- Belinda J. Wilkes
- Carol A. Wilkinson
- Dao Xiang
- Xiaodong Xu
- Lan Yang
- Wang Yao
- Peter Zapol
- Eugene Zaretsky
- Jun Zhu
- Eric D. Zimmerman
- Shelly Lesher

== 2021 ==
- Kaustubh Agashe
- Emilio Artacho
- Kétévi Adiklè Assamagan
- Faical Azaiez
- Oliver K. Baker
- Stefan W. Ballmer
- Arun Bansil
- Denis Bartolo
- Dani S. Bassett
- Larry R. Baylor
- Pierre Berini
- Antony N. Beris
- Lydia Bieri
- Geoffrey A. Blake
- Dave H. A. Blank
- Daniel Bonn
- Dimitri Bourilkov
- Lydia Bourouiba
- Eric Nathaniel Brown
- Jean Carlson
- Patrick Charbonneau
- Jerry M. Chow
- Ibrahim I. Cissé
- Cristiano Ciuti
- Aurora E. Clark
- Jason Clark
- Aashish Clerk
- Kyle Cranmer
- Catherine Hirshfeld Crouch
- Beth A. Cunningham
- Andrew J. Daley
- José María De Teresa
- Michael Dennin
- Tilo Doeppner
- Christian Forssén
- John Edison Foster
- Giuliano Franchetti
- Gerardo Herrera-Corral
- Lawrence Gibbons
- Naomi S. Ginsberg
- Alexander Golubov
- Enrique D. Gomez
- Adrian M. Gozar
- David Gracias
- Laura Grego
- Subhadeep Gupta
- Mohammad Hafezi
- Andrew F. Heckler
- Thomas Hemmick
- Linda S. Hirst
- Andrew Houck
- Christine Hrenya
- Sungwoo Hwang
- Maria Iavarone
- Takeyasu Ito
- Kohei Itoh
- Mary B. James
- Liang Jiang
- Clifford V. Johnson
- Gerceida E. Adams-Jones
- Matthew P. Juniper
- Helmut G. Katzgraber
- Gaurav Khanna
- Jungsang Kim
- Alexander Kramida
- Peter Kuchment
- Aaron Gilad Kusne
- François Légaré
- David R. Leibrandt
- Benjamin L. Lev
- Dov Levine
- Xiaosong Li
- Yury Litvinov
- Hong Liu
- Alberto Loarte
- Andrew R. Lupini
- Tammy Ma
- Kin Fai Mak
- Jamie L. Manson
- Christina Markert
- Christopher L. Martin
- Lane W. Martin
- Alan J. H. McGaughey
- Maura McLaughlin
- Zia Mian
- Arlene Modeste Knowles
- Nathan A. Moody
- Yamir Moreno
- Lowell Morgan
- Swagato Mukherjee
- Salah Obayya
- Chad Orzel
- Valerie K. Otero
- Hanhee Paik
- Christos Panagopoulos
- Casey Papovich
- Moon Jeong Park
- Joel R. Parriott
- Thomas Peacock
- Katherine K. Perkins
- Kristin A. Persson
- Charles C. Polly
- Vivek M. Prabhu
- Soren Prestemon
- Geoff Pryde
- Qing Qin
- Anna M. Quider
- Srinivas Raghu
- Venkatachalam Ramaswamy
- Ainissa Ramirez
- Claudia Ratti
- Paul E. Reimer
- Peter W. A. Roming
- Steven James Rose
- Matthew S. Rosen
- Todd Satogata
- Monika Schleier-Smith
- Piet O. Schmidt
- Jörg Schumacher
- Alice Shapley
- Amy Q. Shen
- Kyle M. Shen
- Steinn Sigurðsson
- Michelle Yvonne Simmons
- Maksim Skorobogatiy
- Fernando Sols
- Jeff Sonier
- Artemisia Spyrou
- Michael Swisdak
- Gil Travish
- Tommaso Treu
- Christy S. Tyberg
- Arpita Upadhyaya
- Bernhard Urbaszek
- Martin van Hecke
- Jacobus Verbaarschot
- Madeline Wade
- Yau W. Wah
- Aleksandra Walczak
- Jigang Wang
- YuHuang Wang
- Alan Eli Willner
- Gillian Wilson
- Lindley Winslow
- Mingzhong Wu
- Matthieu Wyart
- Hongjun Xiang
- Xueqiao Xu
- Wanli Yang
- Hong Yao
- Bilge Can Yildiz
- Yu Dapeng
- Huiqiu Yuan
- Sam Zeller
- Bei Zeng

== 2022 ==
- Kevork N. Abazajian
- Wague Ahmadou
- Alfonso M. Albano
- Michael G. Albrow
- Stephon Haigh Solomon Alexander
- Andrei Alexandru
- Ehud Altman
- Arezoo Ardekani
- Paulo Arratia
- Crystal D. Bailey
- Dan Bardayan
- Ramón S. Barthelemy
- Andrei Bernevig
- Christoph Boehme
- Kenneth S. Burch
- Juan Ramon Burciaga
- Marcos (Danny) Caballero
- Wesley C. Campbell
- Fabrizio Carbone
- Jean Bio Chabi Orou
- Chong-Sun Chu
- Jacinta C. Conrad
- Jodi Cooley
- Jose Crespo Lopez-Urrutia
- Gianaurelio Cuniberti
- Nir Davidson
- Franklin Dollar
- Olga Dudko
- Eric Robert Dufresne
- Emily E. Edwards
- Juan Estrada
- Renee Fatemi
- Alexei V. Fedotov
- Steven Flammia
- Zoltan Fodor
- Tara Fortier
- Santo Fortunato
- Anna Frebel
- Raymond Frey
- Jonathan R. Friedman
- Carla Fröhlich
- Liang Fu
- Ibiyinka Fuwape
- Maia Garcia Vergniory
- Clayton A. Gearhart
- Nuh Gedik
- Jose Gordillo Arias de Saavedra
- Thomas Gregor
- Leo Gross
- Or Hen
- Angela R. Hight Walker
- Michael Hildreth
- Mary Y. P. Hockaday
- Philip Hofmann
- James Hone
- Jorge Íñiguez
- Mustapha Ishak-Boushaki
- Prashant K. Jain
- Mona Jarrahi
- Robert Jeraj
- Michael B. Johnston
- Scott Kable
- Eva Kanso
- Justin C. Kasper
- Keita Kawabe
- Craig Kletzing
- Michael Kohl
- Frank Koppens
- LaShanda Korley
- Lena F. Kourkoutis
- Laird H. Kramer
- Per Kraus
- Srinivas Krishnagopal
- Andrea Lynn Kritcher
- Matt Landreman
- Kyung-Jin Lee
- Daniela Leitner
- Alex Levchenko
- Lu Li
- Huey-Wen Lin
- Nicole Lloyd-Ronning
- Maria Longobardi
- Nuno Loureiro
- Andrew D. Ludlow
- Roman Lutchyn
- Alysia D. Marino
- Joseph D. Martin
- Paul Martini
- David A. Mazziotti
- Elizabeth McCutchan
- Malcolm I. McMahon
- Zetian Mi
- Ling Miao
- Giovanna Morigi
- Smadar Naoz
- Shobhana Narasimhan
- Robert J. Nemiroff
- Ni Ni
- Eve Ostriker
- Nicholas T. Ouellette
- Vittorio Paolone
- Jiwoong Park
- Gloria Platero
- Eric Pop
- Maxim Pospelov
- Claude A. Pruneau
- Siddharth Ramachandran
- Sumathi Rao
- Rae M Robertson-Anderson
- Radu Roiban
- Mark Steven Rzchowski
- Arvinder Sandhu
- Srikanth Sastry
- Björn Peter Schenke
- Friederike Schmid
- Wolfgang Schröder
- David Schuster
- Fredrick Hampton Seguin
- Ronnie Shepherd
- Dava Sobel
- Rolando D. Somma
- Andrew Steiner
- Gregory J. Stephens
- Michael Tarbutt
- Richard P. Taylor
- Jesse Thaler
- Jean-Luc Thiffeault
- Matthew C. Thompson
- Evelyn Thomson
- Oskar Vafek
- Sergio O. Valenzuela
- Geoffrey K. Vallis
- Devaraj R. M. van der Meer
- Michael Van Zeeland
- Lieven M. K. Vandersypen
- Rama K. Vasudevan
- Lynn M. Walker
- Donnell Walton
- Yifang Wang
- Mitchell Wayne
- Louise Willingale
- Paul Woafo
- Daniel Worledge
- Di Xiao
- Yugui Yao
- Jaehoon Yu
- Nicolas Yunes
- Tamer A. Zaki
- Roya Zandi
- Hui Zhai
- Gang Zhang
- Shuang Zhang
- Weiping Zhang
- Junjie Zhu
- Lei Zhu
- Eva Zurek

== 2023 ==
- Agostino Marinelli
- Christine A. Aidala
- Javier Aizpurua
- Brian M. Andersen
- Anton Andreev
- Arif Babul
- Reba M. Bandyopadhyay
- Erez Berg
- Chandrashekhara M Bhat
- Ginestra Bianconi
- Sibani Lisa Biswal
- Jennifer Blue
- Alexandra Boltasseva
- Mario Francisco Borunda
- James S. Bullock
- Anton Burkov
- Fiona J. Burnell
- Nicholas P. Butch
- Claudio Campagnari
- Paola Cappellaro
- Donald C. Chang
- Yanne K. Chembo
- Laura I. Clarke
- Amalia I. Coldea
- Radu Coldea
- David A. Craig
- Linda Cummings
- Kausik S Das
- Moumita Das
- Cory R. Dean
- Adolfo del Campo
- Dean M. DeLongchamp
- Sarah Demers
- Alexandre Deur
- Daniel Dolan
- Davide Donadio
- Bérengère Dubrulle
- Sophia Economou
- Adrienne L. Erickcek
- Alberto Fernandez-Nieves
- Laura Finzi
- Frederico Fiuza
- Dillon D. Fong
- László Forró
- Pietro Gambardella
- Bharathram Ganapathisubramani
- Maria Gatu Johnson
- Dennice F. Gayme
- Franz Josef Giessibl
- Irvy Gledhill
- Vernita D. Gordon
- Frank R. Graziani
- Eilam Gross
- Wei Guo
- Kaden Hazzard
- Hong-Jian He
- Michael C Heaven
- Katrin Heitmann
- Per Helander
- Manfred Helm
- William Raphael Hix
- Jonathan Home
- David L. Hu
- Guohan Hu
- Kerwyn Casey Huang
- Christian Iliadis
- Michael Jackson
- Ahren Jasper
- H. Pirouz Kavehpour
- Aditya Khair
- Jens Koch
- Nikhil Ashok Koratkar
- Jeffrey Kovac
- Boris Kozinsky
- John Lajoie
- Mark Lancaster
- Mounir Laroussi
- Don S Lemons
- Chaoxing Liu
- Laura Na Liu
- Samuel E. Lofland Jr.
- Marie Lopez del Puerto
- Maxim Lyutikov
- Xiongfeng Ma
- Lorin Swint Matthews
- Manyalibo J. Matthews
- Steven J. May
- John A McGreevy
- Timothy A. McKay
- Pankaj Mehta
- Vinod Menon
- Andreas Metz
- Jami Valentine Miller
- Andriy Nevidomskyy
- Irina Novikova
- Andrzej Michal Oles
- Bradley D. Olsen
- Philip A Parilla
- Felix I. Parra
- Cheng-Zhi Peng
- Harald Pfeiffer
- Tilman Plehn
- Marco Polini
- Rodney Dewayne Priestley
- Dmitry A. Pushin
- Cheng-Wei Qiu
- Caterina Riconda
- Adam Ritz
- Nina Rohringer
- Joseph D Romano
- James M. Rondinelli
- Artem Rudenko
- Adrienn Ruzsinszky
- Anders Ryd
- Muhammad Sahimi
- Donald C Salisbury
- Charles M. Schroeder
- Jennifer M. Schwarz
- Kartik Sheth
- Jonathan Simon
- Bram J. J. Slagmolen
- Graeme Smith
- Marcelle Soares-Santos
- Anna Stasto
- Sarah T. Stewart
- Dale E. Stille
- Greg Sun
- Kai Sun
- Krysta M. Svore
- Derek Teaney
- Aidan Thompson
- John R. Thompson
- Christopher Ticknor
- Steve Tobias
- Itzhak Tserruya
- Kathleen R. Turner
- Nagarajan Valanoor
- Adri C.T. van Duin
- Sarah Veatch
- Philip von Doetinchem
- André Walker-Loud
- C. Wesley Walter
- Xiaojun Wang
- Henry Tsz-King Wong
- Xifan Wu
- Fengnian Xia
- Liang Yang
- Alexandre Zagoskin
- Jin Zhao
- Kun Zhou
- Dominik Zumbühl
- Robert Miles Zwaska
- Gertrud Zwicknagl

== 2024 ==
- Constantia Alexandrou
- Giorgio Ambrosio
- Patrizia Azzi
- Matthew Geoffrey Baring
- Aparna Baskaran
- Emily A. Belli
- Shane Bergin
- Tanmoy Bhattacharya
- Stefano Boccaletti
- S. Alex Bogacz
- Thomas Bortfeld
- Angela Bracco
- Steven L. Brunton
- Stepan Bulanov
- Guido Burkard
- Justin Burton
- Pierre Capel
- Brendan Casey
- Daniel Casey
- Judy Jeeyong Cha
- Zackaria Chacko
- Maria K. Chan
- Cui-Zu Chang
- Stephanie Viola Chasteen
- Joseph George Checkelsky
- John Chiaverini
- David Hsingkuo Chow
- Daniel Clark
- Valentino R. Cooper
- Douglas Cowen
- Gabor Csathy
- Areg Danagoulian
- Anthony Dinsmore
- Gail Dodge
- Alex Drlica-Wagner
- Jozef J. Dudek
- Zahra Fakhraai
- D. E. Feldman
- Nancy R. Forde
- Erwin Frey
- Kai-Mei Fu
- Kelly J. Gaffney
- Enrique Jose Galvez
- Stefano Gandolfi
- Edmundo J. Garcia-Solis
- Tahir Ghani
- Sergei Gleyzer
- Yuval Grossman
- Xiwen Guan
- Rudolf Hackl
- Jiaqing He
- Jennifer Hoffman
- Simon Martin Hooker
- Philip Fajardo Hopkins
- Danian Hu
- Yi-Min Huang
- Zhi-Feng Huang
- Taylor L. Hughes
- David Humphreys
- Takuji Ishikawa
- Kazi Rajibul Islam
- Kurt Jacobs
- Calvin W. Johnson
- Mark Kevin Jones
- Ruben Juanes
- Oana D. Jurchescu
- Christian J. Kaehler
- Yosuke Kanai
- David Kawall
- Adrian Kent
- Kinneret Keren
- Mercedeh Khajavikhan
- Gijsje Koenderink
- Kam Tuen Law
- Robert L. Leheny
- Simonetta Liuti
- Chao-Yang Lu
- Neepa T. Maitra
- Vladimir S. Malinovsky
- Rachel Mandelbaum
- Patrick Meade
- Sheng Meng
- Philip J.W. Moll
- Olexei Motrunich
- Emil Mottola
- Tim Murphy
- Prineha Narang
- Naoko Kurahashi Neilson
- Frank Noe
- Tino Nyawelo
- Boon S. Ooi
- Francesco Paesani
- Wei Pan
- Vaia Papadimitriou
- Rohit V. Pappu
- Neeti Parashar
- Carlos Paz-Soldan
- Joseph E. Pesce
- Britton Plourde
- Andrea Pocar
- Michael G. Poirier
- Anatoli Polkovnikov
- Sam Posen
- Patricia Rankin
- Dafine Ravelosona
- B.C. Regan
- Nicolas Regnault
- Alla Reznik
- Curt A. Richter
- William D. Ristenpart
- Willie S. Rockward
- Daniel Rolles
- Katemari Rosa
- Patrizia Rossi
- Du Yeol Ryu
- Tiffany S. Santos
- Vashti Sawtelle
- Mark A. Scheel
- Martin Schmaltz
- Benjamin Schuler
- M. Ángeles Serrano
- James P. Shaffer
- David Alexander Shapiro
- Tiffany Shaw
- Xavier Siemens
- Pascal Silberzan
- Raymond F. Smith
- Cherrill M. Spencer
- Nian Xiang Sun
- Ying Sun
- Kunihiko Taira
- Robert Tchitnga
- Seth Ariel Tongay
- Eric Torrence
- Jaroslav Trnka
- Rafael Verduzco
- Pavlos P. Vlachos
- Xiangang Wan
- Dajun Wang
- Howard Wilson
- Stephen D. Wilson
- Yanhong Xiao
- Jiaqiang Yan
- Choong-Shik Yoo
- Dylan Curtis Yost
- Hao Zeng
- Haidong Zhou
- Lei Zhou

== 2025 ==
- Ritesh Agarwal
- Omololu Akin-Ojo
- Alahari Navin
- Hussein Aluie
- Ariel Amir
- Ricky Lay Kee Ang
- Federico Becca
- Laura Berzak Hopkins
- José Bicov
- Daniel L. Blair
- Sergio Boixo
- Stefano Bonetti
- Bryan W. Boudouris
- Leonid Butov
- Florencia Canelli
- Anadi Canepa
- Christopher Chen
- Xuemei Cheng
- Cheng-Wei Chiang
- Chin-wen (James) Chou
- Kamal Choudhary
- Orion Ciftja
- G. Marius Clore
- Filippo Coletti
- Martha Constantinou
- Michael Cooke
- Eric Isaac Corwin
- Andrew Cross
- Elise M. Crull
- Melissa Dancy
- Siddhartha Das
- Kevin Dorfman
- Thomas Duffy
- Jorn Dunkel
- Joseph A. Dura
- Karthik Duraisamy
- Bertrand Echenard
- Hal Edwards
- Anamaria Effler
- Victor Daniel Elvira
- Fernando Febres Cordero
- Gregory D. Fuchs
- Steven Furlanetto
- Vincenzo Galdi
- Shambhu Ghimire
- Stefania Gori
- Samuel E. Gralla
- Marty Gregg
- Paul Guèye
- Thomas Hartman
- Yoshitaka Hatta
- Geoffroy Hautier
- Richard G. Hennig
- Larry Glenn Hill
- Stephen Hughes
- Shahal Ilani
- Marc Janoschek
- Douglas Jerolmack
- Anya Jones
- Ying-Jer Kao
- Genta Kawahara
- Sang-Ho Kim
- Brian Bostian Laird
- Brian T. Lantz
- Kyle Leach
- Yen-Jie Lee
- Dennis Lehmkuhl
- Mingda Li
- An-Ping Li
- Minn-Tsong Lin
- Renbao Liu
- Peter Love
- Valerio Lucarini
- Alexander Lvovsky
- John L. Lyons
- Arlene P. Maclin
- Xiaoming Mao
- Pieter Maris
- Noa Marom
- Anne Matsuura
- Matthew McCluskey
- Laura McCullough
- Benjamin McMorran
- Bronson Messer
- M. Coleman Miller
- Omar F. Mohammed
- Thierry Mora
- Saskia Mordijck
- Xavier Moya
- Giles Novak
- Seongshik Oh
- Gabriel D. Orebi Gann
- Mark A. Palmer
- Rahul Pandit
- Abid Patwa
- Manh-Huong Phan
- Vitaly Podzorov
- Stéphane Popinet
- Steve Pressé
- Breese Quinn
- Aaswath P. Raman
- Padmini Rangamani
- Graham Trevor Reed
- Yang Ren
- Stephen D. Roberson
- Julie Roche
- Paul Romatschke
- Jonathan P. Rothstein
- Gray Rybka
- Luca Salasnich
- Misao Sasaki
- Eleanor C. Sayre
- Oliver Schmitz
- Leo J. Schowalter
- Neelima Sehgal
- David Sénéchal
- Sarah Sheldon
- Lian Shen
- Mikhail Shneider
- Adrianus C. C. Sips
- Natalie Stingelin
- Toshinori Suzuki
- Julien Tailleur
- Sumanta Tewari
- Matthew Toups
- Aurora Tumino
- David Turnbull
- Jeroen van Tilborg
- Abigail Vieregg
- Lawrence L. Wald
- Haohua Wang
- Xiang-Bin Wang
- Jian Wang
- Zac Ward
- J. Mathias Weber
- Herman B. White Jr.
- Christopher Wiebe
- Mathis Wiedeking
- Stephen Kenneth Wilson
- Brian Wirth
- Wei Xiong
- Zong-Chao Yan
- Binghai Yan
- Hyunsoo Yang
- Li Yang
- Deniz D. Yavuz
- Michael Zaletel
- Fan Zhang
- Liuyan Zhao
- Qi Zhou
- Roseanna N. Zia

== See also ==
- List of American Physical Society Fellows (1921–1971)
- List of American Physical Society Fellows (1972–1997)
- List of American Physical Society Fellows (1998–2010)
