= Elizabeth McCutchan =

American physicist

Elizabeth Anne "Libby" Ricard-McCutchan is an American low-energy nuclear physicist at the Brookhaven National Laboratory whose research has included the use of gamma-ray spectroscopy to study shape changes in atomic nuclei. She is editor-in-chief of the journal Nuclear Data Sheets, and manages Brookhaven's Evaluated Nuclear Structure Data File and eXperimental Unevaluated Nuclear Data List databases.

== Education and career ==
McCutchan graduated from Wellesley College in 1999. She has a Ph.D. from Yale University, completed in 2006; her dissertation, Critical phase/shape transitions in heavy nuclei, was supervised by Richard Casten.

She joined the staff at the Brookhaven National Laboratory in 2011.

== Recognition ==
McCutchan was elected as a Fellow of the American Physical Society (APS) in 2022, after a nomination from the APS Division of Nuclear Physics, "for innovative and distinguished contributions to understanding the evolution of collectivity in heavy nuclei, critical precision experiments to test ab initio methods in light nuclei, seminal analyses of antineutrino spectra, and the development of new database tools to understand nuclear data".
