= Allen Adler (executive) =

American businessman and physicist

Edward Adler
- Education: California Institute of Technology; Princeton University
- Occupation: Businessperson

Edward Allen Adler is an American businessman and physicist, who as of 2017 was the vice president of Enterprise Technology Strategy for The Boeing Company. He is a Fellow of the American Physical Society, with the citation:

For significant scientific advancement in the application of plasma-based electronic systems to advanced space communications, and for the advancement of systems and processes necessary to transition novel physics into technical innovation, both in government and private sector capacities.
