= Laura Smilowitz =

American physicist

Laura Beth Smilowitz is an American physicist known for her development of technology that can record X-ray movies of explosions at high frame rates, and for shooting high explosives with lasers in order to synchronize their explosions with their recordings. She is a researcher at the Los Alamos National Laboratory, where she heads the Weapons Chemistry team in the Physical Chemistry and Applied Spectroscopy group.

== Education and career ==
Smilowitz graduated from Bryn Mawr College in 1987, with a bachelor's degree in physics, and completed a Ph.D. in physics at the University of California, Santa Barbara in 1993. After postdoctoral research at the Los Alamos National Laboratory and Brandeis University, she became a permanent staff member at Los Alamos in 1999.

== Recognition ==
In 2017, Smilowitz was named a Fellow of the American Physical Society (APS), after a nomination from the APS Topical Group on Shock Compression of Condensed Matter, "for pioneering radiography to study thermal explosions, including the development of both a scaled table-top dynamic radiographic facility capable of producing continuous X-ray movies of high speed events, and the triggering techniques required to observe the spontaneous onset of a thermal explosion". In the same year, she was also named a Fellow of the American Association for the Advancement of Science. She was named a Fellow of the Los Alamos National Laboratory in 2019.
