= Hui Zhai =

Chinese physicist

Hui Zhai (Chinese: 翟荟; born February 1981) is Changjiang Chair Professor of Physics at the Institute for Advanced Study, Tsinghua University. He is best known for his research in ultracold atomic physics, condensed matter physics, and machine learning.

Zhai was educated in China, receiving a B.A from Tsinghua University (2002), and a Ph.D. from the Institute for Advanced Study, Tsinghua University (2005) under the supervision of Chen-ning Yang. He served previously as a postdoctoral scholar at the Ohio-State University (2005–2007), and University of California at Berkeley (2007–2009).

He was awarded a National Natural Science Foundation of China (NSFC) award for distinguished young scholars and the RaoYutai Prize by the Chinese Physical Society. He was named a Fellow of the American Physical Society in 2022 "for contributions to cold atom physics including spin-orbit coupled BEC, orbital Feshbach resonance, and scale invariant hydrodynamics".
