= Abhay Deshpande =

Physicist and astronomer

Abhay Deshpande is a State University of New York (SUNY) Distinguished Professor in Physics and Astronomy at Stony Brook University. Deshpande was elected a fellow of the American Physical Society (division of nuclear physics) in 2014, and a fellow of the American Association for the Advancement of Science in 2021.
