= John L. Lyons =

American physical scientist

- Education: University of California, Santa Barbara
- Occupation: Physical scientist

John L. Lyons is an American physical scientist. He was named a fellow of the American Physical Society, "for fundamental contributions to the understanding and design of wide-bandgap semiconductors using first-principles methods, including strategies for semiconductor doping and for understanding and controlling exciton fine structure".
