= Aurora E. Clark =

American computational chemist

- Born: 1976 (age 49–50); Washington, USA

Academic background
- Education: BS, Chemistry, 1999, Central Washington University; Ph.D., Physical Chemistry, 2003, Indiana University Bloomington Post-doctoral Fellow, 2003-2005, Los Alamos National Laboratory
- Thesis: Molecular properties based upon projection operators: applications toward Bergman cyclization (2003)
- Website: https://chem.utah.edu/directory/clark.php

Aurora Evelyn Clark (born Dec. 12, 1976) is an American computational chemist. She is a professor in the Department of Chemistry at the University of Utah and a Fellow of the American Chemical Society, American Physical Society, and American Association for the Advancement of Science.

== Early life and education ==
Clark was born in 1976 in a small, isolated town in central Washington. As she grew up on a farm, Clark enrolled in veterinary science at Central Washington University and earned her PhD in physical chemistry at Indiana University. She then completed a postdoctoral fellowship at Los Alamos National Laboratory where she studied the chemical interactions and bonding of heavy element complexes.

== Career ==
Following her postdoctoral fellowship, Clark joined the chemistry department at Washington State University (WSU) in 2005. Upon joining the faculty, Clark used Pacific Northwest National Laboratories supercomputers to adapt Google's PageRank software into moleculaRnetworks, a cost-effective method for scientists to determine molecular shapes and chemical reactions. Following this, Clark was named the interim director of the materials science and engineering program at WSU.

As a result of her research in simulating highly radioactive systems, Clark was named deputy director of the IDREAM center, one of four DOE Energy Frontier Research Centers intended to expedite the cleanup of sites contaminated by nuclear weapons production. At the same time, she was also named a Fellow of the American Chemical Society for her "service to the nuclear/inorganic and computational chemistry communities and for her innovative research." The following year, Clark was appointed to a National Academies of Sciences, Engineering, and Medicine’s committee to develop the agenda for basic research in separations science. In 2022, Clark moved her laboratory to the Chemistry Department at the University of Utah.
