= Johnpierre Paglione =

Condensed matter physicist

- Education: Queen's University (BSc Eng, 1999), University of Toronto (MSc, 2001; PhD, 2004)
- Occupation: Physicist
- Known for: Research of quantum materials, unconventional superconductivity and correlated electron systems
- Awards: APS Fellow
- Website: Paglione Faculty Profile

Johnpierre Paglione is a condensed matter physicist and professor of physics at the University of Maryland, College Park. He is director of the Maryland Quantum Materials Center at the University of Maryland, College Park. He is known for his experimental studies of quantum materials, including unconventional superconductors, topological materials and strongly correlated electron systems. Paglione earned his PhD in physics from the University of Toronto.

== Early life and education ==
Paglione grew up in London, Ontario and attended Regina Mundi College (with Mark Kiteley who incidentally attended the University of Windsor with the Canadian writer Alex MacLeod). Paglione received a Bachelor of Science in Engineering Physics from Queen's University at Kingston in 1999, followed by a Master of Science in Physics (2001) and a PhD in Physics (2004) from the University of Toronto. His doctoral work focused on the properties of correlated electron materials.

Following his doctorate, he held a postdoctoral fellowship at the University of California, San Diego (2004–2008) supported by the Natural Sciences and Engineering Research Council of Canada (NSERC).

== Career and research ==
Paglione joined the University of Maryland faculty in 2008 as an assistant professor, was promoted to associate professor in 2013, and became full professor in 2015. His group synthesizes and studies new superconductors, topological materials, and heavy fermion compounds using low-temperature and high-magnetic-field techniques.

As director of the Maryland Quantum Materials Center, Paglione coordinates multidisciplinary research in quantum materials and organizes the international Fundamentals of Quantum Materials Winter School.

== Honors and awards ==
Fellow of the American Physical Society (2017)
