= Tino Nyawelo =

Tino Nyawelo is a Sudanese professor of physics and astronomy at the University of Utah. His research is on physics education with a focus on equity and access.

== Education and career ==
Nyawelo completed his undergraduate degree with honors at Sudan University of Science and Technology in 1996. In 1998, Nyawelo received his master's degree in theoretical high energy physics at the Abdus Salam International Center for Theoretical Physics (ICTP) in Trieste, Italy. He then went on to study at Free University of Amsterdam where he continued to research theoretical physics, receiving his PhD in 2004. After obtaining his PhD, Nyawelo conducted post doctoral research at ICTP and later the University of Utah.

== Research ==
Tino Nyawelo founded the REFUGES program in 2012, an organization that supports refugee and minority students in the Salt Lake City community. Students enrolled in the program receive tutoring, mentorship, and STEM exposure, helping promote the sciences as a future career to students that traditionally have less access to these programs. Nyawelo joined the High School Project on Astrophysics Research with Cosmics (HiSPARC) in 2020. This program began in the Netherlands in 2003, and later moved to the University of Utah in 2024 under Nyawelo's leadership. The program provides academic STEM opportunities for kids enrolled in K-12 school.

== Awards ==
Tino Nyawelo was named one of the five 2025-2026 Presidential Societal Impact Scholars by the University of Utah President Taylor Randall. Nyawelo is recognized for his efforts in facilitating STEM education access to students in the community. Nyawelo is a fellow of the American Physical Society.
