= Edward A. Baron =

Edward A. Baron Is an American astrophysicist.

Baron earned a Bachelor of Arts in physics at the University of Pennsylvania in 1980, followed by an MA and a PhD in 1985 from Stony Brook University. He taught at the University of Oklahoma from 1990 to 2023, and held the George Lynn Cross Professorship. Upon retirement, Baron was granted emeritus status.

In 2011, Baron was elected a fellow of the American Physical Society, recognized "[f]or work at the forefront of computational astrophysics, especially for important contributions to the theory of core collapse supernovae and leadership in the theory of radiative transport in stars and supernovae.
