= Qiming Zhang =

Professor of Electrical Engineering and Materials Science

Qiming Zhang is a distinguished professor of Electrical Engineering and Materials Science and Engineering at Pennsylvania State University. He is also the vice President & CTO at Strategic Polymer Sciences, Inc.

== Bibliography ==
- Large electrocaloric effect in ferroelectric polymers near room temperature, 2008,SCIENCE,321,5890,821-823,
- A dielectric polymer with high electric energy density and fast discharge speed, 2006,SCIENCE,313,5795,1887-1887
- A dielectric polymer with high electric energy density and fast discharge speed 2006, SCIENCE,313,5785,334-336
- An all-organic composite actuator material with a high dielectric constant, 2002,NATURE,419,6904,284-287
- Giant electrostriction and relaxor ferroelectric behavior in electron-irradiated poly(vinylidene fluoride-trifluoroethylene) copolymer, 1998,SCIENCE,280,5372,2101–2104
