= Mark Eriksson =

American physicist studying nano-structures

- Born: Mark Alan Eriksson

Academic background
- Education: University of Wisconsin–Madison (BS); Harvard University (AM, PhD)

Academic work
- Discipline: Physics
- Sub-discipline: Experimental physics Nanostructures; Quantum computing
- Institutions: University of Wisconsin–Madison

Mark Alan Eriksson is an American experimental physicist who specializes in experimental studies of nanostructures.

== Education ==
Eriksson earned a Bachelor of Science degree in mathematics and physics from the University of Wisconsin–Madison in 1992, followed by a Master of Science and PhD in physics from Harvard University.

== Career ==
Eriksson's research focuses on nanoscale electronic systems, quantum computing; semiconductor membranes, many-body physics and interacting electrons in low-dimensional systems; and the application of nanoelectronics in biology. Eriksson was elected a fellow of the American Association for the Advancement of Science in 2015. He is also fellow of the American Physical Society.
