= Jeffrey Urbach =

American physicist

- Education: Stanford University; Amherst College
- Scientific career
- Fields: Physics
- Workplaces: Georgetown University

Jeffrey Urbach is an American physicist, currently focusing in biophysics of cellular dynamics and mechanics and physics of Soft Matter at Georgetown University and is an Elected Fellow of the American Physical Society.
