= Sarah Cousineau =

American physicist

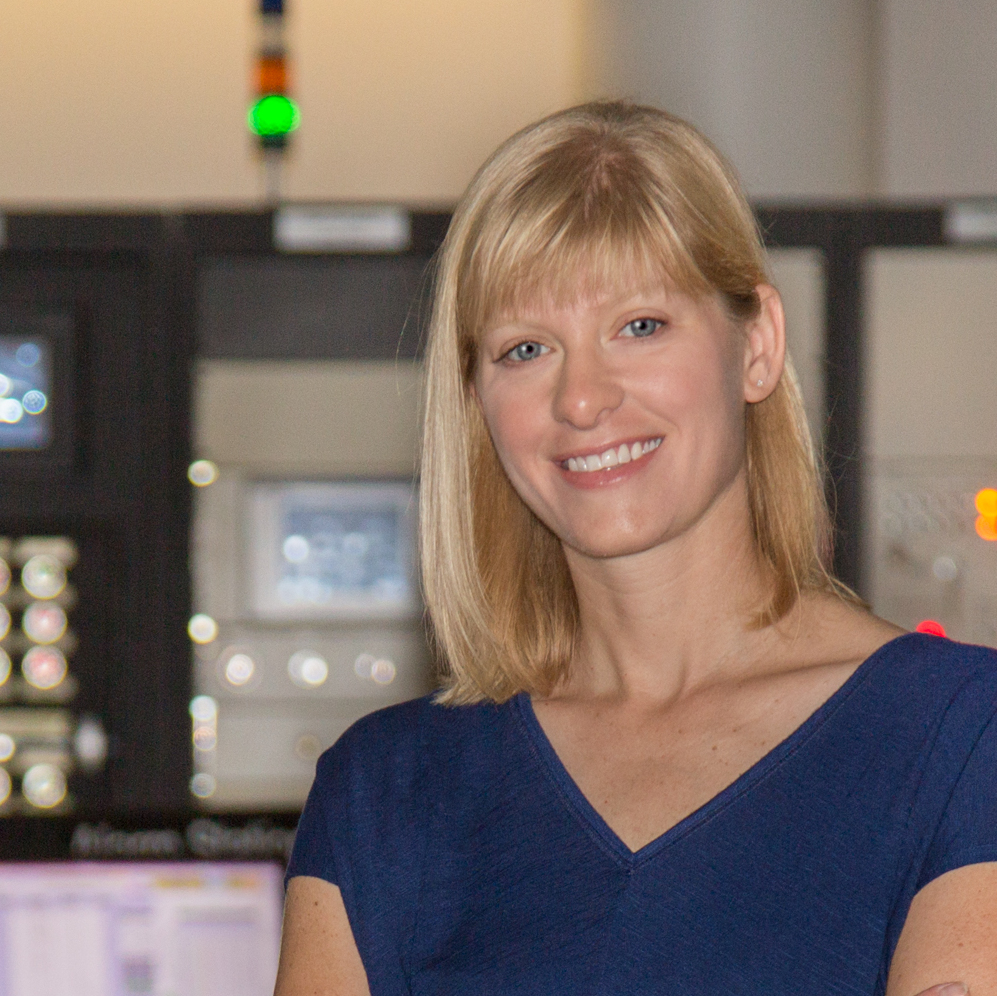
- in 2016

Academic background
- Education: B.S, Physics, 1998, University of North Dakota; MS, 2000, Ph.D., 2003, Indiana University Bloomington
- Thesis: Understanding space charge and controlling beam loss in high intensity synchrotrons (2003)

Academic work
- Institutions: University of Tennessee; Oak Ridge National Laboratory

Sarah Mariehelen Cousineau is an American physicist. In 2020, she was elected a Fellow of the American Physical Society for her "high-impact contributions to high-power proton accelerator research, inspiring workforce education and effective leadership in the physics of beams."

== Early life and education ==
Cousineau completed her Bachelor of Science degree from the University of North Dakota and her graduate degrees from Indiana University Bloomington. After earning her doctorate degree in accelerator physics from Indiana University, she joined Oak Ridge National Laboratory (ORNL) as a postdoctoral scientist.

== Career ==
While serving in a joint appointment with ORNL and the University of Tennessee, Cousineau served as the group leader in the Research Accelerator Division at the Spallation Neutron Source. In this role, she oversaw and coordinated beam physics research efforts for the SNS accelerator. In 2018, she led a group of researchers to create the first-ever 6D measurement of an accelerator beam. In 2020, Cousineau was elected a Fellow of the American Physical Society for her "high-impact contributions to high-power proton accelerator research, inspiring workforce education and effective leadership in the physics of beams."
