= Junhan Cho =

Chinese physicist

Junhan Cho is a Korean physicist, currently at Dankook University and an Elected Fellow of the American Physical Society.
