= Giuseppe Iannaccone =

Italian researcher

Giuseppe Iannaccone is an Italian scientist, engineer and author in the field of solid-state electronics and quantum transport. He is Professor of Electronics at the University of Pisa, Italy, Fellow of the Institute of Electrical and Electronics Engineers (IEEE), and Fellow of the American Physical Society (APS).

== Early life and education ==
Giuseppe Iannaccone was born in Avellino in 1968 and grew up in Livorno, graduating from scientific high school "Federigo Enriques" in 1986. He received his MS and PhD in Electrical Engineering from the University of Pisa in 1992 and 1996, respectively.

== Honours and awards ==
- Fellow of the Institute of Electrical and Electronics Engineers (IEEE) in 2015 for contributions to modeling transport and noise processes in nanoelectronic devices
- Fellow of the American Physical Society (APS) in 2015 for contributions to the theory of quantum transport and noise in mesoscopic and nanoelectronic devices and to their application in electronics.
- Maniponave first-in-class honor saber, Italian Naval Academy, 1993
