= Laura Henriques =

American science education scholar

Laura Henriques is an American science education scholar known for her work on common misconceptions about scientific concepts, especially among children, and her work with the Physics Teacher Education Coalition (PhysTEC). She is a professor in the Science Education Department at California State University, Long Beach.

== Education and career ==
Henriques graduated from Williams College in 1985 with a bachelor's degree in physics. From 1985 until 1992 she worked as a middle and high school physics teacher in New Jersey and Pennsylvania, and from 1990 to 1994 she was a master teacher for the Woodrow Wilson National Fellowship Foundation.

Returning to graduate study, she completed a Ph.D. in science education at the University of Iowa in 1997. Meanwhile, she joined CSU Long Beach in 1995.

== Recognition ==
Henriques was elected as a Fellow of the American Physical Society (APS) in 2020, after a nomination from the APS Forum on Education, "for many significant contributions to PhysTEC as a site lead, architect of a regional network, National Advisory Board member, and mentor for the new regional network as well as for service to the American Physical Society in various educational initiatives".

She was president of the California Association of Science Educators (CASE) from 2013 to 2015, and was the 2021 recipient of CASE's Margaret Nicholson Distinguished Service Award.

== Personal life ==
In 1995 she married Al Colburn, also a professor of science education at CSU Long Beach.
