= Dirk Smit =

American researcher and academic

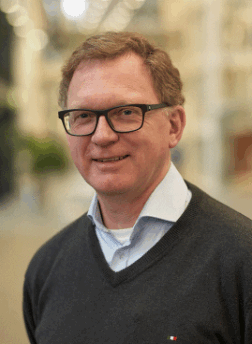

Dirk Smit is a Dutch researcher, academic, and entrepreneur associated with both the Massachusetts Institute of Technology (MIT) and Oxford University, where he focuses on energy systems and energy resources.

== Biography ==
Smit earned his Ph.D. in mathematical physics from Utrecht University in 1989, specializing in string theory. Following his doctoral studies, he undertook a postdoctoral fellowship at the University of California, Berkeley. He joined Shell in 1992, where he held various roles, including Chief Geophysicist for Shell UK and Technology Manager for Global Exploration.

He has served as a member of the Visiting Committee for the Department of Earth, Atmospheric, and Planetary Sciences (EAPS) at MIT since 2014. In 2018, Smit was named one of the inaugural Earth Resources Laboratory (ERL) Fellows at MIT. He holds a visiting professorship in Geoscience at the Chinese University of Petroleum in Beijing and is a member of multiple university advisory boards in the Netherlands, China, and the United States.

In 2019, he was appointed Shell’s Chief Science Officer. He retired from Shell in 2023.

== Honors ==
- 2002, Ludwig Mintrop Award in geophysics from the European Association of Geoscientists and Engineers
- Elected fellow of the Netherlands Academy of Engineering
- ERL Fellow at MIT (2018)
- Elected Fellow of the American Physical Society (2020).
