= Margaret Malloy =

Margaret Malloy is an American physicist and science editor. She is known for her long editorial career with the American Physical Society (APS), during which she served as the founding editor of Physical Review E and managing editor of Physical Review A.

In 2014, Malloy was named a Fellow of the American Physical Society. The citation recognized her editorial leadership and service to APS journals.
