= Michael Poirier =

Michael G. Poirier
- Born: Michael Guy Poirier
- Citizenship: United States
- Education: University of Illinois, Chicago; Truman State University
- Scientific career
- Fields: Biophysics
- Workplaces: Ohio State University
- Thesis: Micromechanical Biochemical Studies of Mitotic Chromosome Elasticity and Structure (2001)
- Doctoral advisor: John F. Marko
- Website: http://u.osu.edu/poirierlab/

Michael Guy Poirier is a professor and biophysicist at Ohio State University where he is a faculty member in both the Department of Physics and the Department of Chemistry and Biochemistry.

== Education ==
Poirier attended Truman State University where he earned a BS in physics in 1995. He earned a PhD in physics from the University of Illinois at Chicago in 2002. His PhD advisor was John F. Marko and his dissertation is entitled "Micromechanical Biochemical Studies of Mitotic Chromosome Elasticity and Structure" In 2006 he was hired as an assistant faculty member at Ohio State University. In 2012 he was promoted to associate faculty and in 2016 he became a full professor at Ohio State University.

== Publications ==
Poirier is author and co-author of publications in biophysics. His most cited paper is "Post-Translational Modifications of Histones That Influence Nucleosome Dynamics" which he co-authored with Gregory D. Bowman.

Another publication is "Basic helix-loop-helix pioneer factors interact with the histone octamer to invade nucleosomes and generate nucleosome-depleted regions".

== Awards and honors ==
In 2020, Poirier won the Lumley Interdisciplinary Research Award from the Ohio State University college of engineering.

In 2024, he was elected as a fellow of the American Physical Society.
