= Gabriel Spalding =

American physicist

Gabe Spalding
- Occupation: Physicist
- Employer: Illinois Wesleyan University
- Spouse: Brenda Wernick
- Children: 2
- Website: https://sun.iwu.edu/~gspaldin/Site/Overview.html

Gabriel C. Spalding is an American physicist.

Spalding studied physics and mathematics at Washington University in St. Louis, graduating in 1983. Seven years later, he completed a doctorate in applied physics at Harvard University. In 1996, Spalding joined the Illinois Wesleyan University faculty as a Professor of Physics. In 2014, Spalding received several honors. The SPIE and American Physical Society both elected him to fellow status. The APS additionally awarded Spalding the Jonathan F. Reichert and Barbara Wolff-Reichert Award for Excellence in Advanced Laboratory Instruction, and the American Association of Physics Teachers named him one of four recipients of its Homer L. Dodge Citations for Distinguished Service that year.
