= Katherine Prestridge =

American scientist

- Education: Princeton University
- Alma mater: University of California, San Diego
- Scientific career
- Institutions: Los Alamos National Laboratory
- Thesis: (1998)

Katherine P. Prestridge is an American scientist investigating fluids in extreme environments at Los Alamos National Laboratory.

== Biography ==
Prestridge completed her PhD in 1998 at University of California, San Diego, following a Bachelors of Science in aerospace engineering at Princeton University in 1992. She joined Los Alamos National Laboratory in 1998 and formed the Extreme Fluids Team in 2008.

Prestridge joined Editorial Advisory Board of the Experiments in Fluids journal in 2015. She was made a Fellow of the American Physical Society in 2019.

== Awards and honours ==
- 2019 – Fellow of the American Physical Society for "thoughtfully designed experiments on shock-driven mixing and turbulence, and for developing advanced flow diagnostics that bring insights to the understanding of mixing in extreme flows."

== Selected publications ==
- Tomkins, C.; Kumar, S.; Orlicz, G.; Prestridge, K. (25 September 2008). "An experimental investigation of mixing mechanisms in shock-accelerated flow". Journal of Fluid Mechanics. 611: 131–150. Bibcode:2008JFM...611..131T. doi:10.1017/S0022112008002723. S2CID 33609356.
- Balakumar, B. J.; Orlicz, G. C.; Tomkins, C. D.; Prestridge, K. P. (1 December 2008). "Simultaneous particle-image velocimetry–planar laser-induced fluorescence measurements of Richtmyer–Meshkov instability growth in a gas curtain with and without reshock". Physics of Fluids. 20 (12): 124103–124103–13. Bibcode:2008PhFl...20l4103B. doi:10.1063/1.3041705.
- Balakumar, B. J.; Orlicz, G. C.; Ristorcelli, J. R.; Balasubramanian, S.; Prestridge, K. P.; Tomkins, C. D. (10 April 2012). "Turbulent mixing in a Richtmyer–Meshkov fluid layer after reshock: velocity and density statistics". Journal of Fluid Mechanics. 696: 67–93. Bibcode:2012JFM...696...67B. doi:10.1017/jfm.2012.8. S2CID 53677542.
