= Huan Z. Huang =

Chinese physicist

Huan Zhong Huang (Chinese: 黄焕中) is a Chinese physicist.

Huang earned a bachelor's degree at Fudan University in 1984, followed by a doctorate at the Massachusetts Institute of Technology in 1990. He began teaching at the University of California, Los Angeles in 1995. In 2012, Huang was elected a fellow of the American Physical Society, "[f]or experimental measurements of strange hadrons, in particular hyperons, and quark number scaling in nucleus-nucleus collisions at RHIC".
