= Mette B. Gaarde =

Danish physicist

- Education: Copenhagen University (BS 1991, MS 1994, PhD 1997)
- Scientific career
- Fields: Atomic, Molecular, and Optical Physics
- Workplaces: Louisiana State University

Mette B. Gaarde is a Danish atomic, molecular, and optical physicist and Boyd Professor at Louisiana State University who conducts theoretical and computational research on ultrafast laser-matter interactions.

== Education and career ==
Gaarde completed her undergraduate degree and Ph.D. at the University of Copenhagen, Denmark, graduating with the latter in 1997. She was advised during her Ph.D. by 2023 Nobel laureate Anne L'Huillier. Prior to joining Louisiana State University, she worked as a research assistant professor at Lund University in Sweden.

In 2003, Gaarde joined the physics faculty at LSU. She is a Boyd professor and holds an endowed professorship as the Les and Dot Broussard Alumni Professor of Physics. Gaarde's research addresses both the quantum and classical effects that determine the ultrafast laser-matter interactions in atomic, molecular, and condensed-phase systems, and she studies a wide range of ultrafast dynamics. Throughout her career, she has collaborated widely with experimental groups.

Since 2025, Gaarde has served as co-Chair of the Committee on Atomic Molecular, and Optical Sciences (CAMOS), a standing committee under the National Academies of Science, Engineering, and Medicine. Garde also served as a member of the AMO2020 decadal study. From 2022 to 2023, Gaarde served as the Chair of the American Physical Society Division of Atomic, Molecular, and Optical Physics (DAMOP) where she oversaw the planning of the 2023 DAMOP meeting. Prior to this, Gaarde had served in several other positions within APS, including sitting on DAMOP committees and serving on the National Organizing Committee for the Conferences for Undergraduate Women in Physics (CUWiP).

== Honors and awards ==
Gaarde was elected a fellow of the American Physical Society in 2011. In 2015, she was additionally named a Fellow of the Optical Society America. In 2024, Gaarde was named an LSU Distinguished Research Master for her scholarship in physics. In 2025, she was named a Boyd professor.

== Selected publications ==
- L. Yue and M. B. Gaarde, Imperfect Recollisions in High-Harmonic Generation in Solids, Phys. Rev. Lett. 124, 153204 (2020).
- G. Ndabashimiye, S. Ghimire, M. Wu, D. A. Browne, K. J. Schafer, M. B. Gaarde, and D. A. Reis, Solid-state harmonics beyond the atomic limit, Nature 534, 520 (2016).
- L. Yue and M. B. Gaarde, Introduction to Theory of High-Harmonic Generation in Solids: Tutorial, J. Opt. Soc. Am. B 39, 535-555 (2022).
- M. Wu, S. Chen, S. Camp, K. J. Schafer, and M. B. Gaarde, Theory of strong-field attosecond transient absorption, Topical Review, J. Phys. B 49, 062003 (2016).
- A. P. Fidler, S. J. Camp, E. R. Warrick, E. Bloch, H. J. B. Marroux, D. M. Neumark, K. J. Schafer, M. B. Gaarde, and S. R. Leone, Nonlinear XUV Signal Generation Probed by Attosecond Transient Grating Spectroscopy, Nature Communications 10, 1384 (2019).
- S. Bengtsson, E. W. Larsen, D. Kroon, S. Camp, M. Miranda, C. L. Arnold, A. L’Huillier, K. J. Schafer, M. B. Gaarde, L. Rippe, and J. Mauritsson, Controlled free-induction decay in the extreme ultraviolet, Nature Photonics 11, 252 (2017).
- K. Li, M. Labeye, P. J. Ho, M. B. Gaarde, and L. Young, Resonant propagation of x-rays from the linear to the nonlinear regime, Phys. Rev. A 102, 053113 (2020).
- A. S. Folorunso, A. Bruner, F. Mauger, K. A. Hamer, S. Hernandez, R. R. Jones, L. F. DiMauro, M. B. Gaarde, K. Lopata, and K. J. Schafer, Molecular modes of attosecond charge migration, Phys. Rev. Lett. 126, 133002 (2021).
- F. Mauger, A. S. Folorunso, K. A. Hamer, C. Chandre, M. B. Gaarde, K. Lopata, and K. J. Schafer, Charge migration and attosecond solitons in conjugated organic molecules, Phys. Rev. Res. 4, 013073 (2022).
- K. Hamer, F. Mauger, A. Folorunso, K. Lopata, R. R. Jones, L. F. DiMauro, K. J. Schafer, and M. B. Gaarde, Characterizing Particle-Like Charge Migration Dynamics with High-Harmonic Sideband Spectroscopy, Phys. Rev. A 106, 013103 (2022).
- T. T. Gorman, T. D. Scarborough, P. M. Abanador, F. Mauger, D. Kiesewetter, P. Sandor, S. Khatri, K. Lopata, K. J. Schafer, P. Agostini, M. B. Gaarde, and L. F. DiMauro, Probing the Interplay between Geometric and Electronic-Structure Features via High-Harmonic Spectroscopy, J. Chem. Phys. 150, 184308 (2019).
- P. Sandor, A. Sissay, F. Mauger, M. Gordon, T. Gorman, T. Scarborough, M. B. Gaarde, K. Lopata, K. J. Schafer, and R. R. Jones, Angle-dependent Strong-Field Ionization of Halomethanes, J. Chem. Phys. 151, 194308 (2019).
- J. M. Brown, A. Couairon, P. Polynkin, and M. B. Gaarde, Analysis of the angular spectrum for ultrashort laser pulses, JOSA B 36, A105 (2019).
- R. Piccoli, J. Brown, Y.-G. Jeong, A. Rovere, L. Zanotto, M. B. Gaarde, F. Légaré, A. Couairon, J. C. Travers, R. Morandotti, B. E. Schmidt, and L. Razzari, Intense few-cycle visible pulses directly generated via nonlinear fibre mode mixing, Nature Photonics 15, 884 (2021).
- M. B. Gaarde, J. L. Tate, and K. J. Schafer, Macroscopic aspects of attosecond pulse generation, Topical Review, J. Phys. B 41, 132001 (2008).\.
