= Hai-Hu Wen =

Chinese physicist

Hai-Hu Wen is a Chinese physicist.

Wen studied physics at Anhui University, and obtained postgraduate degrees at the Institute of Physics, Chinese Academy of Sciences. After completing postdoctoral study at Vrije Universiteit Amsterdam, Wen returned to IOPCAS, and accepted a professorship at Nanjing University. In 2013, he was elected a fellow of the American Physical Society, "[f]or investigations of unconventional pairing mechanisms in high temperature superconductors and elucidation of their vortex dynamics."
