= Steven W. Yates =

American physicist

Steven W. Yates is an American nuclear chemist who is currently a distinguished professor at the University of Kentucky and an elected fellow of the International Union of Pure and Applied Chemistry (IUPAC), American Chemical Society (ACS), and American Physical Society (APS).
