= Shan X. Wang =

Materials scientist

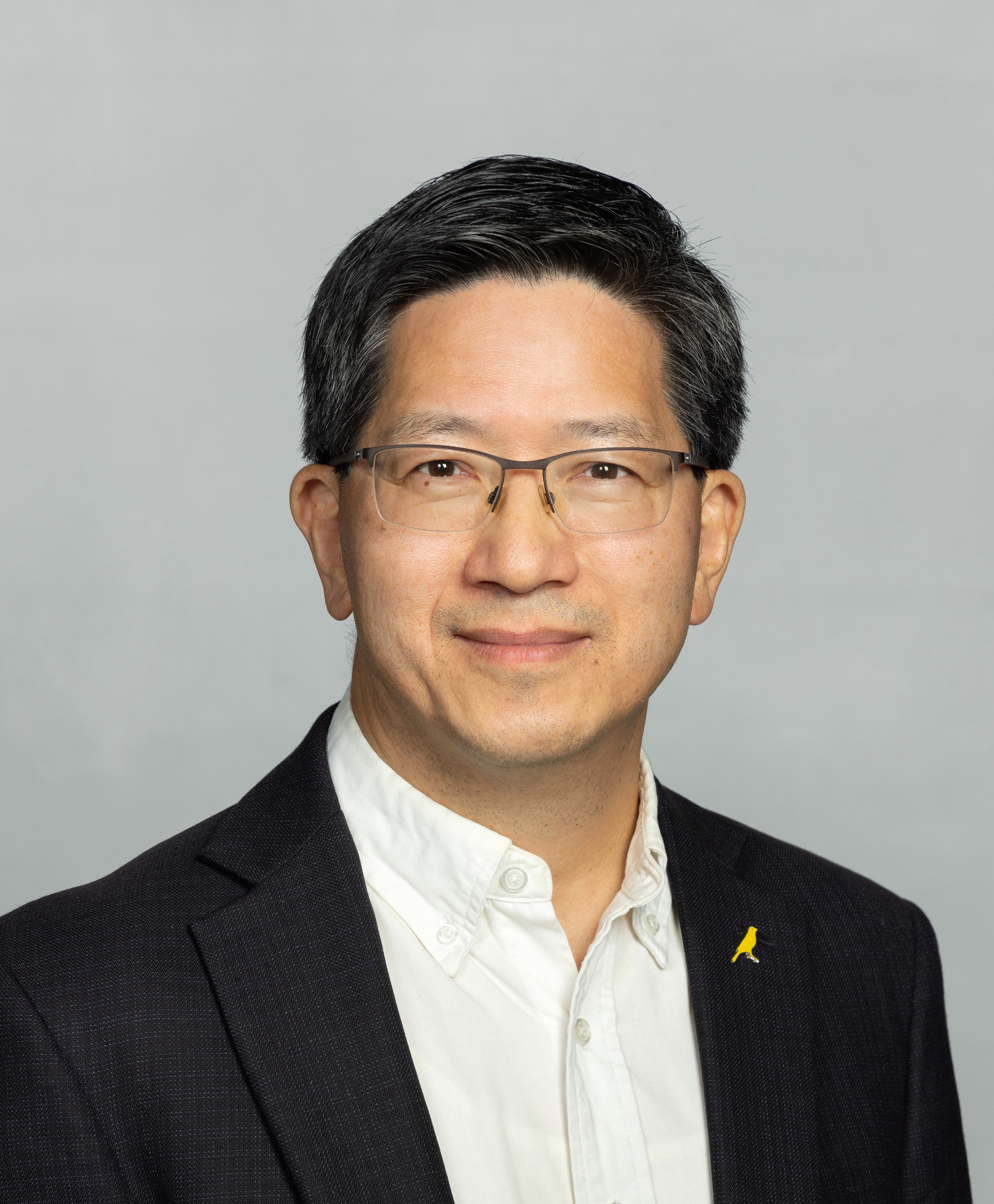
- Shan X. Wang
- Education: University of Science and Technology of China (B.S., 1986); Iowa State University (M.S., 1988); Carnegie Mellon University (Ph.D., 1993)
- Known for: GMR biosensors; Magnetic nanoparticles; Cancer biomarkers & diagnostics; Energy-efficient AI & Compute; Magnetic information storage
- Awards: IEEE Magnetics Society Achievement Award (2025); Fellow, National Academy of Inventors (2021); Fellow, American Physical Society (2012); Fellow, IEEE (2009)
- Scientific career
- Fields: Materials science; Electrical engineering; Biomedical diagnostics & imaging
- Workplaces: Stanford University
- Website: wanggroup.stanford.edu

Shan X. Wang is a materials scientist and electrical engineer at Stanford University, known for magnetic nanotechnology including GMR biosensors and spintronic devices. He is the Leland T. Edwards Professor in the School of Engineering and, by courtesy, Professor of Radiology in the School of Medicine.

== Academic career ==
Wang joined Stanford University as an assistant professor of materials science and engineering with a joint appointment in electrical engineering in 1993, became associate professor in 2001, and full professor in 2006. He has served as associate chair of the Materials Science & Engineering Department (2014–2019). He directs the Stanford Center for Magnetic Nanotechnology (formerly CRISM)..Wang has also held visiting and adjunct roles, including Distinguished Adjunct Professor of Electrical Engineering at Tsinghua University (2022–2023) and Professor in Residence at StartX (2017).

== Research ==
Wang's laboratory has developed giant magnetoresistive (GMR) biosensor chips for multiplex protein detection and other assays, with peer-reviewed demonstrations in real-time magnetic nanotag sensing and matrix-insensitive measurements. Clinical applications include a circulating-tumor-DNA assay for EGFR mutations with an analytical sensitivity of 0.01%.

He co-developed a microfabricated magnetic sifter for rare-cell and nanoparticle separation, and a magnetic-hydrogel approach (MagSToNE) to aid retrieval of kidney-stone fragments during ureteroscopy.

Beyond biomedicine, the group has published in spintronics and magnetic memory, including field-free spin-orbit-torque and an STT-assisted SOT-MRAM (SAS-MRAM) architecture reported across device and CAD venues.

In 2025, Wang's team won first place in the 3rd Clarity Prediction Challenge (CPC3) with the entry Intrusive Intelligibility Prediction with ASR Encoders, which used a reference-aware architecture based on speech foundation model encoders.

== Entrepreneurship and technology translation ==
Wang has co-founded several companies to commercialize magnetic biosensing, including MagIC Lifescience and MagArray, Inc.. MagArray launched a blood test for lung-nodule risk assessment in 2018.. Wang has co-founded Curve Biosciences, which develops DNA-methylation–based next-generation sequencing (NGS) assays for the early detection and management of liver disease, including liver cancer. In October 2025, Curve Biosciences announced that it had raised US$40 million to support chronic disease monitoring.
