= Maria Iavarone =

Italian-American physicist

Maria Iavarone is an Italian and American condensed matter physicist who uses scanning tunneling spectroscopy and scanning probe microscopy to investigate the quantum properties of nanomaterials and superconductors. She is a professor of physics and chair of the Department of Physics at Temple University.

== Education and career ==
After receiving her Ph.D. in 1996 from the University of Naples Federico II, Iavarone worked as a research scientist at the Argonne National Laboratory from 2001 to 2009. She moved to Temple University in 2010, as an associate professor. She became department chair in 2024.

== Recognition ==
She was elected as a Fellow of the American Physical Society (APS) in 2021, after a nomination from the APS Division of Condensed Matter Physics, "for outstanding and pioneering studies of spatially resolved electronic structure in broken symmetry states".
