= Jian-Xin Zhu =

American physicist

Jian-Xin Zhu (朱建新) is an American physicist currently at Los Alamos National Laboratory and an Elected Fellow of the American Physical Society.
