= Giorgio Apollinari =

American physicist

- Scientific career
- Fields: Physicist

Giorgio Apollinari is an American physicist, currently at Fermi National Accelerator Laboratory and an Elected Fellow of the American Physical Society.
