= Adrienn Ruzsinszky =

Chemical physicist

- Education: Budapest University of Technology and Economics (Ph.D.)
- Awards: Elected to American Physical Society
- Scientific career
- Fields: density functional theory, computational materials science
- Workplaces: Tulane University, Temple University

Adrienn Ruzsinszky is an expert in computational density functional theory in chemical physics, and its application in computational materials science predicting the bulk properties of solids. Educated in Hungary, she works in the US as a professor of physics at Tulane University.

== Education and career ==
Ruzsinszky earned a Ph.D. in 2004 from the Budapest University of Technology and Economics. After postdoctoral research at Tulane University, and becoming a research assistant professor at Tulane in 2011, she moved to Temple University in 2013. She earned tenure there as an associate professor, before returning to her present position as a professor at Tulane.

== Recognition ==
In 2023, Ruzsinszky was named as a Fellow of the American Physical Society (APS), after a nomination from the APS Division of Computational Physics, "for the development of electronic structure theory methods, especially density functional theory and the random phase approximation, and their application to materials and molecules, including two-dimensional materials under bending".
