= Ching-Long Lin =

Taiwanese mechanical engineer

Ching-Long Lin is a Taiwanese mechanical engineer.

Lin earned a Bachelor of Science degree from National Taiwan University in 1986. He then completed a master's degree at Stanford University in 1989, followed by a doctorate in 1994. Lin joined the University of Iowa faculty in 1997, where he later held the Edward M. Mielnik & Samuel R. Harding Professorship of Mechanical Engineering. Lin was elected a fellow of the American Physical Society in 2014, "[f]or his contribution to multiscale flow physics and computational techniques, including pulmonary tracheobronchial and acinar flows, image-based data-driven human lung models, lattice-Boltzmann methods, coherent structures in atmospheric boundary layer and four dimensional data assimilation."
