= Lorin Swint Matthews =

American astrophysicist

Lorin Swint Matthews is an American astrophysicist whose research concerns dusty plasma, its role in planet formation, the structures formed within it in computational simulation and laboratory experiments, and the design of shielding to protect spacecraft from it. She is a professor of physics and chair of the Department of Physics at Baylor University.

== Education and career ==
Matthews is originally from Paris, Texas, one of six children of biochemist Susan Brown Swint and her husband, dermatologist Richard B. Swint. She was a student of physics at Baylor University, earning a bachelor's degree there in 1994 and completing her Ph.D. in 1998.

After two years as an engineer in the aerospace industry, she returned to Baylor as a lecturer. She became a regular-rank assistant professor in physics in 2006, and a full professor in 2017. She was named department chair in 2021.

== Recognition ==
Matthews was named a Fellow of the American Physical Society (APS) in 2023, after a nomination from the APS Division of Plasma Physics, "for pioneering contributions to the fundamental understanding of dust charging and dynamics in a plasma environment through numerical studies".
