= Matthieu Verstraete =

American physicist

- Education: Ecole Polytechnique Fédérale de Lausanne Université catholique de Louvain
- Scientific career
- Fields: Computational Physics, Nanomaterials
- Workplaces: University of Liège
- Thesis: Ab initio calculation of the structural, electronic, and superconducting properties of nanotubes and nanowires (2005)
- Doctoral advisor: Xavier Gonze Jean-Christophe Charlier

Matthieu Verstraete is an American physicist, currently (December 2022) at University of Liège and an Elected Fellow of the American Physical Society. He has been the chair of the steering committee of the European Theoretical Spectroscopy Facility and a member of the international advisory committee of ABINIT (The opensource DFT software).
