= James Caruthers =

American chemical engineer

James M. Caruthers is an American chemical engineer, currently Gerald and Sarah Skidmore Professor of Chemical Engineering at Purdue University and an Elected Fellow of the American Physical Society. Caruthers got his S.B., S.M., and Ph.D. (all in chemistry) from Massachusetts Institute of Technology in 1975, 1976 and 1977, respectively.
