= Kai Sun =

Electrical engineering professor

Kai Sun is a professor in the Department of Electrical Engineering and Computer Science at the University of Tennessee, Knoxville, whose research focuses on power-system dynamics, stability, simulation, and control. He became an IEEE Fellow in 2024 for contributions to power-grid stability analysis and control.

== Education and career ==
Sun received his bachelor's degree in automation in 1999 and his doctoral degree in control science and engineering in 2004 from Tsinghua University. His doctoral dissertation, on ordered binary decision diagram (OBDD)-based controlled separation of large power grids, was selected for China's National Excellent Doctoral Dissertation Award in 2006.

After completing his doctorate, Sun held postdoctoral research positions at the University of Western Ontario and Arizona State University. He subsequently worked at the Electric Power Research Institute (EPRI) from 2007 to 2012 before joining the University of Tennessee in 2012.

== Research ==
Sun's research has focused on power-system dynamics, stability, simulation, and control. His early work included OBDD-based methods for controlled system separation and the use of synchrophasor measurements and decision trees for online power-system security assessment.

He later worked on cascading-failure analysis, including data-driven interaction models for representing relationships among component outages and their propagation during cascading events. An independent survey later classified this work among outage-sequence-based interaction-graph approaches to cascading-failure analysis.

His more recent research has included semi-analytical methods for power-system simulation, including approaches based on power-series approximation and differential transformation. He edited the Wiley–IEEE Press volume Power System Simulation Using Semi-Analytical Methods in 2023.

== Awards and recognition ==
In 2016, he received a National Science Foundation CAREER Award for the project Integrated Research and Education in Nonlinear Modal Decoupling and Control for Resilient Interconnected Power Systems.

A paper he co-authored on nonlinear electromechanical oscillations was selected as one of the IEEE Transactions on Power Systems Outstanding Papers for 2023.

In 2024, Sun was elevated to IEEE Fellow for contributions to power-grid stability analysis and control.

== Selected books ==
- Sun, Kai; Hou, Yunhe; Sun, Wei; Qi, Junjian (2018). Power System Control Under Cascading Failures: Understanding, Mitigation, and System Restoration. Wiley–IEEE Press. ISBN 9781119282075.
- Sun, Kai, ed. (2023). Power System Simulation Using Semi-Analytical Methods. Wiley–IEEE Press. ISBN 9781119988045.
- Sun, Kai, ed. (2024). Cascading Failures in Power Grids: Risk Assessment, Modeling, and Simulation. Springer. doi:10.1007/978-3-031-48000-3. ISBN 978-3-031-47999-1.
