= Yoshitaka Hatta =

Japanese-American physicist

- Born: Japan
- Education: Kyoto University
- Occupation: Physicist

Yoshitaka Hatta is a Japanese-American physicist. He worked as a distinguished scientist at the United States Department of Energy's Brookhaven National Laboratory since 2018. He previously served as an associate professor at the University of Tsukuba from 2008 to 2013, and at the Yukawa Institute for Theoretical Physics at Kyoto University from 2013 to 2018.

== Life and career ==
Hatta was born in Japan. He attended Kyoto University, earning his BS degree in 1999, his MS degree in 2001 and his PhD degree in physics in 2004. After earning his degrees, he worked as a postdoctoral fellow at the RIKEN BNL Research Center from 2004 to 2006, and in Saclay from 2006 to 2008.

Hatta served as an associate professor at the University of Tsukuba from 2008 to 2013, and at the Yukawa Institute for Theoretical Physics at Kyoto University from 2013 to 2018. Since 2018, he worked as a distinguished scientist at the United States Department of Energy's Brookhaven National Laboratory. During his years as a distinguished scientist, in 2025, he was named a fellow of the American Physical Society, "for important contributions to strong-interaction physics, including the spin and gravitational structure of the nucleon, small-X tomography of nucleons and nuclei, and the phases of QCD".
