= Jay Fineberg =

Israeli physicist (born 1956)

- ג'יי פינברג
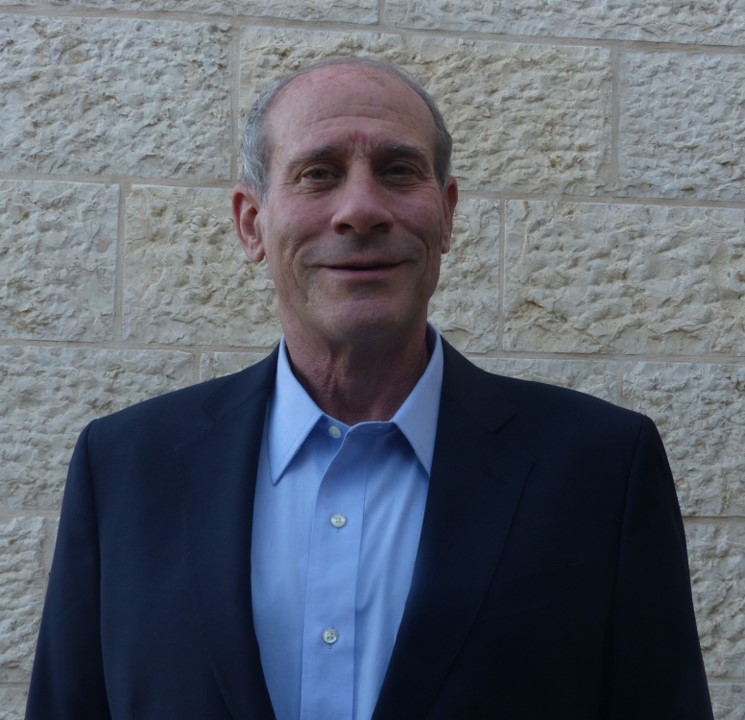
- Jay Fineberg
- Born: 1956 (age 69–70)
- Known for: Nonlinear fracture Dynamic friction Laboratory earthquakes
- Scientific career
- Fields: Physics
- Institutions: The Racah Institute of Physics; Hebrew University of Jerusalem
- Website: http://old.phys.huji.ac.il/~jay/

Jay Fineberg (Hebrew: ג'יי פינברג; born 1956) is an Israeli physicist. He is a professor at The Racah Institute of Physics of the Hebrew University of Jerusalem. He is known for his work on various aspects of nonlinear physics, mainly in the fields of fracture ('how things break') and friction ('how things slide'). He is an elected fellow of the American Physical Society and the Israel Physical Society.

== Education and career ==
Fineberg studied mathematics and physics at the Hebrew University of Jerusalem, graduating with Bachelor's degrees in both subjects in 1981. He later went on to earn his M.S. (1983) and Ph.D. (1988) in physics at the Weizmann Institute of Science. He then moved to the center for nonlinear dynamics at the University of Texas at Austin as a postdoc, where he started his career in the non-linear physics about fracture and friction.

Fineberg joined the Racah Institute of Physics of the Hebrew University of Jerusalem in 1992 and was appointed as a full professor in 2001. Fineberg served as the head of the Racah Institute of Physics (2005-2009), and as the Vice-Dean (2009-2011) and Dean (2016-2020) of the Faculty of Mathematics and Sciences.

== Research ==
Fineberg's research interests have been mainly focused on the physics of fracture and friction. His early work includes the study of experimental nonlinear dynamics and nonlinear pattern-forming systems. He discovered the localized micro-branching instabilities during the fast crack propagation and validated the nonlinear propagating solitary wave in the high-speed fracture process. Other interests include dynamics of crack propagation, crack tip singularity and crack fragmentation.

Fineberg developed systematic experimental methods to study shear cracks, including real-time and high spatial observation of interfacial friction and laboratory earthquakes. He validated the linear elastic fracture mechanics at the early stage of friction. He recently investigated the microscopic friction nucleation and dynamics in both homogeneous and heterogeneous interfaces.

== Awards and honors ==
In 2011 Fineberg was elected a fellow of the American Physical Society, cited for "his clever experiments and analyses of the dynamics of nonequilibrium systems, particularly concerning the propagation and instabilities of cracks in solids and gels, the dynamics of friction and earthquakes, and instabilities in oscillated liquid layers." In 2021 he was elected a fellow of the Israel Physical Society for "his original and incisive contributions to the dynamics and instabilities of fractures, and the onset of dynamical friction."

== Selected publications ==
- Fineberg, Jay; Gross, Steven P.; Marder, M.; Swinney, Harry L. (1991). "Instability in dynamic fracture". Physical Review Letters. 67 (4): 457–460. Bibcode:1991PhRvL..67..457F. doi:10.1103/PhysRevLett.67.457. ISSN 0031-9007. PMID 10044899.
- Sharon, Eran; Fineberg, Jay (January 1999). "Confirming the continuum theory of dynamic brittle fracture for fast cracks". Nature. 397 (6717): 333–335. Bibcode:1999Natur.397..333S. doi:10.1038/16891. ISSN 0028-0836. S2CID 4430985.
- Sagy, Amir; Reches, Ze'ev; Fineberg, Jay (July 2002). "Dynamic fracture by large extraterrestrial impacts as the origin of shatter cones". Nature. 418 (6895): 310–313. Bibcode:2002Natur.418..310S. doi:10.1038/nature00903. ISSN 0028-0836. PMID 12124620. S2CID 4396039.
- Rubinstein, Shmuel M.; Cohen, Gil; Fineberg, Jay (August 2004). "Detachment fronts and the onset of dynamic friction". Nature. 430 (7003): 1005–1009. Bibcode:2004Natur.430.1005R. doi:10.1038/nature02830. ISSN 0028-0836. PMID 15329715. S2CID 4350304.
- Ben-David, Oded; Rubinstein, Shmuel M.; Fineberg, Jay (January 2010). "Slip-stick and the evolution of frictional strength". Nature. 463 (7277): 76–79. Bibcode:2010Natur.463...76B. doi:10.1038/nature08676. ISSN 0028-0836. PMID 20054393. S2CID 4309635.
- Bouchbinder, Eran; Fineberg, Jay; Marder, M. (2010). "Dynamics of Simple Cracks". Annual Review of Condensed Matter Physics. 1 (1): 371–395. arXiv:0911.0173. Bibcode:2010ARCMP...1..371B. doi:10.1146/annurev-conmatphys-070909-104019. ISSN 1947-5454. S2CID 56404045.
- Kolvin, Itamar; Cohen, Gil; Fineberg, Jay (2018). "Topological defects govern crack front motion and facet formation on broken surfaces". Nature Materials. 17 (2): 140–144. arXiv:1708.01881. doi:10.1038/nmat5008. ISSN 1476-1122. PMID 29035358.
