= Britton Plourde =

American quantum physicist

Britton L. T. Plourde is a professor of physics at the University of Wisconsin–Madison (UW) and a quantum hardware engineer at Qolab. He began his tenure at UW in 2024, having previously served as a professor at Syracuse University from 2005 to 2024. He was named a Fellow of the Institute of Electrical and Electronics Engineers (IEEE) in 2023 for his contributions to integration of qubits into future practical quantum computing systems.

Plourde received NSF CAREER Award in 2006 and served as the Editor-in-Chief for IEEE Transactions on Applied Superconductivity from 2013 until 2019. He earned his PhD in physics from the University of Illinois Urbana-Champaign in 2000. He was a postdoctoral fellow at University of California, Berkeley.
