= Jennifer Hollingsworth =

American inorganic chemist

- Education: Washington University in St. Louis; Grinnell College
- Scientific career
- Workplaces: Los Alamos National Laboratory
- Thesis: Chemical routes to nanocrystalline and thin-film III-VI and I-III-VI semiconductors (1999)
- Doctoral advisor: William E Buhro
- Website: CINT Wepbage

Jennifer Ann Hollingsworth is a scientist and laboratory fellow at Los Alamos National Laboratory (LANL).

== Education ==
Hollingsworth received a B.A. in chemistry from Grinnell College in 1992 and a Ph.D. in inorganic chemistry from Washington University in St. Louis in 1999.

== Career and research ==
Hollingsworth is known for her contributions to the field of semiconductor core/shell quantum dots (QDs). Hollingsworth’s breakthrough discovery of “giant” QDs eliminated for the first time the problematic photophysical phenomenon of “blinking” (interruptions in light emission that represent a significant drawback for standard QDs). Her work is exemplary of multidisciplinary materials research, spanning materials chemistry and physics and involving the design and elucidation of nanocrystals intentionally engineered for new functionality and the development of novel synthetic methods for their preparation. She was awarded an APS Fellowship in 2018 for discovering and developing non-blinking 'giant' QDs.

== Awards and recognition ==
- Fellow of the American Association for the Advancement of Science (2019)
- APS Fellowship (2018)
- LANL Program Recognition Award and LANL Achievement Award (2014)
- LANL Fellows' Prize for Research (2013)
- LANL Associate Directorate for Chemistry, Life, & Earth Sciences Achievement Award (2009)
- LANL Awards for Outstanding Scientific Achievement (2010, 2006, 2001)
- LANL Women's Career Development Mentoring Award (2005)
- LANL Distinguished Postdoctoral Performance Award, Small Team (2002)
- LANL Distinguished Mentor Performance Award (2023)
