= Dominik Zumbühl =

Swiss physicist

Dominik Zumbühl is a Swiss experimental physicist known for his contributions to quantum coherence, spin physics, and semiconductor quantum dots as well as to low temperature quantum transport experiments.

He obtained a physics diploma from ETH Zurich in 1998 and a Master of Science degree from Stanford University in 2000. He received his PhD from Harvard University in 2004, focusing on quantum coherence and spin in semiconductor quantum dots. Following his doctoral studies, Zumbühl completed a two-year postdoctoral fellowship at the Massachusetts Institute of Technology (MIT) before establishing his own research group at the University of Basel in 2006, where he set up a low temperature quantum transport laboratory and research group.

Zumbühl was awarded a starting grant in the first European Research Council (ERC) call in 2008. He was promoted to associate professor in 2012 and then to full professor in 2023 at the University of Basel. Zumbühl served as the Department Chair from 2015 to 2019 and has been the director of the NCCR SPIN (Swiss National Program on Quantum Computing with Si and Ge spins) since 2021.

In 2023, Zumbühl was elected as a fellow of the American Physical Society (APS) "for quantum transport experiments in semiconductor nanostructures at low temperatures studying coherence, spins, and spin-orbit coupling including developing and deploying laboratory instruments".

Dominik Zumbühl co-founded Basel Precision Instruments GmbH (BASPI) in 2018, a company that develops laboratory electronics and cryogenic equipment. The company produces various instruments used in quantum research and other scientific fields.

== Selected publications ==
Geyer, S., Hetényi, B., Bosco, S., Camenzind, L. C., Eggli, R. S., Fuhrer, A., Loss, D., Warburton, R. J., Zumbühl, D. M., & Kuhlmann, A. V. (2024). Anisotropic exchange interaction of two hole-spin qubits. Nature Physics. https://doi.org/10.1038/s41567-024-02481-5

Eggli, R. S., Svab, S., Patlatiuk, T., Trüssel, D. A., Carballido, M. J., Chevalier Kwon, P., Geyer, S., Li, A., Bakkers, E. P. A. M., & Kuhlmann, A. V. (2023). Cryogenic hyperabrupt strontium titanate varactors for sensitive reflectometry of quantum dots. Physical Review Applied, 20(5), 054056. https://doi.org/10.1103/PhysRevApplied.20.054056

Bosco, S., Geyer, S., Camenzind, L. C., Eggli, R. S., Fuhrer, A., Warburton, R. J., Zumbühl, D. M., Egues, J. C., Kuhlmann, A. V., & Loss, D. (2023). Phase-driving hole spin qubits. Physical Review Letters, 131(19), 197001. https://doi.org/10.1103/PhysRevLett.131.197001

Ferguson, M. S., Camenzind, L. C., Müller, C., Biesinger, D. E. F., Scheller, C. P., Braunecker, B., Zumbühl, D. M., & Zilberberg, O. (2023). Measurement-induced population switching. Physical Review Research, 5(2), 023028. https://doi.org/10.1103/PhysRevResearch.5.023028

Samani, M., Scheller, C. P., Sedeh, O. S., Zumbühl, D. M., Yurttağül, N., Grigoras, K., Gunnarsson, D., Prunnila, M., Jones, A. T., Prance, J. R., & Haley, R. P. (2022). Microkelvin electronics on a pulse-tube cryostat with a gate Coulomb-blockade thermometer. Physical Review Research, 4(3), 033225. https://doi.org/10.1103/PhysRevResearch.4.033225

Camenzind, L. C., Geyer, S., Fuhrer, A., Warburton, R. J., Zumbühl, D. M., & Kuhlmann, A. V. (2022). A hole spin qubit in a fin field-effect transistor above 4 kelvin. Nature Electronics, 5(3), 178-183. https://doi.org/10.1038/s41928-022-00722-0

Haley, R., Prance, J., & Zumbühl, D. (2021). Breaking the millikelvin barrier in nanoelectronics. Europhysics News, 52(4), 26-29. https://doi.org/10.1051/epn/2021406

Camenzind, L. C., Svab, S., Stano, P., Yu, L., Zimmerman, J. D., Gossard, A. C., Loss, D., & Zumbühl, D. M. (2021). Isotropic and anisotropic g-factor corrections in GaAs quantum dots. Physical Review Letters, 127(5), 057701. https://doi.org/10.1103/PhysRevLett.127.057701

Froning, F. N. M., Camenzind, L. C., van der Molen, O. A. H., Li, A., Bakkers, E. P. A. M., Zumbühl, D. M., & Braakman, F. R. (2021). Ultrafast hole spin qubit with gate-tunable spin–orbit switch functionality. Nature Nanotechnology, 16(3), 308-312. https://doi.org/10.1038/s41565-020-00828-6
