= Andrei Gritsan =

American-Siberian particle physicist

- Born: Russia

Academic background
- Education: BS, 1994, MS, 1996, physics, Novosibirsk State University; PhD, 2000, University of Colorado Boulder
- Thesis: Rare B meson decays with [eta prime] or [eta] mesons (2000)

Academic work
- Institutions: Johns Hopkins University; Lawrence Berkeley National Laboratory
- Website: gritsan.pha.jhu.edu

Andrei Valeryevich Gritsan is an American-Siberian particle physicist. He was a member of a team of researchers at the Large Hadron Collider, who, in 2012, announced the discovery of a new subatomic particle, a Higgs boson.

== Early life and education ==
Gritsan was born in Russia and graduated from Novosibirsk State University with his Bachelor of Science degree and master's degree in physics. He then enrolled at the University of Colorado, Boulder in the United States for his PhD.

== Career ==
Gritsan joined the faculty at Johns Hopkins University in 2005 after working at the Lawrence Berkeley National Laboratory. As an assistant professor in the department of physics and astronomy, Gritsan won both the National Science Foundation's Faculty Early Career Development Award and a Sloan Research Fellowship in 2007. A few years later, he worked alongside more than 2,000 other scientists and researchers on the Higgs boson which was the recipient of a Nobel Prize in Physics.

In recognition of his "significant contributions to the discovery and to the characterization of the Higgs Boson at the CERN Large Hadron Collider, and for significant contributions to the measurement of sin2alpha at the SLAC PEP II collider," Gritsan was elected a Fellow of the American Physical Society.
