= Bei Zeng =

Quantum information theorist

Bei Zeng (Chinese: 曾蓓) is a quantum information theorist and professor of physics at The University of Texas at Dallas. As well as quantum information, her research interests include quantum computing and quantum error correction.

== Education and career ==
At the age of 12, Zeng was the best chess player in her province in China. Her career was influenced by her family's roots in the game. At the age of 17, after watching a supercomputer beat a world champion chess player, this sparked a desire to change her career.

Zeng is a 2002 graduate of Tsinghua University, where she studied physics and mathematics. After earning a master's degree at Tsinghua University in 2004, Zeng joined IBM as an intern in 2008, offering her a rare opportunity to challenge the computer that made her want to change careers. She completed a Ph.D. in physics at the Massachusetts Institute of Technology in 2009. Her dissertation, Quantum operations and codes beyond the Stabilizer-Clifford framework, was supervised by Isaac Chuang.

She became a postdoctoral researcher at the University of Waterloo, affiliated both with the Institute for Quantum Computing and the Department of Combinatorics & Optimization, before becoming an assistant professor at the University of Guelph in 2010, rising through the academic ranks there to become full professor in 2018. In 2019, she joined the Hong Kong University of Science and Technology and became the director of the IAS Center for Quantum Technologies. She moved to her present position at The University of Texas at Dallas in 2024. She continues to maintain an adjunct faculty affiliation with the University of Waterloo Department of Physics and Astronomy.

== Book ==
Zeng is a coauthor of the book Quantum Information Meets Quantum Matter: From Quantum Entanglement to Topological Phases of Many-Body Systems (with Xie Chen, Duan-Lu Zhou, and Xiao-Gang Wen, Springer, 2019).

== Recognition ==
In 2021, Zeng was named a Fellow of the American Physical Society (APS), after a nomination from the APS Division of Quantum Information, "for pioneering work and contributions in quantum information science (QIS), including error correction and fault-tolerance, many-body entanglement, quantum tomography, quantum marginals, and QIS applications in quantum matter, and for her long-term contribution to QIS services and education".
