= William D. Ristenpart =

American chemical engineer

- Education: University of California, Davis; Princeton University
- Occupation: Chemical engineer

William D. Ristenpart is an American chemical engineer. He was the Joe and Essie Smith Endowed Professor of Chemical Engineering at the University of California, Davis from 2012 to 2019.

In 2024, Ristenpart was named a fellow of the American Physical Society, "for impactful experimental and theoretical studies in fluid mechanics and transport processes, including coalescence, AC electrokinetics, and aerosol transport that are relevant to diseases, as well as new insights into transport phenomena that are relevant to making coffee".
