= Genda Gu =

Condensed matter physicist

Genda Gu is a condensed matter physicist at the Brookhaven National Laboratory. In his research, Gu specializes in the synthesis of large, high quality crystals for the production of superconductors. He works in the Brookhaven Laboratory's crystal growth lab, and as an adjunct professor at Stony Brook University. In 2012, Gu became a fellow of the American Physical Society.

Gu obtained his PhD from the Harbin Institute of Technology.
