= Thomas Mehlhorn =

Thomas Mehlhorn is an engineer at the Naval Research Laboratory in Washington, DC. He was named a Fellow of the Institute of Electrical and Electronics Engineers (IEEE) in 2014 for his work in understanding intense pulsed electron and ion beams.
