= Gail Dodge =

American nuclear physicist and educator

Gail Elizabeth Dodge is an American experimental nuclear physicist and educator. She acts as Dean of the College of Sciences and Professor of Physics at Old Dominion University (ODU), where she also conducts research using electron probes at Thomas Jefferson National Accelerator Facility. She has served a two-year term as program manager at the National Science Foundation (NSF) and was Chair of the Nuclear Science Advisory Committee (NSAC) for five years.

== Education and career ==
Dodge received her Bachelor in Arts in physics at Princeton in 1986 and her M.S and PhD in physics from Stanford University in 1988 and 1993 respectively. She worked as a postdoctoral research associate at Free University in Amsterdam before becoming a Professor of Physics at ODU in 1995, at which point she started her research at Jefferson Labs probing the underlying quarks and gluons that make up protons and neutrons. In 2012 she served a two-year term as program manager for the National Science Foundation (NSF)'s $17 million experimental nuclear physics program, where she also managed coordination with the Office of Nuclear Physics at the Department of Energy (DOE).

Dodge was Chair of the ODU Department of Physics for six years before assuming her current position of Dean of the College of Sciences in 2018. Additionally, she has acted as board member on the Jefferson Lab Users Board of Directors for two terms and has spent two years as a committee member for the American Physical Society (APS) Division of Nuclear Physics. She served as chair of the Nuclear Science Advisory Committee (NSAC), tasked with advising the DOE and NSF on the national program for basic nuclear science research, from 2021 until its termination in August, 2025. While there, she helped develop the 2023 NSAC Long Range Plan for Nuclear Science. Dodge's work with the Long Range Plan as well as her leadership in nuclear physics and experimental contributions resulted in her becoming an APS fellow in 2024.

== Honors and awards ==
- Luise Meyer-Schützmeister Memorial Award (1991)
- College of Sciences Faculty Excellence Award (2003)
- Gene W. Hirschfeld Faculty Excellence Award (2012)
- Slack Award (2013)
- Outstanding Faculty Award (2015)
