= Peter Bosted =

American physicist

- Education: Massachusetts Institute of Technology (B.S., Ph.D.)
- Known for: Electron scattering, nucleon structure
- Awards: Fellow of the American Physical Society (2016)
- Scientific career
- Fields: Experimental nuclear physics
- Thesis: Pion Photoproduction in the (3,3) Resonance Region (1980)
- Doctoral advisor: Aron Bernstein

Peter Bosted is an American physicist. He completed his Ph.D. in physics in January 1980 from Massachusetts Institute of Technology. His Ph.D. thesis title was "Pion Photoproduction in the (3,3) Resonance Region". His Ph.D. supervisor was Aron Bernstein. He did his B.S. degree in physics in June 1975 from the Massachusetts Institute of Technology (MIT). He did his post-doctoral training at MIT before he joined American University and served as a postdoctoral associate (1980-1985), associate research scientist (1985-1988), research associate professor (1988-1997), and research professor (1997-1999). Later, He joined the University of Massachusetts, Amherst, as a research professor. He has served at the Jefferson Laboratory as a senior staff scientist and also served at the College of Williams and Mary. He is currently involved in research at Thomas Jefferson National Accelerator Facility. He has published hundreds of research papers in reputable scientific journals. He was elected Fellow of the American Physical Society (APS) in 2016, recognized "For invaluable contributions to unraveling the structure of the proton and neutron via elastic, inelastic, and spin-dependent electron scattering from nucleons and nuclei."
