= Donnell Walton =

American physicist

- Born: November 8, 1966 (age 58)
- Education: North Carolina State University B.S. degree in physics and electrical engineering University of Michigan PhD in applied physics
- Awards: 2013 Outstanding Technical Contribution to Industry Award; 2021 ECE Willie Hobbs Moore Distinguished Lectureship

Donnell Walton (born November 8, 1966) is an American physicist who works at Corning West Technology Center (CWTC). He studied Physics at North Carolina State University, graduating with a BSc in Physics. He continued his education at the University of Michigan, receiving a PhD in applied physics. He is an outspoken advocate for encouraging diversity in Physics and he is a board member for the National Society of Black Physicists.

== Early life and education ==
Walton was born in Mount Clemens, Michigan on November 8, 1966. During his high school years, he participated in a science program which inspired him to pursue physics in college.

In 1989 he graduated from North Carolina State University with a B.S. degree in physics and electrical engineering and during this time he took up internships at IBM. Then in 1996, he graduated from the University of Michigan with a PhD in applied physics. During his time at the University of Michigan, Walton forged a friendship with Willie Hobbs Moore. Walton was awarded a post postdoctoral fellowship with AT&T Bell Laboratories from its Creative Research Fellowship Program and in 2019 he would he would complete the Executive Program at the Stanford Graduate School of Business.

== Career ==
Prior to graduating, Walton worked on research at Bell Labs in Washington D.C. After he graduated with his PhD he would work an assistant professor and one would be one of the founding members of the fiber laser and amplifier lab at Howard University. After he left the school in 1999 he would join with Corning Inc. in 2004 as a project manager. During this period he worked on several notable projects such as milliwatt amplifiers for DARPA the Gorilla Glass used in many electronics today. In 2017 Corning would expand to the West Coast and open Corning West Technology Center in Sunnyvale, CA where Walton has worked since its opening. During his career, Walton was involved in 22 different patents and he serves as a board member on the National Society of Black Physicists.

== Awards and honors ==
Walton was awarded the 2021 ECE Willie Hobbs Moore Distinguished Lectureship Award on November 4, 2021. Walton won the Outstanding Technical Contribution to Industry Award from U.S. Black Engineer and Information Technology in 2013.

== Publications ==
- Haynes, Marcus & McGowan, Matthew & Morton, Timothy & Tompkins, Paul & Walton, Donnell. (2014). Semitransparent electronic device.
- Kimball, Ronald & Knowlton, Robert & McCarthy, Joseph & Wang, Ji & Walton, Donnell & Zenteno, Luis. (2013). Optical fiber and method for making such fiber.
- Li, Ming-Jun & Chen, Xin & Liu, Anping & Gray, Stuart & Wang, Ji & Walton, Donnell & Zenteno, Luis. (2009). Limit of Effective Area for Single-Mode Operation in Step-Index Large Mode Area Laser Fibers. Journal of Lightwave Technology. 27. 3010–3016. 10.1109/JLT.2009.2020682.
- Liu, Anping & Chen, Xin & Li, Ming-Jun & Wang, Ji & Walton, Donnell & Zenteno, Luis. (2009). Comprehensive Modeling of Single Frequency Fiber Amplifiers for Mitigating Stimulated Brillouin Scattering. Journal of Lightwave Technology. 27. 2189–2198. 10.1109/JLT.2008.2005427.
