= Igor Zutic =

Croatian-American physicist

Igor Zutic (born July 15, 1967) is a Croatian-American physicist, focusing on spintronics and spin-polarized transport, high temperature and unconventional superconductivity, ferromagnetic semiconductors, theoretical nanoscience and computational physics at University of Buffalo and an Elected Fellow of the American Physical Society.
