= Carlos A. R. Sa de Melo =

Carlos A.R. Sa de Melo is a theoretical condensed matter physicist at the Georgia Institute of Technology. His research focuses on atomic and molecular systems.

== Education and career ==
Sa de Melo is a Professor in the Department of Physics at Georgia Tech, where he researches theoretical condensed matter and ultracold atomic and molecular physics. He received his PhD from Stanford University in 1991.

Sa de Melo's work focuses on superconductors, quantum magnets, superfluids and Bose-Einstein condensates. He is especially interested in the many body physics of condensed matter and atomic and molecular systems.

== Publications ==
Sa de Melo has published on atomic spin, quantum bubbles in microgravity, and dipolar bosons in optical lattices. He was the editor of the book The Superconducting State In Magnetic Fields.

== Honors and awards ==
In 2022, Sa de Melo was elected as a fellow of The American Association for the Advancement of Science. He is also a fellow of the American Physical Society.
