= Julie Roche =

Physicist

Julie Roche is a professor of physics at Ohio University. Her research concerns experimental particle physics, and more specifically the internal structure of protons and neutrons.

== Education and career ==
Roche received a Ph.D. from Blaise Pascal University in France in 1998. She was a postdoctoral researcher at The College of William and Mary from 1999 to 2002, and at the Jefferson Lab from 2003 to 2005.

She joined Ohio University as an assistant professor in 2006, while also continuing with a bridge appointment at the Jefferson Lab until 2009. She was promoted to associate professor in 2012 and full professor in 2018. She was named as director of the university's Institute for Nuclear and Particle Physics in 2020.

== Recognition ==
Roche was elected as a Fellow of the American Physical Society in 2025.

== Selected publications ==
- Deeply Virtual Compton Scattering Cross Section at High Bjorken x_{B}, F. Georges et al. (Jefferson Lab Hall A Collaboration) Phys. Rev. Lett. 128, 252002 â€“2022
- Deep Exclusive Electroproduction of π0 at High Q2 in the Quark Valence Regime, M. Dlamini et al. (Jefferson Lab Hall A Collaboration) Phys.Rev.Lett. 127 (2021) 15, 152301
- Deeply virtual Compton scattering off the neutron, M. Benali and the Hall A DVCS collaboration, Nature Physics, January 2020
- Precision measurement of the weak charge of the proton Nature 557, 207-211
