= Marcus Cicerone =

American physicist

Marcus T. Cicerone is an American physicist, physical chemist, and inventor. His research focuses on noninvasive spectroscopic imaging and dynamics in amorphous condensed phase matter. He is currently Professor of Chemistry at the Georgia Institute of Technology and an Elected Fellow of the American Physical Society.

He is known for his introduction of broadband coherent anti-Stokes microscopy, a label-free microscopy that provides quantitative Raman spectra in biological and synthetic materials.

He holds patents in optical technologies and stabilization of biologically active materials (proteins, mRNA, etc.).

== Awards ==
- Arthur S. Flemming Award - 2017
- Fellow of the American Physical Society - 2016
- The Washington Academy of Sciences Physical & Biological Sciences Award - 2015
- BioPhotonics Magazine Top 10 Innovations – 2014
- AAPS Innovation in Biotechnology Award (with post-doc Ken Qian) – 2014
- Department of Commerce Bronze Award – 2012
- Department of Commerce Bronze Award – 2008
- Johnson & Johnson Corporate Office of Research Directors Research Fellowship – 1998
- IBM Polymer Science & Technology Predoctoral Fellow – 1993
- Department of Education Predoctoral Fellow – 1992
- Pergamon/Spectrochimica Acta Atomic Spectroscopy Award - Honorable Mention – 1989

== Personal life ==
Dr. Cicerone was born in 1962 to Arthur Cicerone and Violet Swedin. He married his college sweetheart in 1986 and the couple have two children.
