= Alexander Abanov =

American physicist

- Education: University of Chicago
- Known for: 2016 Fellow of the American Physical Society
- Scientific career
- Fields: Condensed matter physics
- Institutions: Stony Brook University
- Thesis: Interference effects in strongly correlated electronic systems (1997)

Alexander (or Alexandre) G. Abanov is an American physicist working in the field of theoretical condensed matter physics. He received his Ph.D. from The University of Chicago in 1997 and is currently a professor of physics at Stony Brook University. He was elected as Fellow of the American Physical Society in 2016.
