= Chandre Dharma-wardana =

Sri Lankan–born academic and scientist

Professor Chandre Dharma-wardana
- Born: Colombo, Sri Lanka
- Citizenship: Canadian
- Education: University of Ceylon; Royal College, Colombo; Ananda College Colombo; University of Cambridge
- Children: 0
- Scientific career
- Fields: Chemistry, physics,
- Workplaces: National Research Council of Canada, Université de Montreal.

Chandre Dharma-wardana is a Sri Lankan-born academic and scientist. A former president of Vidyodaya Campus (now the University of Sri Jayewardenepura), he is currently (1993-present) a professor of theoretical physics at the Université de Montréal. He has retired from his position as a principal research scientist at the National Research Council of Canada.

== Education ==
Educated at Aluthgama Vidyalaya, Ananda College and at Royal College, Colombo Dharma-wardana earned a BSc (Hon.) from the University of Ceylon in 1961, and a doctorate from the University of Cambridge, (Corpus Christi College) for a thesis on quantum calculations on atoms and molecules, and the Heisenberg model of magnetism.

== Academic career ==
Dharma-wardana joined Vidyodaya University in 1969 as a senior lecturer, and was later appointed as professor of chemistry. He was appointed as president of the Vidyodaya Campus by Badi-ud-din Mahmud in 1974. During his tenure as the academic head of the institution Dharma-wardana attempted to move the academic programs to a course unit system, introduce mandatory basic standards in English competency, developed curricula for teaching science in Sinhala to students who had little or no English, and streamline academic departments. Opposition to the latter by older academics, and the opposition of the student unions (led by student leaders S. B. Dissanayake and Mahinda Wijesekera) to mandatory English learning were factors that led to his resignation in 1975. He returned to the University of Paris, Orsay in 1975 and to Canada in 1978. During his period as a member of the Vidyodya science faculty (1969-1975) he also held associate appointments with the Université de Paris, Orsay via the CECAM institute, associated with the French Atomic Energy Commission, and the CNRS. Currently, he is affiliated with the National Research Council of Canada (NRCC) and the Université de Montréal, and works on various topics in the quantum theory, nanotechnology, warm dense matter and laser fusion.

== Fields of research ==
Dharma-wardana has worked on a wide variety of scientific topics, where the unifying theme is the application of the quantum theory, usually to many-body problems. His work focused on quantum field theory, statistical mechanics, and solid state physics associated with Raman scattering, energy-relaxation and phonons in nanostructures, quantum Hall effect, the physics of nanotubes and graphene. He worked on a variety of topics such as surface passivisation, quantum dots, organic light-emitting diodes and related nanostructures, energy-relaxation etc., in collaboration with researchers at the NRC, Universities or research institutions in Montreal, Toronto, British Columbia, Livermore, Los Alamos and Paris. A main area of Prof. Dharma-wardana's research has been in many-body theory and plasma physics, often in collaboration with François Perrot of the French Atomic Energy commission. The neutral-pseudo atom model (NPA) for warm dense matter is one of their main contributions of great practical value where finite-temperature density functional theory has been used to formulate a rigorous quantum mechanical approach to hot ionized matter. Subsequently, the construction of the classical-map scheme for quantum systems is a ground-breaking work, leading to the formulation of the classical-map hyper-netted chain method (CHNC). This method has led to a new approach for the evaluation of properties of Fermi liquids and warm-dense matter. His previous work on the density-functional theory of dense plasmas is now well-established in the NPA model. It has led to the development of methods for the first-principles evaluation of the equation of state, and the transport properties of dense plasmas. His contributions to the energy-relaxation of hot electrons in semiconductors and also in plasmas, have presented a new direction in the theory of non-equilibrium states of two-temperature charged fluids. His paper elucidating the unusual thermal conductivity of clathrates still attracts many citations. His contributions to surface science (e.g. reconstruction of the sulphur-passivated InP surface), nanotechnology, phonons in semiconductor structures, quasi-periodic systems etc., are well known and are contained in over 200 research publications. Dharma-wardana currently serves as a principal research scientist at the National Research Council of Canada, and is a professor of theoretical physics at the Université de Montréal. His most recent book on physics is entitled A Physicist's View of Matter and Mind, published in 2013 by World Scientific.

See also Whose Who, Canada.

== Contributions to development studies and Sri Lankan studies ==
Dharma-wardana has also contributed to development studies in Sri Lanka, and founded the 'Bachelor of Development Studies (B. Dev.) degree during his tenure as the President of Vidyodaya University. He was invited to talk about a web site of place names maintained by him, at a conference organised by the Royal Asiatic Society of Sri Lanka. He also maintains a website dealing with the ethno-botany of plants in Sri Lanka, where the Sinhala, Sanskrit and Tamil names of the systematic botanical (i.e., Latin) names are followed up with details of ethnographic interest. Prof. Dharmawardana heads a project (WC4SL) for delivering free wheel chairs to rural hospitals and disabled people of Sri Lanka; it has operated since the end of the Eelam wars in 2009.

At Vidyodaya University, Dharma-wardana held the title of a professor of chemistry, and was instrumental in establishing studies in polymer science in association with the Rubber Research Institute of Sri Lanka. He also initiated academic programs and course units in food technology and environmental science. These were pioneering areas of study for a Sri Lankan university. Today, food science has grown into a full department and plays a vital national role. He has continued his interest in various aspects of environmental science. Professor Dharma-wardana has recently engaged himself in trying to unravel the origins of the mysterious kidney disease that has appeared (since 1992) in the North Central Province (NCP) of Sri Lanka, and now rising to near epidemic proportions, killing thousands of people. The disease has similarities to Danubian endemic familial nephropathy or DEFN. The cause of the disease is unknown and hence it is called chronic kidney disease of unknown aetiology (CKDu) by medical scientists. A paper authored by him and three other well-known Sri Lankan scientists appeared in the journal Environmental Health and Geochemistry setting the trend for a new paradigm regarding CKDu and multiple interactions among ions and their effect on toxicity. He has been a frequent writer on sustainable food production, energy sources, environmental matters, publishing in Sri Lankan newspapers and peer-reviewed journals.

== Contributions to industry ==
Dharma-wardana was a director of the LankaSam Leather Products corporation from 1970 to 1974, which took over the "DI" brand of shoes, and ran a tannery, and has been a technical advisor to the Sri Lankan Ministry of Industries under Minister Tikiri Banda Subasinghe. Some of Dharma-wardana's publications on agricultural and environmental topics published jointly with other authors, such ason biofilm-biofertilizers, control of white-flies in coconut plantations, are available in open-source pre-print archives or as journal publications.

== See also ==
- Classical-map hypernetted-chain method
- Classical fluids, Quantum fluid
- Density functional theory
