= Quantum turbulence =

Quantum turbulence is the name given to the turbulent flow – the chaotic motion of a fluid at high flow rates – of quantum fluids, such as superfluids. The idea that a form of turbulence might be possible in a superfluid via the quantized vortex lines was first suggested by Richard Feynman. The dynamics of quantum fluids are governed by quantum mechanics, rather than classical physics which govern classical (ordinary) fluids. Some examples of quantum fluids include superfluid helium (^{4}He and Cooper pairs of ^{3}He), Bose–Einstein condensates (BECs), polariton condensates, and nuclear pasta theorized to exist inside neutron stars. Quantum fluids exist at temperatures below the critical temperature $T_\text{c}$ at which Bose-Einstein condensation takes place.

== General properties of superfluids ==
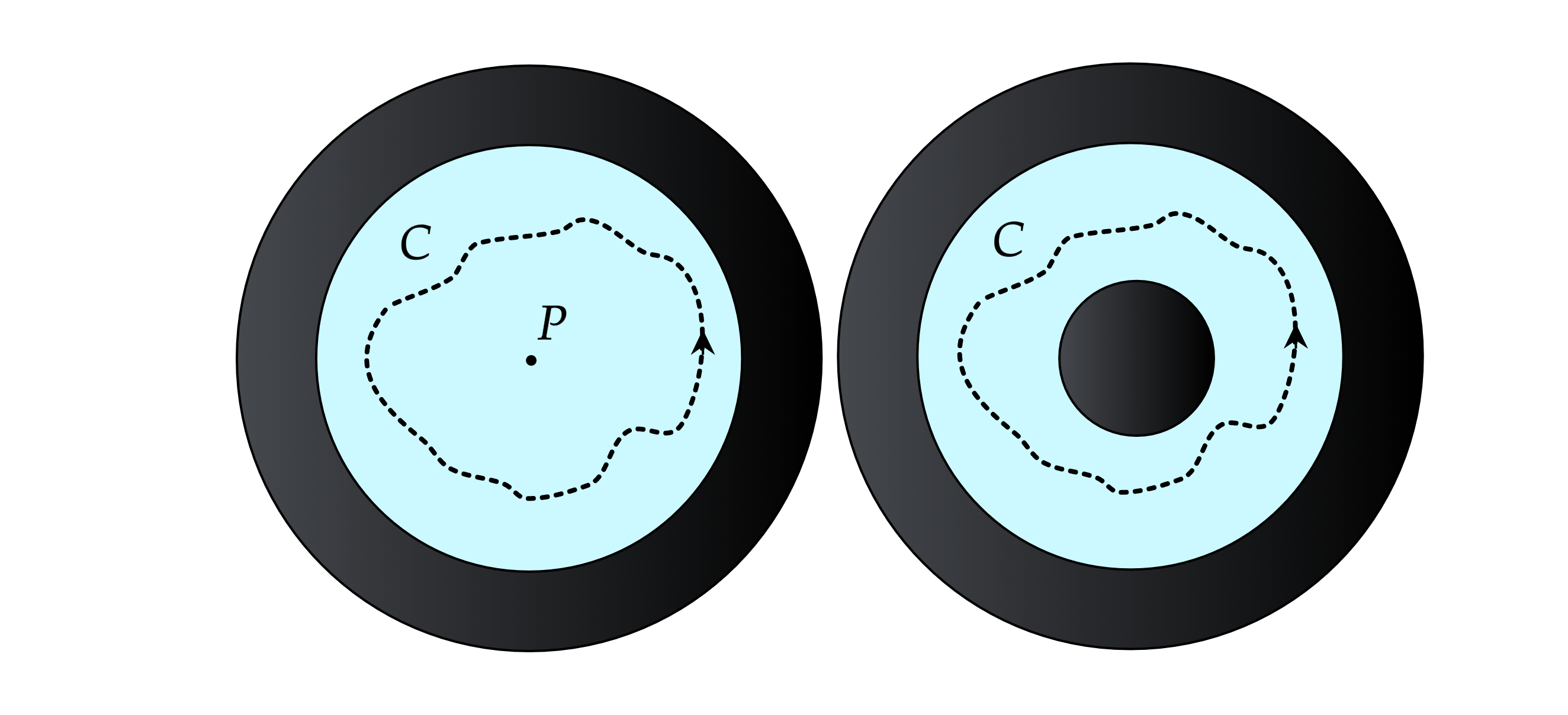
Fig 1. The schematic diagram of a fluid (blue) in a cylindrical container. Left: The curve $C$ traces out a closed path in a simply connected region. The path can be shrunk down to the point $P$, and therefore Stokes theorem can be applied. For a quantum fluid, this indicates that the circulation vanishes. Right: The curve $C$ traces out a closed path in a multiply-connected region (i.e. with holes). The path cannot be shrunk down due to the hole, and therefore Stokes theorem does not hold, leading to a non-zero, quantized circulation. For a quantum fluid, this suggests that vortex structures act like 'holes'.

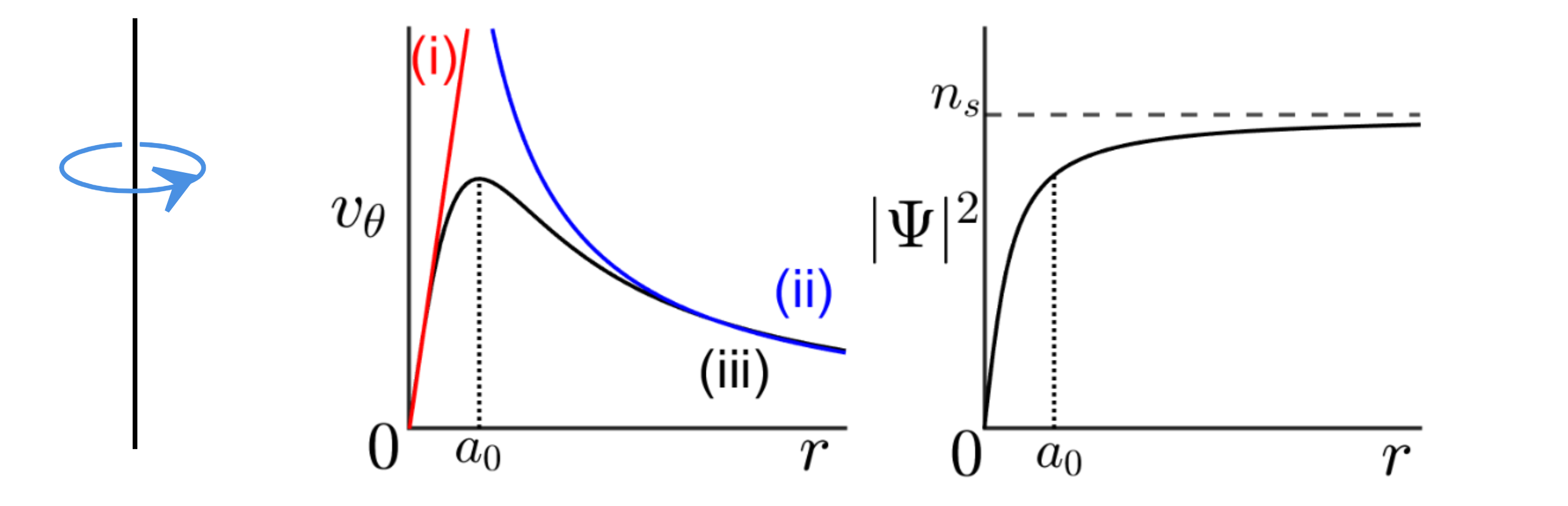
Fig 2. Left: Simple schematic of a straight vortex line in 3-dimensional space, with positive circulation. Middle: Azimuthal velocity against the radius. (i) shows the fluid speed of a solid-body rotation. (ii) shows the fluid speed of a vortex in both classical and quantum fluids. (iii) a combination of (i) and (ii) to form a Rankine vortex model for a tornado with core of size $a_0$. Right: Number density against radius of a quantum fluid with vortex $a_0$. Density depletion can be observed for a small radius $r < a_0$. The quantity $n_\text{s}$ represents the density of the fluid sufficiently far away from the vortex core $r > a_0$.

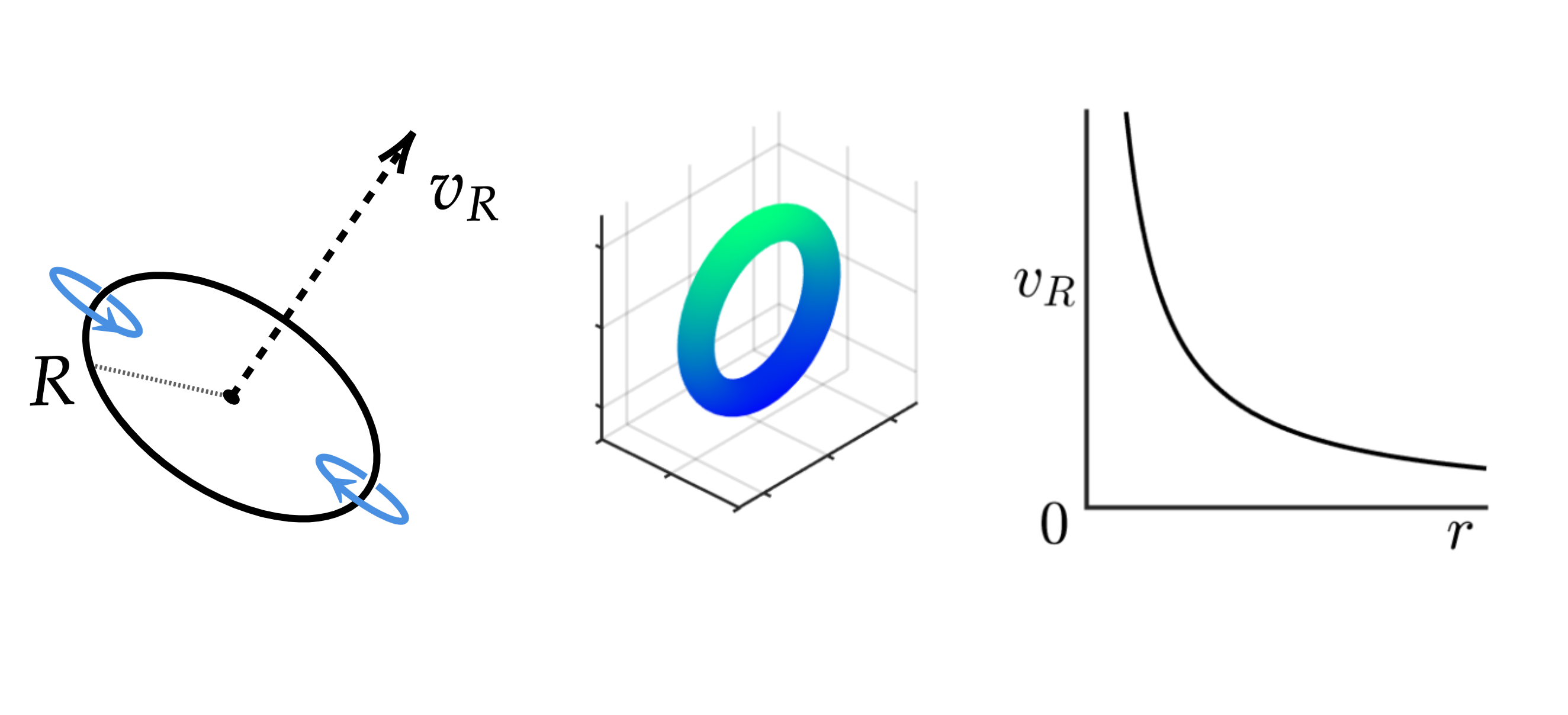
Fig 3. Left: Schematic of a vortex ring of radius $R$ moving at a speed $v_R$. Middle: 3-dimensional schematic of a quantum vortex ring. The velocity of the ring is generated by the ring itself, which propels itself at a velocity that is inversely proportional to the radius of the ring. The thickness of the ring is greatly exaggerated for the purpose of being able to view the torus-like shape. In reality, for helium II the thickness is approximately 10^{−10} m. Right: The velocity profile of the vortex ring against its size. An inverse relationship can be viewed. This suggests that smaller rings move at a much faster speed, while larger rings move at a much slower speed.

The turbulence of quantum fluids has been studied primarily in two quantum fluids: liquid helium and atomic condensates. Experimental observations have been made in the two stable isotopes of helium, the common ^{4}He and the rare ^{3}He. The latter isotope has two phases, named the A-phase and the B-phase. The A-phase is strongly anisotropic, and although it has very interesting hydrodynamic properties, turbulence experiments have been performed almost exclusively in the B-phase. Helium liquidizes at a temperature of approximately 4 K. At this temperature, the fluid behaves like a classical fluid with extraordinarily small viscosity, referred to as helium I. After further cooling, helium I undergoes Bose–Einstein condensation into a superfluid, referred to as helium II. The critical temperature $T_\text{c}$ for Bose–Einstein condensation of helium is 2.17 K (at the saturated vapour pressure), while only approximately a few millikelvin for ^{3}He–B.

Although in atomic condensates there is not as much experimental evidence for turbulence as in helium, experiments have been performed with rubidium, sodium, caesium, lithium and other elements. The critical temperature for these systems is of the order of micro-Kelvin.

There are two fundamental properties of quantum fluids that distinguish them from classical fluids: superfluidity and quantized circulation.

=== Superfluidity ===
Superfluidity arises as a consequence of the dispersion relation of elementary excitations, and fluids that exhibit this behaviour flow without viscosity. This is a vital property for quantum turbulence as viscosity in classical fluids causes dissipation of kinetic energy into heat, damping out motion of the fluid. Landau predicted that if a superfluid flows faster than a certain critical velocity $v_\text{c}$ (or alternatively an object moves faster than $v_\text{c}$ in a static fluid) thermal excitations (rotons) are emitted as it becomes energetically favourable to generate quasiparticles, resulting in the fluid no longer exhibiting superfluid properties. For helium II, this critical velocity is $v_\text{c} \approx 60 \text{m/s}$.

=== Quantized circulation ===
The property of quantized circulation arises as a consequence of the existence and uniqueness of a complex macroscopic wavefunction $\Psi$, which affects the vorticity (local rotation) in a very profound way, making it crucial for quantum turbulence.

The velocity and density of the fluid can be recovered from the wavefunction $\Psi(\mathbf{x},t)$ by writing it in polar form $\Psi(\mathbf{x},t) = |\Psi(\mathbf{x},t)|e^{i\phi(\mathbf{x},t)}$, where $|\Psi|$ is the magnitude of $\Psi$ and $\phi$ is the phase. The velocity of the fluid is then $\mathbf{v}(\mathbf{x},t) = (\hbar/m)\nabla \phi$, and the number density is $n(\mathbf{x},t) = \vert \Psi \vert^2$. The mass density is related to the number density by $\rho(\mathbf{x},t) = mn$, where $m$ is the mass of one boson.

The circulation $\Gamma$ is defined to be the line integral along a simple closed path $C$ within the fluid

$$\Gamma = \oint_C \mathbf{v} \cdot \mathbf{dr}$$

For a simply-connected surface $S$, Stokes theorem holds, and the circulation vanishes, as the velocity can be expressed as the gradient of the phase. For a multiply-connected surface, the phase difference between an arbitrary initial point on the curve $C$ and the final point (same as initial point as $C$ is closed) must be $2\pi q$, where $q=0,1,2,\cdots$ in order for the wavefunction to be single-valued. This leads to a quantized value for the circulation

$$\Gamma = \frac{\hbar}{m} \oint_C \nabla S \cdot \mathbf{dr} = q\kappa$$

where $\kappa = h/m$ is the quantum of circulation, and the integer $q$ is the charge (or winding number) of the vortex. Multiply charged vortices ($q>1$) in helium II are unstable and for this reason in most practical applications $q=1$. It is energetically favourable for the fluid to form $q$ singly-charged vortices rather than a single vortex of charge $q$, and so a multiply-charged vortex would split into singly-charged vortices. Under certain conditions, it is possible to generate certain vortices with a charge higher than 1.

=== Properties of vortex lines ===
Vortex lines are topological line defects of the phase. Their nucleation makes the quantum fluid's region to become a multiply-connected region. As given by Fig 2, density depletion can be observed near the axis, with $\rho = 0$ on the vortex line. The size of the vortex core varies between different quantum fluids. The size of the vortex core is around $a_0 = 10^{-10}~\text{m}$ for helium II, $a_0 = 10^{-8}~\text{m}$ for ^{3}He–B and for typical atomic condensates $a_0 = 10^{-4}~\text{m}$. The simplest vortex system in a quantum fluid consists of a single straight vortex line; the velocity field of such configuration is purely azimuthal given by $v_{\theta} = \kappa/{2\pi r}$. This is the same formula as for a classical vortex line solution of the Euler equations, however, classically, this model is physically unrealistic as the velocity diverges as $r \rightarrow 0$. This leads to the idea of the Rankine vortex as shown in fig 2, which combines solid body rotation for small $r$ and vortex motion for large values of $r$, and is a more realistic model of ordinary classical vortices.

Many similarities can be drawn with vortices in classical fluids, for example the fact that vortex lines obey the classical Kelvin circulation theorem: the circulation is conserved and the vortex lines must terminate at boundaries or exist in the shape of closed loops. In the zero temperature limit, a point on a vortex line will travel accordingly to the velocity field that is generated at that point by the other parts of the vortex line, provided that the vortex line is not straight (an isolated straight vortex does not move). The velocity can also be generated by any other vortex lines in the fluid, a phenomenon also present in classical fluids. A simple example of this is a vortex ring (a torus-shaped vortex) which moves at a self-induced velocity $v_R$ inversely proportional to the radius of the ring $R$, where $R \gg a_0$. The whole ring moves at a velocity

$$v_R = \frac{\kappa}{4\pi R}\left[\ln{\left(\frac{8R}{a_0}\right)} - \frac{1}{2}\right]$$

=== Kelvin waves and vortex reconnections ===
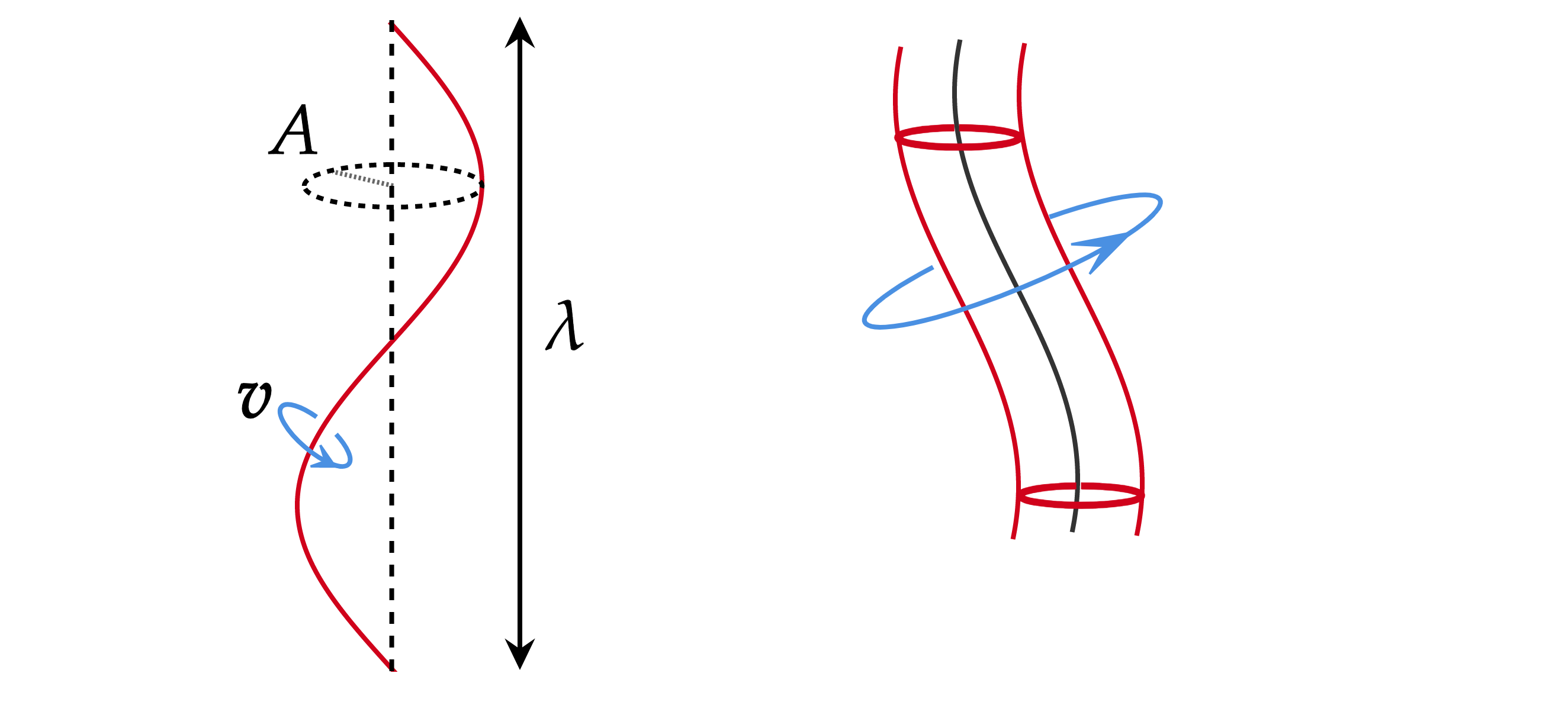
Fig 4. Left: Schematic of a Kelvin wave with amplitude $A$ and wavelength $\lambda$. Right: A straight vortex configuration that has been perturbed into a bent vortex configuration.

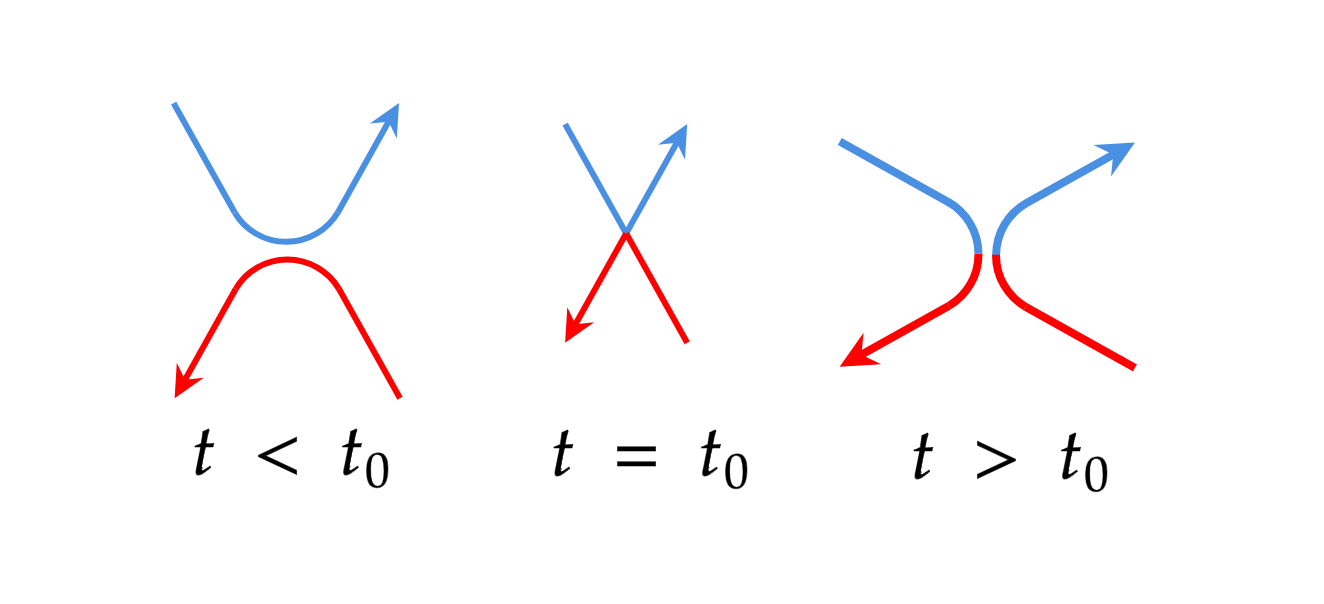
Fig 5. Schematic of vortex reconnection of two vortices. The arrows on the vortices represent the direction of the vorticity in the vortex line. Left: Before the reconnection. Middle: The vortex reconnection is taking place. Right: after the reconnection.

Vortices in quantum fluids support Kelvin waves, which are helical perturbations of a vortex line away from its straight configuration that rotate at an angular velocity $\omega$, with

$$\omega \approx \frac{\kappa k^2}{4 \pi}\ln{\left(\frac{1}{ka_0}\right)}$$

Here $k=2\pi/\lambda$ where $\lambda$ is the wavelength and $k$ is the wave vector.

Travelling vortices in quantum fluids can interact with each other, resulting in reconnections of vortex lines and ultimately changing the topology of the vortex configuration when they collide as suggested by Richard Feynman. At non-zero temperatures the vortex lines scatter thermal excitations, which creates a friction force with the normal fluid component (thermal cloud for atomic condensates). This phenomenon leads to the dissipation of kinetic energy. For example, vortex rings will shrink, and Kelvin waves will decrease in amplitude.

=== Vortex lattice ===
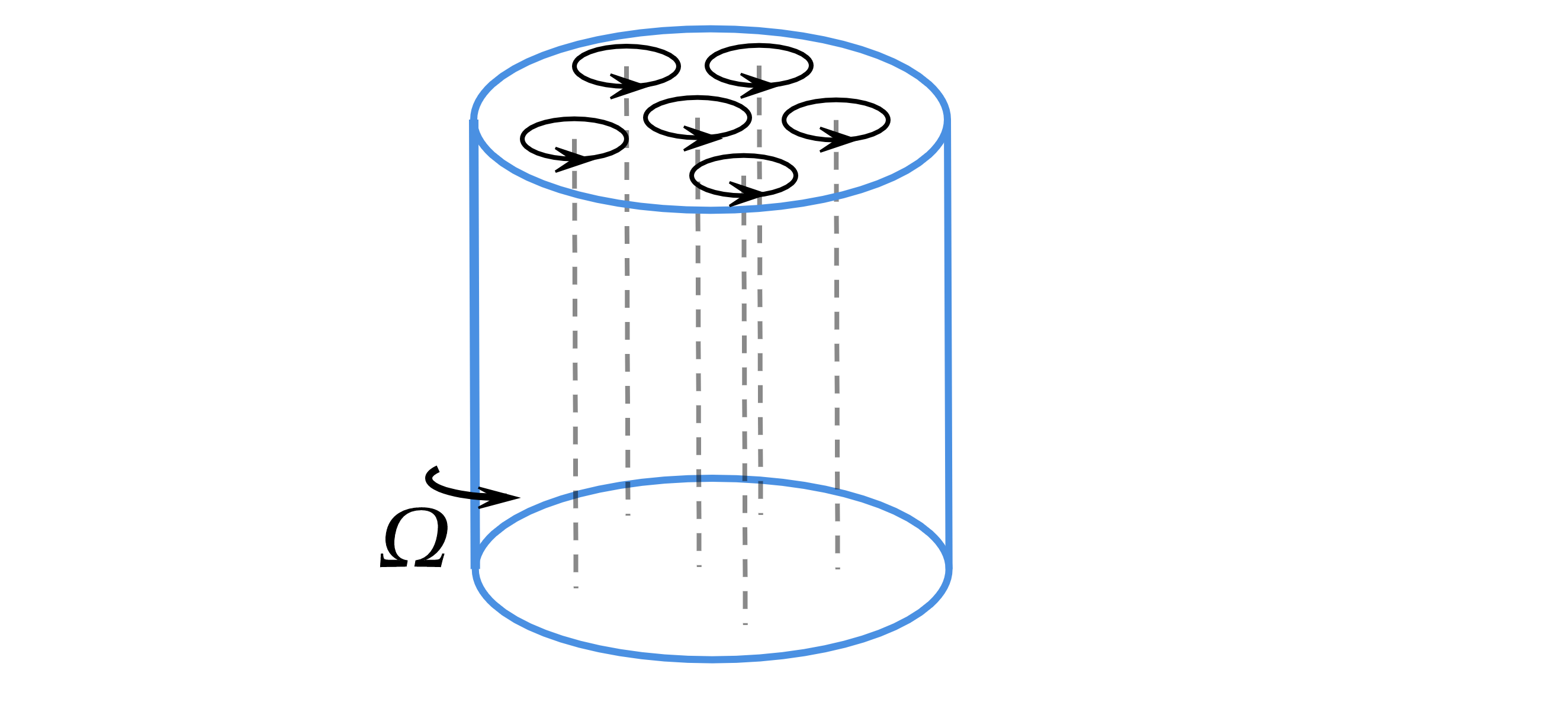
Fig 6. Schematic of a cylindrical container rotating at a speed of $\Omega$, forming a vortex lattice of six straight vortex lines.

Vortex lattices are laminar (ordered) configurations of vortex lines that can be created by rotating the system. For a cylindrical vessel of radius $R$, a condition can be derived for the formation of a vortex lattice by minimising the expression $F' = F - \mathbf{L}_v\cdot\mathbf{\Omega}$, where $F$ is the free energy, $\mathbf{L}_v$ is the angular momentum of the fluid and $\mathbf{\Omega}$ is the rotation, with magnitude $\Omega$ and axial direction. The critical velocity for the appearance of a vortex lattice is then

$$\Omega^1_\text{c} = \frac{\kappa}{R^2}\ln{\left(\frac{R}{a_0}\right)} .$$

Exceeding this velocity allows for a vortex to form in the fluid. States with more vortices can be formed by increasing the rotation further, past the next critical velocities $\Omega_\text{c}^2,\,\Omega_\text{c}^3, \cdots$. The vortices arrange themselves into ordered configurations that are called vortex lattices.

=== Two fluid nature ===
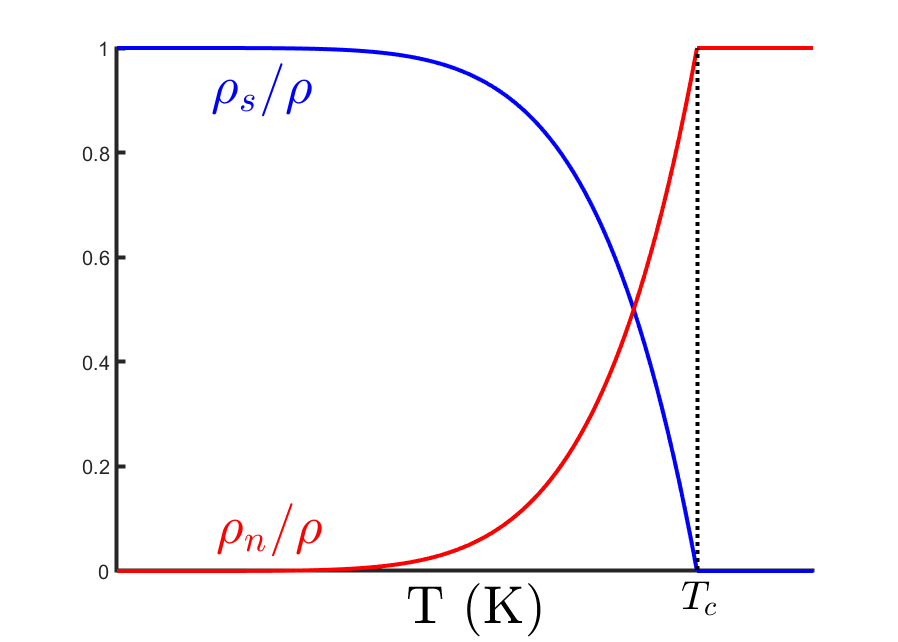
Fig 7. Component fractions plotted against the temperature, displaying the mixture of normal fluid and superfluid in helium II, where $\rho_\text{s}/\rho$ is the superfluid fraction, and $\rho_\text{n}/\rho$ is the normal fluid fraction. For temperatures above the critical temperature, the normal fluid makes up the whole fluid.

At non-zero temperature $T$, thermal effects must be taken into account. For atomic gases at non-zero temperatures, a fraction of the atoms are not part of the condensate, but rather form a rarefied (large free mean path) thermal cloud that co-exist with the condensate (which, in the first approximation, can be identified with the superfluid component). Since helium is a liquid, not a dilute gas like atomic condensates, there is a much stronger interaction between atoms, and the condensate is only a part of the superfluid component. Thermal excitations (consisting of phonons and rotons) form a viscous fluid component (very short free mean path, analogous to classical viscous fluid governed by the Navier–Stokes equations), called the normal fluid which coexists with the superfluid component. This forms the basis of Tisza's and Landau's two-fluid theory describing helium II as the mixture of co-penetrating superfluid and normal fluid components, with a total density dictated by the equation ${{{1}}}$. The table displays the key properties of the superfluid and normal fluid components:

Component	velocity	density	entropy	viscosity
superfluid	$\mathbf{v}_\text{s}$	$\rho_\text{s}$	zero	zero
classical fluid	$\mathbf{v}_\text{n}$	$\rho_\text{n}$	$S$	$\mu$

The relative proportions of the two components change with temperature, from an all normal fluid flow at the transition temperature $T_\text{c}$ ($\rho_\text{n}/\rho \rightarrow 1$ and $\rho_\text{s}/\rho \rightarrow 0$), to a complete superfluid flow in the zero temperature limit ($\rho_\text{s}/\rho \rightarrow 1$ and $\rho_\text{n}/\rho \rightarrow 0$). At small velocities, the two-fluid equations are

$$\frac{\partial \rho}{\partial t} + \nabla \cdot (\rho_\text{s} \mathbf{v}_\text{s} + \rho_\text{n} \mathbf{v}_\text{n}) = 0$$
$$\frac{\partial(\rho S)}{\partial t} + \nabla \cdot (\rho S \mathbf{v}_\text{n}) = 0$$
$$\rho_\text{s}\left[ \frac{\partial \mathbf{v}_\text{s}}{\partial t} + (\mathbf{v}_\text{s} \cdot \nabla)\mathbf{v}_\text{s}\right]  = -\frac{\rho_\text{s}}{\rho}\nabla P + \rho_\text{s} S \nabla T$$
$$\rho_\text{n}\left[ \frac{\partial \mathbf{v}_\text{n}}{\partial t} + (\mathbf{v}_\text{n} \cdot \nabla)\mathbf{v}_\text{n}\right]  = -\frac{\rho_\text{n}}{\rho}\nabla P - \rho_\text{s} S \nabla T + \mu \nabla^2 \mathbf{v}_\text{n}$$

where $P$ is the pressure, $S$ is the entropy per unit mass and $\mu$ is the viscosity of the normal fluid component as given by the table above. The first of these equations can be identified as being the conservation of mass equation, while the second equation can be identified as the conservation of entropy. The results of these equations give rise to the phenomena of second sound and thermal counterflow. At large velocities the superfluid becomes turbulent and vortex lines appear; at even larger velocities both normal fluid and superfluid become turbulent.

== Classical vs quantum turbulence ==
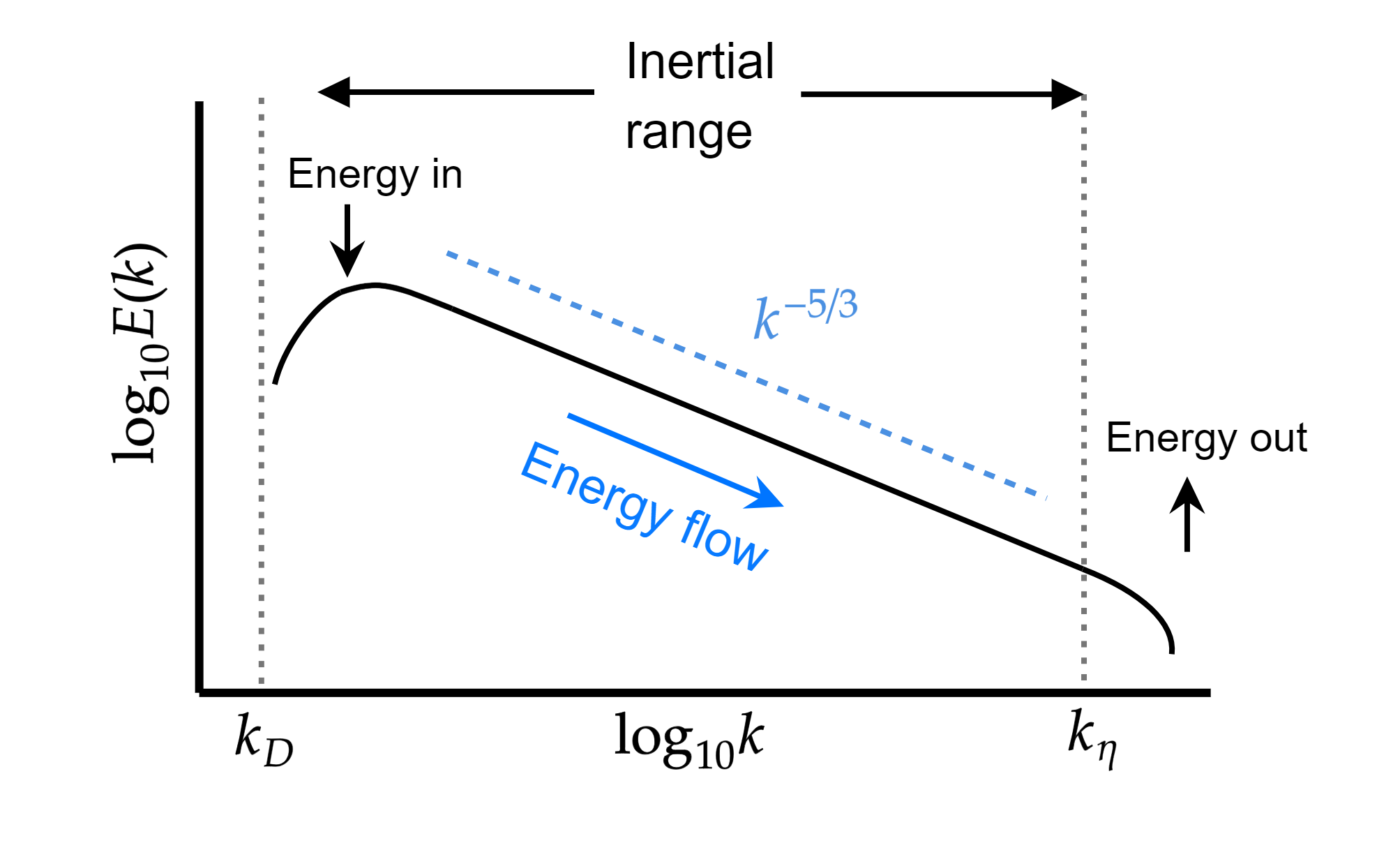
Fig 8. Schematic diagram of the Kolmogorov energy cascade inside of a wind tunnel. The injection of air occurs at $k_D = 2\pi/D$ where $D$ is the size of the wind tunnel. The quantity $k_{\eta}$, the Kolmogorov wavenumber, is the value in k-space associated to the Kolmogorov length scale, the point at which the turbulent kinetic energy is dissipated into heat.

Experiments and numerical solutions show that quantum turbulence is an apparently random tangle of vortex lines inside a quantum fluid. The study of quantum turbulence aims to explore two main questions:

1. Are vortex tangles really random, or do they contain some characteristic properties or organised structures?
2. How does quantum turbulence compare with classical turbulence?

To understand quantum turbulence it is useful to make connection with the turbulence of classical fluids. The turbulence of classical fluids is an everyday phenomenon, which can be readily observed in the flow of a stream or river as was first done by Leonardo da Vinci in his famous sketches. When turning on a water tap, one notices that at first the water flows out in a regular fashion (called laminar flow), but if the tap is turned up to higher flow rates, the flow becomes decorated with irregular bulges, unpredictably splitting into multiple strands as it spatters out in an ever-changing torrent, known as turbulent flow. Leonardo da Vinci first observed and noted in his private notebooks that turbulent flows of classical fluids include areas of circulating fluid called vortices (or eddies).

The simplest case of classical turbulence is that of homogeneous isotropic turbulence (HIT) held in a statistical steady state. Such turbulence can be created inside of a wind tunnel, for example a channel with air flow propelled by a fan from one side to the other. It is often equipped with a mesh to create a turbulent flow of air. A statistically steady state ensures that the main properties of the flow stabilises even though they fluctuate locally. Due to presence of viscosity, without the continuous supply of energy the turbulence of the flow will decay because of frictional forces. In the wind tunnel, energy is consistently provided by the fan. It is useful to introduce the concept of energy distribution over the length scales, the wavevector $\mathbf{k} = (k_x,k_y,k_z)$, and the wavenumber $k = \vert \mathbf{k} \vert$. In one dimension, the wavenumber can be related to the wavelength simply using $k = 2\pi/\lambda$. The total energy $E_\text{tot}$ per unit mass is given by

$$E_\text{tot} = \frac{1}{\mathcal{V}}\int_{\mathcal{V}}\frac{\mathbf{v}^2}{2}\, \mathrm{d}^3\mathbf{r}
= \int_{0}^{\infty}E(k)\, \mathrm{d}k$$

where $E(k)$ is the energy spectrum, essentially representing the distribution of turbulent kinetic energy over the wavenumbers. The notion of an energy cascade, where an energy transfer takes place from large scale vortices to smaller scale vortices, which eventually lead to viscous dissipation, was memorably noted by Lewis Fry Richardson. Dissipation occurs at the dissipation length scales $\eta$ (termed the Kolmogorov length scale), where $\eta = (\nu^3/\varepsilon)^{1/4}$ where $\nu$ is the kinematic viscosity. By the pioneering work of Andrey Kolmogorov, the energy spectrum was found to take the form

$$E(k) = C \varepsilon^{\frac{2}{3}}k^{-\frac{5}{3}}$$

where $\varepsilon$ is the energy dissipation rate per unit volume $-\mathrm{d}E/\mathrm{d}t$. The constant $C$ is a dimensionless constant, that takes the value $C \approx 1.5$. In k-space the value associated to the Kolmogorov length scale is the Kolmogorov wavenumber $k_{\eta}$, where viscous dissipation occurs.

=== Kolmogorov cascade in quantum fluids ===
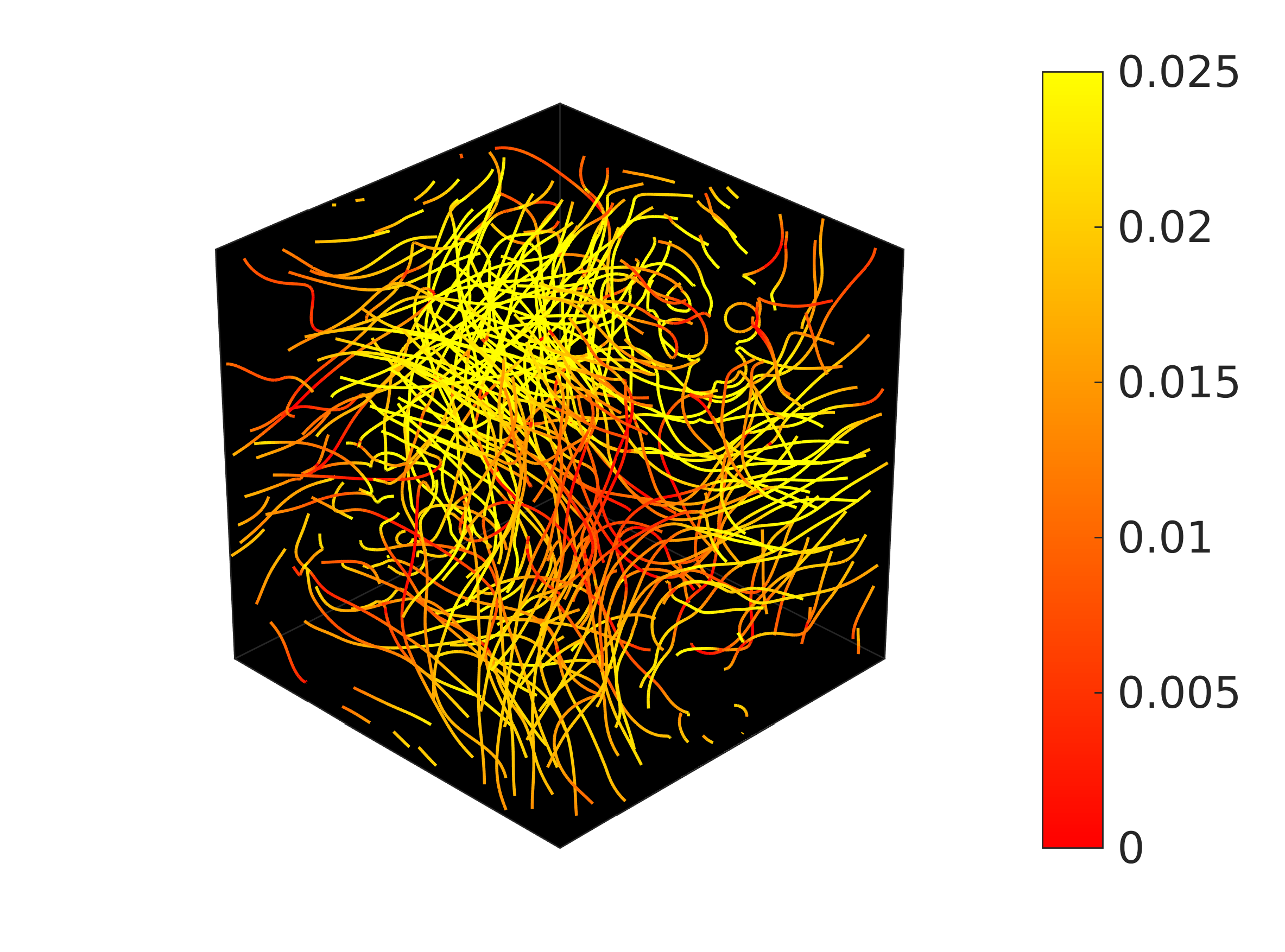
Fig 9a. Numerically simulated vortex tangle representing Kolmogorov quantum turbulence. The thin lines represent vortex lines inside of a cubic container. The colorbar represents the amount of non-local interaction, i.e. the amount by how much a section of the vortex line is affected by the other vortex lines surrounding it. (Credit AW Baggaley)

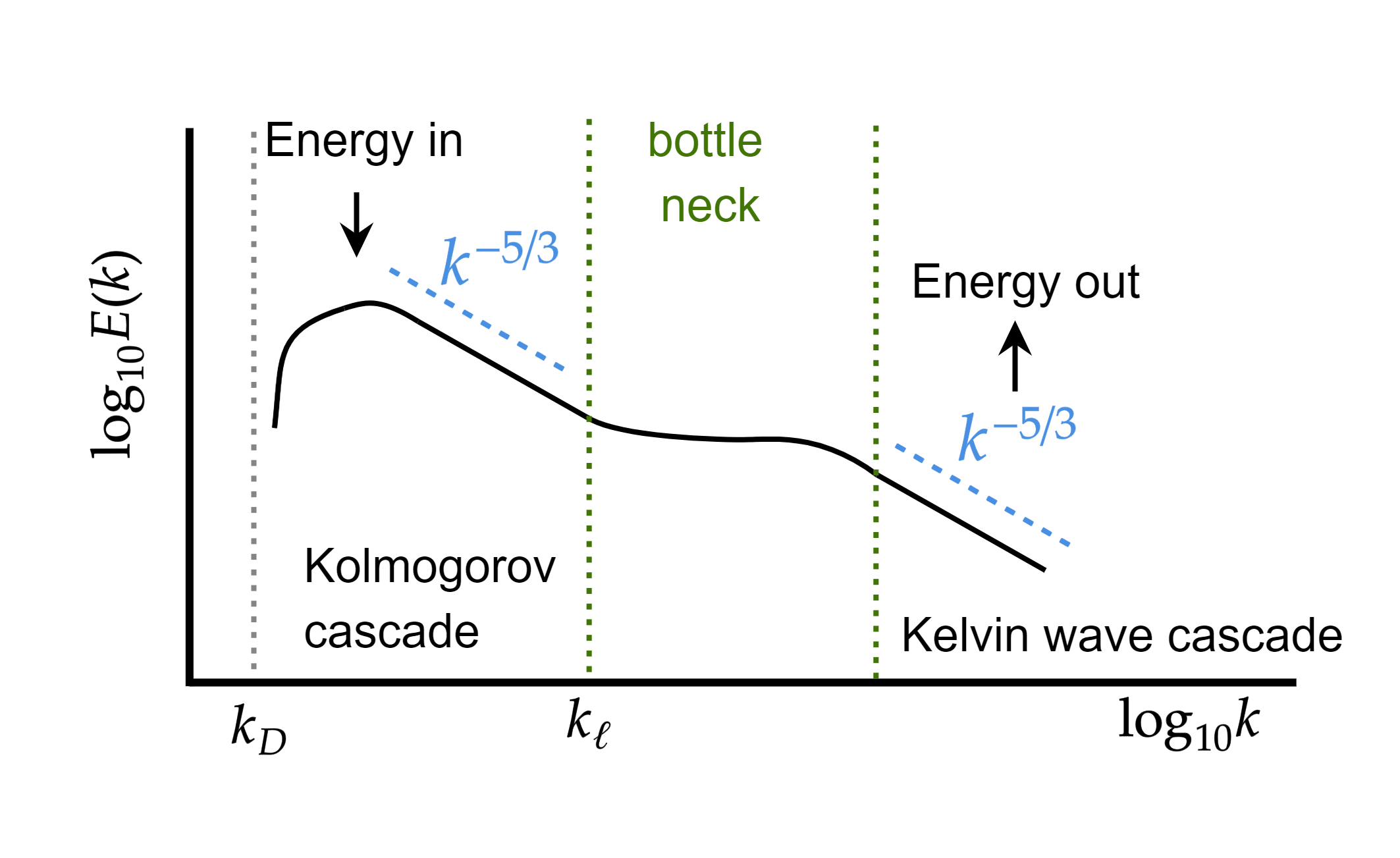
Fig 9. Schematic diagram of the energy spectrum for Kolmogorov turbulence at very small temperatures. The $k^{-5/3}$ energy cascade is present for large length scales, and a Kelvin wave cascade can be observed for very small length scales which undergoes sound emission. A bottleneck pile up occurs around the quantum length scale $\ell$.

For temperatures low enough for quantum mechanical effects to govern the fluid, quantum turbulence is a seemingly chaotic tangle of vortex lines with a highly knotted topology, which move each other and reconnect when they collide. In a pure superfluid, there is no normal component to carry the entropy of the system and therefore the fluid flows without viscosity, resulting in the lack of a dissipation scale $\eta$. Analogously to classical fluids, a quantum length scale $\ell$ (and the corresponding value in k-space $k_{\ell}$) can be introduced by replacing the kinematic viscosity in the Kolmogorov length scale with the quantum of circulation $\kappa$. For scales larger than $\ell$, a small polarisation of the vortex lines allows the stretching required to sustain a Kolmogorov energy cascade.

Experiments have been performed in superfluid helium II to create turbulence, that behave according to the Kolmogorov cascade. One such example of this is the case of two counter-rotating propellers, where both above and below the critical temperature $T_\text{c}$ a Kolmogorov energy spectrum was observed that is indistinguishable from those observed in the turbulence of classical fluids. For higher temperatures, the existence of the normal fluid component leads to the presence of viscous forces and eventual heat dissipation which warms the system. As a consequence of this friction the vortices become smoother, and the Kelvin waves that arise due to vortex reconnections are smoother than in low-temperature quantum turbulence. Kolmogorov turbulence arises in quantum fluids for energy input at large length scales, where the energy spectrum follows $k^{-5/3}$ in the inertial range $k_D < k < k_{\ell}$. For length scales smaller than $\ell$, instead the energy spectrum follows a $k^{-1}$ regime.

For temperatures in the zero limit, the undamped Kelvin waves result in more kinks appearing in the shapes of the vortices. For large length scales the quantum turbulence manifests as a Kolmogorov energy cascade (numerical simulations using the Gross-Pitaevskii equation and the vortex-filament model confirmed this effect), with the energy spectrum following $k^{-5/3}$. Lacking thermal dissipation, it is intuitive to assume that quantum turbulence in the low temperature limit does not decay as it would for higher temperatures, however experimental evidence showed that this was not the case: quantum turbulence decays even at very low temperatures. The Kelvin waves interact and create shorter Kelvin waves, until they are short enough that emission of sound (phonons), which results in the conversion of kinetic energy into heat, thus dissipation of energy. This process which shifts energy to smaller and smaller length scales at wavenumbers larger than $k_{\ell}$ is called the Kelvin wave cascade and proceeds on individual vortices. Low temperature quantum turbulence should thus consist of a double cascade: a Kolmogorov regime (a cascade of eddies) in the inertial range $k_D < k < k_{\ell}$, followed by a bottle-neck plateau, followed by the Kelvin wave cascade (a cascade of waves) that obeys the same $k^{-5/3}$ law but with different physical origin. This is at current consensus, but it must be stressed that it arises from theory and numerical simulations only: there is currently no direct experimental evidence for the Kelvin wave cascade due to the difficulty of observing and measuring at such small length scales.

=== Vinen turbulence ===
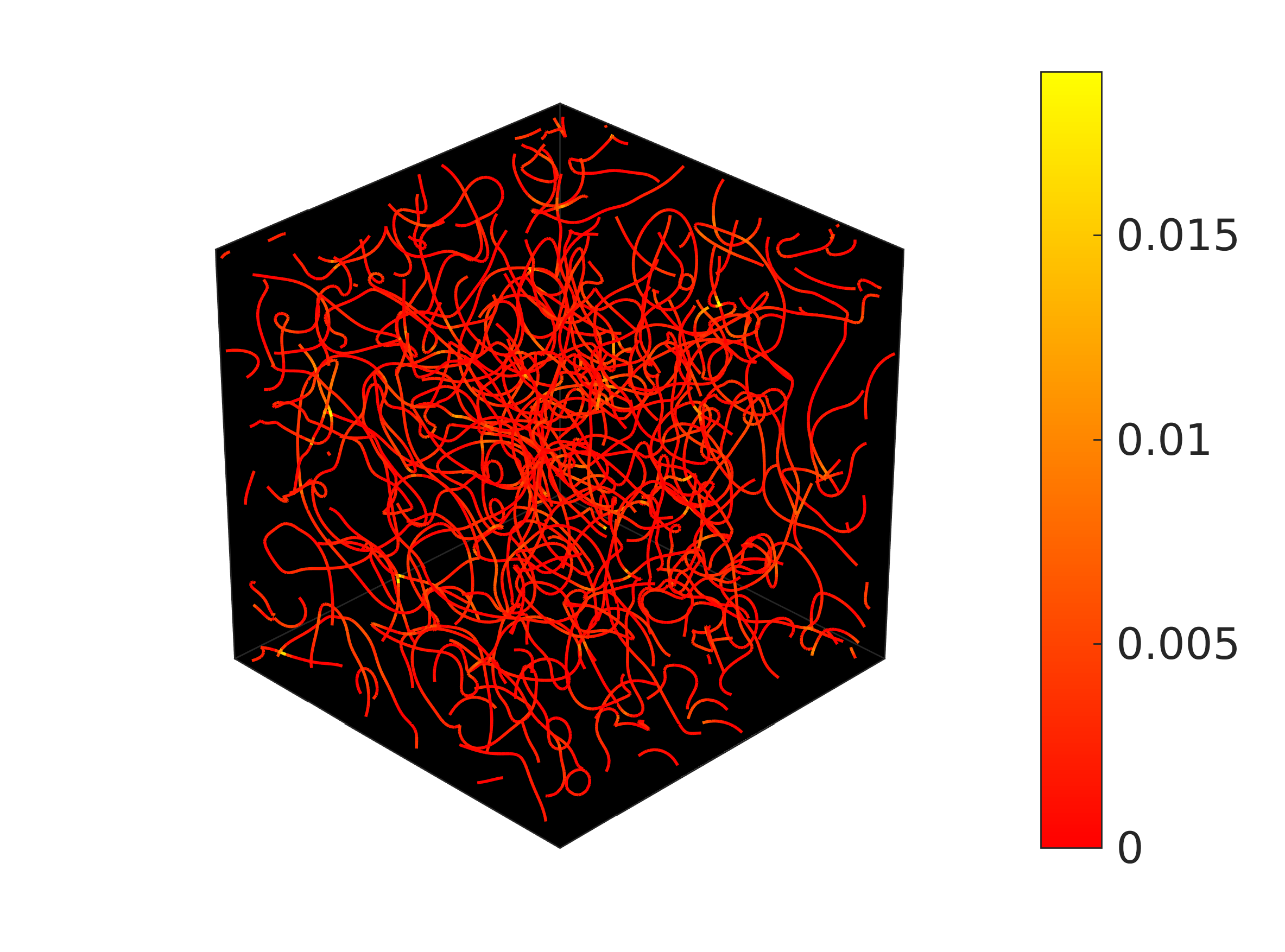
Fig 9b. Numerically simulated vortex tangle representing vinen quantum turbulence. The thin lines represent vortex lines inside of a cubic container. The colorbar represents the amount of non-local interaction, i.e. the amount by how much a section of the vortex line is affected by the other vortex lines surrounding it. (Credit AW Baggaley)

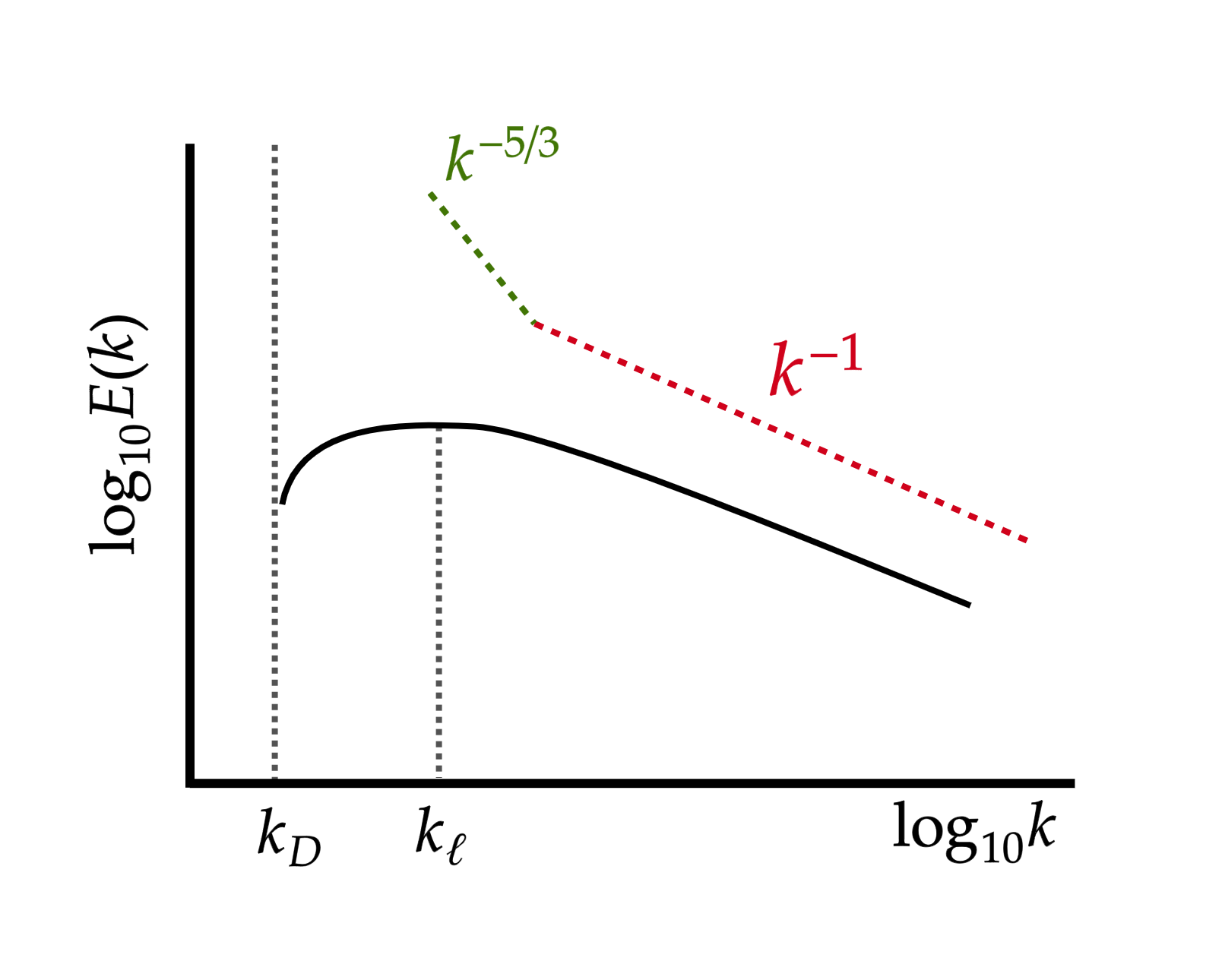
Fig 10. Schematic diagram of the energy spectrum for vinen turbulence. A $k^{-1}$ regime can be observed for very large wavenumbers, with the peak of the energy spectrum occurring at the wavenumber $k_{\ell}$ associated to the quantum length scale $\ell$. The green line represents a $k^{-5/3}$ regime for comparison.

Vinen turbulence can be generated in a quantum fluid by the injection of vortex rings into the system, which has been observed both numerically and experimentally. It has been observed also in numerical simulations of turbulent helium II driven by a small heat flux and in numerical simulations of trapped atomic Bose–Einstein condensates; it has been found even in numerical studies of superfluid models of the early universe. Unlike the Kolmogorov regime which appears to have a classical counterpart, Vinen turbulence has not been identified in classical turbulence.

Vinen turbulence occurs for very low energy inputs into the system, which prevents the formation of the large scale partially polarised structures that are prevalent in Kolmogorov turbulence, as is shown in Fig 9a. The partial polarization contributes strongly to the amount of non-local interactions between the vortex lines, which can be seen in the figure. In stark contrast, Fig 9b displays the Vinen turbulence regime, where there is very little non-local interaction. The energy spectrum of Vinen turbulence peaks at the intermediate scales around $k_{\ell}$, rather than at large length scales $k_{D}$. From Fig 10, it can be seen that for small length scales the turbulence follows the typical $k^{-1}$ behaviour of an isolated vortex. As a result of these properties Vinen turbulence appears as an almost completely random flow with a very weak or negligible energy cascade.

=== Decay of quantum turbulence ===
Stemming from the different signatures, Kolmogorov and Vinen turbulence follow power laws relating to their temporal decay. For the Kolmogorov regime, after removing the forcing which sustains the turbulence in a statistical steady-state, a decay of $E(t) \sim t^{-2}$ for the energy and $L(t) \sim t^{-3/2}$ for the vortex line density (defined as the vortex length per unit volume) are observed. Vinen turbulence decays temporally at a slower rate than Kolmogorov turbulence: the energy decays as $E(t) \sim t^{-1}$ and the vortex line density as $L(t) \sim t^{-1}$.

=== Turbulence in atomic condensates ===
Computer simulations have played a particularly important role in the development of the theoretical understanding of quantum turbulence

Turbulence in atomic condensates has only been studied very recently meaning that there is less information available. Turbulent atomic condensates contain a much smaller number of vortices compared to turbulence in helium. Because of the small size of typical atomic condensates, there is not a large length scale separation between the system size and the inter-vortex size, and therefore k-space is restricted. Numerical simulations suggest that turbulence is more likely to appear in the Vinen regime. Experiments performed in Cambridge have also found the emergence of wave turbulence scaling appearing.

== Generation and detection of quantum turbulence ==
=== Physical generation of quantum turbulence ===
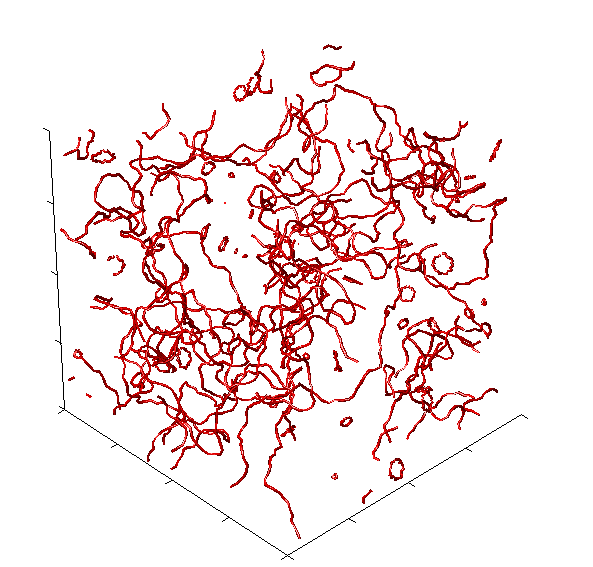
Fig 11. A simulated vortex tangle representing quantum turbulence in a cubic volume and showing the quantized vortices

There are a plethora of methods that can be used to generate a vortex tangle (visualised in fig 11) in the laboratory. Here they are listed by the quantum fluid that they can be generated in.

==== QT in helium II ====
- Suddenly towing a grid in the sample of fluid at rest
- Moving the fluid along pipes or channels using bellows or pumps, creating a superfluid wind tunnel (the TOUPIE experiment in Grenoble)
- Rotating one or two propellers inside a container; the configuration of two counter-rotating propellers is called the "von Karman flow" (e.g. the SHREK experiment in Grenoble)
- Creating shockwaves and cavitation by locally focusing ultrasound (this allows for the generation of quantum turbulence away from the boundaries)
- Oscillating/vibrating forks or wires
- Applying a heat flux (also termed the "thermal counterflow"): the prototype experiment is a channel which is open to a helium bath at one end and the opposite is closed and has a resistor. An electric current is passed through the resistor and generates ohmic heat; the heat is carried away from the heater towards the bath by the normal fluid component, while the superfluid moves towards the heater so that the net mass flux is zero as the channel is closed. A relative velocity $v_\text{ns} = |v_\text{n} - v_\text{s}|$ (counterflow) of the two fluid components is set up in this way which is proportional to the applied heat. Above a small critical value of the counterflow velocity, a turbulent vortex tangle is generated.
- Injecting vortex rings (rings are generated by injecting electrons which form a small bubble of about 16 angstroms in size that are accelerated by an electric field, until, upon exceeding the critical velocity, the vortex ring is nucleated)

==== QT in ^{3}He–B and atomic condensates ====
In ^{3}He–B, quantum turbulence can be generated by the vibration of wires. For atomic condensates, quantum turbulence can be generated by shaking or oscillating the trap which confines the BEC and by phase imprinting the quantum vortices.

=== Detection of quantum turbulence ===
In classical turbulence, one usually measures the velocity, either at a fixed position against time (typical of physical experiments) or at the same time at many positions (typical of numerical simulations). Quantum turbulence is characterised by a disordered tangle of discrete (individual) vortex lines.

In helium II techniques exists to measure the vortex line density $L$ (the length of vortex lines per unit volume based on detecting the second sound attenuation. The average distance between vortex lines, $\ell$, can be found in terms of the vortex line density as $\ell = 1/\sqrt{L}$ .

==== Detection in helium II ====
- Measuring the attenuation of second sound waves
- Measuring temperature or pressure gradients
- Measuring ions trapped in the vortices
- Using tracer particles (small glass or plastic spheres/solid hydrogen snowballs) of size of the order of a micron, and then imaging them using lasers. Techniques that can be used are PIV (particle image velocimetry) or PTV (particle tracking velocimetry). Most recently, excimer helium molecules have been used.
- Using oscillating forks
- Using cantilevers
- Using cryogenic hot wires

==== Detection in ^{3}He–B and atomic condensates ====
Quantum turbulence can be detected in ^{3}He–B in two ways: nuclear magnetic resonance (NMR) and by Andreev scattering of thermal quasiparticles. For atomic condensates, it is typical that the condensate must be expanded (by switching off the trapping potential) so that is sufficiently large for an image to be taken. This procedure has a disadvantage as it leads to the condensate being destroyed. The outcome leads to a 2-dimensional image which allows for the study of 2-dimensional quantum turbulence, but imposes a constraint studying 3-dimensional quantum turbulence using this method. Individual quantum vortices have been observed in 3-dimensions, moving and reconnecting using a technique which extracts small fractions of the condensate at a time, allowing for the observation of a time sequence of the same vortex configuration.

== See also ==
- Superfluid helium-4
- Macroscopic quantum phenomena
- Quantum vortex
- Quantum hydrodynamics
- 2D Quantum Turbulence
