= CHNC =

CHNC may refer to:

- CHNC-FM, a radio station (107.1 FM) licensed to New Carlisle, Quebec, Canada
- Classical-map hypernetted-chain method
