= Alexios Polychronakos =

Theoretical physicist

Alexios Polychronakos (born 1959, in Greece) is a theoretical physicist. He studied electrical engineering at the National Technical University of Athens (diploma in 1982) and did graduate work in theoretical physics at the California Institute of Technology (Ph.D. 1987) under the supervision of John Preskill.

Polychronakos is a professor of physics at the City College of New York. He is considered an authority on quantum field theory, quantum statistics, anyons, integrable systems, and quantum fluids, having authored over 110 refereed papers.

He is a Fellow of the American Physical Society (2012), cited for "For important contributions to the field of statistical mechanics and integrable systems, including the Polychronakos model and the exchange operator formalism, fractional statistics, matrix model description of quantum Hall systems as well as other areas such as noncommutative geometry".
