= Two-dimensional quantum turbulence =

Turbulent phenomena are observed universally in energetic fluid dynamics, associated with highly chaotic fluid motion, and typically involving excitations spreading over a wide range of length scales. The particular features of turbulence are dependent on the fluid and geometry, and specifics of forcing and dissipation.

In classical fluids the fluid vorticity is a continuous field able to acquire any value at each point in the fluid, associated with the fluid supporting any local value of fluid rotation. Quantum fluids are distinguished by vorticity that is quantised, a restriction imposed by the quantum wavefunction that describes the fluid when it reaches a superfluid state; the ability of a fluid to form quantum vortices is the most widely used experimental signature of superfluidity. While quantum fluids can also support classical turbulence, quantum turbulence involves the chaotic dynamics of many interacting quantum vortices. In highly excited bulk superfluid, many vortex lines interact with each other forming quantum turbulent states. When confined to move only in a plane, classical fluids exhibit a reversal in the direction of energy flow during turbulence. Instead of the three-dimensional process involving the formation of smaller rotating eddies, in two-dimensions small eddies tend to combine to make larger rotating structures.

By introducing tight confinement along one direction the Kelvin wave excitations involving bending of otherwise straight vortex lines can be strongly suppressed, favouring vortex alignment with the axis of tight confinement. Vortex dynamics can then enter a regime of effective 2D motion, equivalent to point vortices moving on a plane. In general, 2D quantum turbulence (2DQT) can exhibit complex phenomenology involving coupled vortices and sound in compressible superfluids. The quantum vortex dynamics can exhibit signatures of turbulence including a Kolmogorov −5/3 power law, a quantum manifestation of the inertial transport of energy to large scales observed in classical fluids, known as an inverse energy cascade.

== Point vortices ==
The point vortex model, introduced by Helmholtz and Kirchhoff, describes the motion of ideal point vortices confined to a plane, with direct mapping to planar electrodynamics. The model plays a central role in the study of planar Navier-Stokes flows, and can be realized in compressible superfluids such as those in ultracold gas Bose-Einstein condensates, when the healing length setting the vortex core size is very small compared to the system size.

== Negative temperature ==
Point vortices confined to finite area were predicted by Onsager to exhibit states of negative temperature. The possibility of negative absolute temperature originates with Onsager's analysis of the finite phase space of the point vortex system: in contrast to a massive particle moving on a plane, each point vortex only has two degrees of freedom, the spatial coordinates. Specifying the spatial coordinates of the vortex also completely determines the superfluid velocity. At leading order a quantum vortex is massless, with each filament moving with the net background flow and obeying a form of the Biot–Savart law. Guiding-centre plasmas exhibit a symmetry breaking transition at high energy per vortex associated with negative temperature. In Bose-Einstein condensates the annihilation of low-energy vortex dipoles can raise the energy per vortex until the system undergoes spontaneous ordering into macroscopic same-sign vortex clusters associated with negative temperature. Clustered equilibrium states have high energy per vortex, with clusters forming as a consequence of the limited phase space of confined point vortices.

== Forced turbulence ==
Vortices can be injected into a planar superfluid through various forcing mechanisms such as obstacle dragging or elliptical stirring that induce a localized breakdown of superfluidity, or through mechanisms that exploit abrupt phase evolution at the merging of multiple condensates or the condensate phase transition itself.

Small-scale forcing from appropriately dragging an obstacle can inject small vortex clusters into a planar superfluid. In strongly non-equilibrium quantum fluid dynamics, clustered states can develop as a result of steady inverse energy cascade from small scale forcing, leading to an accumulation of energy at the system scale in the form of macroscopic flow due to vortex charge ordering.

== Superfluid experiments ==
Advances in quantum fluids experiments have provided access to the point vortex regime in compressible superfluids. 2DQT regime has been established in ultracold gases, superfluid helium, and in exciton-polariton condensates comprising quantum fluids of light. Negative temperature states predicted by Onsager have recently been observed in systems with hard-wall boundary conditions.
