= Classical-map hypernetted-chain method =

The classical-map hypernetted-chain method (CHNC method) is a method used in many-body theoretical physics for interacting uniform electron liquids in two and three dimensions, and for non-ideal plasmas. The method extends the famous hypernetted-chain method (HNC) introduced by J.M.J. van Leeuwen et al. to quantum fluids as well. The classical HNC, together with the Percus–Yevick approximation, are the two pillars which bear the brunt of most calculations in the theory of interacting classical fluids. Also, HNC and PY have become important in providing basic reference schemes in the theory of fluids, and hence they are of great importance to the physics of many-particle systems.

The HNC and PY integral equations provide the pair distribution functions of the particles in a classical fluid, even for very high coupling strengths. The coupling strength is measured by the ratio of the potential energy to the kinetic energy. In a classical fluid, the kinetic energy is proportional to the temperature. In a quantum fluid, the situation is very complicated as one needs to deal with quantum operators, and matrix elements of such operators, which appear in various perturbation methods based on Feynman diagrams. The CHNC method provides an approximate "escape" from these difficulties, and applies to regimes beyond perturbation theory. In Robert B. Laughlin's famous Nobel Laureate work on the fractional quantum Hall effect, an HNC equation was used within a classical plasma analogy.

In the CHNC method, the pair-distributions of the interacting particles are calculated using a mapping which ensures that the quantum mechanically correct non-interacting pair distribution function is recovered when the Coulomb interactions are switched off. The value of the method lies in its ability to calculate the interacting pair distribution functions g(r) at zero and finite temperatures. Comparison of the calculated g(r) with results from Quantum Monte Carlo show remarkable agreement, even for very strongly correlated systems.

The interacting pair-distribution functions obtained from CHNC have been used to calculate the exchange-correlation energies, Landau parameters of Fermi liquids and other quantities of interest in many-body physics and density functional theory, as well as in the theory of hot plasmas.

== See also ==
- Fermi liquid
- Many-body theory
- Quantum fluid
- Radial distribution function
