= Quantum boomerang effect =

Quantum mechanical effect in disordered media

The quantum boomerang effect is a quantum mechanical phenomenon whereby wavepackets launched through disordered media return, on average, to their starting points, as a consequence of Anderson localization and the inherent symmetries of the system. At early times, the initial parity asymmetry of the nonzero momentum leads to asymmetric behavior: nonzero displacement of the wavepackets from their origin. At long times, inherent time-reversal symmetry and the confining effects of Anderson localization lead to correspondingly symmetric behavior: both zero final velocity and zero final displacement.

== History ==
In 1958, Philip W. Anderson introduced the eponymous model of disordered lattices which exhibits localization, the confinement of the electrons' probability distributions within some small volume. In other words, if a wavepacket were dropped into a disordered medium, it would spread out initially but then approach some maximum range. On the macroscopic scale, the transport properties of the lattice are reduced as a result of localization, turning what might have been a conductor into an insulator. Modern condensed matter models continue to study disorder as an important feature of real, imperfect materials.

In 2019, theorists considered the behavior of a wavepacket not merely dropped, but actively launched through a disordered medium with some initial nonzero momentum, predicting that the wavepacket's center of mass would asymptotically return to the origin at long times — the quantum boomerang effect. Shortly after, quantum simulation experiments in cold atom settings confirmed this prediction by simulating the quantum kicked rotor, a model that maps to the Anderson model of disordered lattices.

== Description ==
The center-of-mass trajectory of a quantum wavepacket in a disordered medium with some initial momentum. A classical wavepacket obeying the Boltzmann equation localizes at the terminus of its mean free path $\ell$, but a quantum wavepacket returns to and localizes at the origin. The infinite limit of the Padé approximant factor is approximated with $R_{[5/5]}$ for the purposes of this figure.

Consider a wavepacket $\Psi(x,t)\propto\exp\left[-x^2/(2\sigma)^2+ik_0x\right]$ with initial momentum $\hbar k_0$ which evolves in the general Hamiltonian of a Gaussian, uncorrelated, disordered medium:

$$\hat{H}=\frac{\hat{p}^2}{2m}+V(\hat{x}),$$

where $\overline{V(x)}=0$ and $\overline{V(x)V(x')}=\gamma\delta(x-x')$, and the overbar notation indicates an average over all possible realizations of the disorder.

The classical Boltzmann equation predicts that this wavepacket should slow down and localize at some new point — namely, the terminus of its mean free path. However, when accounting for the quantum mechanical effects of localization and time-reversal symmetry (or some other unitary or antiunitary symmetry), the probability density distribution $|\Psi^2|$ exhibits off-diagonal, oscillatory elements in its eigenbasis expansion that decay at long times, leaving behind only diagonal elements independent of the sign of the initial momentum. Since the direction of the launch does not matter at long times, the wavepacket must return to the origin.

The same destructive interference argument used to justify Anderson localization applies to the quantum boomerang. The Ehrenfest theorem states that the variance (i.e. the spread) of the wavepacket evolves thus:

$$\partial_t\langle\hat{x}^2\rangle=\frac{1}{2i\hbar m}\left\langle\left[\hat{x}^2,\hat{p}^2\right]\right\rangle=-\frac{1}{2m}\left(\hat{x}\hat{p}+\hat{p}\hat{x}\right)\approx 2v_0\langle\hat{x}\rangle_+-2v_0\langle\hat{x}\rangle_-,$$

where the use of the Wigner function allows the final approximation of the particle distribution into two populations $n_\pm$ of positive and negative velocities, with centers of mass denoted

$$\langle x\rangle_\pm\equiv\int\limits_{-\infty}^\infty x n_\pm(x,t)\mathrm{d}x.$$

A path contributing to $\langle\hat{x}\rangle_-$ at some time must have negative momentum $-\hbar k_0$ by definition; since every part of the wavepacket originated at the same positive momentum $\hbar k_0$ behavior, this path from the origin to $x$ and from initial $\hbar k_0$ momentum to final $-\hbar k_0$ momentum can be time-reversed and translated to create another path from $x$ back to the origin with the same initial and final momenta. This second, time-reversed path is equally weighted in the calculation of $n_-(x,t)$ and ultimately results in $\langle\hat{x}\rangle_-=0$. The same logic does not apply to $\langle\hat{x}\rangle_+$ because there is no initial population in the momentum state $-\hbar k_0$. Thus, the wavepacket variance only has the first term:

$$\partial_t\langle\hat{x}^2\rangle=2v_0\langle\hat{x}\rangle.$$

This yields long-time behavior

$$\langle\hat{x}(t)\rangle=64\ell\left(\frac{\tau}{t}\right)^2\log\left(1+\frac{t}{\tau}\right),$$

where $\ell$ and $\tau$ are the scattering mean free path and scattering mean free time, respectively. The exact form of the boomerang can be approximated using the diagonal Padé approximants $R_{[n/n]}$ extracted from a series expansion derived with the Berezinskii diagrammatic technique.
