= Yuri Klimontovich =

Soviet and Russian theoretical physicist

Yuri Lvovich Klimontovich (Russian: Юрий Львович Климонтович, 28 September 1924 — 26 October 2002) was a Soviet and Russian theoretical physicist who specialized in plasma physics, fluid dynamics, and statistical physics.

== Career ==
Klimontovich was born on 28 September 1924 in Moscow. His father was executed in 1931 as part of the political repression in the Soviet Union. Klimontovich graduated from Moscow State University in 1948, working with Vasily Fursov. He published the results in his first article. He then obtained his doctoral (cand. sci.) degree under the supervision of Nikolay Bogolyubov in 1951 at the same university. He was employed at Moscow State University from 1955. In 1962, he got the Doctor of Sciences degree at the Steklov Institute of Mathematics, and from 1964 until his death in 2002 he was a professor at Moscow State University.

In 1957, Klimontovich published a single-author article in which he derived the equation for the density of N classical particles in the phase space. This kinetic equation, which describes the time evolution of this density, for collisionless particless reduces to the Vlasov equation, but it also contains terms responsible for collisions between the particles. The equation, which is commonly used to describe plasma, is often referred to as the Klimontovich equation. In 1964 he published a book, Statistical theory of nonequilibrium processes, which describes theory of non-equilibrium plasma and is considered a standard text in plasma physics. Many of the results described in the book Klimontovich published in collaboration with Viktor Silin.

Later on, Klimontovich worked on introducing dissipation into kinetic equation. On one hand, he is credited with clarifying the role of dissipation in classical systems, on the other hand, he introduced his own approach which disagreed with the standard results in the field, in particular, the fluctuation–dissipation theorem, and was criticized by fellow researchers such as Vitaly Ginzburg and Lev Pitaevskii. He never agreed with the criticism. The issue is considered unsettled.

In the 1980s, Klimontovich worked on interaction of plasma, both classical and quantum, with electromagnetic radiation. The theory is based on kinetic equations which he developed earlier. One of the applications of this framework is the theoretical description of bremsstrahlung in plasma.

He got the State Prize of the Russian Federation in 1991 and the Sinelnikov Prize of the Ukrainian Academy of Sciences in 1990. Klimontovich received the honorary doctorate from University of Rostock in 1992.

Klimontovich is described as someone who was very punctual, never late for any appointments. During the discussions, his contribution was always brief but to the point.
