= Warm dense matter =

State of matter between hot plasma and cold condensed matter

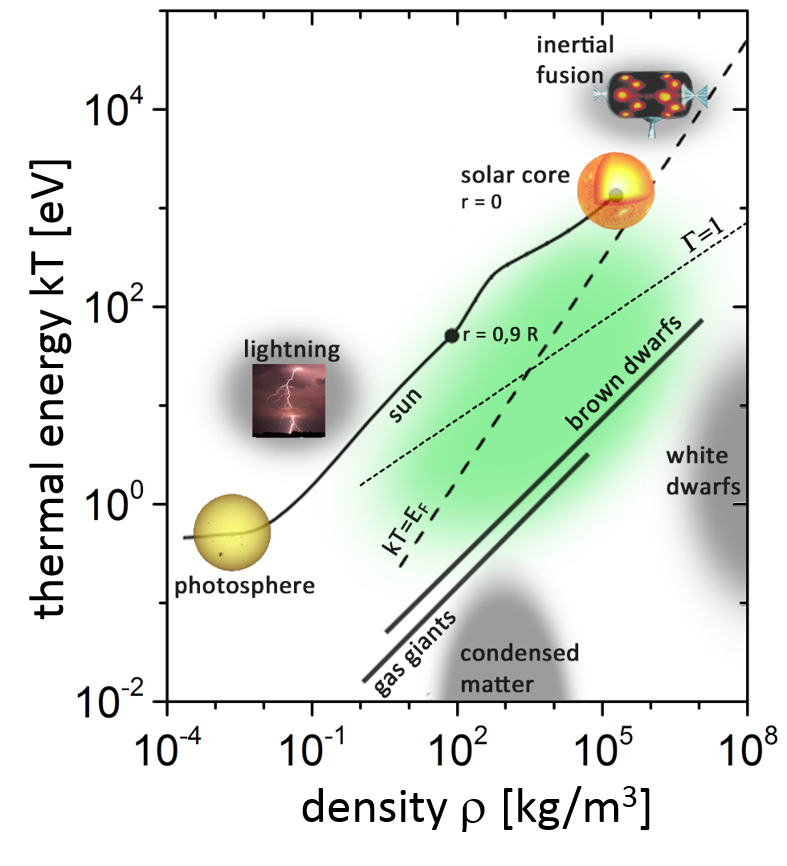
Thermal-energy–density phase diagram including the approximate location of warm dense matter (green area)

Warm dense matter, abbreviated WDM, can refer to either equilibrium or non-equilibrium states of matter in a (loosely defined) regime of temperature and density between condensed matter and hot plasma. It can be defined as the state that is too dense to be described by weakly coupled plasma physics yet too hot to be described by condensed matter physics. In this state, the potential energy of the Coulomb interaction between electrons and ions is on the same order of magnitude (or even significantly exceeds) their thermal energy, while the latter is comparable to the Fermi energy. Typically, WDM has a density somewhere between 0.01 and 100 g/cm^{3} and a temperature on the order of several thousand kelvins (somewhere between 1 and 100 eV, in the units favored by practitioners).

WDM is expected in the interiors of giant planets, brown dwarfs, and small stars. WDM is routinely formed in the course of intense-laser–target interactions (including the inertial confinement fusion research), particle-beam–target interactions, and in other setups where a condensed matter is quickly heated to become a strongly interacting plasma. As such, the WDM physics is also relevant to ablation of metals (atmospheric entry from space, laser-machining of materials, etc).

A WDM created using ultra-fast laser pulses may for a short time exist in a two-temperature non-equilibrium form where a small fraction of electrons are very hot, with the temperature well above that of the bulk matter.

== See also ==
- Liquid metals
