= Classical fluid =

Concept in physics

Classical fluids are systems of particles which retain a definite volume, and are at sufficiently high temperatures (compared to their Fermi energy) that quantum effects can be neglected. A system of hard spheres, interacting only by hard collisions (e.g., billiards, marbles), is a model classical fluid. Such a system is well described by the Percus–Yevik equation. Common liquids, e.g., liquid air, gasoline etc., are essentially mixtures of classical fluids. Electrolytes, molten salts, salts dissolved in water, are classical charged fluids. A classical fluid when cooled undergoes a freezing transition. On heating it undergoes an evaporation transition and becomes a classical gas that obeys Boltzmann statistics.

A system of charged classical particles moving in a uniform positive neutralizing background is known as a one-component plasma (OCP). This is well described by the hyper-netted chain equation (see classical-map hypernetted-chain method or CHNC). An essentially very accurate way of determining the properties of classical fluids is provided by the method of molecular dynamics. An electron gas confined in a metal is not a classical fluid, whereas a very high-temperature plasma of electrons could behave as a classical fluid. Such non-classical Fermi systems, i.e., quantum fluids, can be studied using quantum Monte Carlo methods, Feynman path integral formulation, and approximately via CHNC integral-equation methods.

== See also ==
- Bose–Einstein condensate
- Fermi liquid
- Many-body theory
- Quantum fluid
