= Quantum fluid =

System exhibiting quantum mechanical effects at the macroscopic level

A quantum fluid refers to any system that exhibits quantum mechanical effects at the macroscopic level: such as superfluids, superconductors, and ultracold atoms. Typically, quantum fluids occur in situations where both quantum mechanical effects and quantum statistical effects are significant.

Most matter is either solid or gaseous (at low densities) near absolute zero. However, for both isotopes of helium, helium-4 and helium-3, there is a pressure range within which they can remain liquid down to absolute zero, because the wavelengths of the quantum fluctuations within the helium atoms are larger than the inter-atomic distances.

In the case of solid quantum fluids, it is only a fraction of its electrons or protons that behave like a "fluid". One prominent example is superconductivity, where quasi-particles made up of pairs of electrons and a phonon act as bosons. As these are not subject to the Pauli exclusion principle, they can collapse into the ground state, and thus establish a supercurrent with a resistivity near zero.

== Derivation ==
Quantum mechanical effects become significant for physics in the range of the de Broglie wavelength. For condensed matter, this is when the de Broglie wavelength of a particle is greater than the spacing between the particles in the lattice that comprises the matter. The de Broglie wavelength associated with a massive particle is

$$\lambda = \frac{h}{p}$$

where h is the Planck constant. The momentum can be found from the kinetic theory of gases, where

$$p = mv_p = m\sqrt{2\frac{k_B T}{m}} = \sqrt{2 m k_B T}$$

Here, the temperature can be found as

$$k_BT = \frac{p^2}{2m}$$

Of course, we can replace the momentum here with the momentum derived from the de Broglie wavelength like so:

$$k_BT = \frac{h^2}{2m\lambda^2}$$

Hence, we can say that quantum fluids will manifest at approximate temperature regions where $\lambda > d$, where d is the lattice spacing (or inter-particle spacing). Mathematically, this is stated like so:

$$k_B T = \frac{h^2}{2m\lambda^2} < \frac{h^2}{2md^2}$$

It is easy to see how the above definition relates to the particle density, n. We can write

$$k_B T < \frac{h^2}{2m}n^{\frac{2}{3}}$$

as $n = \frac{1}{d^3}$ for a three dimensional lattice

The above temperature limit $T$ has different meaning depending on the quantum statistics followed by each system, but generally refers to the point at which the system manifests quantum fluid properties. For a system of fermions, $T$ is an estimation of the Fermi energy of the system, where processes important to phenomena such as superconductivity take place. For bosons, $T$ gives an estimation of the Bose-Einstein condensation temperature.

== See also ==
- Bose–Einstein condensate
- Superconductivity
- Superfluidity
- Classical fluid
- Liquid helium
- Fermi liquid
- Luttinger liquid
- Quantum spin liquid
- Macroscopic quantum phenomena
- Topological order
- Physics-informed neural networks
