= Michael M. May =

American theoretical physicist (1925–2026)

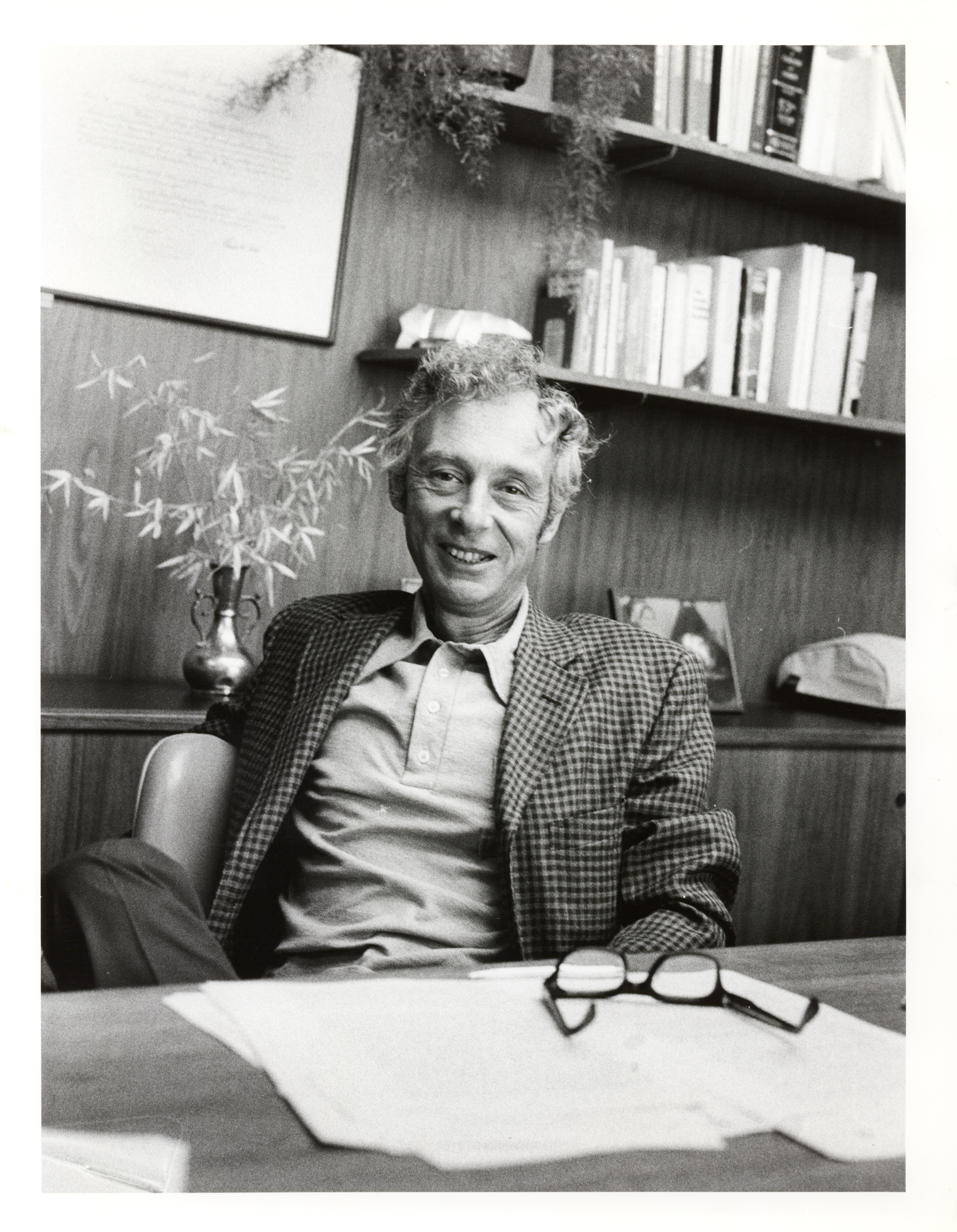
- May, 1977
- Born: Michel Meyer-May; December 23, 1925; Marseille, France
- Died: May 17, 2026 (aged 100); San Francisco, California, U.S.
- Citizenship: United States
- Education: Whitman College (B.S., 1944); University of California, Berkeley (Ph.D., 1952)
- Employers: Lawrence Livermore National Laboratory; Stanford University
- Known for: Director of Lawrence Livermore National Laboratory
- Awards: Ernest Orlando Lawrence Award (1970); Distinguished Civilian Service Medal (1975); Distinguished Public Service Medal (1979)

Michael Melville May (born Michel Meyer-May; December 23, 1925 – May 17, 2026) was a French-born American theoretical physicist, nuclear weapons designer and arms control expert. He served as the fifth director of Lawrence Livermore National Laboratory (LLNL) from 1965 to 1971, and later as co-director of the Center for International Security and Cooperation (CISAC) at Stanford University. Over a career spanning more than half a century, May shaped U.S. nuclear deterrence strategy and arms control policy, contributing to thermonuclear weapons design, the development of supercomputing at LLNL, and high-level negotiations including the Strategic Arms Limitation Talks (SALT).

== Early life and education ==
Michel Meyer-May was born in Marseille, France, on December 23, 1925, to Juliette Trarieux May and Jacques Meyer-May. His mother was a granddaughter of Ludovic Trarieux, a French senator and human-rights pioneer. His father was a physician and medical geographer whose work in tropical medicine took the family across continents, including several years in French Indochina (present-day Vietnam), where Jacques May trained Vietnamese doctors and was a founder of the Bạch Mai Hospital.

He spent much of his childhood in Paris, where he thrived in the French academic system despite losing more than a year to complications from polio. At age 12, he and his family relocated to Hanoi. In 1940, as World War II engulfed Europe, his mother emigrated with May and his siblings to Walla Walla, Washington. He was 14 years old. He graduated from high school at age 15. May retained traces of a French accent in his English speech throughout his life.

May went on to earn degrees in mathematics and physics from Whitman College in 1944, at the age of 18. He became a U.S. citizen in 1944.

Following his undergraduate studies, May was drafted into the U.S. Army and served from 1944 to 1946. He chose to train as a paratrooper and participated in weapons testing during his service.

After his discharge, May pursued graduate study, first at the University of Washington and later at the University of California, Berkeley, where he completed a Ph.D. in physics in 1952. His dissertation, titled A Study of the Properties of V⁰-Particles, examined particles produced by cosmic rays—particles now known as kaons. His time at Berkeley coincided with the anti-communist Loyalty Oath controversy, which led several of his faculty mentors to leave the university.

== Career at Lawrence Livermore National Laboratory ==
=== Early work (1952–1962) ===
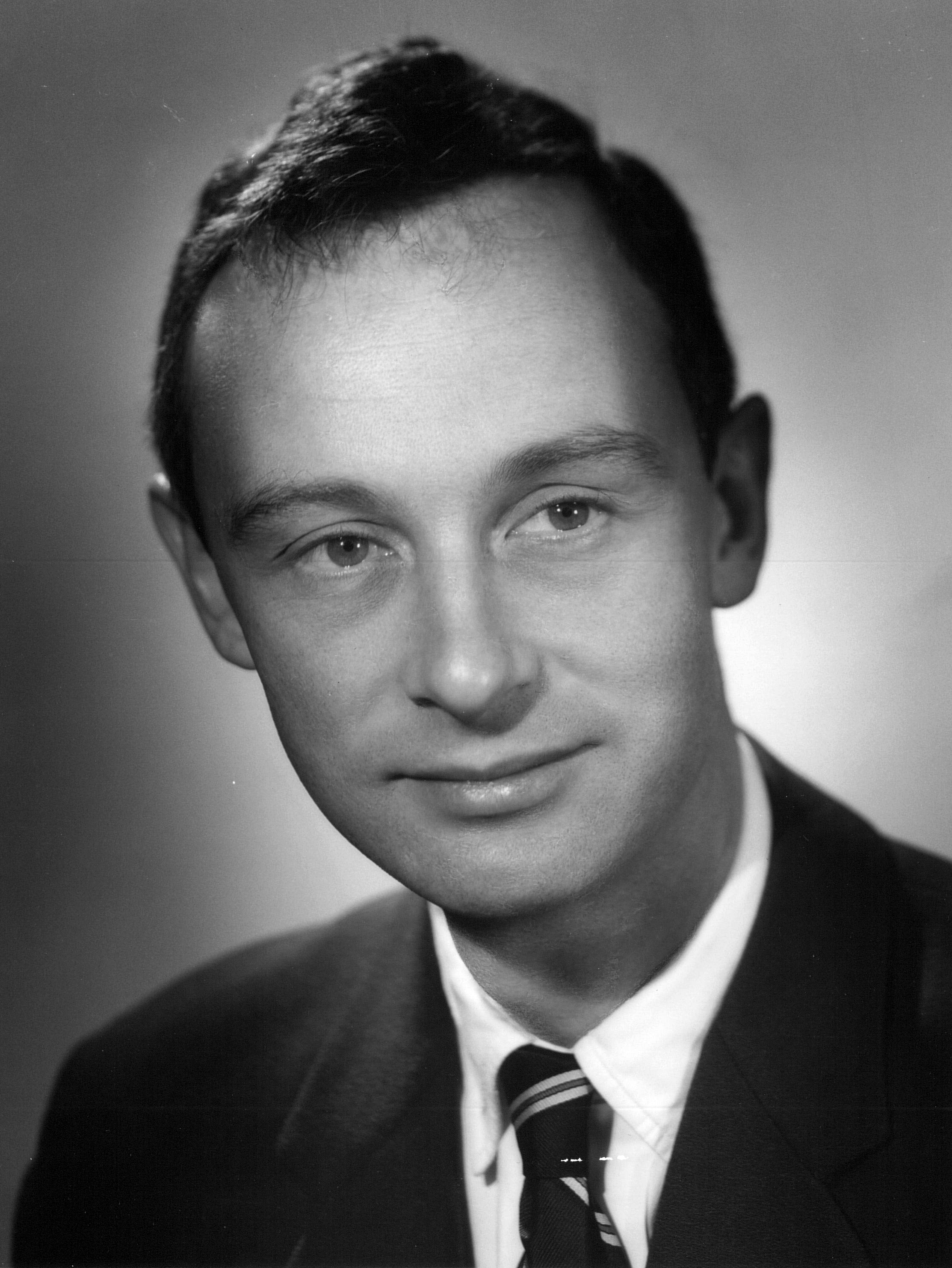
May, 1963.

In 1952, May accepted an invitation from physicist Herbert York to join the newly established UC Radiation Laboratory in Livermore (later renamed Lawrence Livermore National Laboratory). May later recalled that he did not learn the Laboratory was focused on nuclear weapons development until his first day on the job.

May joined LLNL's Theoretical Physics Division, where he focused on theoretical calculations for thermonuclear weapons. He became a group leader and later alternate division head. He was among the first scientists at the Laboratory to explore the use of high-speed computing to advance physics modeling, contributions that strengthened LLNL's reputation as a technically innovative institution. By 1962, he had been appointed Associate Director for Nuclear Design.

=== Director of LLNL (1965–1971) ===
On October 22, 1965, the University of California Board of Regents appointed May director of Lawrence Livermore National Laboratory, succeeding John S. Foster Jr. At the time, the Laboratory employed over 5,600 people.

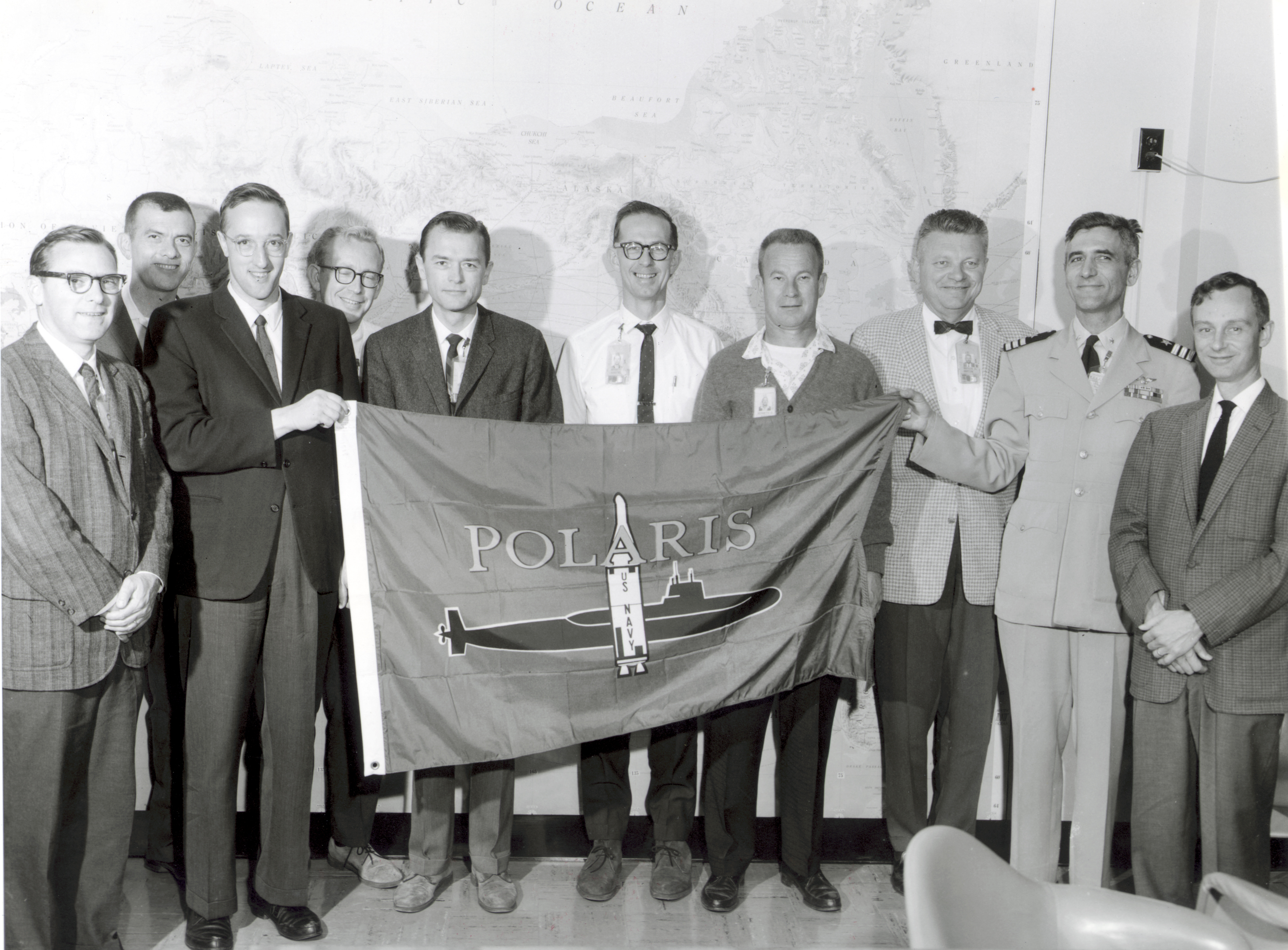
May (far right) with members of the Polaris team, commemorating completion of the missile project.

During his directorship, the Laboratory developed warheads for the Poseidon, Minuteman, and Spartan missile systems. May oversaw the acquisition of the Laboratory's first CDC 7600 supercomputers, expanded magnetic fusion research (including the Baseball II superconducting magnet experiment), and supported Operation Plowshare, a program investigating peaceful applications of underground nuclear explosions. In 1971, just before stepping down, May initiated the consolidation of the Laboratory's various laser research projects, laying the foundation for what would become LLNL's world-leading laser program; the laser program budget grew from $2 million in 1970 to more than $95 million by 1982.

May also helped establish the UC Davis Department of Applied Science at Livermore in the early 1960s and was an early advocate for internally funded research, helping set the stage for the Laboratory's Institutional Research and Development (IR&D) program.

=== Arms control and policy work (1971–1988) ===
After stepping down as director in 1971, May spent a year as a visiting fellow at what is now the Princeton School of Public and International Affairs. He then returned to LLNL as its first Associate Director at Large, a position he held until his retirement in 1988.

During this period, May increasingly focused on national security and arms control. In 1974, he served as technical adviser to the U.S. delegation for the Threshold Test Ban Treaty negotiations in Moscow. From 1974 to 1976, he was a U.S. delegate to the Strategic Arms Limitation Talks (SALT II) in Geneva. He also advised Secretaries of Defense James Schlesinger, Harold Brown, and Caspar Weinberger on missile defense, strategic nuclear balance, and basing options for the MX missile.

May was a long-standing member of the Defense Science Board and served on the National Academy of Sciences' Committee on International Security and Arms Control, making multiple visits to the Soviet Union and China to engage in expert-level dialogue on nuclear risk reduction. Within LLNL, he led the Laboratory's Long-Range Planning Committee in the early 1980s to identify promising new areas of research. He also served on the board of the RAND Corporation and helped found the Valley Study Group to strengthen relations between LLNL and the surrounding community.

== Stanford University (1988–c. 2014) ==
After retiring from LLNL in 1988, May joined Stanford University as a Professor of Research in the School of Engineering and a Senior Fellow at the Freeman Spogli Institute for International Studies. He co-directed the Center for International Security and Cooperation (CISAC) from 1993 to 2000.

At Stanford, May led research on nuclear posture, nonproliferation, terrorism, and the role of civilian nuclear energy in national security. In 2007, he co-hosted a workshop on response planning for a terrorist nuclear detonation in a U.S. city; the resulting report, The Day After, became a reference document for national emergency preparedness planning. He chaired a technical working group on nuclear forensics, led workshops on the Nuclear Non-Proliferation Treaty, and co-authored studies on emerging trends in nuclear energy. He also taught courses at UC San Diego, Stanford, and other institutions.

Into his 90s, May remained an engaged voice in science and policy discussions.

== Personal life and death ==
May married Mary Elizabeth Cottrell of Aberdeen, Washington, on July 6, 1952, in Grayland, Washington. They had four children. The family lived primarily in Pleasanton, California, with periods in Los Angeles, California, Princeton, New Jersey, and Geneva, Switzerland. Mary May died in 2007 after 55 years of marriage. Later in life, May enjoyed the companionship of Stanford Professor Gail Lapidus.

He practiced both Christianity and Zen Buddhism.

May died on May 17, 2026, at the age of 100.

== Legacy ==
In 2016, LLNL celebrated May's 90th birthday with a symposium hosted by the Center for Global Security Research, where former directors and colleagues gathered to reflect on his contributions. Brad Roberts, director of the Center for Global Security Research, summarized May's impact: "He saw the world clearly. He spoke compellingly about what mattered and put ideas into play that we still debate today."

An oral history, Michael M. May: A Career in Physics, Nuclear Weapons Design, and Arms Control, conducted by Roger Eardley-Pryor of the UC Berkeley Bancroft Library, is publicly available.

== Awards and recognition ==
Year	Award
1970	Ernest Orlando Lawrence Award, Atomic Energy Commission
1975	Distinguished Civilian Service Medal, U.S. Department of Defense
1976	Honorary degree, Whitman College
1979	Distinguished Public Service Medal, U.S. Department of Defense
1995	Fellow, American Physical Society
2002	Presidential Medal, University of California
2014	Joseph A. Burton Forum Award, American Physical Society
2019	Alumni of Merit Award, Whitman College

May was also a Fellow of the American Association for the Advancement of Science and a member of the Council on Foreign Relations, the Pacific Council on International Policy, and the International Institute for Strategic Studies.
