= Sheldon Wolff =

American radiobiologist and cytogeneticist

Sheldon Wolff (September 22, 1928, Peabody, Massachusetts – May 24, 2008, Mill Valley, California) was an American radiobiologist, cytogeneticist, and environmental health expert on mutagenic chemicals.

== Biography ==
He graduated from Tufts College with a B.S. in 1950 and from Harvard University with an M.A. in 1951 and with a Ph.D. in 1953. His doctoral dissertation "Some aspects of the chemical protection against radiation damage to Vicia faba chromosomes" was supervised by Karl Sax. From 1953 to 1966 Wolff worked in the biology division of Oak Ridge National Laboratory (ORNL), where he studied radiation-induced cell damage. At the University of California, San Francisco (UCSF) he was a professor of cytogenetics and radiology from 1966 to 1996, when he retired as professor emeritus. As the successor to Harvey M. Patt, Wolff was from 1982 to 1996 the director of UCSF's Laboratory of Radiobiology and Environmental Health (LREH). During his tenure at UCSF he chaired for nine years the U.S. Department of Energy's Health and Environmental Research Advisory Committee (HERAC). From 1996 to 2000 he worked at a scientific laboratory in Hiroshima, Japan as vice chairman and chief of research of the Radiation Effects Research Foundation.

Dr. Wolff was widely honored for his discovery that the body's genetic machinery possessed natural mechanisms for repairing cell damage caused by exposure to extremely low levels of radiation. Those "repaired" cells, he found, then showed less damage after exposure to higher levels of radiation, and also to chemicals that ordinarily cause genetic mutations.

He received the 1973 Ernest Orlando Lawrence Award for "research leading to the classic observation that chromosomal damage is subject to metabolic repair processes, and thus laying the foundation for study of genetic repair mechanisms. His incisive cytogentic investigations of dose-effect relationships, dose fractionation, and other modifying."

He also won the 1982 Environmental Mutagen Society Award and the 1992 Failla Lectureship and Gold Medal from the Radiation Research Society, of which he had been president. In 1998, he and the organization he served in Hiroshima received the first Leonard Sagan "BELLE" award for their work studying the biological effects of low-level exposure to radiation. Dr. Sagan, another noted San Francisco expert in the field, had died the year before.

Upon his death Wolff was survived by his widow, two sons, a daughter, and three grandchildren.

== Selected publications ==
- Abrahamson, Seymour; Bender, Michael A.; Conger, Alan D.; Wolff, Sheldon (1973). "Uniformity of Radiation-induced Mutation Rates among Different Species". Nature. 245 (5426): 460–462. Bibcode:1973Natur.245..460A. doi:10.1038/245460a0. PMID 4270703. S2CID 4289586.
- Perry, Paul; Wolff, Sheldon (1974). "New Giemsa method for the differential staining of sister chromatids". Nature. 251 (5471): 156–158. Bibcode:1974Natur.251..156P. doi:10.1038/251156a0. PMID 4138930. S2CID 4160556.
- Wolff, Sheldon; Rodin, B.; Cleaver, J. E. (1977). "Sister chromatid exchanges induced by mutagenic carcinogens in normal and xeroderma pigmentosum cells". Nature. 265 (5592): 347–349. Bibcode:1977Natur.265..347W. doi:10.1038/265347a0. PMID 834283. S2CID 4196980.
- Morimoto, Kanehisa; Wolff, S. (April 1980). "Increase of Sister Chromatid Exchanges and Perturbations of Cell Division Kinetics in Human Lymphocytes by Benzene Metabolites1". Cancer Research. 40 (4): 1189–1193. PMID 7357548.
- Latt, Samuel A.; Allen, James; Bloom, Stephen E.; Carrano, Anthony; Falke, Ernest; Kram, David; Schneider, Edward; Schreck, Rhona; Tice, Raymond; Whitfield, Brad; Wolff, Sheldon (1981). "Sister-chromatid exchanges: A report of the GENE-TOX program". Mutation Research/Reviews in Genetic Toxicology. 87 (1): 17–62. doi:10.1016/0165-1110(81)90003-8. PMID 6173747.
- Wolff, Sheldon; Afzal, Veena; Wiencke, J.K.; Olivieri, Gregorio; Michaeli, A. (1988). "Human Lymphocytes Exposed to Low Doses of Ionizing Radiations Become Refractory to High Doses of Radiation as Well as to Chemical Mutagens that Induce Double-strand Breaks in DNA". International Journal of Radiation Biology. 53 (1): 39–48. doi:10.1080/09553008814550401. PMID 3257477.
- Wolff, Sheldon (1989). "Are Radiation-Induced Effects Hormetic?". Science. 245 (4918): 575. Bibcode:1989Sci...245..575W. doi:10.1126/science.2762808. PMID 2762808.
- Youngblom, Janey H.; Wiencke, John K.; Wolff, Sheldon (1989). "Inhibition of the adaptive response of human lymphocytes to very low doses of ionizing radiation by the protein synthesis inhibitor cycloheximide". Mutation Research Letters. 227 (4): 257–261. doi:10.1016/0165-7992(89)90107-3. PMID 2586550.
- Wolff, Sheldon; Jostes, Rick; Cross, Frederick T.; Hui, T.Edmund; Afzal, Veena; Wiencke, John K. (1991). "Adaptive response of human lymphocytes for the repair of radon-induced chromosomal damage". Mutation Research/Fundamental and Molecular Mechanisms of Mutagenesis. 250 (1–2): 299–306. Bibcode:1991MRFMM.250..299W. doi:10.1016/0027-5107(91)90185-Q. PMID 1944344.
- Wolff, Sheldon (1992). "Is Radiation All Bad? The Search for Adaptation". Radiation Research. 131 (2): 117–123. Bibcode:1992RadR..131..117W. doi:10.2307/3578431. JSTOR 3578431.
- Wolff, S.; Afzal, V.; Jostes, R. F.; Wiencke, J. K. (1993). "Indications of repair of radon-induced chromosome damage in human lymphocytes: An adaptive response induced by low doses of X-rays". Environmental Health Perspectives. 101 (Suppl 3): 73–77. Bibcode:1993EnvHP.101S..73W. doi:10.1289/ehp.93101s373. PMC 1521171. PMID 8143650. 1993
- Wolff, S. (1998). "The adaptive response in radiobiology: Evolving insights and implications". Environmental Health Perspectives. 106 (Suppl 1): 277–283. Bibcode:1998EnvHP.106S.277W. doi:10.1289/ehp.98106s1277. PMC 1533272. PMID 9539019.
