= Ernest Orlando Lawrence Award =

American scientific award

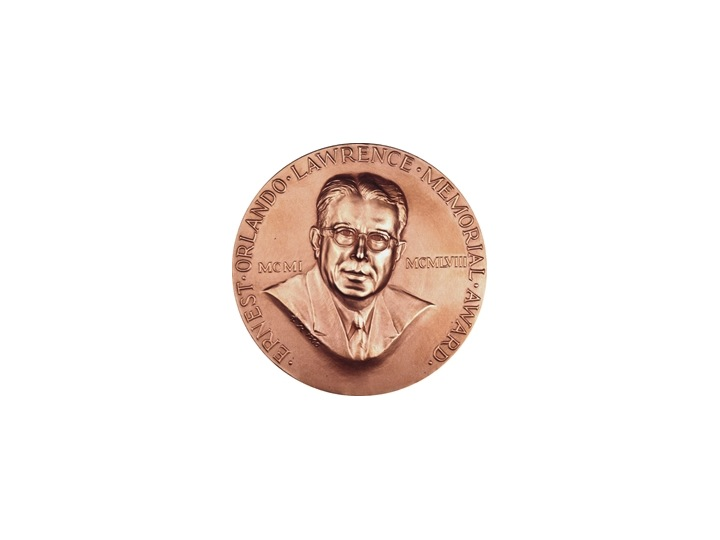
- Ernest Orlando Lawrence Medal
- Awarded for: Excellence in scientific, technical, or engineering achievements related to the missions of the U.S. Department of Energy
- Sponsored by: Department of Energy's Office of Science
- Country: United States
- Presented by: Secretary of the U.S. Department of Energy
- Reward: $20,000
- First award: 1960
- Website: https://science.osti.gov/lawrence

The Ernest Orlando Lawrence Award was established in 1959 in honor of Ernest Lawrence, a scientist who helped elevate American physics to the status of world leader in the field.

Lawrence was the inventor of the cyclotron, an accelerator of subatomic particles, and a 1939 Nobel Laureate in physics for that achievement. The Radiation Laboratory he developed at Berkeley during the 1930s ushered in the era of "big science", in which experiments were no longer done by an individual researcher and a few assistants on the table-top of an academic lab but by large, multidisciplinary teams of scientists and engineers in entire buildings full of sophisticated equipment and huge scientific machines. During World War II, Lawrence and his accelerators contributed to the Manhattan Project, and he later played a leading role in establishing the U.S. system of national laboratories, two of which (Lawrence Berkeley and Lawrence Livermore) now bear his name.

Shortly after Lawrence's death in August 1958, John A. McCone, Chairman of the United States Atomic Energy Commission, wrote to President Eisenhower suggesting the establishment of a memorial award in Lawrence's name. President Eisenhower agreed, saying, "Such an award would seem to me to be most fitting, both as a recognition of what he has given to our country and to mankind, and as a means of helping to carry forward his work through inspiring others to dedicate their lives and talents to scientific effort." The first Lawrence Awards were given in 1960.

The Ernest Orlando Lawrence Award is bestowed by the Secretary of the U.S. Department of Energy to mid-career scientists and engineers in recognition of exceptional scientific, technical, and/or engineering achievements related to the broad missions of the U.S. Department of Energy and its programs. The Lawrence Award is administered by the Department of Energy's Office of Science.

Each Lawrence Award recipient receives a citation signed by the Secretary of Energy, a gold medal bearing the likeness of Ernest Orlando Lawrence, and a $20,000 honorarium.

== Nomination and selection procedures ==
The Ernest Orlando Lawrence Awards honor scientists and engineers, at mid-career, showing promise for the future, for exceptional contributions in research and development supporting the U.S. Department of Energy and its mission to advance the national economic and energy security of the United States.

Beginning in 2011, the awards are given annually. One Lawrence Award is given in each of the following eight fields:

- Atomic, Molecular, and Chemical Sciences
- Biological and Environmental Sciences
- Computer, Information, and Knowledge Sciences
- Condensed Matter and Materials Sciences
- Energy Science and Innovation
- Fusion and Plasma Sciences
- High Energy and Nuclear Physics
- National Security and Nonproliferation

The objectives of the Ernest Orlando Lawrence Awards are:

- to encourage excellence in energy science and technology;
- to inspire people to dedicate their lives and talents to scientific and technological effort, through the examples of Ernest O. Lawrence and the Lawrence Award laureates; and
- to highlight for the general public the accomplishments of the U.S. scientific and technological communities associated with the U.S. Department of Energy.

=== Criteria ===
Eligibility for the Lawrence Award requires that all recipients:

- be in the middle of their careers, defined as within 20 years of earning their highest degree*;
- be citizens of the United States;
- be recognized for achievement in research principally funded by the U.S. Department of Energy; and
- be assessed primarily on the scientific impact and technical significance of their work relative to its discipline and/or related mission. (Business management and stewardship acumen, while valued, is not a significant qualification factor used when evaluating a nominee's worthiness.)

=== Nomination materials ===
Nomination is made by a letter of justification, curriculum vitae, a statement explaining the nominee's connection to DOE support, a no more than 35 word citation, a bibliography of significant publications, and identifying the award category of the nominee (Atomic, Molecular, and Chemical Sciences; Biological and Environmental Sciences; Computer, Information, and Knowledge Sciences; Condensed Matter and Materials Sciences; Energy Science and Innovation; Fusion and Plasma Sciences; High Energy and Nuclear Physics; or National Security and Nonproliferation). An individual's nomination is limited to a single category.

=== Selection ===
The nomination materials for all eligible nominees are objectively studied by independent peer review panels, one for each of eight award categories, and if worthy candidate(s) are identified in the peer review, selection recommendations based upon these findings are made by Federal Program Officials. A concurrence request for any awardees is made to the Secretary of Energy, who holds final discretion over any selection(s).

The reviewers are not empanelled as a Federal Advisory Committee. The identity of all nominators, all nominees, and all peer review panelists remain anonymous. DOE employees must comply with regulations governing conduct of employees codified in 10 CFR Part 1010 and Standards of Ethical Conduct for Employees of the Executive Branch at 5 CFR §2635.

== Award laureates ==
The following people have won the award:

1960

- Hendrik Wade Bode
- Harvey Brooks
- John S. Foster Jr.
- Isadore Perlman
- Norman F. Ramsey Jr.
- Alvin M. Weinberg

1961

- Leo Brewer
- Henry Hurwitz Jr.
- Conrad L. Longmire
- Wolfgang K. H. Panofsky
- Kenneth E. Wilzbach

1962

- Andrew A. Benson
- Richard Feynman
- Herbert Goldstein
- Anthony L. Turkevich
- Herbert F. York

1963

- Herbert J.C. Kouts
- L. James Rainwater
- Louis Rosen
- James M. Taub
- Cornelius A. Tobias

1964

- Jacob Bigeleisen
- Albert L. Latter
- Harvey M. Patt
- Marshall N. Rosenbuth
- Theos J. Thompson

1965

- George A. Cowan
- Floyd L. Culler
- Milton C. Edlund
- Theodore B. Taylor
- Arthur C. Upton

1966

- Harold M. Agnew
- Ernest C. Anderson
- Murray Gell-Mann
- John R. Huizenga
- Paul R. Vanstrum

1967

- Mortimer M. Elkind
- John M. Googin
- Allen F. Henry
- John O. Rasmussen
- Robert N. Thorn

1968

- James R. Arnold
- E. Richard Cohen
- Val L. Fitch
- Richard Latter
- John B. Storer

1969

- Geoffrey F. Chew
- Don T. Cromer
- Ely M. Gelbard
- F. Newton Hayes
- John H. Nuckolls

1970

- William J. Bair
- James W. Cobble
- Joseph M. Hendrie
- Michael M. May
- Andrew M. Sessler

1971

- Thomas B. Cook
- Robert L. Fleischer
- Robert L. Hellens
- P. Buford Price
- Robert M. Walker

1972

- Charles C. Cremer
- Sidney D. Drell
- Marvin Goldman
- David A. Shirley
- Paul F. Zweifel

1973

- Louis Baker
- Seymour Sack
- Thomas E. Wainwright
- James Robert Weir
- Sheldon Wolff

1974

- Joseph Cerny
- Harold Paul Furth
- Henry C. Honeck
- Charles A. McDonald
- Chester R.Richmond

1975

- Evan H. Appelman
- Charles E. Elderkin
- William A. Lokke
- Burton Richter
- Samuel C. C. Ting

1976

- A. Philip Bray
- James W. Cronin
- Kaye D. Lathrop
- Adolphus L. Lotts
- Edwin D. McClanahan

1977

- James D. Bjorken
- John L. Emmett
- F. William Studier
- Gareth Thomas
- Dean A. Waters

1980

- Donald W. Barr
- B. Grant Logan
- Nicholas P. Samios
- Benno P. Schoenborn
- Charles D. Scott

1981

- Martin Blume
- Yuan Tseh Lee
- Fred R. Mynatt
- Paul B. Selby
- Lowell L. Wood

1982

- George F. Chapline, Jr.
- Mitchell J. Feigenbaum
- Michael J. Lineberry
- Nicholas Turro
- Raymond E. Wildung

1983

- James Frederick Jackson
- Michael E. Phelps
- Paul H. Rutherford
- Mark S. Wrighton
- George B. Zimmerman

1984

- Robert W. Conn
- John J. Dunn
- Peter L. Hagelstein
- Siegfried S. Hecker
- Robert B. Laughlin
- Kenneth N. Raymond

1985

- Anthony P. Malinauskas
- William H. Miller
- David R. Nygren
- Gordon C. Osbourn
- Betsy Sutherland
- Thomas A. Weaver

1986

- James J. Duderstadt
- Helen T. Edwards
- Joe W. Gray
- C. Bradley Moore
- Gustavus J. Simmons
- James L. Smith

1987

- James W. Gordon
- Miklos Gyulassy
- Sung-Hou Kim
- James L. Kinsey
- J. Robert Merriman
- David E. Moncton

1988

- Mary K. Gaillard
- Richard T. Lahey, Jr.
- Chain Tsuan Liu
- Gene H. McCall
- Alexander Pines
- Joseph S. Wall

1990

- John J. Dorning
- James R. Norris
- S. Thomas Picraux
- Wayne J. Shotts
- Maury Tigner
- F. Ward Whicker

1991

- Zachary Fisk
- Richard Fortner
- Rulon Linford
- Peter Schultz
- Richard E. Smalley
- J. Pace Vandevender

1993

- James G. Anderson
- Robert G. Bergman
- Alan R. Bishop
- Yoon I. Chang
- Robert K. Moyzis
- John W. Shaner
- Carl Wieman

1994

- John D. Boice, Jr.
- E. Michael Campbell
- Gregory J. Kubas
- Edward William Larsen
- John D. Lindl
- Gerard M. Ludtka
- George F. Smoot
- John E. Till

1996

- Charles R. Alcock
- Mina J. Bissell
- Thom H. Dunning, Jr.
- Charles V. Jakowatz, Jr.
- Sunil K. Sinha
- Theofanis G. Theofanous
- Jorge Luis Valdes

1998

- Dan Gabriel Cacuci
- Joanna S. Fowler
- Laura H. Greene
- Neil P. Kelly
- Steven E. Koonin
- Mark H. Thiemens
- Ahmed H. Zewail

2002

- C. Jeffrey Brinker
- Claire M. Fraser
- Bruce T. Goodwin
- Keith O. Hodgson
- Saul Perlmutter
- Benjamin D. Santer
- Paul J. Turinsky

2004

- Richard B. Elkind
- Nathaniel J. Fisch
- Bette Korber
- Claire Ellen Max
- Fred N. Mortensen
- Richard J. Saykally
- Ivan K. Schuller
- Gregory W. Swift

2006

- Paul Alivisatos and Moungi Bawendi, Materials Research
- Malcolm J. Andrews, National Security
- Arup K. Chakraborty, Life Sciences
- My Hang V. Huynh, Chemistry
- Marc Kamionkowski, Physics
- John Zachara, Environmental Science and Technology
- Steven Zinkle, Nuclear Technology

2009

- Joan F. Brennecke
- William Dorland
- Omar Hurricane
- Wim Leemans
- Zhi-Xun Shen
- Sunney Xie

2011

- Riccardo Betti
- Paul C. Canfield
- Mark B. Chadwick
- David E. Chavez
- Amit Goyal
- Thomas P. Guilderson
- Lois Curfman McInnes
- Bernard Matthew Poelker
- Barry F. Smith

2013

- Adam P. Arkin
- Siegfried H. Glenzer
- Stephen C. Myers
- John L. Sarrao
- John C. Wagner
- Margaret S. Wooldridge

2014

- Mei Bai
- Carolyn R. Bertozzi
- Pavel Bochev
- Eric E. Dors
- Christopher L. Fryer
- David J. Schlegel
- Brian D. Wirth
- Peidong Yang
- Jizhong (Joe) Zhou

2020

- Yi Cui - Energy Science and Innovation
- Dana M. Dattelbaum - National Security and Nonproliferation
- Dustin H. Froula - Fusion and Plasma Sciences
- M. Zahid Hasan - Condensed Matter and Materials Sciences
- Daniel Kasen - Nuclear Physics
- Robert B. Ross - Computer, Information, and Knowledge Sciences
- Susannah G. Tringe - Biological and Environmental Sciences
- Krista S. Walton - Atomic, Molecular, and Chemical Sciences

2021

- Matthew C. Beard - Atomic, Molecular, and Chemical Sciences
- Luis Chacón - Fusion and Plasma Sciences
- Andrew J. Landahl - Computer, Information, and Knowledge Sciences
- Jennifer Pett-Ridge - Biological and Environmental Sciences
- Sofia Quaglioni - Nuclear Physics
- Philip C. Schuster and Natalia Toro - High Energy Physics
- Rachel A. Segalman - Condensed Matter and Materials Sciences
- Daniel B. Sinars - National Security and Nonproliferation
- Jie Xiao - Energy Science and Innovation
