= Dana Dattelbaum =

American physicist

Dana Mcgraw Dattelbaum
- Education: University of North Carolina at Chapel Hill; James Madison University
- Scientific career
- Fields: Shock wave Explosives; Chemistry
- Workplaces: Los Alamos National Laboratory
- Thesis: Excited State Electronic Structure of Polypyridyl Complexes of Rhenium, Ruthenium, and Osmium (2001)
- Doctoral advisor: Thomas J. Meyer

Dana Dattelbaum is an American physicist and scientist at Los Alamos National Laboratory. She leads NNSA’s Dynamic Materials Properties portfolio at LANL, which provides experimental data, platforms and diagnostics for materials behaviors relevant to nuclear weapons performance, ranging from plutonium to high explosives.

Dattelbaum is internationally recognized for her research on shock and detonation physics, the shock initiation of energetic materials, static to time-resolved spectroscopies, and studying materials at extreme conditions.

== Education ==
Dattelbaum completed her Bachelor of Science in chemistry in 1996 at James Madison University and participated in NSF-REU and departmental internships at the university. She completed an honors these on nitrogen ylide chemistry under Gary Crowther. She received her Ph.D. from the University of North Carolina at Chapel Hill with Thomas J. Meyer in 2001. Her work elucidated excited state electronic structures in Re, Ru, and Os polypyridyl complexes and she was the first to develop time-resolved near infrared spectroscopy using step-scan Fourier transform interferometry.

== Research and career ==
Dattelbaum is an R&D Scientist within the Dynamic Experiments (M) division at Los Alamos National Laboratory. She has over 200 publications (h-index of 37), and is Past-Chair of the American Physical Society’s Topical Group on Shock Compression of Condensed Matter. Recent awards and honors include E. O. Lawrence Award (2020), Los Alamos National Laboratory Fellow (2019), Laboratory Fellow’s Prize for Leadership (2016), Fellow of the American Physical Society (2014), over 7 DOE/NNSA Defense Program Awards of Excellence, 2016 New Mexico Technology Council Women In Technology Finalist, and a 2007 LANL Star award. She is the LANL representative for the Stockpile Stewardship Academic Alliance, a steering committee member for the Chicago-DOE Alliance Center (CDAC), LANL’s elector for NSF’s COMPRES consortium, and is a member of the editorial board of the Journal of the Dynamic Behavior of Materials. She also serves on the Committee on Careers and Professional Development for the American Physical Society (2019-2021). Dattelbaum makes extensive use on X-ray Light Sources in her research. She pioneered work on shock-dissipating fractal cubes based on Menger geometry.

== Awards and recognition ==
- 2014 Fellow, American Physical Society
- 2016 Fellow’s Prize for Leadership, Los Alamos National Laboratory
- 2019 Laboratory Fellow, Los Alamos National Laboratory
- 2020 Department of Energy Ernest Orlando Lawrence award
