= Kenneth E. Wilzbach =

American chemist

Kenneth E. Wilzbach (October 14, 1920, Chicago – April 9, 2004, Bayside, California) was an American chemist, known for his contribution to biological and medical research through his development of tritium labelling in biological compounds. The Wilzbach method is named in his honor.

== Biography ==
Wilzbach was born and raised in Chicago. He graduated in chemistry from the University of Chicago with a bachelor's degree in 1940 and a Ph.D. in 1946. He joined Argonne National Laboratory in 1950 and worked there for forty years as a senior chemist.

... Wilzbach worked on projects including tracer compounds and analyzing rocks before switching in 1976 to energy and environmental systems.

He was one of five winners of the 1961 Ernest O. Lawrence Award; his award in the Life Sciences division was for "his development of tritium labeling of biologically important compounds, which have permitted major advances in biology and medicine."

Wilzbach and his wife Eileen (née Marcin) had a 41-year marriage. She was born in 1924 and died in 1987. Upon his death he was survived by four sons, a daughter, nine grandchildren, and three great-grandchildren.

== Selected publications ==
- Finholt, A. E.; Bond, A. C.; Wilzbach, K. E.; Schlesinger, H. I. (1947). "The Preparation and Some Properties of Hydrides of Elements of the Fourth Group of the Periodic System and of their Organic Derivatives". Journal of the American Chemical Society. 69 (11): 2692–2696. doi:10.1021/ja01203a041.
- Barbaras, Glenn D.; Dillard, Clyde; Finholt, A. E.; Wartik, Thomas; Wilzbach, K. E.; Schlesinger, H. I. (1951). "The Preparation of the Hydrides of Zinc, Cadmium, Beryllium, Magnesium and Lithium by the Use of Lithium Aluminum Hydride". Journal of the American Chemical Society. 73 (10): 4585–4590. doi:10.1021/ja01154a025.
- Wilzbach, Kenneth E. (1957). "Tritium-Labeling by Exposure of Organic Compounds to Tritium Gas". Journal of the American Chemical Society. 79 (4): 1013. doi:10.1021/ja01561a078. (over 900 citations)
- Wilzbach, K. E.; Kaplan, Louis (1966). "A Photochemical 1,3 Cycloaddition of Olefins to Benzene". Journal of the American Chemical Society. 88 (9): 2066–2067. doi:10.1021/ja00961a052.
- Wilzbach, K. E.; Ritscher, James S.; Kaplan, Louis. (1967). "Benzvalene, the Tricyclic Valence Isomer of Benzene". Journal of the American Chemical Society. 89 (4): 1031–1032. doi:10.1021/ja00980a053.
- Wilzbach, Kenneth E.; Rausch, David J. (1970). "Photochemistry of nitrogen heterocycles. Dewar pyridine and its intermediacy in photoreduction and photohydration of pyridine". Journal of the American Chemical Society. 92 (7): 2178–2179. doi:10.1021/ja00710a088.
