= Brian Wirth =

American engineer

Brian D. Wirth is an American nuclear engineer and metallurgist, the Governor's Chair Professor at the University of Tennessee and Oak Ridge National Laboratory. His research has concerned the effects of irradiation on metals, with the aim of increasing the lifetime of structural components of nuclear reactors.

Wirth was a 2003 recipient of the Presidential Early Career Award for Scientists and Engineers, and a 2014 recipient of the Ernest Orlando Lawrence Award of the United States Department of Energy. He was elected as a Fellow of the American Association for the Advancement of Science in 2016, as a Fellow of the American Nuclear Society in 2017, and as a Fellow of the American Physical Society in 2025.
