= Krista S. Walton =

American chemical engineer

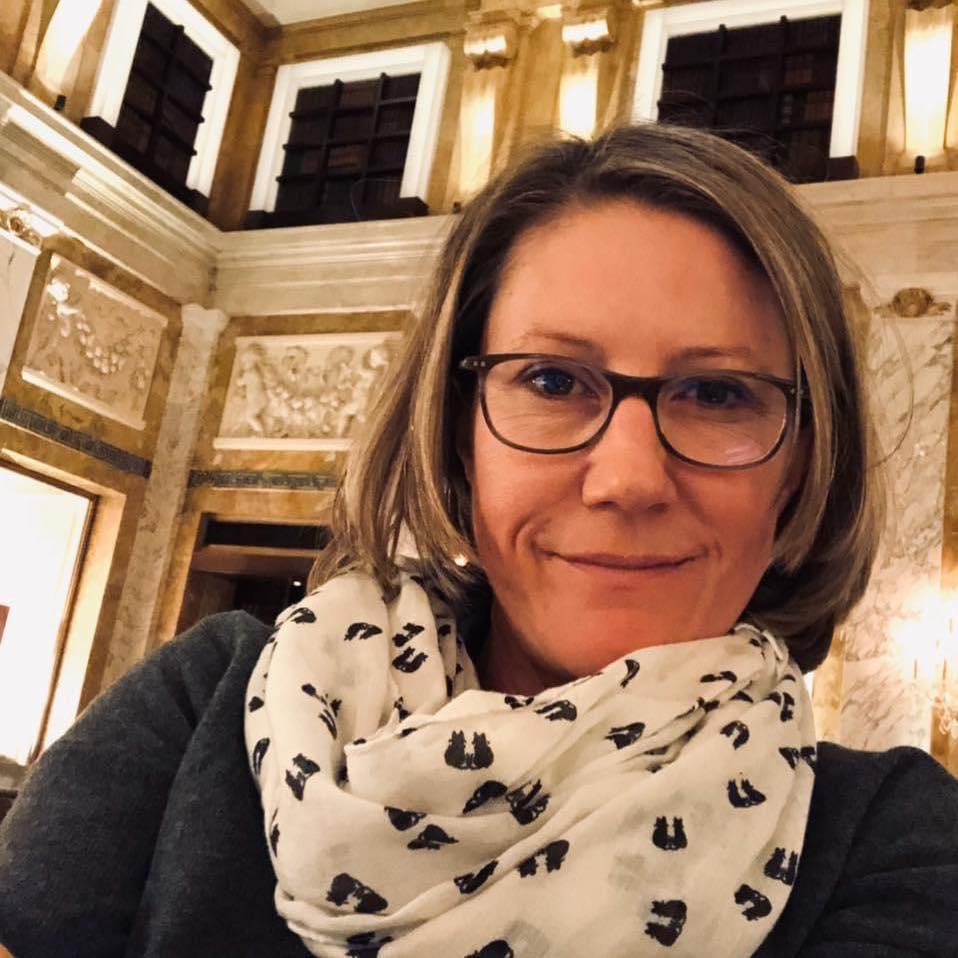
- Born: Krista Shereé Walton c.1977 (age 48–49); Florence, Alabama
- Known for: Adsorption; Metal-organic framework Carbide-derived carbon Separation process Nanotechnology
- Awards: Defense Science Study Group, 2020-2021; FRI/John G. Kunesh Award for Excellence in Separations Research, 2016, American Institute of Chemical Engineers; ACS Women Chemists Committee Rising Star Award, 2013; CAREER Award, National Science Foundation, 2009; Presidential Early Career Award for Scientists and Engineers (PECASE), DoD Recipient, 2007
- Scientific career
- Fields: Chemical engineering Chemistry; Chemical separations Adsorption science
- Institutions: Georgia Institute of Technology
- Doctoral advisor: M. Douglas LeVan

Krista Shereé Walton (born c. 1977) is an American chemical engineer. She is currently the Vice Chancellor for Research and Innovation and Distinguished University Professor of chemical and biomolecular engineering at NC State University.

== Background and education ==
Walton grew up on her family's farm in Killen, Alabama, and graduated from Brooks High School in 1995. She completed her B.S.E. in chemical and materials engineering from the University of Alabama in Huntsville in 2000 and obtained her Ph.D. in chemical engineering from Vanderbilt University in 2005 under the direction of M. Douglas LeVan. Walton was awarded an Alternative Energy Fellowship by the American Chemical Society Petroleum Research Fund in 2005 and completed postdoctoral research with Randall Q. Snurr in Chemical & Biological Engineering at Northwestern University from 2005 to 2006.

== Academic career ==
Walton began her faculty career at Kansas State University as an assistant professor of chemical engineering in 2006. She won several prestigious research awards during that time, including the Presidential Early Career Award for Scientists and Engineers (PECASE) in 2007. Walton moved to the School of Chemical & Biomolecular Engineering at Georgia Tech as an assistant professor in 2009. She received tenure in 2012 and was promoted to the rank of full professor in 2016. Walton became the founding director and lead principal investigator of Georgia Tech's DOE Energy Frontier Research Center UNCAGE-ME in 2014 and led her team to a renewal in 2018. She served as associate editor for the ACS journal Industrial & Engineering Chemistry Research from 2014-2024 and has been active in the Separations Division of AIChE for over 15 years. She is currently an Associate Editor for AIChE Journal and Adsorption. Walton served as Treasurer in the International Adsorption Society 2010-2015 and was the co-chair of the 14th International Conference on the Fundamentals of Adsorption (FOA14) held in the US in 2022. Walton served a 2-year term in the 2022-2024 cohort of the Defense Science Study Group (DSSG). The DSSG is directed by the non-profit Institute for Defense Analyses (IDA) and is sponsored by the Defense Advanced Research Projects Agency (DARPA). Walton served as the associate dean for research in the College of Engineering at Georgia Tech from 2019-2023 and the associate vice president for research operations and infrastructure from 2023-2025. She became the 6th Vice Chancellor for Research and Innovation at NC State University in June 2025.

== Research interests ==
Research in the Walton Group focuses on the design, synthesis, and characterization of functional porous materials for use in chemical separations. Applications of interest include CO_{2} capture, air purification, natural gas upgrading, and atmospheric water harvesting. Her group is particularly interested in the behavior and modeling of complex mixture adsorption and seeks to develop structure-property relationships for adsorption and chemical stability of metal-organic frameworks. She has mentored 30 Ph.D graduates and published over 140 peer-reviewed articles. She has also written several book chapters and is a co-author of Chapter 16: Adsorption and Ion Exchange in the recent 9th edition of Perry's Chemical Engineers' Handbook. Walton is active in the research community and has presented over 100 keynotes, plenary lectures, and invited seminars.

== Awards and recognition ==
- Fellow, American Association for the Advancement of Science, 2025
- American Institute of Chemical Engineers Institute Award for Excellence in Industrial Gases Technology, 2024
- Fellow of the International Adsorption Society, 2020
- Ernest Orlando Lawrence Award, 2020
- Selected to 2020–2021 cohort of the Defense Science Study Group (DSSG)
- AIChE FRI/John G. Kunesh Award for Excellence in Separations Research, 2016
- University of Alabama-Huntsville Alumni of Achievement Award, 2015
- ACS Women Chemists Committee Rising Star Award, 2015
- UAH College of Engineering Distinguished Speaker, 2015
- International Adsorption Society Award for Excellence in Publications by a Young Member of the Society (Inaugural Award), 2013
- Kavli Fellow, National Academy of Sciences (NAS) German-American Frontiers of Science Symposium (GAFOS), Meeting Chair (U.S. side), 2012
- Young Scientist Delegation, IAP/World Economic Forum's "Summer Davos" in Dalian, People's Republic of China, Invitee (1 of 2 US Young Scientists chosen after nomination by the US National Academies), 2011
- National Science Foundation CAREER Award, 2009
- Presidential Early Career Award for Scientists and Engineers (PECASE), DoD Recipient, 2007
- Army Research Office Young Investigator Program (YIP) Award, 2007
- American Chemical Society Petroleum Research Fund Alternative Energy Postdoctoral Fellowship, 2005
- AIChE Separations Division Graduate Research Award, Adsorption and Ion Exchange, 2005
- IBM Graduate Fellowship, 2000-2005
