= Herbert J.C. Kouts =

American physicist (1919–2008)

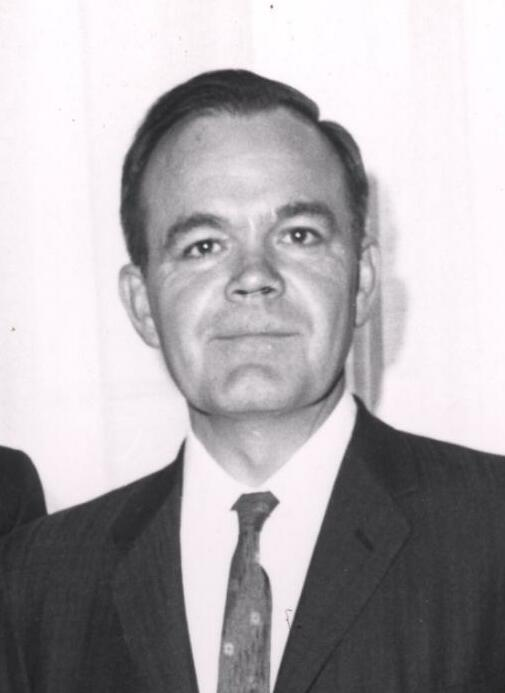
Kouts in 1963

Herbert John Cecil Kouts (December 18, 1919 – January 7, 2008) was an American nuclear physicist and engineer, a pioneer in nuclear safety, director of nuclear reactor safety research at the Atomic Energy Commission. Kouts was elected to the National Academy of Engineering in 1978 "for contributions in nuclear engineering, especially physical principles and safety of nuclear power reactors and nuclear materials safeguards". Kouts received the Atomic Energy Commission's Ernest Orlando Lawrence Award in 1963.

Born in Bisbee, Arizona, Kouts attended Ball High School in Galveston, Texas from 1933 to 1935 and graduated from C. E. Byrd High School in Shreveport, Louisiana in June 1936. He then attended Louisiana State University, earning a B.A. degree in mathematics in June 1941 and continuing graduate studies until January 1942. He was commissioned in the U.S. Army Signal Corps in 1942 and then served as an airborne radar specialist in the Army Air Forces until 1945. After World War II, Kouts returned to Louisiana State in September 1945 and completed an M.S. degree in physics in June 1946. He then attended Princeton University, receiving a Ph.D. degree in physics in January 1952. His doctoral thesis was entitled An investigation into certain features of the motion of a rigid charge distribution.

Kouts died at Brookhaven Memorial Hospital in East Patchogue, New York from congestive heart failure and complications from a fall.
