= Advanced Light Source =

Synchrotron radiation facility

Coordinates: 37.8757°N 122.2485°W

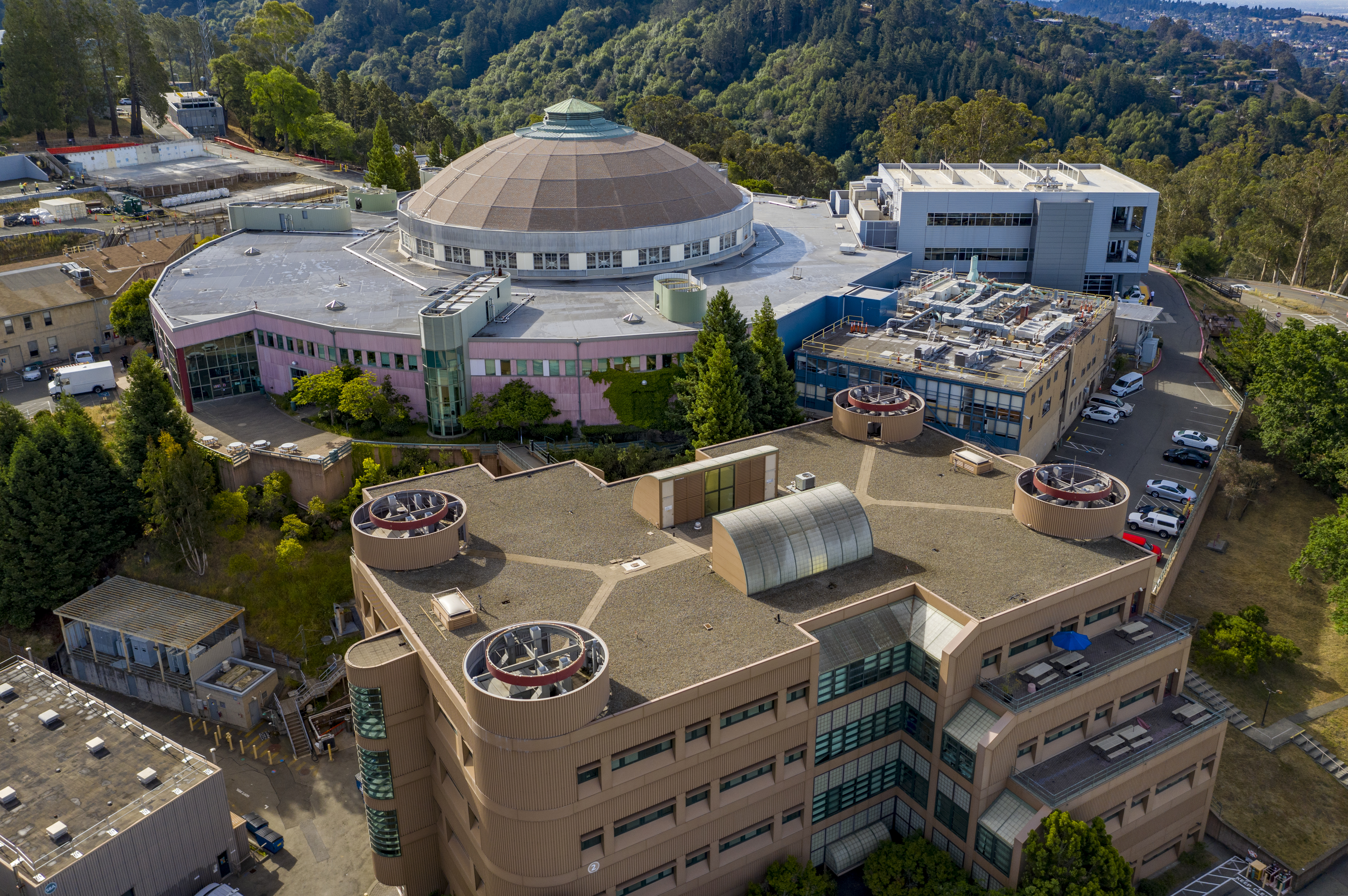
The Advanced Light Source and surrounding buildings at Lawrence Berkeley National Laboratory

The Advanced Light Source (ALS) is a research facility at Lawrence Berkeley National Laboratory in Berkeley, California. One of the world's brightest sources of ultraviolet and soft x-ray light, the ALS is the first "third-generation" synchrotron light source in its energy range, providing multiple extremely bright sources of intense and coherent short-wavelength light for use in scientific experiments by researchers from around the world. It is funded by the US Department of Energy (DOE) and operated by the University of California. The current director is Dimitri Argyriou.

== Users ==
The ALS serves about 2,000 researchers ("users") every year from academic, industrial, and government laboratories worldwide. Experiments at the ALS are performed at nearly 40 beamlines that can operate simultaneously over 5,000 hours per year, resulting in nearly 1,000 scientific publications annually in a wide variety of fields. Any qualified researcher can propose to use an ALS beamline. Peer review is used to select from among the most important proposals received from researchers who apply for beam time at the ALS. No charge is made for beam time if a user's research is nonproprietary (i.e., the user plans to publish the results in the open literature). About 16% of users come from outside the US.

== How it works ==
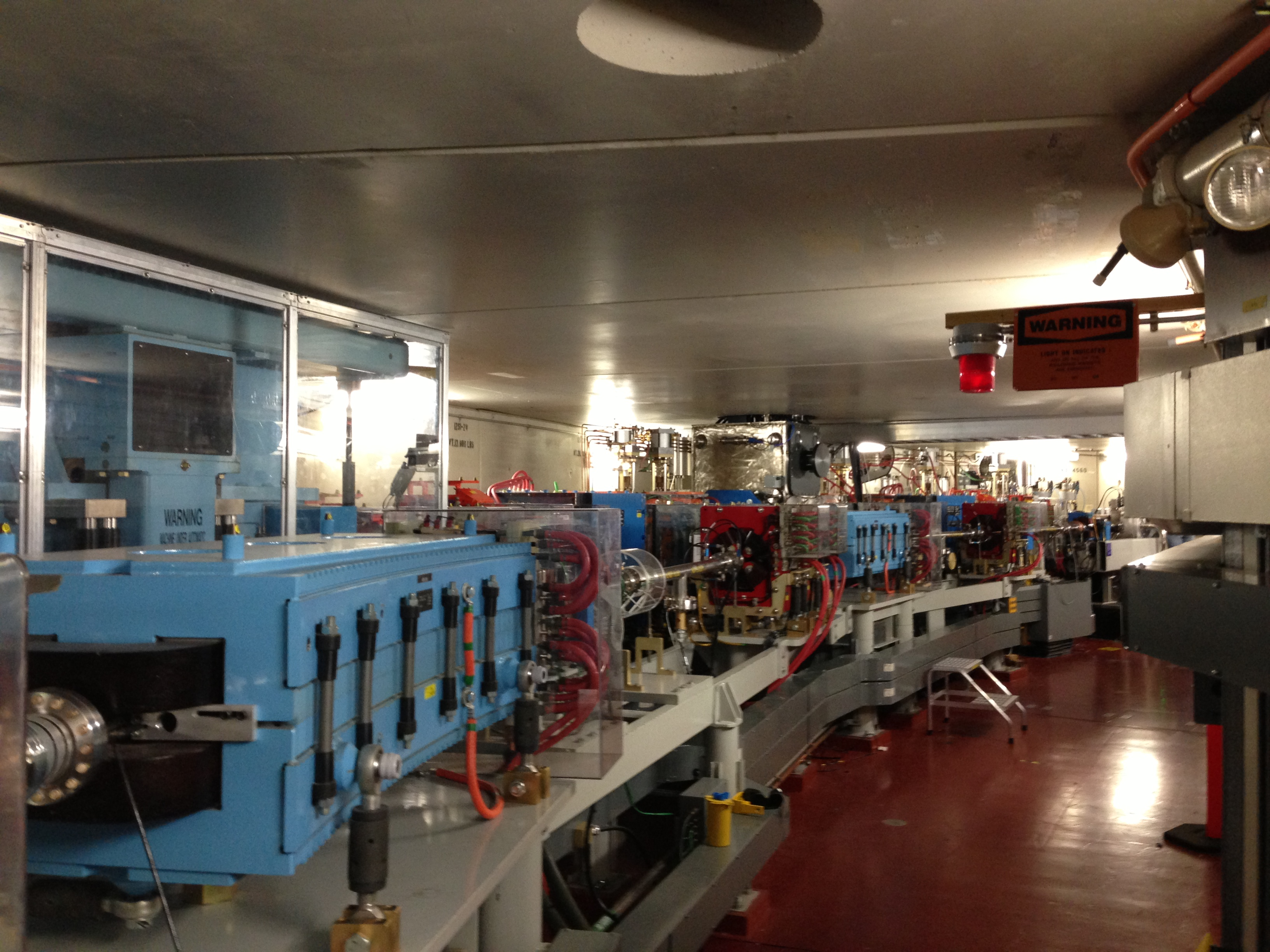
Inside the storage ring at the Advanced Light Source, Lawrence Berkeley National Laboratory. Large magnets bend, steer, and focus the electron beam as it circles the ring 1.4 million times per second.

Electron bunches traveling near the speed of light are forced into a nearly circular path by magnets in the ALS storage ring. Between these magnets there are straight sections where the electrons are forced into a slalom-like path by dozens of magnets of alternating polarity in devices called "undulators." Under the influence of these magnets, electrons emit beams of electromagnetic radiation, from the infrared through the visible, ultraviolet, and x-ray regimes. The resulting beams, collimated along the direction of the electrons' path, shine down beamlines to instruments at experiment endstations.

== Research areas ==
Lower-energy soft x-ray light is the ALS' specialty, filling an important niche and complementing other DOE light source facilities. Higher-energy x-rays are also available from locations where superconducting magnets create "superbends" in the electrons' path. Soft x-rays are used to characterize the electronic structure of matter and to reveal microscopic structures with elemental and chemical specificity. Research in materials science, biology, chemistry, physics, and the environmental sciences make use of these capabilities.

=== Ongoing research topics and techniques ===
- Probing the electronic structure of matter
- Testing optics and photoresists for next generation photolithography
- Understanding magnetic materials
- 3D biological imaging
- Protein crystallography
- Ozone photochemistry
- X-ray microscopy of cells
- Chemical reaction dynamics
- Atomic and molecular physics
- Extreme ultraviolet lithography
- Synchrotron infrared nano-spectroscopy (SINS)

=== Scientific and technological innovations and advancements ===
- Longer-lasting lithium-ion batteries for electric vehicles and mobile electronics
- Nanoscale magnetic imaging for compact data storage
- Plastic solar cells that are flexible and easy to produce
- Harnessing "artificial photosynthesis" for clean, renewable energy
- Fine-tuning combustion for cleaner-burning fuels
- More effective chemical reactions for fuel cells, pollution control, or fuel refinement
- Using microbes to clean up toxins in the environment
- Cheaper biofuels from abundant, renewable plants
- Solving protein structures for rational drug design
- Producing ever-smaller transistors for more powerful computers

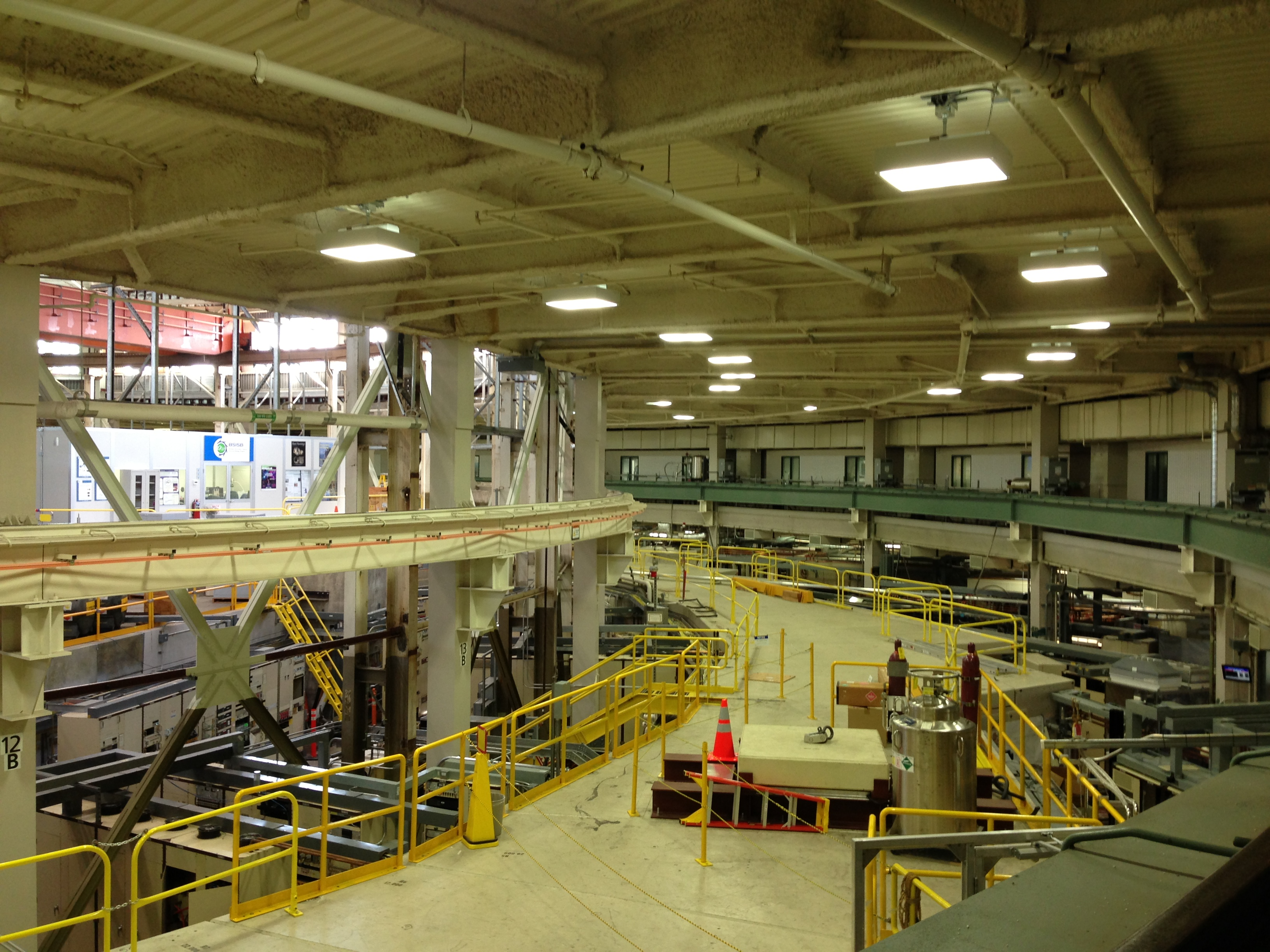
View of the storage ring from the ALS overlook

== History ==
When the ALS was first proposed in the early 1980s by former LBNL director David Shirley, skeptics doubted the use of a synchrotron optimized for soft x-rays and ultraviolet light. According to former ALS director Daniel Chemla, "The scientific case for a third-generation soft x-ray facility such as the ALS had always been fundamentally sound. However, getting the larger scientific community to believe it was an uphill battle."

The 1987 Reagan administration budget allocated $1.5 million for the construction of the ALS. The planning and design process began in 1987, ground was broken in 1988, and construction was completed in 1993. The new building incorporated a 1930s-era domed structure designed by Arthur Brown, Jr. (designer of the Coit Tower in San Francisco) to house E. O. Lawrence's 184-inch cyclotron, an advanced version of his first cyclotron for which he received the 1939 Nobel Prize in Physics.

The ALS was commissioned in March 1993, and the official dedication took place on the morning of October 22, 1993.

== ALS-U ==
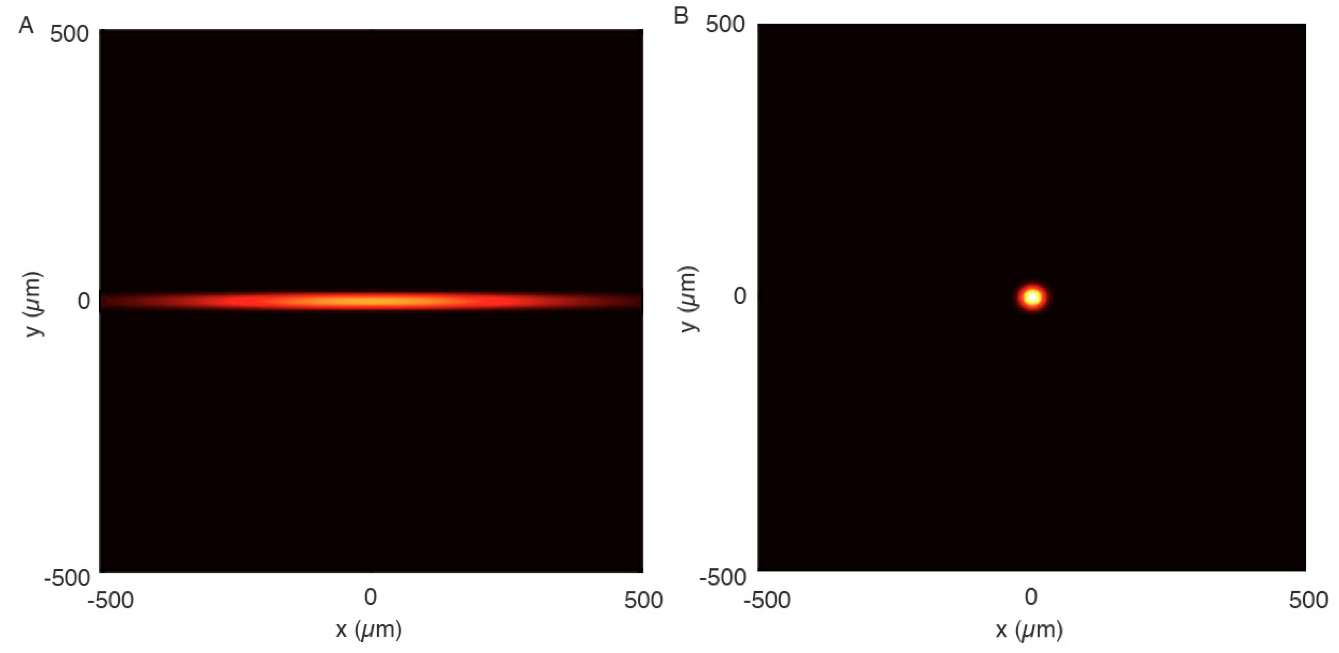
Comparison of the beam profiles of ALS (A) and ALS-U (B). The highly focused beams of ALS-U will enable new scientific advances.

A new project called ALS-U is working to upgrade the ALS. Recent accelerator physics breakthroughs now enable the production of highly focused beams of soft x-ray light that are at least 100 times brighter than those of the existing ALS.

The storage ring will receive a number of new upgrades, as well as a new accumulator ring. The new ring will use powerful, compact magnets arranged in a dense, circular array called a multibend achromat (MBA) lattice. In combination with other improvements to the accelerator complex, the upgraded machine will produce bright, steady beams of high-energy light to probe matter with unprecedented detail.
