= David A. Shirley =

American chemist (1934–2021)

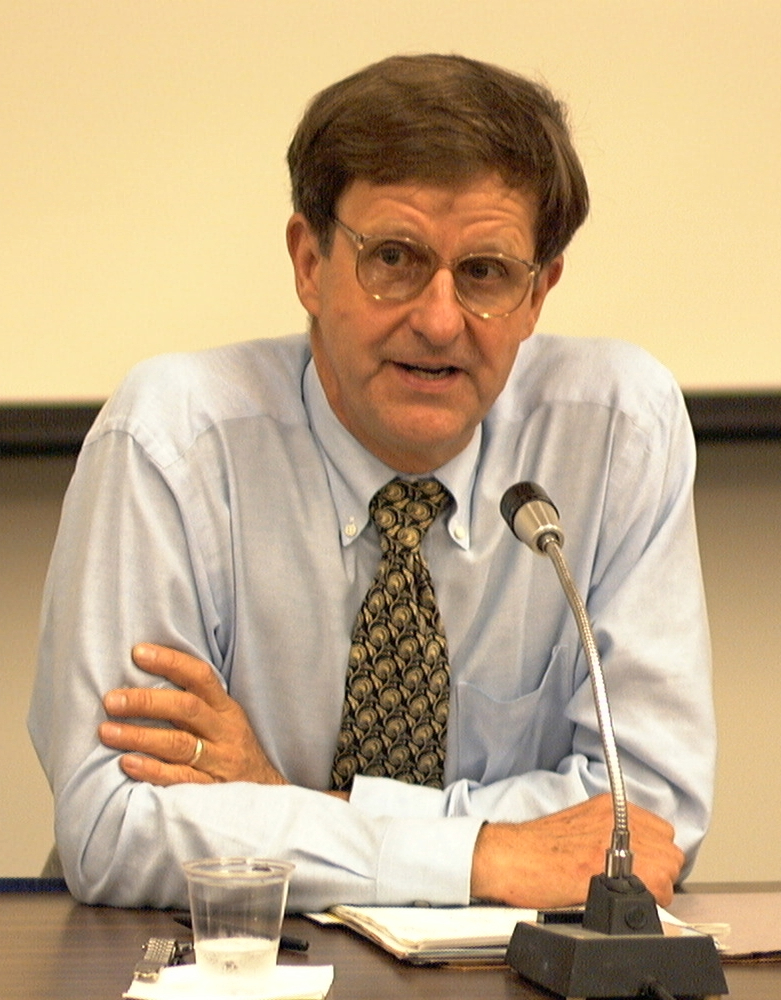
- Speaking at a symposium in 1996
- Born: March 30, 1934; North Conway, New Hampshire
- Died: March 29, 2021 (aged 86)
- Citizenship: American
- Education: University of Maine; University of California, Berkeley
- Known for: Director of Lawrence Berkeley National Laboratory
- Awards: Ernest Orlando Lawrence Award (1972)
- Scientific career
- Fields: Chemistry
- Workplaces: University of California, Berkeley; Lawrence Berkeley National Laboratory; Pennsylvania State University
- Thesis: The heat capacities and entropies of iodine and lithium chloride from 15 to 325 degrees Kelvin (1959)
- Doctoral advisor: William Giauque

David Arthur Shirley (March 30, 1934 – March 29, 2021) was an American chemist, best known as the fourth director of the Lawrence Berkeley National Laboratory from 1980 to 1989, and for spearheading the funding and creation of the Advanced Light Source.

== Biography ==
David Arthur Shirley was born in North Conway, New Hampshire, on March 30, 1934. He earned a Bachelor of Science degree in chemistry from the University of Maine in 1955, and then entered the University of California, Berkeley, where he completed his PhD, writing his 1959 doctoral thesis on "The heat capacities and entropies of iodine and lithium chloride from 15 to 325 degrees Kelvin", under the supervision of William Giauque.

Shirley married Virginia Schultz in 1956, and they had five children together, David, Diane, Michael, Eric and Gail Shirley. Shirley has a total of eleven grandchildren, Brian, Arthur, Kevin, Colleen, Sarah, Lauren, Catalina, Wendell, Wilbur, Darian and Madelyn.

Shirley became a lecturer in chemistry at Berkeley in 1959, an assistant professor in 1960, an associate professor in 1964, and a full professor in 1967. The following year he became chairman of the Chemistry Department. He was a National Science Foundation fellow at Oxford University in 1966–67, and was awarded the United States Atomic Energy Commission's Ernest Orlando Lawrence Award in 1972. His early research was into low temperature physics, nuclear orientation, and hyperfine interactions, particularly the Mössbauer effect, and he was a pioneer of X-ray photoelectron spectroscopy.

In 1975, Shirley became the Associate Laboratory Director and Head, Materials and Molecular Research Division of the Lawrence Berkeley National Laboratory. He was its fourth director, from 1980 to 1989, and was the first chemist to head the laboratory. He took the helm at a time when the laboratory had to deal with deep funding cuts, and spent most of his first two years in the job managing them. Having weathered the crisis, he attempted to prevent its recurrence by broadening the range of research projects, such as research into treatments for ocular melanoma, and development of Mina Bissell's extracellular matrix model of breast cancer. In 1987, the Lawrence Berkeley Laboratory was chosen to participate in the Human Genome Project.

Another initiative was the Center for Advanced Materials (CAM). In turn, this led to the establishment of the Center for X-Ray Optics (CXRO), the world's first research facility devoted to specialise in the use of soft x-rays and extreme ultraviolet light known as XUV. As it turned out, these are ideal for manipulating the atoms and molecules on materials' surfaces, where most chemical reactions take place. In 1984, Shirley proposed the construction of the Advanced Light Source, a synchrotron optimized to produce XUV. Not everyone saw the value in it, but the scientific case was sound, and Shirley eventually secured $100 million of funding from the Secretary of Energy, John S. Herrington. It was the first synchrotron to be built at Berkeley in almost thirty years, and was built on the site of Ernest Lawrence's 184-inch synchrotron.

Shirley stepped down as director of the Lawrence Berkeley National Laboratory on August 31, 1989, but remained at Berkeley as a professor. In 1992 he accepted a position as senior vice president for research and graduate education at Pennsylvania State University. He increased the number of minorities in graduate school, and reduced the average time to graduate. Although this was a time when the United States Congress was cutting Federal funding for research, he positioned the university so as to make the best of available opportunities, and cemented its place as the premier state university in the country for research funding from industry. He retired at the end of 1996, and returned to California with his second wife, Barbara.
