= Sofia Quaglioni =

Nuclear physicist

- Education: University of Trento
- Scientific career
- Fields: Nuclear physics
- Workplaces: Lawrence Livermore National Laboratory

Sofia Quaglioni is a nuclear physicist. She is Deputy Group Leader at the Nuclear Data and Theory Group in the Nuclear and Chemical Sciences Division in Lawrence Livermore National Laboratory (LLNL), and is a member of the DOE Topical Collaboration on Double Decay and Fundamental Symmetries.

== Biography ==
Quaglioni completed her undergraduate degree from the University of Trento, Italy, and then PhD from the same institution in 2005. She was then a postdoctoral fellow at the University of Arizona. She joined LLNL in 2006. At LLNL, Quaglioni conducts research on nuclei, investigating their properties based on the nuclear interactions between protons and neutrons.

== Honours and awards ==
- 2001 Graduated Cum Laude,University Of Trento,
- 2011 Early Career Award Winner, United States Department of Energy
- 2017 Early and Mid-Career Recognition Award, LLNL
- 2019 Fellow of the American Physical Society for "contributions to unifying theories for the structure and dynamics of light nuclei by elucidating the role of the continuum in weakly bound nuclei, and the inclusion of three-body final states and three-nucleon interactions within reaction dynamics."
- 2021 Ernest Orlando Lawrence Award Laureate

== Publications ==
- Navrátil, Petr; Quaglioni, Sofia; Stetcu, Ionel; Barrett, Bruce R (2009-08-01). "Recent developments in no-core shell-model calculations". Journal of Physics G: Nuclear and Particle Physics. 36 (8) 083101. arXiv:0904.0463. doi:10.1088/0954-3899/36/8/083101. ISSN 0954-3899. OSTI 957622. S2CID 16414572.
- Gazit, Doron; Quaglioni, Sofia; Navrátil, Petr (2009-09-01). "Three-Nucleon Low-Energy Constants from the Consistency of Interactions and Currents in Chiral Effective Field Theory". Physical Review Letters. 103 (10) 102502. arXiv:0812.4444. Bibcode:2009PhRvL.103j2502G. doi:10.1103/PhysRevLett.103.102502. ISSN 0031-9007. PMID 19792299. S2CID 1157840.
- Gysbers, P.; Hagen, G.; Holt, J. D.; Jansen, G. R.; Morris, T. D.; Navrátil, P.; Papenbrock, T.; Quaglioni, S.; Schwenk, A.; Stroberg, S. R.; Wendt, K. A. (May 2019). "Discrepancy between experimental and theoretical β-decay rates resolved from first principles". Nature Physics. 15 (5): 428–431. arXiv:1903.00047. Bibcode:2019NatPh..15..428G. doi:10.1038/s41567-019-0450-7. ISSN 1745-2473. S2CID 119005375.
- Navrátil, Petr; Quaglioni, Sofia; Hupin, Guillaume; Romero-Redondo, Carolina; Calci, Angelo (2016-05-01). "Unified ab initio approaches to nuclear structure and reactions". Physica Scripta. 91 (5) 053002. arXiv:1601.03765. Bibcode:2016PhyS...91e3002N. doi:10.1088/0031-8949/91/5/053002. ISSN 0031-8949. S2CID 119280384.
