= John L. Sarrao =

American physicist

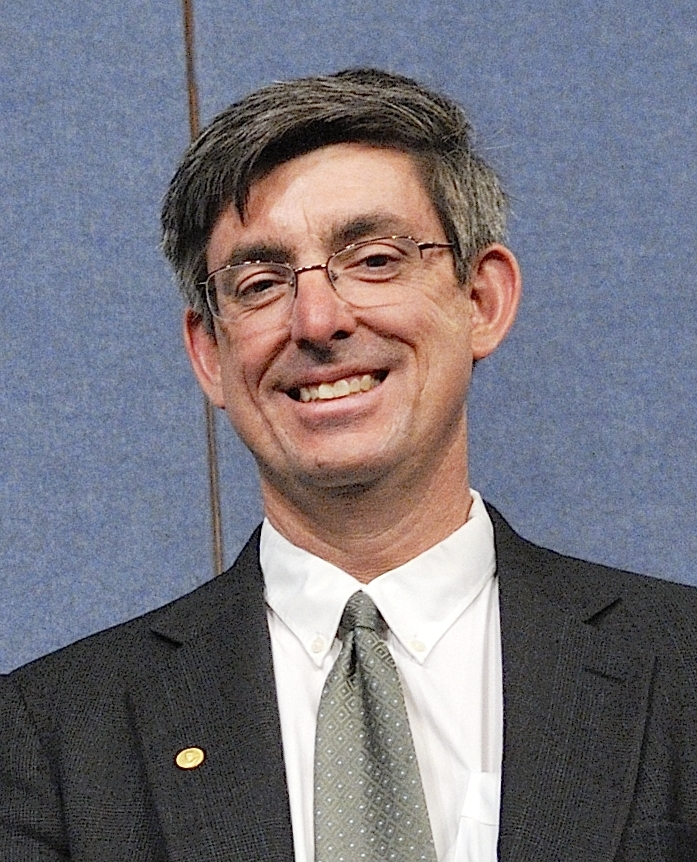
- Sarrao in 2013

6th Director of the SLAC National Accelerator Laboratory
- Incumbent
- Assumed office October 2, 2023
- President: Joe Biden
- Preceded by: Chi-Chang Kao
- Scientific career
- Education: Stanford University (BS); University of California Los Angeles (MS, PhD)
- Fields: Physics
- Workplaces: Los Alamos National Laboratory; SLAC National Accelerator Laboratory
- Thesis: Resonant ultrasound spectroscopy( RUS) study of the structural phase transition in lanthanum-strontium copper oxide (La(2-x) Sr(x) CuO(4)) (1993)
- Doctoral advisor: W. Gilbert Clark

John Louis Sarrao (born February 1, 1967) is an American physicist. He was the deputy director for science, technology, and engineering at Los Alamos National Laboratory. As of 2 October 2023, he became the sixth director of SLAC National Accelerator Laboratory

== Education ==
In 1993, Sarrao received his PhD in physics from the University of California Los Angeles following a M.S. in physics from UCLA in 1991 and a B.S. in physics from Stanford University in 1989.

He is a Fellow of the American Association for the Advancement of Science; the American Physical Society; and the Los Alamos National Laboratory.

== Career ==
He is the principal architect of LANL's Dynamic Mesoscale Material Science Capability (DMMSC).

He is a board member of the Technology Research Collaborative (TRC).

Sarrao's research includes quantum computing.

On June 7, 2018, Sarrao presented Congressional Testimony for the House Science, Space & Technology Committee Subcommittee on Energy on topics including electric grid research and big data.

== Honors and awards ==
In 2013, he was awarded the United States Department of Energy's Ernest Orlando Lawrence Award for his research in Condensed Matter and Materials Science: "For the discovery and study of new materials, especially those based on Plutonium, advancing understanding of unconventional magnetic and superconducting states in strongly correlated f-electron condensed matter systems."

He was honored for his discovery and study of new materials, especially those based on Plutonium, that advance understanding of novel magnetic and superconducting states in strongly correlated f-electron condensed matter systems. The complexity of strongly correlated materials, resulting from coupling among charge, spin, and lattice degrees-of-freedom, allows the emergence of new states and new phenomena, helping promote the development of useful and novel functional materials.
