= Jennifer Pett-Ridge =

American biologist

- Education: University of California, Berkeley; Yale University; Yale School of the Environment
- Scientific career
- Workplaces: Lawrence Livermore National Laboratory; University of California, Merced
- Thesis: Rapidly fluctuating redox regimes frame the ecology of microbial communities and their biogeochemical function in a humid tropical soil (2005)

Jennifer Pett-Ridge is an American biologist who is a senior staff scientist at the Lawrence Livermore National Laboratory. She also serves as an adjunct professor at the University of California, Merced and at an investigator at the Innovative Genomics Institute. Her research makes use of systems biology and biogeochemistry to uncover function in microbial communities. She was awarded a 2021 United States Department of Energy Ernest Orlando Lawrence Award.

== Early life and education ==
Pett-Ridge studied biology and studies in the environment at Yale University. She moved to the Yale School of the Environment for graduate studies, and specialized in forest science. She worked as a US Forest Service technician at the Hubbard Brook Experimental Forest. After earning her master's degree, Pett-Ridge joined the University of California, Berkeley for her doctoral research. Her research considered how fluctuating redox regimes impact nitrogen cycling and the ecology of microbial communities. She was appointed a postdoctoral fellow at the Lawrence Livermore National Laboratory and vice chair of soil ecology at the Ecological Society of America.

== Research and career ==
Pett-Ridge serves as lead scientist for the Microbes Persis soil microbiome Science Focus Area (SFA) and Terraforming Soil Energy Earthshot Research Center, supported by the Department of Energy Biological and Environmental Research (DOE BER). In 2023, Pett-Ridge was appointed lead of the LLNL Carbon Initiative. Pett-Ridge has worked in microbial ecology in an effort to understand and predict future climates. She developed isotopic tools (typically C and N isotope composition) and imaging tools (NanoSIMS) to quantify how climate influences the ecology of soil, microorganisms, and plants. She was supported by a United States Department of Energy Early Career award to investigate how soil microbial communities responded to changing soil oxygen conditions. In particular, she developed nanoscale secondary ion mass spectrometry. In 2023, she led the Roads to Removal report, an economy-wide, county-level evaluation of how atmospheric carbon removal can get the USA to 'net-zero.'

Pett-Ridge has investigated whether it is possible to sequester carbon dioxide using plants like switchgrass. The roots of switchgrass (Panicum virgatum) can extend 50 feet down, which can contribute to carbon sequestration by locking carbon deep into ground.

In 2020, Pett-Ridge was appointed as an investigator in the Sustainability Theme of in the Center for Advanced Bioenergy and Bioproducts Innovation (CABBI).

== Awards and honors ==
- 2019 Geochemical Society Endowed Biogeochemistry Lecture
- 2021 United States Department of Energy Ernest Orlando Lawrence Award
- 2024 Fellow of the Ecological Society of America
- 2025 Fellow of the American Association for the Advancement of Science
- 2025 Elected to Alameda County Women's Hall of Fame

== Select publications ==
- Marco Keiluweit; Jeremy J. Bougoure; Peter S. Nico; Jennifer Pett-Ridge; Peter K. Weber; Markus Kleber (2015). "Mineral protection of soil carbon counteracted by root exudates". Nature Climate Change. 5 (6): 588–595. doi:10.1038/nclimate2580. Wikidata Q110944846.
- Noah S Sokol, Eric Slessarev, Gianna Marschmann, Alexa A Nicolas, Steven Blazewicz, Eoin Brodie, Mary K Firestone, Megan Foley, Rachel Hestrin, Bruce Hungate, Benjamin Koch, Bram Stone, Matthew Sullivan, Olivier Zablocki, LLNL Soil Microbiome Consortium, Jennifer Pett-Ridge (28 February 2022). “Life and death in the soil microbiome: how ecological processes influence biogeochemistry“. Nature Reviews Microbiology 20( 7): 415-430. doi.org/10.1038/s41579-022-00695-z.
- Erin E Nuccio; Angela Hodge; Jennifer Pett-Ridge; Donald J Herman; Peter K Weber; Mary K Firestone (2013). "An arbuscular mycorrhizal fungus significantly modifies the soil bacterial community and nitrogen cycling during litter decomposition". Environmental Microbiology. 15 (6): 1870–1881. doi:10.1111/1462-2920.12081. PMID 23360621. Wikidata Q34566994.
