= Thom Dunning Jr. =

American chemist

Thom H. Dunning Jr. is an American chemist who is currently Distinguished Professor Emeritus at University of Illinois Urbana-Champaign and an Affiliate Professor in the Department of Chemistry at the University of Washington. He earned his B.S. in chemistry with minors in physics and mathematics from the University of Missouri Rolla and his Ph.D. in chemistry from the California Institute of Technology.

In 1996, he was awarded the E.O. Lawrence Award in Chemistry by the U.S Department of Energy for his, "For his seminal contributions to the development of methods and techniques for electronic structure calculations on molecules; for applications to fundamental chemical problems in laser development, combustion chemistry, and environmental chemistry; and for his leadership in the use of high-performance computing for solving the most challenging chemical problems."

== Awards ==
- E.O. Lawrence Award in Chemistry, U.S. Department of Energy (1996)
- Award for Excellence in Technology Transfer, Federal Laboratory Consortium for Technology Transfer (2000)
- Distinguished Associate Award, U.S. Departement of Energy (2001)
