= Conrad Longmire =

American theoretical physicist

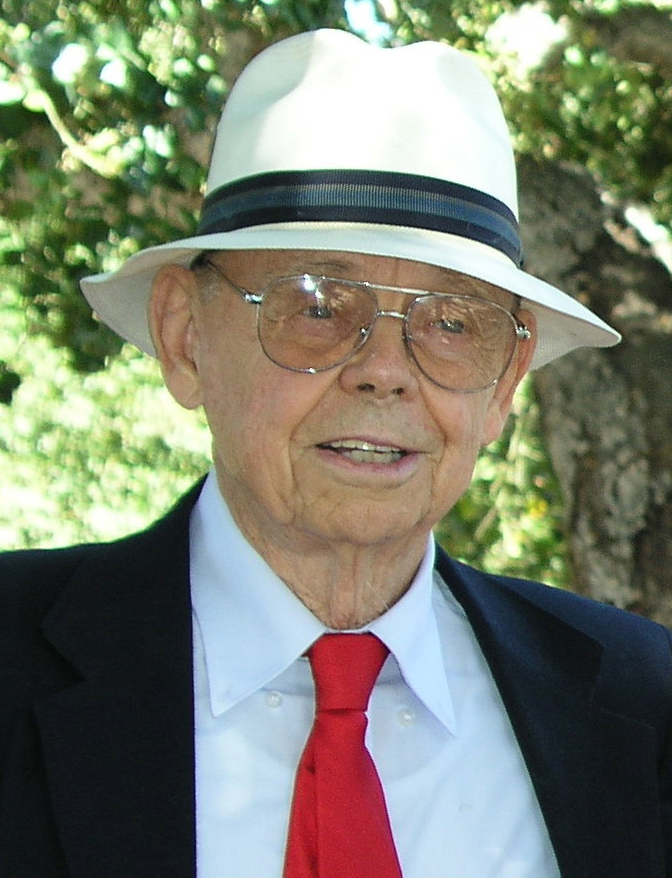
- Conrad Longmire in 2002.
- Born: August 23, 1921; Loyston, Tennessee
- Died: March 28, 2010 (aged 88); Santa Barbara, California
- Education: University of Illinois; University of Rochester
- Known for: Plasma Physics; Thermonuclear Weapons Design; Discovery of the mechanism of high-altitude nuclear electromagnetic pulse
- Awards: Ernest Orlando Lawrence Award (1961)
- Scientific career
- Fields: Physics
- Workplaces: Los Alamos National Laboratory; Mission Research Corporation

Conrad Lee Longmire (August 23, 1921 – March 22, 2010) was an American theoretical physicist who was best known as the discoverer of the mechanism behind high-altitude electromagnetic pulse.

In 1961, Longmire was awarded the Ernest Orlando Lawrence Award "for continued and original theoretical contributions, requiring unusual insight, to the development of nuclear weapons and the progress of plasma physics." In 2004 he was awarded the Los Alamos Medal, the nuclear laboratory's highest award.

== Key scientific contributions ==
Longmire performed several of the key design calculations on the very first thermonuclear weapons produced by the United States.

In 1963, he was given the electromagnetic pulse data for the 1962 Operation Fishbowl high-altitude nuclear tests code-named Bluegill Triple Prime and Kingfish. The electromagnetic pulse data had puzzled other physicists. Longmire successfully deduced why the electromagnetic pulse was so much stronger than had been erroneously calculated by Nobel-laureate Hans Bethe, and Longmire was able to derive the calculations that are still used today.

== Early years ==
Longmire graduated as valedictorian from Sibley High School in 1939 He did his undergraduate study at the University of Illinois in Urbana, graduating in 1942 with a degree in engineering physics. After spending some time working on radar at the MIT Radiation Laboratory, Longmire attended the University of Rochester in New York, where he received his doctorate in theoretical physics in 1948.

In 1949 Longmire joined Los Alamos National Laboratory, working in the theoretical division from 1949 to 1969. In his early years at Los Alamos, he took sabbaticals to teach at University of Rochester and Columbia University, teaching for one year at each institution. In 1970, Longmire co-founded Mission Research Corporation with two other scientists, but continued to be a Lab Associate for Los Alamos National Laboratories.

== Death and legacy ==
Conrad Longmire developed multiple myeloma and died from complications from the disease on March 22, 2010, at the age of 88. He was survived by his wife, Theresa, and by several children, grandchildren, and great-grandchildren.

Many of Conrad Longmire's papers on nuclear electromagnetic pulse (EMP) have been declassified, and many of those papers now form the essential basic reading components for scientists and others learning about the phenomenon of high-altitude nuclear EMP, especially as this topic is increasingly discussed in the news media and by government agencies.
