= SLAC National Accelerator Laboratory =

Research center at Stanford University

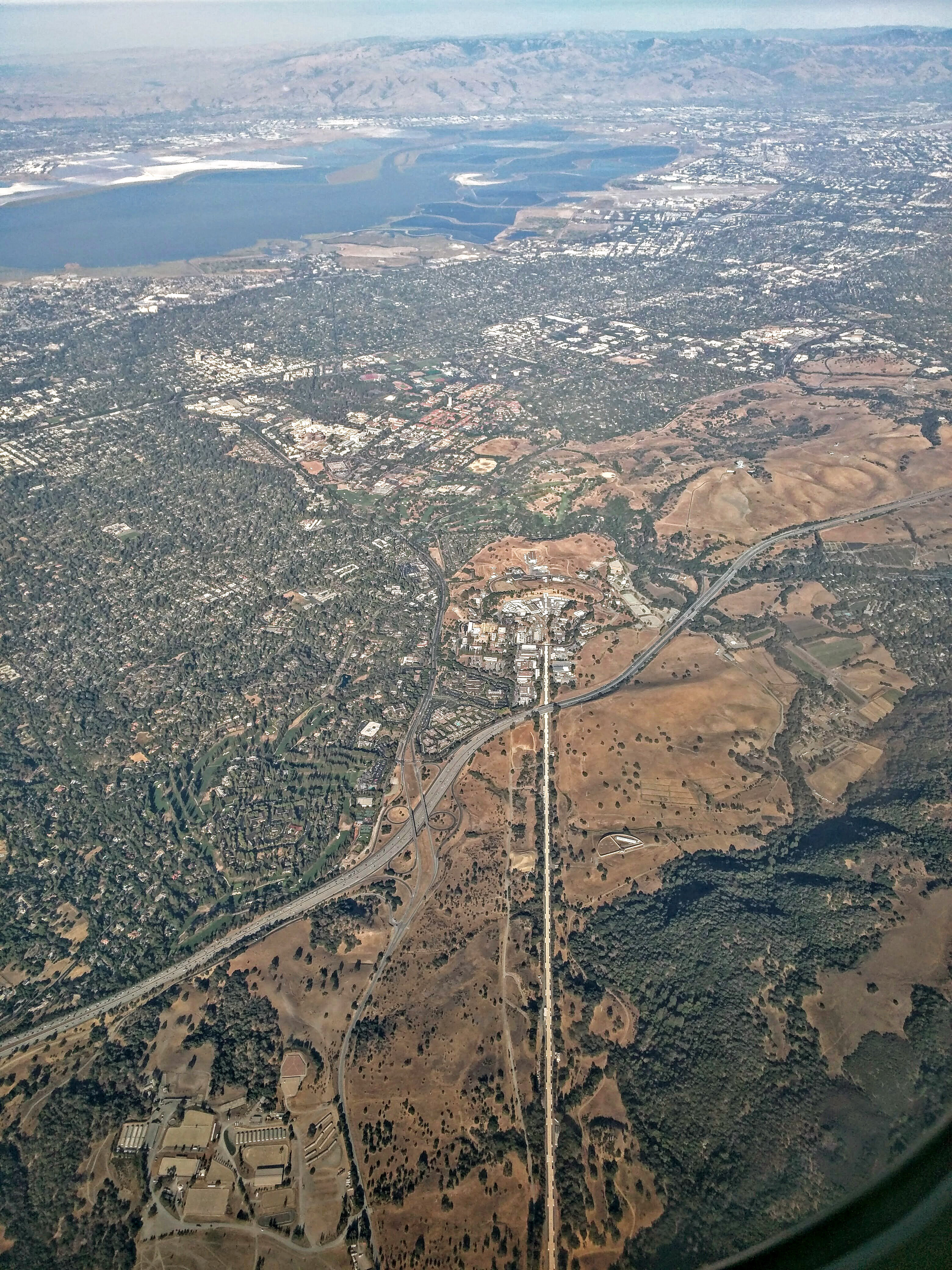
- Aerial view of former linear accelerator
- Nickname: SLAC
- Established: 1962; 64 years ago
- Research type: Physical sciences
- Budget: $383 million (2017)
- Field of research: Accelerator physics Photon science
- Director: John L. Sarrao
- Staff: 1,684
- Location: 2575 Sand Hill Rd. Menlo Park, California 94025, Menlo Park, California, United States; 37°25′03″N 122°12′09″W
- Campus: 172 ha (426 acres)
- Affiliations: United States Department of Energy
- Operating agency: Stanford University
- Nobel laureates: Burton Richter; Richard E. Taylor; Martin L. Perl
- Website: www6.slac.stanford.edu

Map
- Location within California

Stanford Linear Accelerator
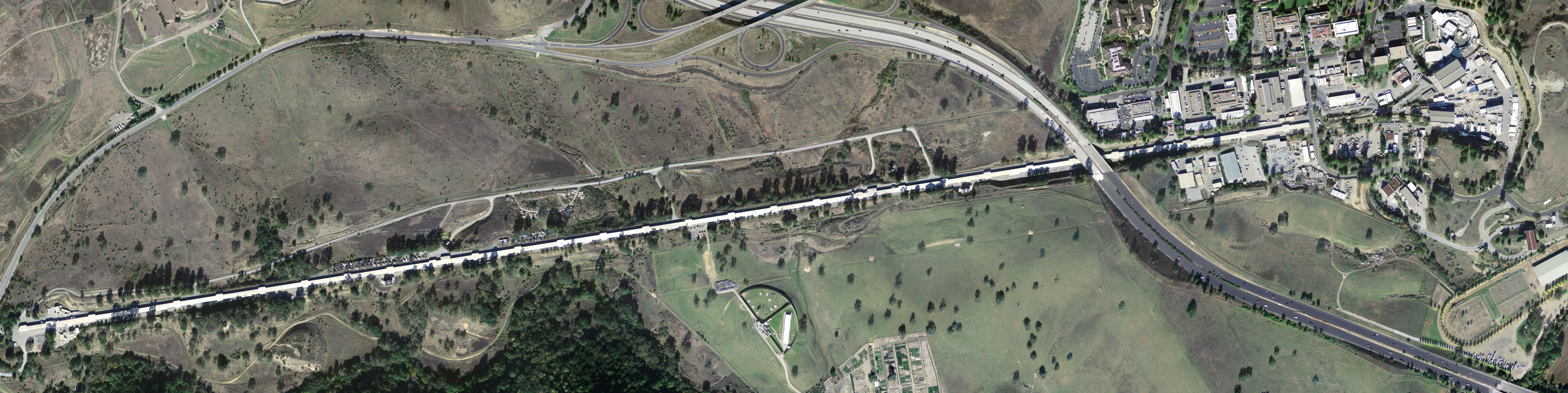

General properties
- Accelerator type: Linear accelerator
- Beam type: Electrons
- Target type: Fixed target

Beam properties
- Maximum energy: 50 GeV

Physical properties
- Length: 3.2 km (2 mi)
- Location: Menlo Park, California
- Institution: Stanford University, US-DOE
- Dates of operation: 1966–2006
- Succeeded by: LCLS

SLAC National Accelerator Laboratory, originally named the Stanford Linear Accelerator Center, is a federally funded research and development center in Menlo Park, California, United States. Founded in 1962, the laboratory is now sponsored by the United States Department of Energy and administered by Stanford University. It is the site of the Stanford Linear Accelerator, a 3.2 km (2 mi) linear accelerator constructed in 1966 that could accelerate electrons to energies of 20 GeV, and later up to 50 GeV.

Today SLAC research centers on a broad program in atomic and solid-state physics, chemistry, biology, and medicine using X-rays from synchrotron radiation and a free-electron laser as well as experimental and theoretical research in elementary particle physics, accelerator physics, astroparticle physics, and cosmology. The laboratory is under the programmatic direction of the United States Department of Energy Office of Science.

== History ==
The entrance to SLAC in Menlo Park

Founded in 1962 as the Stanford Linear Accelerator Center, the facility is located on 172 ha (426 acres) of Stanford University-owned land on Sand Hill Road in Menlo Park, California, just west of the university's main campus. The main accelerator is 3.2 km (2 mi) long, making it the longest linear accelerator in the world, and has been operational since 1966.

Research at SLAC has produced three Nobel Prizes in Physics

Research at SLAC has produced three Nobel Prizes in Physics:

- 1976: The charm quark; see J/ψ meson
- 1990: Quark structure inside protons and neutrons
- 1995: The tau lepton

In 1984, the laboratory was named an ASME National Historic Engineering Landmark and an IEEE Milestone.

SLAC developed and, in December 1991, began hosting the first World Wide Web server outside of Europe.

In the early-to-mid 1990s, the Stanford Linear Collider (SLC) investigated the properties of the Z boson using the Stanford Large Detector.

By 2005, SLAC employed over 1,000 people, some 150 of whom were physicists with doctorate degrees, and served over 3,000 visiting researchers yearly, operating particle accelerators for high-energy physics and the Stanford Synchrotron Radiation Laboratory (SSRL) for synchrotron light radiation research, which was "indispensable" in the research leading to the 2006 Nobel Prize in Chemistry awarded to Stanford Professor Roger D. Kornberg.

In October 2008, the Department of Energy announced that the center's name would be changed to SLAC National Accelerator Laboratory. The reasons given include a better representation of the new direction of the lab and the ability to trademark the laboratory's name. Stanford University had legally opposed the Department of Energy's attempt to trademark "Stanford Linear Accelerator Center".

In March 2009, it was announced that the SLAC National Accelerator Laboratory was to receive $68.3 million in Recovery Act Funding to be disbursed by Department of Energy's Office of Science.

In October 2016, Bits and Watts launched as a collaboration between SLAC and Stanford University to design "better, greener electric grids". SLAC later pulled out over concerns about an industry partner, the state-owned Chinese electric utility.

In April 2024, SLAC completed two decades of work constructing the world's largest digital camera for the Legacy Survey of Space and Time (LSST) project at the Vera C. Rubin Observatory in Chile. The camera become operational in 2025.

== Components ==
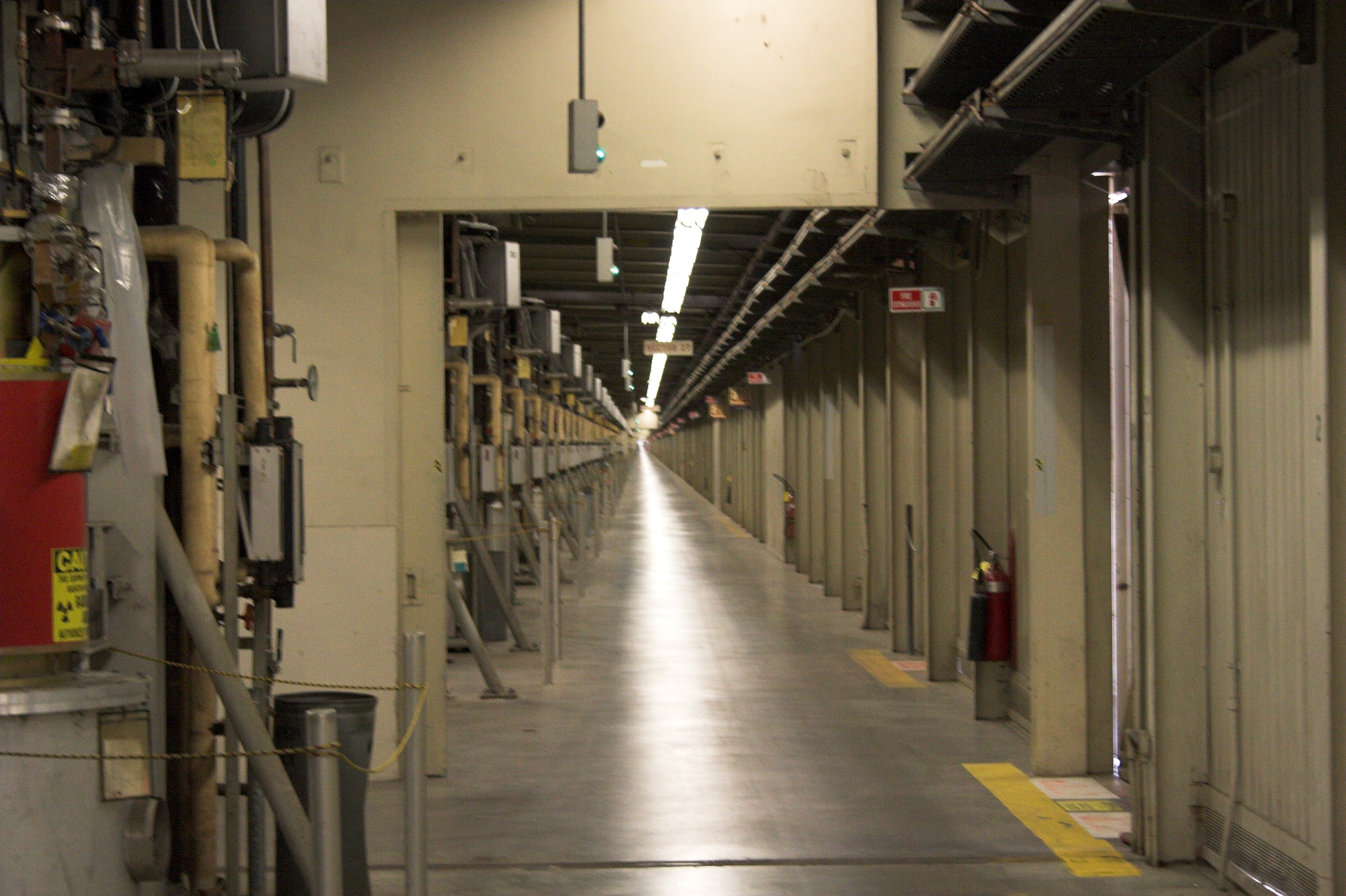
SLAC 3 km-long (2 mi) Klystron Gallery above the beamline Accelerator

=== Accelerator ===
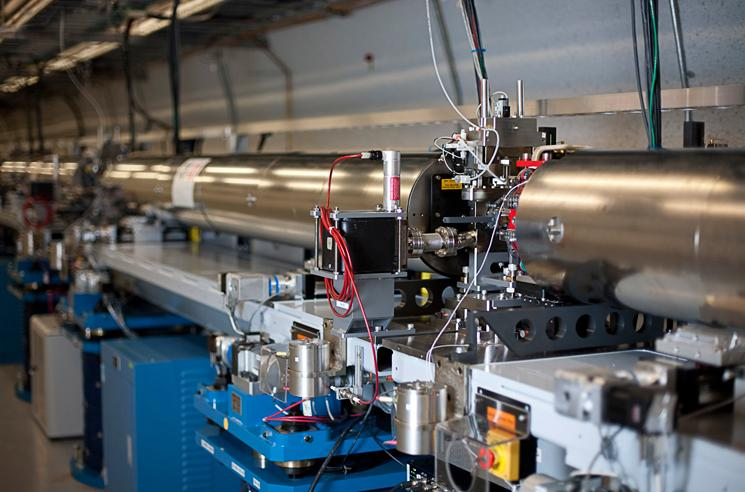
Part of the SLAC beamline

The main accelerator was an RF linear accelerator that accelerated electrons and positrons up to 50 GeV. At 3.2 km (2 mi) long, the accelerator was the longest linear accelerator in the world, and was claimed to be "the world's most straight object." until 2017 when the European x-ray free electron laser opened. The main accelerator is buried 9 m (30 ft) below ground and passes underneath Interstate Highway 280. The above-ground klystron gallery atop the beamline, was the longest building in the United States until the LIGO project's twin interferometers were completed in 1999. It is easily distinguishable from the air and is marked as a visual waypoint on aeronautical charts.

A portion of the original linear accelerator is now part of the Linac Coherent Light Source.

=== Stanford Linear Collider ===
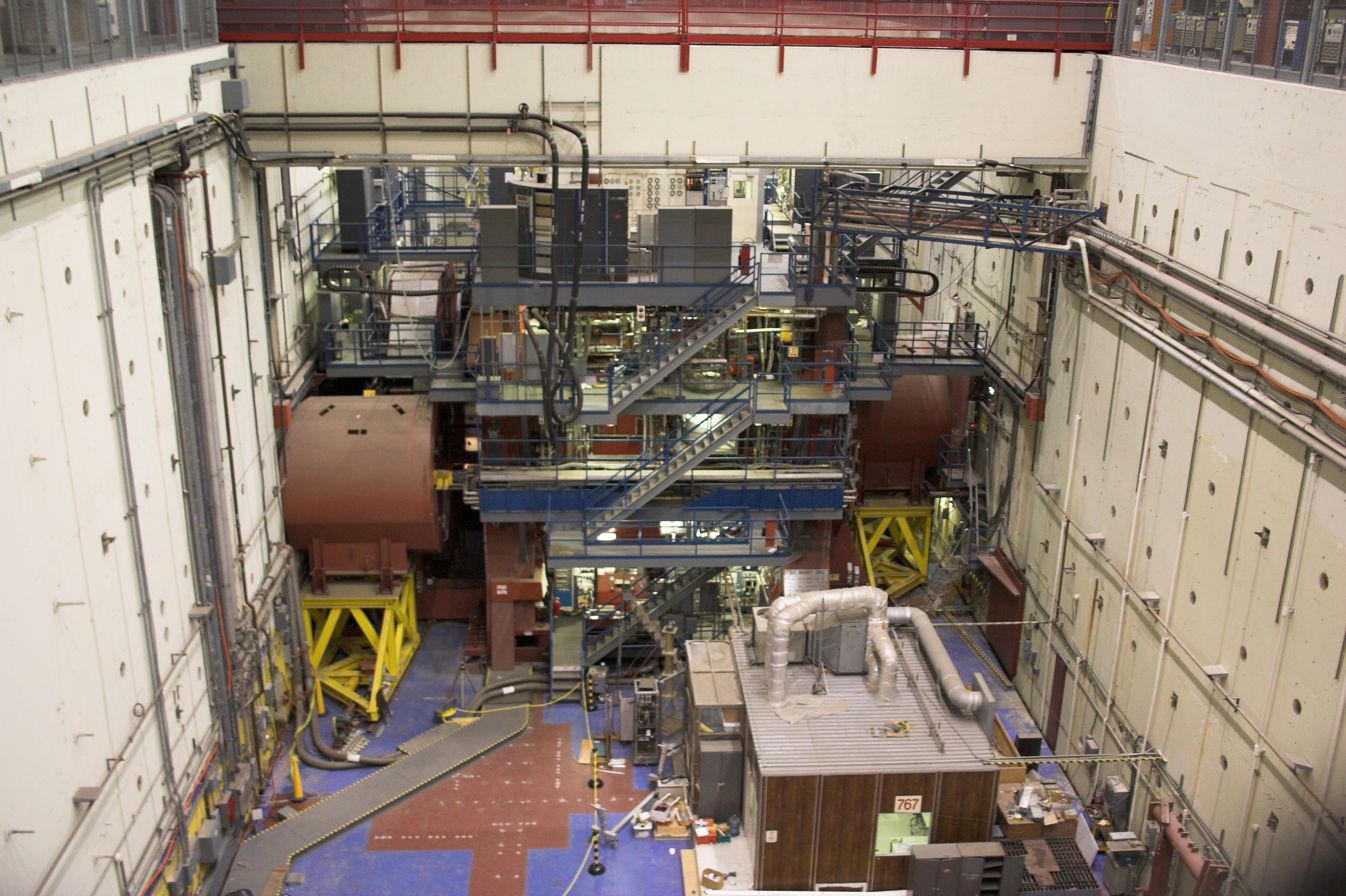
SLC pit and detector

The Stanford Linear Collider was a linear accelerator that collided electrons and positrons at SLAC. The center of mass energy was about 90 GeV, equal to the mass of the Z boson, which the accelerator was designed to study. Grad student Barrett D. Milliken discovered the first Z event on April 12, 1989, while poring over the previous day's computer data from the Mark II detector. The bulk of the data was collected by the SLAC Large Detector, which came online in 1991. Although largely overshadowed by the Large Electron–Positron Collider at CERN, which began running in 1989, the highly polarized electron beam at SLC (close to 80%) made certain unique measurements possible, such as parity violation in Z Boson-b quark coupling.

Presently no beam enters the south and north arcs in the machine, which leads to the Final Focus, therefore this section is mothballed to run beam into the PEP2 section from the beam switchyard.

=== SLAC Large Detector ===
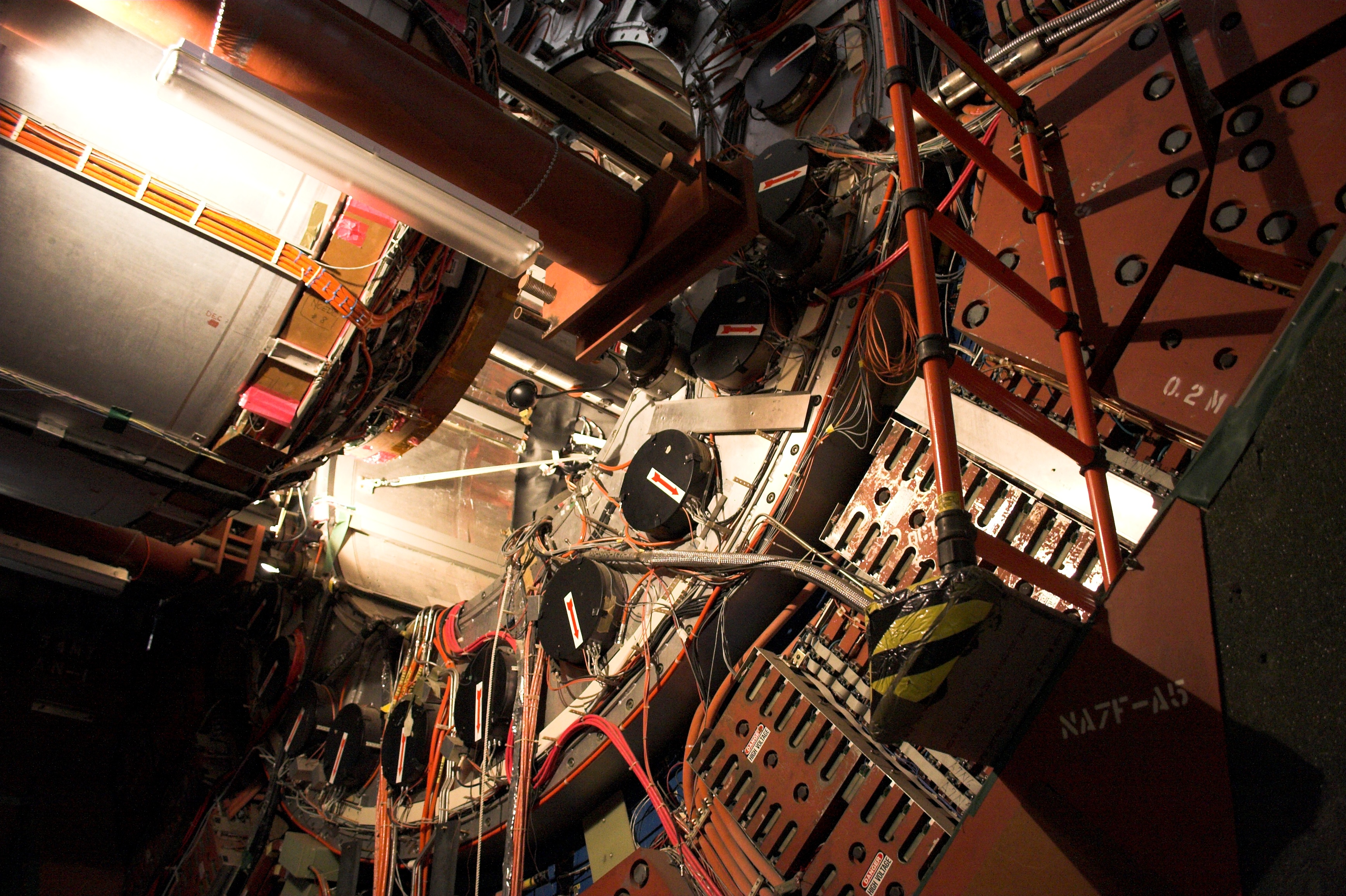
Inside view of the SLD

The SLAC Large Detector (SLD) was the main detector for the Stanford Linear Collider. It was designed primarily to detect Z bosons produced by the accelerator's electron-positron collisions. Built in 1991, the SLD operated from 1992 to 1998.

=== PEP ===
PEP (Positron-Electron Project) began operation in 1980, with center-of-mass energies up to 29 GeV. At its apex, PEP had five large particle detectors in operation, as well as a sixth smaller detector. About 300 researchers made use of PEP. PEP stopped operating in 1990, and construction on PEP-II began in 1994.

=== PEP-II ===
From 1999 to 2008, the main purpose of the linear accelerator was to inject electrons and positrons into the PEP-II accelerator, an electron-positron collider with a pair of storage rings 2.2 km (1.4 mi) in circumference. PEP-II was host to the BaBar experiment, one of the so-called B-Factory experiments studying charge-parity symmetry.

=== Stanford Synchrotron Radiation Lightsource ===
The Stanford Synchrotron Radiation Lightsource (SSRL) is a synchrotron light user facility located on the SLAC campus. Originally built for particle physics, it was used in experiments where the J/ψ meson was discovered. It is now used exclusively for materials science and biology experiments which take advantage of the high-intensity synchrotron radiation emitted by the stored electron beam to study the structure of molecules. In the early 1990s, an independent electron injector was built for this storage ring, allowing it to operate independently of the main linear accelerator.

=== Fermi Gamma-ray Space Telescope ===
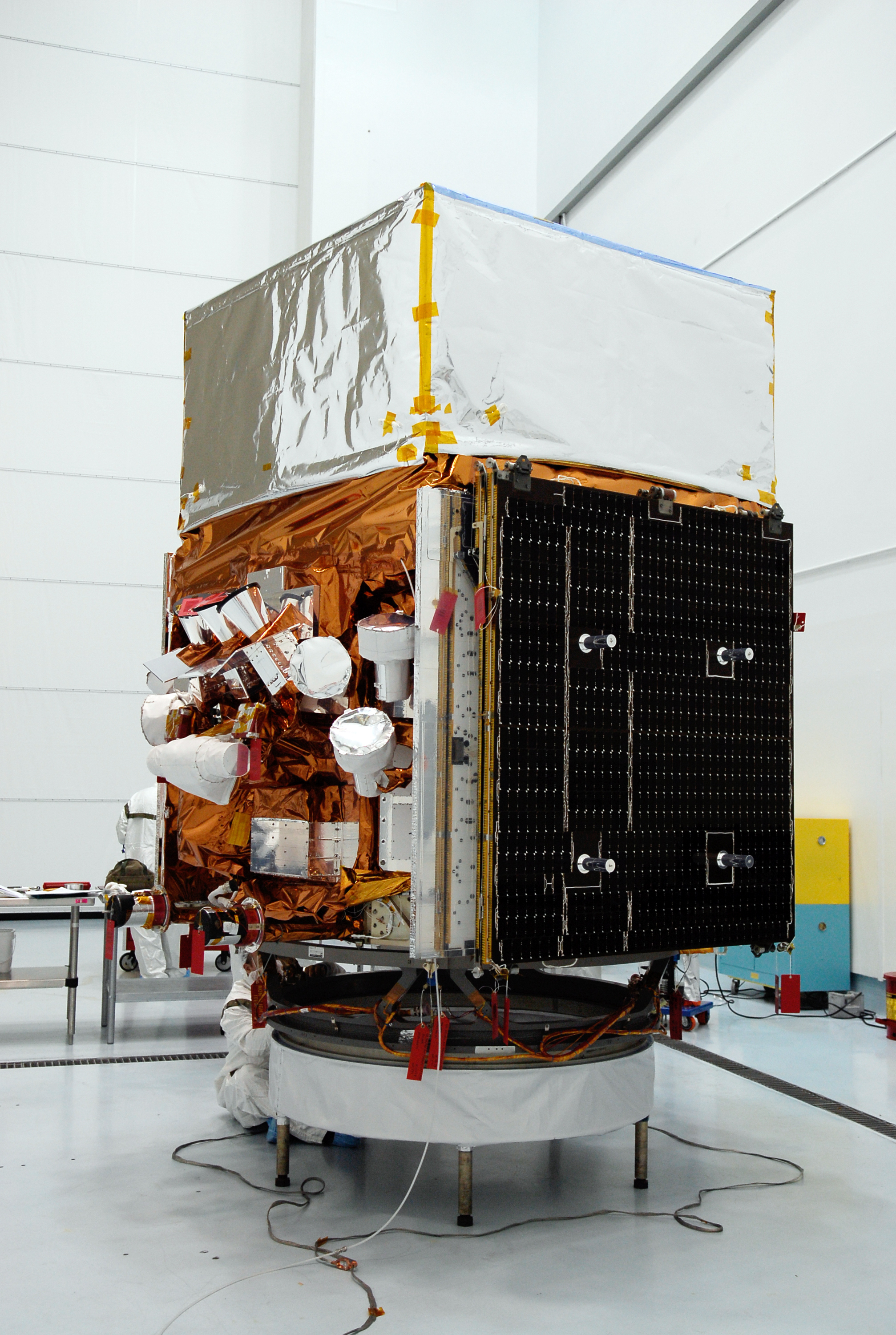
Fermi Gamma-ray Space Telescope

SLAC plays a primary role in the mission and operation of the Fermi Gamma-ray Space Telescope, launched in August 2008. The principal scientific objectives of this mission are:

- To understand the mechanisms of particle acceleration in AGNs, pulsars, and SNRs
- To resolve the gamma-ray sky: unidentified sources and diffuse emission
- To determine the high-energy behavior of gamma-ray bursts and transients
- To probe dark matter and fundamental physics

=== KIPAC ===
The Kavli Institute for Particle Astrophysics and Cosmology (KIPAC) is partially housed on the grounds of SLAC, in addition to its presence on the main Stanford campus.

=== PULSE ===
The Stanford PULSE Institute (PULSE) is a Stanford Independent Laboratory located in the Central Laboratory at SLAC. PULSE was created by Stanford in 2005 to help Stanford faculty and SLAC scientists develop ultrafast x-ray research at LCLS. PULSE research publications can be viewed here.

=== LCLS ===
The Linac Coherent Light Source (LCLS) is a free electron laser facility located at SLAC. The LCLS is partially a reconstruction of the last 1/3 of the original linear accelerator at SLAC, and can deliver extremely intense x-ray radiation for research in a number of areas. It achieved first lasing in April 2009.

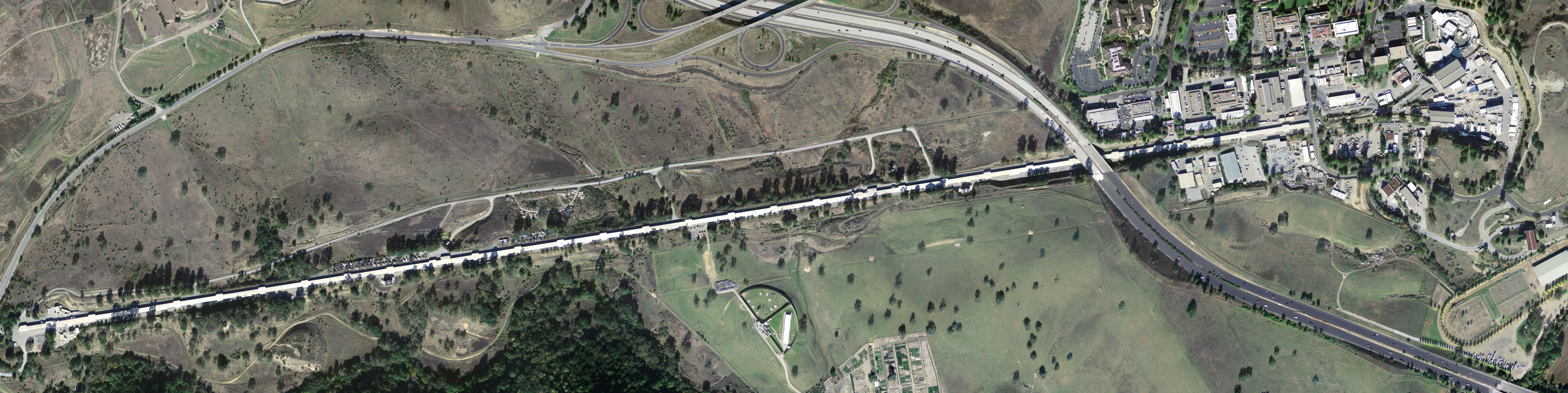
Aerial photo of the Stanford Linear Accelerator Center, showing the 3.2 km (2 mi) building housing the accelerator beamline, which passes under Interstate 280. The detector complex is visible to the east, on the right side.

The laser produces hard X-rays, 10^{9} times the relative brightness of traditional synchrotron sources and is the most powerful x-ray source in the world. LCLS enables a variety of new experiments and provides enhancements for existing experimental methods. X-rays take "snapshots" of objects at the atomic level before obliterating samples. The laser's wavelength, ranging from 6.2 to 0.13 nm (200 to 9500 electron volts (eV)) is similar to the width of an atom, providing extremely detailed information that was previously unattainable. Additionally, the laser is capable of capturing images with a "shutter speed" measured in femtoseconds, or million-billionths of a second, necessary because the intensity of the beam is often high enough so that the sample explodes on the femtosecond timescale.

=== LCLS-II ===
The LCLS-II project is to provide a major upgrade to LCLS by adding two new X-ray laser beams. The new system will utilize the 500 m (1,600 ft) of existing tunnel to add a new superconducting accelerator at 4 GeV and two new sets of undulators that will increase the available energy range of LCLS. The advancement from the discoveries using this new capabilities may include new drugs, next-generation computers, and new materials.

=== FACET ===
In 2012, the first two-thirds (~2 km) of the original SLAC LINAC were recommissioned for a new user facility, the Facility for Advanced Accelerator Experimental Tests (FACET). This facility was capable of delivering 20 GeV, 3 nC electron (and positron) beams with short bunch lengths and small spot sizes, ideal for beam-driven plasma acceleration studies. The facility ended operations in 2016 for the constructions of LCLS-II occupies the first third of the SLAC LINAC. The FACET-II project re-established electron beams in the middle third of the LINAC for the continuation of beam-driven plasma acceleration studies in 2021.

=== NLCTA ===
The Next Linear Collider Test Accelerator (NLCTA) is a 60–120 MeV high-brightness electron beam linear accelerator used for experiments on advanced beam manipulation and acceleration techniques. It is located at SLAC's end station B.

=== Theoretical Physics ===
SLAC also performs theoretical research in elementary particle physics, including in areas of quantum field theory, collider physics, astroparticle physics, and particle phenomenology.

== Other discoveries ==
- SLAC has also been instrumental in the development of the klystron, a high-power microwave amplification tube.
- There is active research on plasma acceleration with recent successes such as the doubling of the energy of 42 GeV electrons in a meter-scale accelerator.
- There was a Paleoparadoxia found at the SLAC site, and its skeleton can be seen at a small museum in the breezeway.
- The SSRL facility was used to reveal hidden text in the Archimedes Palimpsest. X-rays from the synchrotron radiation lightsource caused the iron in the original ink to glow, allowing the researchers to photograph the original document that a Christian monk had scrubbed off.

== Directors ==
The following persons served as director of SLAC:

No.	Image	Director	Term start	Term end	Refs.
1		Wolfgang Panofsky	1961	1984	
2		Burton Richter	1984	August 31, 1999	
3		Jonathan Dorfan	September 1, 1999	December 12, 2007	
acting		Persis Drell	September 9, 2007	December 12, 2007	
4		Persis Drell	December 12, 2007	October 31, 2012	
5		Chi-Chang Kao	November 1, 2012	February 3, 2023	
interim		Stephen Streiffer	February 4, 2023	October 1, 2023	
6		John Sarrao	October 2, 2023	present	

== See also ==
- Cyclotron – Type of particle accelerator
- Dipole magnet – Simplest type of magnet
- Electromagnetism – Fundamental interaction between charged particles
- List of particles
- List of United States college laboratories conducting basic defense research
- Particle beam – Stream of charged, or less frequently neutral particles
- Quadrupole magnet – Group of four magnets
- Spallation Neutron Source – Accelerator-based neutron source in Oak Ridge, Tennessee, US
