= Albert L. Latter =

American nuclear physicist (1921–1997)

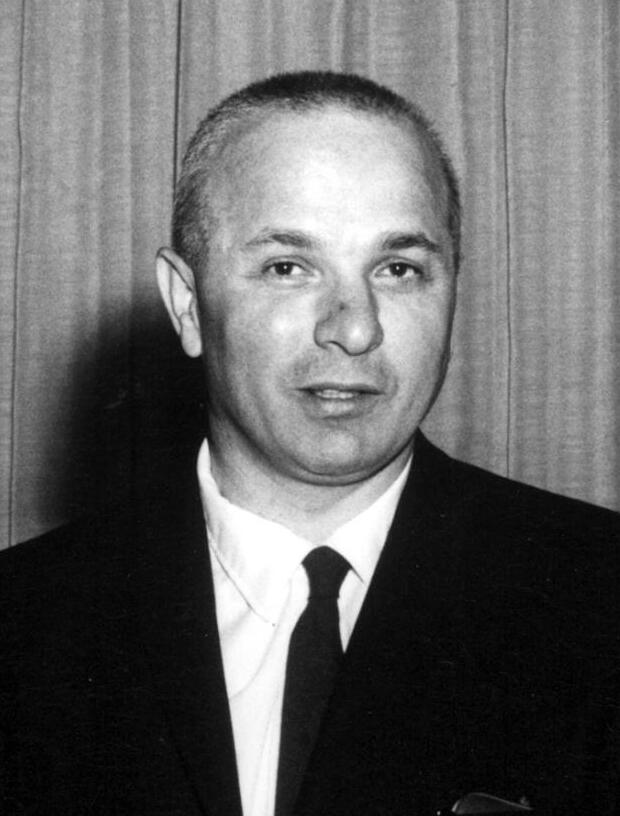
Latter in 1964

Albert Louis Latter (October 17, 1921, Kokomo, Indiana – June 8, 1997, Pacific Palisades, Los Angeles) was an American nuclear physicist and leading expert on nuclear weapons.

== Biography ==
Latter graduated from the University of California, Los Angeles (UCLA) with a bachelor's degree in mathematics and physics in 1941 and with a Ph.D. in physics in 1951. Immediately after receiving his Ph.D. he joined the Santa Monica headquarters of RAND Corporation, where for the next twenty years he worked on nuclear weapons.

In the 1950s Albert Latter and Edward Teller worked together on the United States Air Force Scientific Advisory Board, where Teller attended his first meeting as a member in early 1952 at the invitation of his old friend Theodore von Karman. Teller and Latter were the co-authors of the controversial book Our Nuclear Future: Facts, Dangers, and Opportunities, published in 1958 by Criterion Books.

An American delegate to the 1959 nuclear test ban negotiations in Geneva, Latter studied seismic detection, which helped lead to the U.S. approval of the Limited Test Ban Treaty of 1963.
He was the first American scientist to theorize that high-yield nuclear devices will emit a large fraction of their energy as high temperature X-rays, a discovery that demonstrated the vulnerability of offensive and defensive strategic missiles.

In 1960, Dr. Latter became head of the physics department at Rand, where the aspects of nuclear weapons he dealt with ranged from their design and efficiency to defensive steps against them. He also played a significant role in developing certain advanced missile warheads and in devising ways to detect underground nuclear tests.

Albert Latter's brother Richard Latter (1923–1999) was also a noteworthy physicist and they worked together at RAND.

In 1971 Albert Latter resigned from RAND and, together his brother Richard and most of RAND's physics department, founded in Marina del Rey the defense research company R&D Associates (RDA) which was acquired in 1983 by Logicon Inc., which became a subsidiary of Northrop Grumman in 1997. Albert Latter was the president and CEO of R&D Associates until his retirement in 1985.

He received the 1964 Ernest O. Lawrence Award from the Atomic Energy Commission "for contributions in the determination of the destructive effects as well as in the decoupling of nuclear explosions and in the design of nuclear weapons."

Upon his death Albert Latter was survived by his wife, two daughter, and three grandchildren.

== Selected publications ==
- Latter, A. L.; Latter, R. (1952). "A Phase Shift Analysis of Neutron-Deuteron Scattering". Physical Review. 86 (5): 727–730. Bibcode:1952PhRv...86..727L. doi:10.1103/PhysRev.86.727.
- Latter, A.; Latter, R. (1956). "Equation of State of Water on the Thomas‐Fermi Model". The Journal of Chemical Physics. 25 (5): 1016–1023. Bibcode:1956JChPh..25.1016L. doi:10.1063/1.1743090.
- Latter, A. L.; Martinelli, E. A.; Teller, E. (1959). "Seismic Scaling Law for Underground Explosions". Physics of Fluids. 2 (3): 280. Bibcode:1959PhFl....2..280L. doi:10.1063/1.1705923.
- Plesset, M. S.; Latter, A. L. (1960). "Transient Effects in the Distribution of Carbon-14 in Nature". Proceedings of the National Academy of Sciences of the United States of America. 46 (2): 232–241. Bibcode:1960PNAS...46..232P. doi:10.1073/pnas.46.2.232. PMC 222819. PMID 16590612.
- Latter, A. L.; Lelevier, R. E.; Martinelli, E. A.; McMillan, W. G. (1961). "A method of concealing underground nuclear explosions". Journal of Geophysical Research. 66 (3): 943–946. Bibcode:1961JGR....66..943L. doi:10.1029/JZ066i003p00943.
- Latter, A. L.; Martinelli, E. A.; Mathews, J.; McMillan, W. G. (1961). "The effect of plasticity on decoupling of underground explosions". Journal of Geophysical Research. 66 (9): 2929–2936. Bibcode:1961JGR....66.2929L. doi:10.1029/JZ066i009p02929. OSTI 4054285.
