= Richard Latter =

American physicist

Richard Latter (20 February 1923 – 2 December 1999) was a theoretical physicist, who was famous for his political involvement in the United States during the Cold War, where he warned against MIRVs developed in Soviet Russia, by which arms-reduction treaties could be evaded.

== Life ==
Richard Latter was born in Chicago in 1923. In World War II, he served in the US Navy. He studied physics graduated from the California Institute of Technology, where he graduated in 1942, and received a doctorate in theoretical physics in 1949.

After graduation, he started working for RAND in California, where he became head of the physics department in 1956. In 1960 his brother, physicist Albert L. Latter, took his place, and he joined the RAND Research Council.

In 1971, he founded RDA (R&D Associates) with other physicists (his brother among them).

Latter was married twice, and had three sons from his first marriage—one of them, Richard James Latter, died in 1990—and a daughter from his second marriage.

By the end of his life, he lived in McLean, Virginia, where he died in 1999 of lung cancer.

== Notable Achievements ==
In the early 1960s, Latter had the idea of Multiple Independently targetable Reentry Vehicles (MIRVs) which, as he later realized, was already thought of—and put into use—in Soviet Russia. By alerting the White House, the US soon developed its own MIRVs, and balance was retained.

He was a member of the US delegation to the Conference for the Discontinuance of Nuclear Weapons Tests on Geneva and a science adviser to the Strategic Arms Limitation Talks (SALT). Latter also helped work with Soviet scientists at the Geneva conference to develop what would later become a treaty against testing nuclear weapons in the atmosphere (1964).

== Publications ==
- Latter, Richard (1964-10-15). "Solutions of the Thomas—Fermi—Dirac Statistical Model of Atoms". The Journal of Chemical Physics. 41 (8). AIP Publishing: 2275–2279. Bibcode:1964JChPh..41.2275L. doi:10.1063/1.1726259. ISSN 0021-9606.
- Latter, Richard (1955). "Similarity Solution for a Spherical Shock Wave". Journal of Applied Physics. 26 (8). AIP Publishing: 954–960. Bibcode:1955JAP....26..954L. doi:10.1063/1.1722144. ISSN 0021-8979.
- Latter, Richard (1956). "Thomas‐Fermi Model of Compressed Atoms". The Journal of Chemical Physics. 24 (2). AIP Publishing: 280–292. Bibcode:1956JChPh..24..280L. doi:10.1063/1.1742464. ISSN 0021-9606.
