= Harvey M. Patt =

American physiologist, radiation biologist, and cell biologist

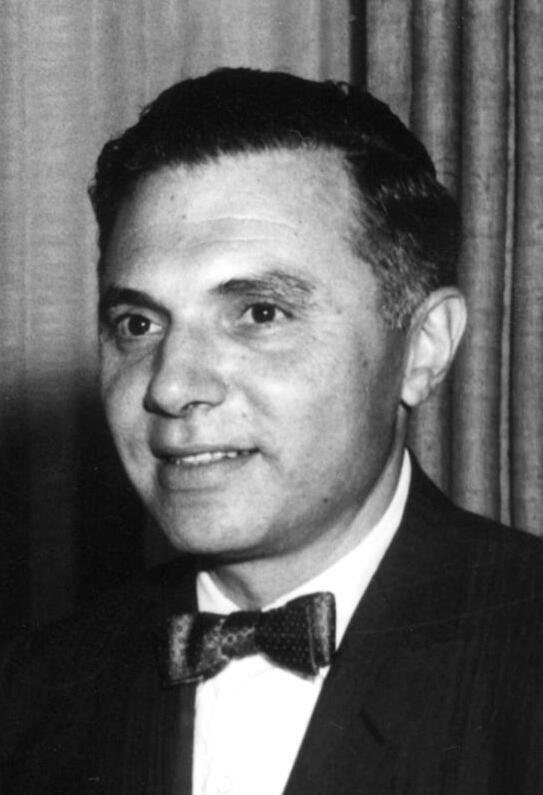
Patt in 1964

Harvey Milton Patt (August 2, 1918 – November 4, 1982) was an American physiologist, radiation biologist, and cell biologist, who made "important scientific contributions in cell cycle kinetics and tissue repopulation."

== Education and career ==
Patt received in 1942 his Ph.D. in physiology from the University of Chicago. His dissertation is titled The relation of a low blood calcium to parathyroid secretion. He was an instructor in physiology at the University of Chicago after serving for two years as a lieutenant J.G. in the United States Navy.

At Argonne National Laboratory, Patt became a staff member in 1946 and a senior physiologist in 1952. He was the executive secretary of the Oberlin Conference on Radiobiology, which was held from June 14 to June 18, 1950 and was sponsored by the National Research Council of the National Academy of Sciences. The conference dealt with "4 aspects of radiobiological interest, namely the physical, chemical, biochemical, and organismal, with the visible cellular effects included in the latter." He was an important pioneer of the field of radiobiology. As a member of the Radiation Research Society, he was the first treasurer, the ninth president, and an editorial board member of the journal Radiation Research, as well as the executive secretary of the First International Congress of Radiation Research; the congress was held in Burlington, Vermont from the 11th to the 15th of August, 1958.

At the University of California, San Francisco (UCSF), Patt was appointed in 1964 the director of the Laboratory of Radiobiology and a professor of radiobiology and experimental radiology. As the successor to Robert Spencer Stone (1895–1966), he developed the program with format still used at UCSF.

In 1964 Patt was awarded the Ernest Orlando Lawrence Award from the Atomic Energy Commission "for exceptionally high quality research in radiobiology, especially in the field of radiation protection and for his important contributions to the present understanding of the dynamics of white blood cells formation." In February 1964 at UCSF, Mortimer J. Elkind gave the inaugural Harvey M. Patt Memorial Lecture; after the lecture a plaque in memory of Patt was dedicated at UCSF's Laboratory of Radiobiology and Environmental Health.

== Selected publications ==
- Patt, H. M.; Luckhardt, A. B. "Relation of a low blood calcium to a parathyroid secretion". Endocrinology. 31: 384–392. doi:10.1210/endo-31-3-384. (Arno B. Luckhardt (1885–1957) was a professor of physiology at the University of Chicago.)
- Patt, H. M.; Swift, M. N.; Tyree, E. B.; John, E. S. (1947). "Adrenal Response to Total Body X-Radiation". American Journal of Physiology. Legacy Content. 150 (3): 480–487. doi:10.1152/ajplegacy.1947.150.3.480. hdl:2027/mdp.39015095101898. PMID 20265847. (Marguerite N. Swift was a physiologist who worked on the Manhattan Project. She was one of the seventy signers of the Szilárd petition.)
- Patt, Harvey M.; Swift, Marguerite N. (1948). "Influence of Temperature on the Response of Frogs to X Irradiation". American Journal of Physiology. Legacy Content. 155 (3): 388–393. doi:10.1152/ajplegacy.1948.155.3.388. PMID 18113178.
- Patt, H. M.; Tyree, E. B.; Straube, R. L.; Smith, D. E. (1949). "Cysteine Protection against X Irradiation". Science. 110 (2852): 213–214. Bibcode:1949Sci...110..213P. doi:10.1126/science.110.2852.213. PMID 17811258. (over 950 citations)
- Patt, H. M.; Straube, R. L.; Tyree, E. B.; Swift, M. N.; Smith, D. E. (1949). "Influence of Estrogens on the Acute X-Irradiation Syndrome". American Journal of Physiology. Legacy Content. 159 (2): 269–280. doi:10.1152/ajplegacy.1949.159.2.269. PMID 15393468.
- Patt, H. M.; Smith, D. E.; Tyree, E. B.; Straube, R. L. (1950). "Further Studies on Modification of Sensitivity to X-rays by Cysteine". Experimental Biology and Medicine. 73 (1): 18–21. doi:10.3181/00379727-73-17561. PMID 15409471. S2CID 9800298.
- Patt, Harvey M. (1953). "Protective Mechanisms in Ionizing Radiation Injury". Physiological Reviews. 33 (1): 35–76. doi:10.1152/physrev.1953.33.1.35. PMID 13013832.
- Patt, H. M.; Clark, J. W.; Vogle, H. H. (1953). "Comparative Protective Effect of Cysteine against Fast Neutron and Gamma Irradiation in Mice". Experimental Biology and Medicine. 84 (1): 189–193. doi:10.3181/00379727-84-20586. PMID 13120981. S2CID 13513498.
- Patt, Harvey M.; Blackford, Margaret E. (1954). "Quantitative studies of the growth response of the Krebs ascites tumor". Cancer Research. 14 (5): 391–396. PMID 13160969. 1954
- Patt, Harvey M.; Quastler, Henry (1963). "Radiation Effects on Cell Renewal and Related Systems". Physiological Reviews. 43 (3): 357–396. doi:10.1152/physrev.1963.43.3.357. PMID 13941891.
- Lala, Peeyush K.; Patt, Harvey M. (1966). "Cytokinetic Analysis of Tumor Growth". Proceedings of the National Academy of Sciences. 56 (6): 1735–1742. Bibcode:1966PNAS...56.1735L. doi:10.1073/pnas.56.6.1735. PMC 220164. PMID 16591413. (Peeyush Lala won the 2020 Henry Gray Award from the American Association for Anatomy.)
- Patt, H. M.; Maloney, M. A. (1972). "Bone Formation and Resorption as a Requirement for Marrow Development". Experimental Biology and Medicine. 140 (1): 205–207. doi:10.3181/00379727-140-36426. PMID 4555913. S2CID 41660190.
- Patt, H. M.; Maloney, M. A. (1975). "Bone marrow regeneration after local injury: A review". Experimental Hematology. 3 (2): 135–148. PMID 1095381.
- Patt, H. M.; Maloney, M. A.; Flannery, M. L. (1982). "Hematopoietic microenvironment transfer by stromal fibroblasts derived from bone marrow varying in cellularity". Experimental Hematology. 10 (9): 738–742. PMID 6129153.
