= Department of Applied Science (University of California, Davis) =

The Department of Applied Science was an academic department within the College of Engineering at the University of California, Davis. It was established in collaboration with the Lawrence Livermore National Laboratory. The department was established in the fall of 1963 and discontinued in 2011 due to College of Engineering budgetary issues.

== History ==
Teller's push for an educational institution associated with the LLNL was part of a general movement championed by Alvin M. Weinberg of Oak Ridge National Laboratory to use the United States Department of Energy National Laboratories to educate scientists, since at the time the department employed roughly 10% of the scientists in the United States. Teller first approached the University of California, Berkeley with his idea, but the faculty there opposed the idea because of the military focus of the program and the administration wasn't receptive. So he turned, reluctantly, to UC Davis instead. There Bainer and Emil M. Mrak, then chancellor of UCD, were more receptive to Teller's plan, although some faculty of the College of Engineering were unhappy with the idea of outsiders teaching their students.

Nicknamed "Teller Tech," the department was established in 1963 by Edward Teller on the grounds of the Lawrence Livermore National Laboratory (LLNL). It was the first graduate education program associated with one of the national laboratories. At the dedication of the new program, then president of the University of California, Clark Kerr, said that the school's "imaginative new curriculum" would allow the department to "build in a short time and at small cost a highly advanced training program of great significance to modern society."

The lab at first shared the facilities at Lawrence Livermore, although the students conducted non-classified research. Teller intended the DAS to educate advanced students in nuclear physics and other subjects applicable to defense industries. The Atomic Energy Commission, which administered LLNL, was worried about allowing DAS to use its facilities if foreign students would be enrolled. To meet this objection Teller agreed to limit the number of foreign students attending and to require prospective students to undergo FBI background checks.

Later, the lab was administered by the University of California for the Department of Energy and students were allowed to participate in classified, as well as unclassified projects. As part of the admissions process students were required to fill out a PSQ so that the Office of Personnel Management (OPM) could do a background check on them. Once their clearance was granted they were allowed to participate in classified research. Students were required to have US Citizenship to participate. Country of origin wasn't an issue.

Teller, who had been director of the Lawrence Livermore National Laboratory beginning in 1958, was named the first chairman of the Department of Applied Science. Its main location, built in 1976, was on the grounds of the LLNL in a building paid for with a matching grant of $1 million from the Hertz Foundation and thus called Hertz Hall.

The Department of Applied Science later became more centered at the UC Davis campus. Many of the department's faculty had joint appointments with LLNL or other national laboratories, so that students in the department had access to facilities in both locations.

The UC Davis College of Engineering closed the Department of Applied Science in July 2011 for budgetary reasons after 48 years of operation.

== Notable faculty ==
- Berni Alder - cofounder with Teller and National Medal of Science winner.
- Edward Teller
