= Social Sciences Division =

Social Sciences Division or Division of Social Sciences may refer to:

- Division of Social Sciences at the University of California, Santa Barbara College of Letters and Science
- Social Sciences Division at the University of Oxford
- Social Sciences Division at the University of Michigan College of Literature, Science, and the Arts
- Social Sciences Division at the University of Washington College of Arts and Sciences
