= Department of Physics (University of California, Santa Barbara) =

Department at the University of California, Santa Barbara

The Department of Physics is an academic department within the Division of Mathematical, Life, and Physical Sciences at the College of Letters and Science at the University of California, Santa Barbara. The department has 58 faculty members. It offers academic programs leading to the B.A., B.S., and Ph.D. degrees.

== Faculty Awards ==
As of 2014, the department counts three Nobel Prize winners among its faculty: David Gross (2004, Physics), Alan J. Heeger (2000, Chemistry), and Walter Kohn (1998, Chemistry). Physics Nobel Prize winners Herbert Kroemer (2000) and Shuji Nakamura (2014) are both professors of Electrical and Computer Engineering and Materials Departments at UCSB. The Physics Department's faculty includes 13 members of the National Academy of Sciences: Guenter Ahlers, Matthew Fisher, David Gross, James Hartle, Alan Heeger, Gary Horowitz, Joseph Incandela, Walter Kohn, James Langer, Joseph Polchinski, Douglas Scalapino, Boris Shraiman, and Michael Witherell. Heeger is also a member of the National Academy of Engineering. Guenter Ahlers, Matthew Fisher, David Gross, Gary Horowitz, Walter Kohn, James Langer, Joseph Polchinski, Douglas Scalapino, and Anthony Zee have all been elected to membership in the American Academy of Arts and Sciences. Joseph Incandela shared the 2012 Special Breakthrough Prize in Fundamental Physics with six other physicists for the discovery of the Higgs boson.

== Academics ==
=== Undergraduate academics ===
The standard program, which is in the College of Letters and Science (L&S), leads to either a B.A. or B.S. degree. The B.S. program is for those aiming for a career in physics, while the B.A. is a more flexible program allowing more courses from other areas. Within the B.S. program there are three possible schedules of courses - a standard track, an advanced track, and an honors track - leading to a degree in four years. These tracks include increasingly more electives and undergraduate research. UCSB conferred 66 bachelor's degrees in physics in 2013, which represents the sixth largest graduating physics class among U.S. universities.

=== Graduate academics ===
The graduate program was ranked fifth (or sixth, depending on which method used) among physics program in the 2011 study by the National Research Council. U.S. News & World Report ranked the graduate program tenth in the country across all subfields, third in Condensed Matter Physics, fifth in Quantum Physics, eighth in Elementary Particles/Field/String Theory, and ninth in Cosmology/Relativity/Gravity. The graduate program awarded a total of 20 Ph.D. degrees in 2013.

== Research Programs and Institutes ==
The faculty members conduct and supervise research in Astrophysics, Cosmology, Biophysics, Condensed Matter Physics, Gravitation, and Particle Physics. In 2011 The Academic Ranking of World Universities ranked the UCSB department eleventh in the world, ninth in the United States. In a ranking of physics departments by citations per faculty member, UCSB is first with 178 citations per faculty member.

Physics professor Lars Bildsten is Director of the Kavli Institute for Theoretical Physics (KITP) and all of its permanent members are also faculty of the Physics Department. Several faculty members carry out their research at the California NanoSystems Institute at UC Santa Barbara, or the Institute for Terahertz Science and Technology.

Four faculty members from the department lead a large UCSB research group working at the Large Hadron Collider using the Compact Muon Solenoid (CMS). UCSB Professor Joseph Incandela is the spokesperson for the CMS collaboration. On 4 July 2012, Incandela spoke on behalf of CMS, where the discovery of a previously unknown boson with mass 125.3 ± 0.6 GeV/c^{2} was announced.

== See also ==
- List of computational physics software
