= Elverhoj Art Colony =

New York Arts and Crafts movement artist colony

The Elverhoj Art Colony, originally known as the Elverhoj Colony of Artists and Craftsmen, was founded in 1912 in Milton-on-Hudson, New York, by Danish-American artists A. H. (Anders Hansen) Andersen and Johannes Morton. The name is an Anglization of the Danish word Elverhøj ("hill of the faries/elves"), which is the title of a fairytale by Hans Christian Andersen and of the first Danish national play ("Elves' Hill"), commissioned by King Frederick VI in 1828.

Early members of the colony included painter James Scott, printmaker Ralph M. Pearson, silversmith Joseph Popelka (who later worked for John Pontus Petterson at the Petterson Studio and Cellini Craft in Chicago), and textile artists Bessie Scott and Henrietta Scott Miller (sisters of James Scott).

The artists of the colony were best known for the jewelry and metalwork they produced; in addition, they offered instruction in painting, printmaking, bookbinding, weaving, jewelry, and metalwork. Many known examples of Elverhoj jewelry are stamped "ELVERHOJ".

In 1914, an article in the New York Times, "ART AT HOME AND ABROAD; Elverhoi School of Decorative Art Recalls William Morris's Band of English Rebels" highlighted the work of the Elverhoj colony, linking it firmly to the designer-craftsmen ideal of William Morris:

“The simplicity of the little colony, a more rugged and primitive simplicity than obtains at Old Lyme, the presence of workshops and tools, together with studios and easels, the evidences that the builders themselves have been to a degree the handiwork of the artists, a certain keen absorption on the materials of the crafts and their relation to technical processes, recall the fearless Morris group setting their stubborn faces against Industrial England.”

== Location ==
Founder A. H. Andersen chose to site the colony in Milton-on-Hudson, New York, perched directly above the Western Shore Railroad, on the shore of the Hudson River,. The 30-acre colony property included the 150 year old Captain Sherbourne Sears mansion and estate. The former studio of famed American landscape painter George Inness is nearby.

The colony's motto was to “live close to nature for inspiration,” and the members of the colony were housed accordingly in numerous rustic, wooden "cabin-studios" on the property. Patrons traveled to the colony from Poughkeepsie, Newburgh, New Paltz and New York City to enjoy theater performances, exhibitions, concerts, classes and lectures. Students who studied at the colony over the summers stayed in tents.

Notable neighbors and Arts and Crafts practitioners included typeface designer and co-founder of The Village Press, Frederic Goudy, and papermaker Dard Hunter (who built his own paper mill at the Gomez Mill House).

A few years after A. H. Andersen lost the Elverhoj property to foreclosure in 1934, the property was acquired by followers of the charismatic Black religious leader Father Divine. The art colony property became one of Father Divine's most active "Heavens" until it was sold in 1947. The former art colony site is now privately owned.

== History ==
The original eight members of the colony came from the Midwest, though Andersen and Morton were Danish immigrants. Most of the original members of the colony – Andersen, Morton, Popelka, and the Scotts – left Racine, Wisconsin to begin their colony in Milton, New York.

=== Education ===
Andersen, Popelka, Ralph M. Pearson and James Scott each studied at the Art Institute of Chicago. Morton graduated from the Royal Danish Academy of Fine Arts, Copenhagen before leaving Denmark for Racine, Wisconsin. Morton left the Elverhoj colony in 1917 to begin a nearly 40-year career in craft restoration with the Rambusch Decorating Company in New York City.

=== Awards and recognition ===
The artists of the colony were exhibiting members of the Society of Arts and Crafts of Boston, The National Society of Craftsmen (NYC), and the Art Students League of New York. Pearson and Morton were president and vice president of the Chicago Society of Etchers.

The colony exhibited their jewelry in Chicago – in 1912, at the O'Brien Galleries in Chicago, where they exhibited their Flora Americana jewelry collection and in 1914 in the Exhibition of Industrial Art at the Art Institute of Chicago.

In 1916, the Elverhoj was profiled in Gustav Stickley's The Craftsman magazine, by Hanna Astrup Larsen, who affirmed the colony's expectation that members would be as well-versed in the arts as they were skilled in handcraft. Larsen described the men and women of the colony as "a group of earnest workers [...] striving to develop an American school of decorative art." They applied "the fineness of Scandinavian craftsmanship" toward the colony's goal “to develop American materials and designs founded on American flora.”

That same year, the colony earned a gold medal for their silver and jewelry at the Panama Pacific Exposition in San Francisco.

The Elverhoj Colony was one of three Arts and Crafts movement colonies visited by English Arts & Crafts luminary Charles Robert Ashbee when he traveled to America in 1915 (the others were Byrdcliffe Colony in Woodstock, New York and Rose Valley near Philadelphia, Pennsylvania).

=== Associated artists ===
Bookbinder Sterling Lord, who went on to co-found The Oakwood Binders (of Pittsfield, Massachusetts), was also affiliated with the colony during its early years. Other associated artists include Pauline Fjelde (who taught tapestry weaving during the early years of the colony's annual summer school), David Ericson (an instructor of painting), and metalsmith Clyde P. Miller (who married member Henrietta Scott in 1925 a few years after joining the colony).

Members of the Elverhoj colony created metal frames for a collection of Danish artist Johan Waldemar de Rehling Quistgaard's miniature paintings, exhibited in 1915 at Vassar College's Taylor Hall and at the Hatch Gallery in Cleveland, Ohio.

=== Poughkeepsie and Vassar College ===
The Elverhoj Colony benefitted from the patronage of Vassar students and faculty. Early Vassar patrons of the colony included President Henry Noble MacCracken, art historian and professor Oliver Samuel Tonks, and history professor Lucy Maynard Salmon. Vassar students routinely visited the colony in Milton and studied with the colony artists. The Vassar Athletics Association even reserved a cabin at the Elverhoj colony for use by Vassar students.

The Peacock Shop in Poughkeepsie exhibited and sold Elverhoj crafts; when it closed, A. H. Andersen opened The Elverhoj Art Shop on Cannon Street. A. H. Andersen and the members of the colony designed and sold class rings to the students of Vassar College. A collection of Ralph M. Pearson's bookplates was acquired by Adelaide Underhill for the Vassar College Library.

Colony members, sisters Bessie and Henrietta Scott studied and taught tapestry and art weaving at the Elverhoj Colony. Both sisters later went on to run the arts and crafts studios in Vassar College's Blodgett Hall from 1929 to 1941.

=== Elverhoj Theater ===
In the mid-1920s, as the arts and crafts movement had waned, the colony began to turn its focus toward theater. The Elverhoj Theater drew Broadway performers and at the end of that decade, the colony expanded by adding a Moorish-style dining terrace to the original Sears building.

=== Foreclosure, bankruptcy and public auction ===
While several factors contributed to the demise of the Elverhoj Colony, the Great Depression dealt the final blow.

In 1934, a Poughkeepsie bank initiated foreclosure proceedings against Andersen's mortgage. Soon after, Andersen declared bankruptcy and finally, in late September 1937, the public auction of "the contents of the Studio and Gift Shop and the Museum, formerly known as The Elverhoj Art Collection, on the premises at Milton, N. Y.” was held. By November 1937, speculation that followers of Father Divine were purchasing the former Elverhoj property appeared in local newspapers. The property was acquired by followers of Father Divine in 1938.

Colony founder A. H. Andersen died in October 1944 and is buried in the Cedar Hill Cemetery and Mausoleum in nearby Newburgh, New York.
