= Mark Bowick =

American physicist (born 1957)

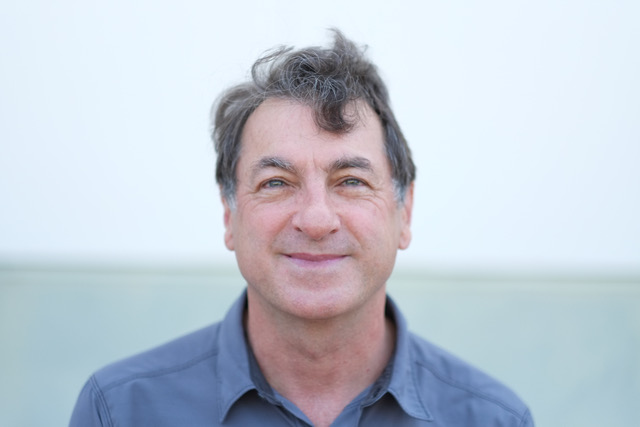
- Bowick in 2018
- Born: Mark John Bowick; 1957 (age 68–69); Rotorua, New Zealand
- Citizenship: U.S. and New Zealand
- Education: University of Canterbury (BSc); Caltech (MSc, PhD)
- Known for: Condensed Matter Theory and High Energy Theoretical Physics
- Awards: Gravity Research Foundation Essay Competition (1986); APS Fellow (2004); AAAS Fellow (2022)
- Scientific career
- Institutions: University of California, Santa Barbara; Syracuse University; MIT; Yale University
- Thesis: Radiative Mass Structure in Unified Models and Fermions in the Desert (1983)
- Doctoral advisor: Pierre Ramond
- Website: www.kitp.ucsb.edu/bowick

Mark John Bowick (born 1957) is a theoretical physicist in condensed matter theory and high energy physics. He is the deputy director of the Kavli Institute for Theoretical Physics at the University of California, Santa Barbara, and a Distinguished Professor of Physics in UCSB's Physics Department.

== Early life and education ==
Bowick was born in Rotorua, New Zealand, and earned his bachelor's degree, B.Sc. (Hons.), at the University of Canterbury in Christchurch. In 1983, he received his Ph.D. in theoretical physics from the California Institute of Technology, where he held an Earle C. Anthony Graduate Fellowship.

== Professional career ==
Bowick then spent three years at Yale University as the research associate of their Sloane Physics Lab's "Particle Theory Group," followed by a two-year postdoctoral position at the Center for Theoretical Physics, at MIT.

He was awarded first prize in the 1986 Gravity Research Foundation Essay Competition. In 1987, he joined the faculty of the physics department at Syracuse University, where he was granted an Outstanding Junior Investigator award, from the United States Department of Energy, for the years 1987 to 1994. At Syracuse, Bowick served as assistant and associate professor from 1987 to 1998, was promoted to full professor of physics in 1998, and went on to become director of the Soft Matter Program from 2011 to 2016.

In August 2016, the Kavli Institute for Theoretical Physics, at the University of California, Santa Barbara, invited Bowick to join as deputy director and visiting distinguished professor of physics.

== Research ==
Bowick's research interests include symmetry breaking, the interplay of order and geometry, topological defects, building blocks for supramolecular self-assembly, membrane statistical mechanics, shaped structures, and common themes in condensed matter and particle physics.

Since 2002, his career has been split between high-energy physics and condensed matter physics, with ongoing research support by the National Science Foundation.

== Honors and awards ==
- First prize in the Gravity Research Foundation Essay Competition (1986)
- Outstanding Junior Investigator, United States Department of Energy (1987–1994)
- Fellow of the American Physical Society, Division of Condensed Matter Physics (elected 2004)
- Fellow of the American Association for the Advancement of Science (elected 2022).

Syracuse honored Bowick with two commendations: the Chancellor's Citation for Exceptional Academic Achievement in 2006, and the William Wasserstrom Prize for Excellence in Graduate Teaching and Advising in 2009. He was also named the Joel Dorman Steele Professor of Physics in 2013.

== Personal life ==
Bowick is married to theoretical physicist M. Cristina Marchetti. They have two adult children.

In 2016, while director of Syracuse University's Soft Matter Program, Bowick commissioned composer Andrew Waggoner to write music for their Active And Smart Matter Conference: A New Frontier for Science & Engineering. The world premiere of this eclectic composition, entitled Hexacorda Mollia, was performed by the JACK Quartet on June 22, 2016.

== Selected publications ==
- Bowick, MJ and LCR Wijewardhana, Superstrings at High Temperature, Physical Review Letters 54 (23), 2485 (1985).
- Bowick, MJ, and TW Appelquist, D Karabali, LCR Wijewardhana, Spontaneous chiral-symmetry breaking in three-dimensional QED, Physical Review D 33 (12), 3704 (1986).
- Bowick, MJ, and L Chandar, EA Schiff, AM Srivastava, The Cosmological Kibble Mechanism in the Laboratory – String Formation in Liquid-Crystals, Science 263 (5149), 943–944 (1994).
- Bowick, MJ and A Travesset, The statistical mechanics of membranes, Physics Reports 344 (4-6), 255–308 (2001).
- Bowick, MJ, and AR Bausch, A Cacciuto, AD Dinsmore, MF Hsu, DR Nelson, ... Grain boundary scars and spherical crystallography, Science 299 (5613), 1716–1718 (2003).
- Bowick, MJ and L Giomi, Two-Dimensional Matter: Order, Curvature and Defects, Advances in Physics 58 (5), 449–563 (2009).
- Bowick MJ, and L Giomi, X Ma, MC Marchetti, Defect annihilation and proliferation in active nematics, Physical Review Letters 110 (22), 228101 (2013).
- Bowick, MJ, and FC Keber, E Loiseau, T Sanchez, SJ DeCamp, L Giomi, ... Topology and dynamics of active nematic vesicles, Science 345 (6201), 1135–1139 (2014).
