= Hanna Astrup Larsen =

Norwegian-American writer, editor and translator

Hanna Astrup Larsen (Decorah, Iowa, 1873 – Elmsford, New York, 1945) was a Norwegian-American writer, literary editor, and translator.

Larsen is best known from her editing roles with the American-Scandinavian Review (where she was literary editor from 1913 until 1921, when she was appointed editor). In 1921, Larsen was also appointed as the literary secretary of The American Scandinavian Foundation; in this role, she edited over 70 books published by that foundation.

Book cover for Knut Hamsun by Hanna Astrup Larsen

== Biography ==
Larsen was born in Decorah, Iowa, on September 1, 1873, died in Elmsford, New York, on December 3, 1945, and is buried in Lutheran Cemetery in Decorah, Iowa.

Hanna Astrup Larsen's father, Peter Laurentius Larsen, was a notable Norwegian Lutheran educator who became the founding president of Luther College.

=== Career ===
Hanna Astrup Larsen's early career began with editing roles at a number of Scandinavian-American newspapers, including the Norwegian language Amerika (Madison, Wisconsin) and the Swedish/English language Pacific Posten (San Francisco, California). Larsen then became special contributor to the San Francisco Chronicle and The San Francisco Call.

From 1908 to 1912, Larsen was a contributing writer for newspapers and magazines in New York (including Gustav Stickley's The Craftsman, where she published articles featuring Swedish painter Anna Boberg and the Elverhoj art colony in upstate New York). Larsen would later write articles for The New York Times.

Larsen was the author of Knut Hamsun (Alfred A. Knopf, 1922), a biography of the Norwegian writer Knut Hamsun; she also wrote Selma Lagerlöf (Doubleday, Doran & Company, Inc., 1936), a biography of the Swedish author; in 1909, Lagerlöf was the first woman to receive the Nobel Prize in Literature.

Larsen was the editor of a number of Scandinavian-language story collections, including Norway's Best Stories (W. W. Norton & Co., 1928), Sweden's Best Stories (W. W. Norton & Co., 1928), and Denmark's Best Stories (W. W. Norton & Co., 1928).

Larsen translated a number of Danish-language story collections and books, which were republished in the United States, including Jens Peter Jacobsen's Marie Grubbe (published in English in 1917) and Niels Lyhne (published in English in 1919) and Twelve Stories by Steen Steensen Blicher.

=== Recognition ===
Hanna Astrup Larsen was acknowledged to be "the first female editor-in-chief of a Norwegian language paper in America" when she was hired by Olaf Tveitmoe, publisher of San Francisco-based, newspaper Pacific Posten.

=== Awards ===
In the 1930s, Hanna Astrup Larsen received a number of international honors, including the Swedish Vasa Medal in 1931, the Norwegian Distinguished Service Medal in 1933, and the Royal Danish Medal of Merit in 1937.

== Works by Larsen ==
- Larsen, Hanna Astrup (1922). Knut Hamsun. New York: Alfred A. Knopf.
- Larsen, Hanna Astrup (1936). Selma Lagerlöf. Garden City, N.Y.: Doubleday, Doran & Company, Inc.
- Publications for Hanna Astrup Larsen, as listed in National union catalog, pre-1956 imprints (via HathiTrust)
- Larsen, Hanna Astrup “Anna Boberg: The Sea Painter of the North,” Craftsman 23, no. 4 (January 1913): 439–448.
