= Amalie Frischknecht =

American theoretical polymer physicist

Amalie L. Frischknecht
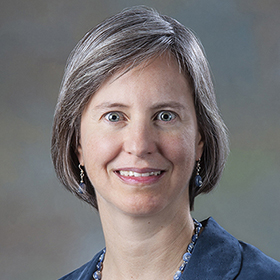
- Education: Pomona College; University of California, Santa Barbara
- Scientific career
- Workplaces: ExxonMobil; Sandia National Laboratories
- Thesis: Stability of Domains in Phase-Separating Binary Fluids in Shear Flow (1998)
- Doctoral advisor: James S. Langer

Amalie L. Frischknecht is an American theoretical polymer physicist at Sandia National Laboratories in Albuquerque, New Mexico. She was elected a fellow of the American Physical Society (APS) in 2012 for "her outstanding contributions to the theory of ionomers and nanocomposites including the development and application of density functional theory to polymers". Her research focuses on understanding the structure, phase behavior, and self-assembly of polymer systems, such as complex fluids polymer nanocomposites, lipid bilayer assemblies, and ionomers.

== Education ==
Frischknecht graduated from Pomona College in Claremont, California, with a Bachelor of Arts (B.A.) in physics and mathematics in 1992. She moved to University of California, Santa Barbara (UCSB) to her graduate studies, where she received a Ph.D. in physics in 1998. At UCSB, she worked under the supervision of James S. Langer. Frischknecht research thesis was on phase-separation of binary fluids in shear flow.

== Career and research ==
After graduating with her PhD, Frischknecht went to work at ExxonMobil Research & Engineering Co. as a postdoctoral fellow. She stayed there from 1998 until 2000 and worked on polymer rheology with Scott Milner, who is now a professor of physics at Pennsylvania State University. They investigated the dynamics of polymer melts made star-shaped polymers, which are a branched polymer in which several chains are linked together via a central core. They also studied diffusion of linear polymers.

In 2000, Frischknecht moved to Sandia National Laboratories, working first as a postdoctoral fellow and then becoming a permanent member of staff. To understand the behavior of polymers, she relies mostly on molecular modeling techniques like density functional theory and molecular dynamics simulations. Notable works include simulations of ionic polymers (polymers that contain ions that are chemically bound to their structure) to find their structures that they form. She has also studied the rheology of polymer-nanoparticle blends, finding that when the blend is placed on a substrate a first-order phase transition occurs that expels the polymer from the surface, causing the particles to form a monolayer.

== Committees ==
Frischknecht serves as the Chair of the Division of Polymer Physics (DPOLY) at the American Physical Society (APS), a position that runs from 2020 to 2021. She previously served as Chair-Elect from 2019 to 2020, and as a member at large for DPOLY from 2013 to 2015. She chaired the 2018 Gordon Research Conference (GRC) on Polymer Physics titled "New Developments in Hierarchical Structure and Dynamics of Polymers." The theme of the conference was new experimental, simulation, and theoretical developments in polymer physics.

== Notable publications ==
- "Amalie L. Frischknecht | Find Expertise". www.lanl.gov.
- A. L. Frischknecht and K. I. Winey, "The Evolution of Acidic and Ionic Aggregates in Ionomers during Microsecond Simulations," J. Chem. Phys. 150, 064901 (2019).
- E. G. Sorte, B. A. Paren, C. G. Rodriquez, C. Fujimoto, C. Poirier, L. J. Abbott, N. A. Lynd, K. I. Winey, A. L. Frischknecht, and T. M. Alam, "Impact of Hydration and Sulfonation on the Morphology and Ionic Conductivity of Sulfonated Poly(phenylene) Proton Exchange Membranes," Macromolecules 52, 857-876 (2019).
- J. P. Koski and A. L. Frischknecht, "Fluctuation Effects on the Brush Structure of Mixed Brush Nanoparticles in Solution," ACS Nano 12, 1664 (2018).
- L. J. Abbott and A. L. Frischknecht, "Nanoscale Structure and Morphology of Sulfonated Polyphenylenes via Atomistic Simulations," Macromolecules 50, 1184 (2017).
- L. R. Middleton, J. D. Tarver, J. Cordaro, M. Tyagi, C. L. Soles, A. L. Frischknecht, and K. I. Winey, "Heterogeneous Chain Dynamics and Aggregate Lifetimes in Precise Acid-Containing Polyethylenes: Experiment and Simulations," Macromolecules 49, 9176-9185 (2016) [featured on front cover].
- K. M. Salerno, A. L. Frischknecht, and M. J. Stevens, "Charged nanoparticle attraction in multivalent salt solution: A classical-fluids density functional theory and molecular dynamics study," J. Phys. Chem. B 120, 5927-5937 (2016).
- C. L. Ting, R. J. Composto, and A. L. Frischknecht, "Orientational control of polymer grafted nanorods," Macromolecules 49, 1111-1119 (2016).
- C. K. Simocko, A. L. Frischknecht, and D. L. Huber, "Phase behavior of ternary polymer brushes," ACS Macro Lett. 5, 149-153 (2016).
- C. F. Buitrago, D. S. Bolintineanu, M. E. Seitz, K. L. Opper, K. B. Wagener, M. J. Stevens, A. L. Frischknecht, and K. I. Winey, "Direct comparisons of X-ray scattering and atomistic molecular dynamics simulations for precise acid copolymers and ionomers," Macromolecules 48, 1210 (2015).
- C. L. Ting, M. J. Stevens, and A. L. Frischknecht, "Structure and dynamics of coarse-grained ionomer melts in an external electric field," Macromolecules 48, 809 (2015).

See all publications on google scholar: https://scholar.google.com/citations?user=z1YWynYAAAAJ&hl=en
