= Thompson Memorial Library =

Main library at Vassar College

Coordinates: 41.687579°N 73.897924°W

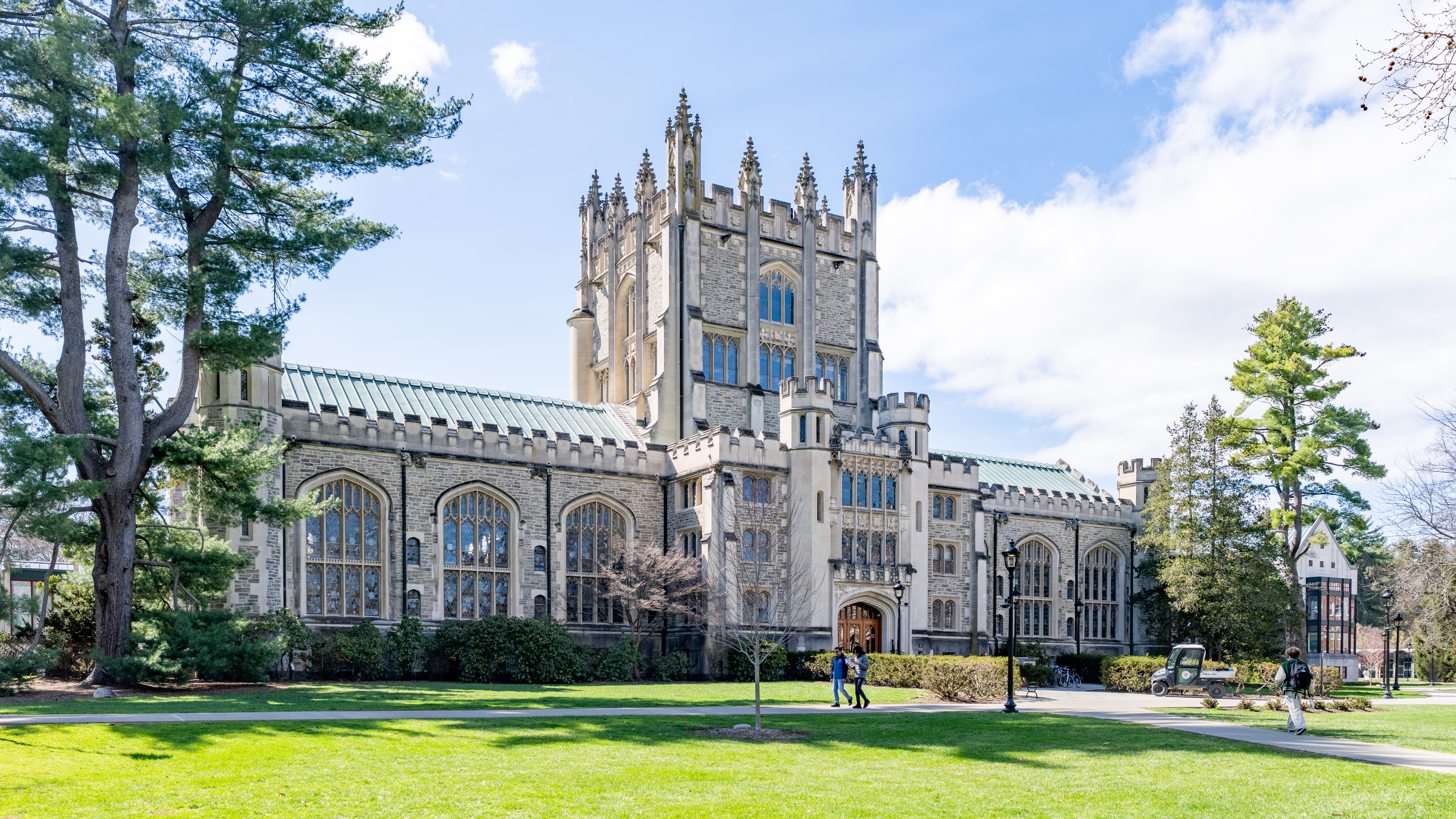
Vassar's Thompson Library

The Frederick Ferris Thompson Memorial Library is the main library building at Vassar College in Poughkeepsie, New York.

== Background ==
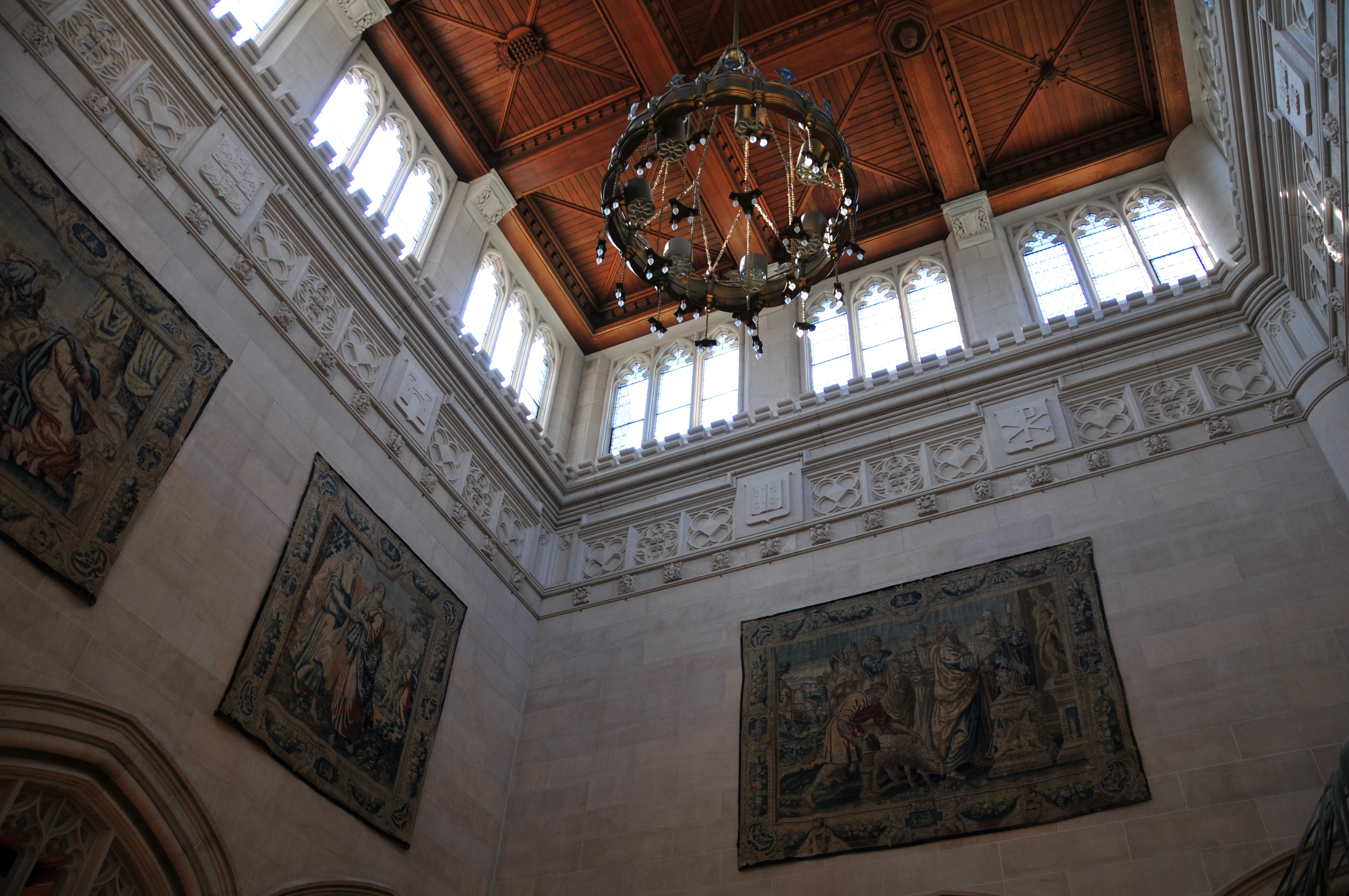
Central Tower and Tapestries

When Vassar opened in 1865, the library was a mere single room in Main with a collection of only three thousand books. In 1893 Frederick Ferris Thompson, a Vassar trustee, gave the college an extension to Main hall that served as a library until the new Thompson building was completed in 1905 by Mary Clark Thompson as a memorial for her husband. Mrs. Thompson's continuing generosity enabled the library to be enlarged in 1918, and in 1924 her bequest to the college became an endowment for its support.

== Architecture ==
Architecturally, the style of the building is Perpendicular Gothic, and is constructed from Germantown stone with Indiana limestone trimming. The general plan of the building, as designed by Francis R. Allen and his associate Charles Collens, is three wings built about a central tower. Rising with buttressed walls, the tower is crowned with battlements and pinnacles. Flanking the entrance, below the ceiling windows in the central hall, is a stone frieze of college and university seals from (left to right): the "Lux et Veritas" of Yale, Vassar, Wellesley, Bryn Mawr, Smith, and the "Veritas" of Harvard. Below the gargoyles on the bottom corners of the tower (above the doors) are the seals of Oxford and Cambridge. Yale, Harvard, Oxford, and Cambridge all started as male institutions and their seals are on the edges of the library tower, representing pillars. The other schools started off as female institutions and their seals are in the middle of the tower. The architect of the library wanted to remind Vassar women that their education was on par with the male pillars of education. Below the frieze of seals in the central hall hang five seventeenth-century Flemish Gobelin tapestries portraying Apuleius' romance of Cupid and Psyche.

=== Additions ===
- In 1937 funds derived chiefly from her bequest built the addition to the south which leads to Taylor Hall. That part of the structure is known as the Van Ingen Art Library, in memory of Henry Van Ingen, professor of art at Vassar from 1865 to 1898. The other addition was named after Vassar librarian, Adelaide Underhill.
- From 1961 to 1964, the interior of the Thompson Library was extensively modernized, through the generosity of another former trustee, the late Elizabeth Stillman Williams, of the Class of 1927.

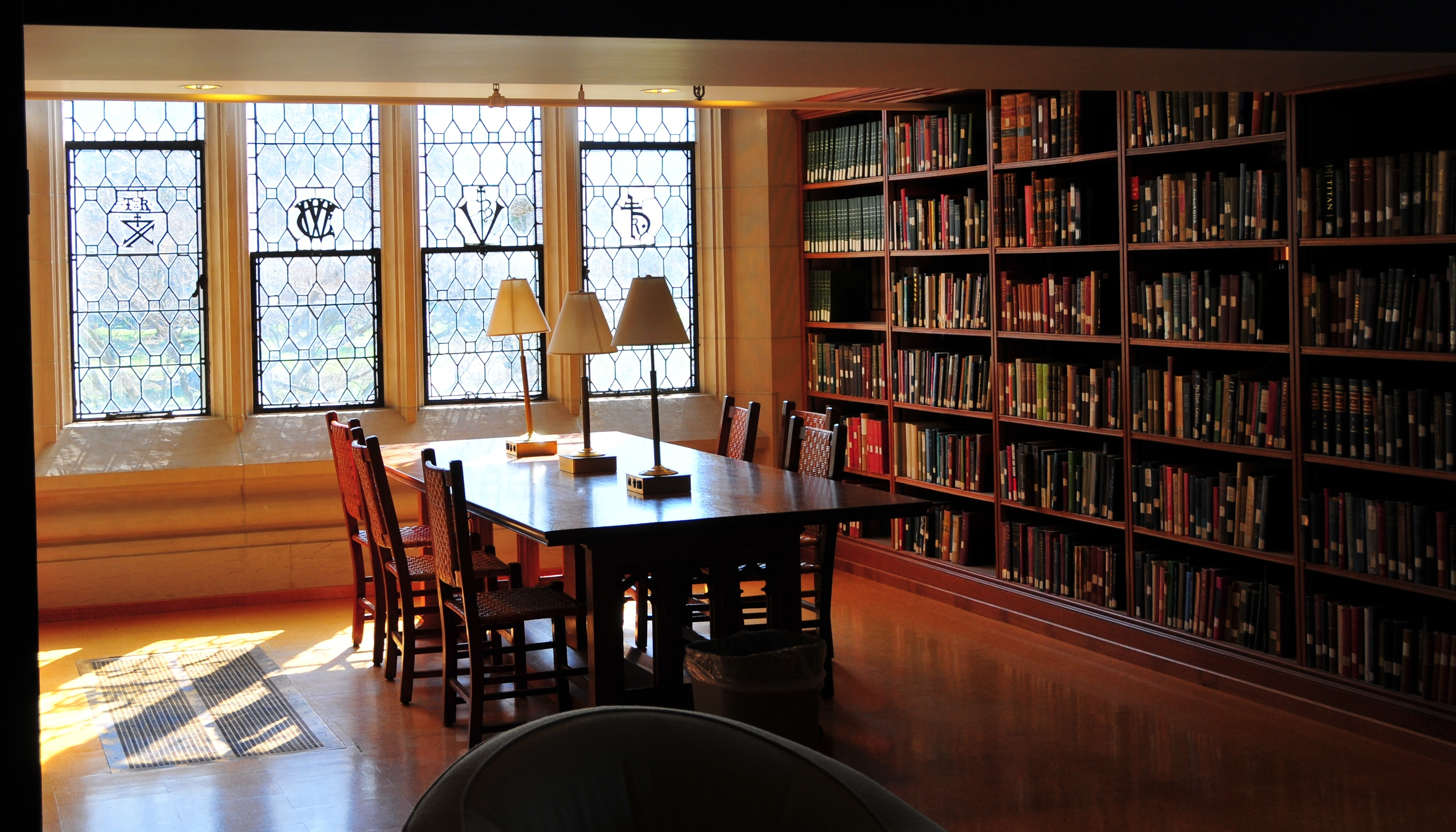
Study area and stacks

- In 2001, the Martha Rivers and E. Bronson Ingram Library was built. A principal feature of this new addition is the Catherine Pelton Durrell Archives and Special Collections which houses the Francis Fitz Randolph Rare Book Room as well as exhibit, storage, teaching and reading areas. Ingram Library also includes Reserve Services, studies for faculty members, the periodical collections, the Class of 1951 Reading Room, the library classroom and staff offices. A major renovation to Thompson Library was also completed in 2001.

=== Cornaro Window ===
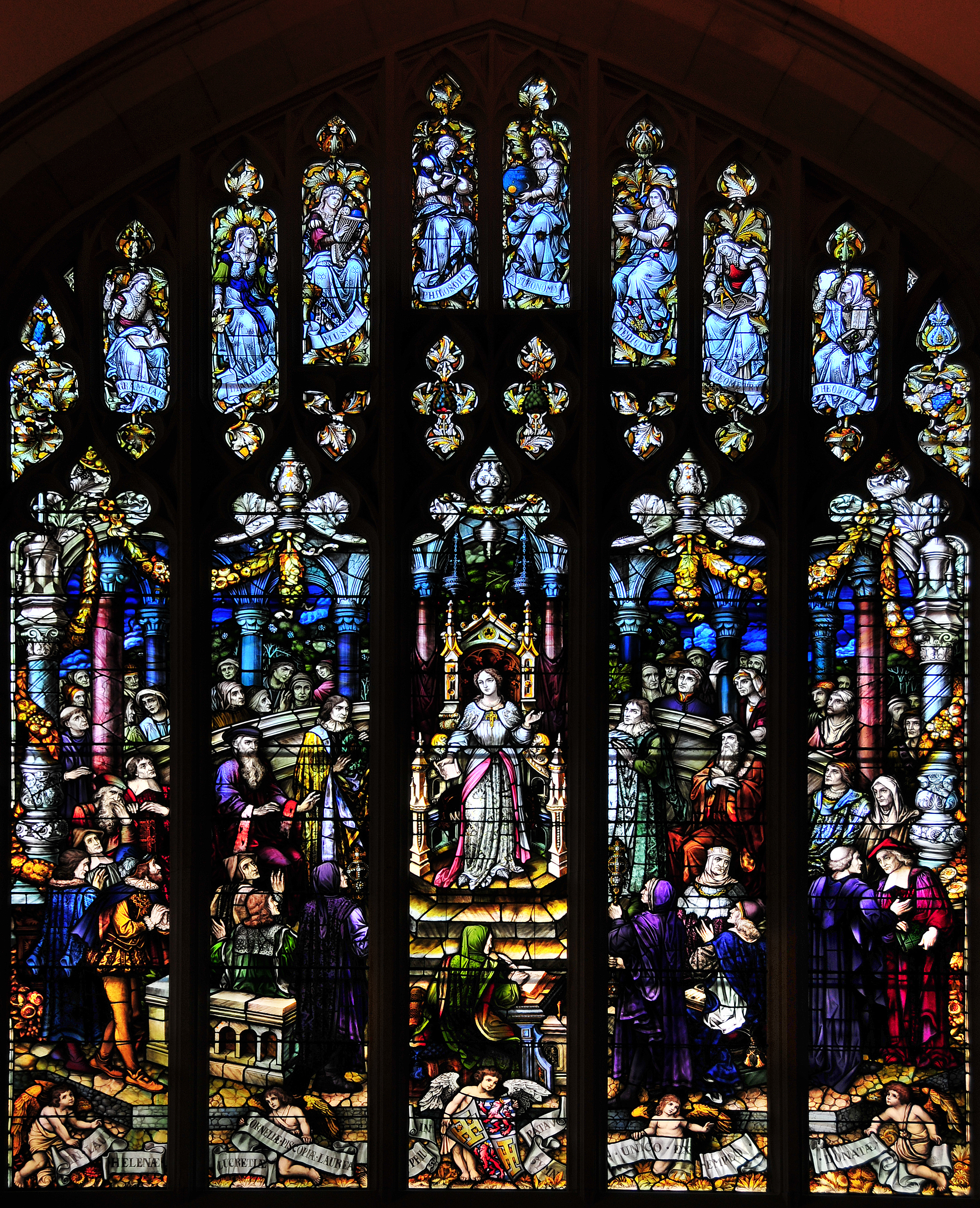
The Cornaro Window

In the West Wing is the Cornaro Stained-Glass Window commissioned for the library and installed in 1906. The image shows Elena Cornaro Piscopia, a young Venetian who had previously been denied the Doctor of Theology degree as a woman, receiving her doctorate in philosophy from the University of Padua. She is thought to be the first woman to earn this degree in European history.

- The window comes from the studios of Messrs. John Hardman & Company of Birmingham, England, and of the Church Glass and Decorating Company of New York, their U.S. representatives.
- The window was designed by Dunstan Powell, grandson of Augustus Welby Northmore Pugin, the Victorian era church architect. The much debated question of whose idea it was to choose the subject has not been resolved.

The west wing of the Thompson Library, featuring the Cornaro Window

- The lights in the tracery represent Grammar, Dialectics, Music, Philosophy, Astronomy, Medicine, Geometry and Theology.
- At the bottom are cherubim holding scrolls upon which are written in Latin: "In Laud Helenae Lucretia Cornelia Piscopiae Lauria Philo In Patav Gymn Unico Ex-Emplo Donatae"
- Lady Elena's dress is Rose and Grey, the original colors of Vassar College.

== Collections ==
The library collection today - which actually encompasses seven total libraries at Vassar - contains about a million volumes and 7,500 serial, periodical and newspaper titles, as well as an extensive collection of microfilm and microfiche.

=== Archives and Special Collections Library ===
Archives & Special Collections holds the rare book, manuscript, and archival collections of the college. It collects, preserves, and makes available rare and unique collections, and also engages in teaching and outreach activities. It is located on the ground floor of the Ingram Addition (north end) of the Library.

Among the rare books, particular strengths exist in women's history, first editions of English and American literary and historical works, examples of fine printing, collections of courtesy and cookbooks, children's books, and rare maps and atlases. Important manuscript holdings document topics such as literature, politics, and women’s history.

=== Government Documents Collection ===
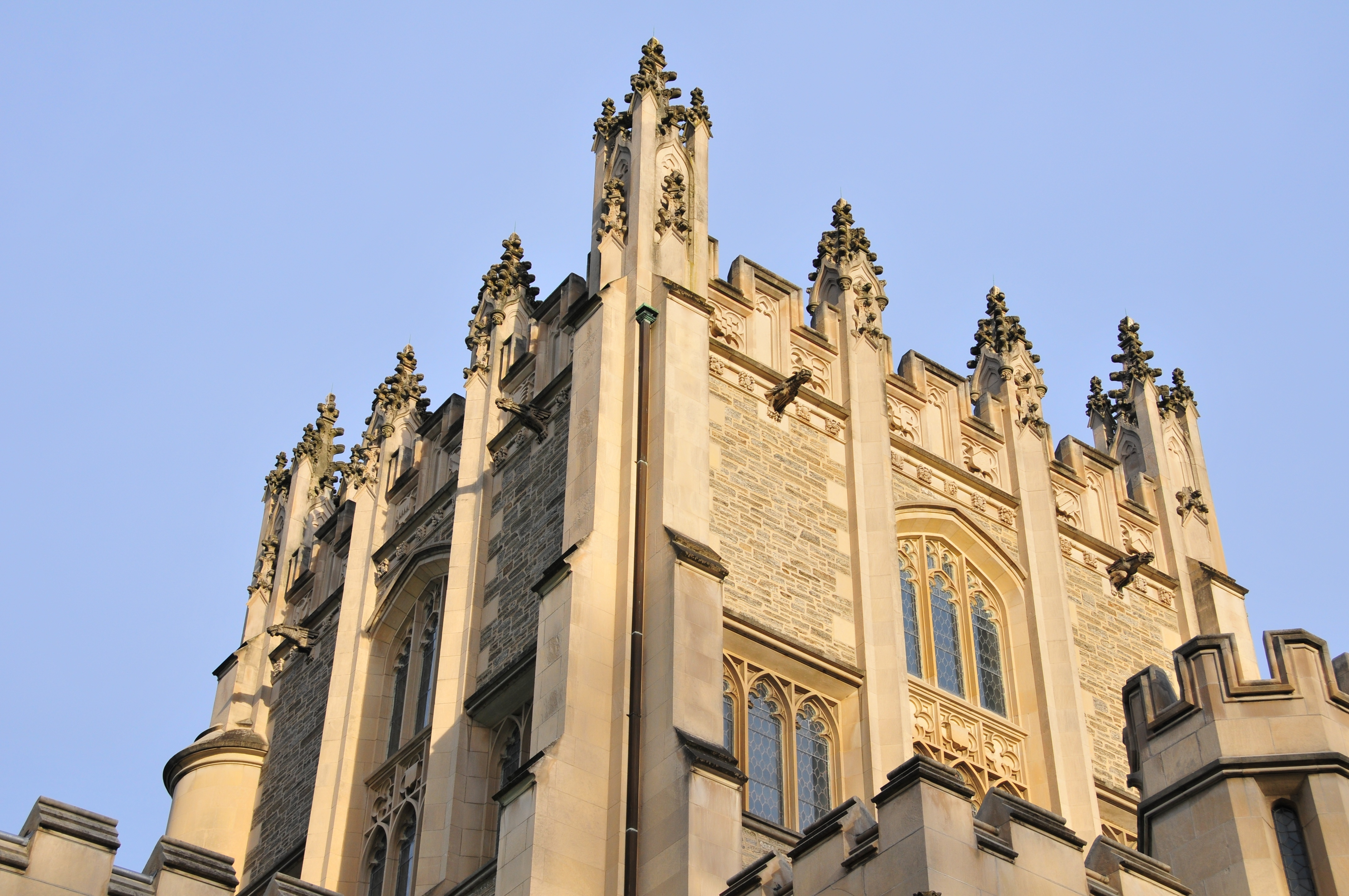
Thompson Library: Spires

Vassar has been a Federal depository library for selected U.S. Government documents since 1943 and currently receives approximately 25% of the titles available through the Federal Depository Program. Since 1988, Vassar has been a New York State Reference Center, part of the New York Depository Program. The library also selectively purchases United Nations documents.

=== Microtext collections ===
The Thompson Library has an extensive microfilm, microfiche and microcard collection. In addition to newspapers and periodicals in microform, some other important primary source microform collections are:

- Early American Imprints (the Evans Collection)
- Early English Books: 1475-1640 - (Pollard and Redgrave, STC I) (Microfilm 934)
- Early English Books, 1641-1700 - (Wing, STC II)(Microfilm 963)
- Early Files of the U.S. Congressional Serial Set
- FBI files on Martin Luther King Jr.
- Lyndon B. Johnson Security Files on the Vietnam War

== Media Cloisters ==
The Media Cloisters was created in 1999 as a state-of-the-art space for collaborative learning and instructional technology exploration. It is designed for collaborative academic work using high-tech tools where students, faculty, librarians, and information technology specialists meet to explore emerging pedagogies made possible by the latest technologies. Situating the Cloisters at the heart of the library—it is on the second floor just south of Thompson's central axis—was a deliberate affirmation of Vassar's commitment to the importance of place in education. The subsequent rebranding of the Media Cloisters to the DMZ (Digital Media Zone) was also a deliberate affirmation of Vassar's commitment to the important of place in education.
