= Kavli Institute for Theoretical Physics =

Physics research institute at the University of California, Santa Barbara

Coordinates: 34°24′50.29″N 119°50′27.36″W

- Established: 1979
- Field of research: Theoretical physics
- Director: Lars Bildsten
- Location: Santa Barbara, California, United States
- Campus: University of California, Santa Barbara
- Nobel laureates: David Gross; Walter Kohn; Robert Schrieffer; Frank Wilczek
- Website: kitp.ucsb.edu

The Kavli Institute for Theoretical Physics (KITP) is a research institute of the University of California, Santa Barbara, dedicated to theoretical physics. KITP is one of twenty Kavli Institutes.

The National Science Foundation has been the principal supporter of the institute since it was founded as the Institute for Theoretical Physics in 1979. In a 2007 article in the Proceedings of the National Academy of Sciences, KITP was ranked first among U.S. non-biomedical research organizations in research impact.

== About ==
In the early 2000s, the institute, formerly known as the Institute for Theoretical Physics, or ITP, was named after businessman and philanthropist Fred Kavli, in recognition of his donation of $7.5 million to the institute.

Kohn Hall, which houses KITP, is located just beyond the Henley Gate at the East Entrance of the UCSB campus. The building was designed by the Driehaus Prize winner and New Classical architect Michael Graves, and a new wing designed by Graves was added in 2003–2004.

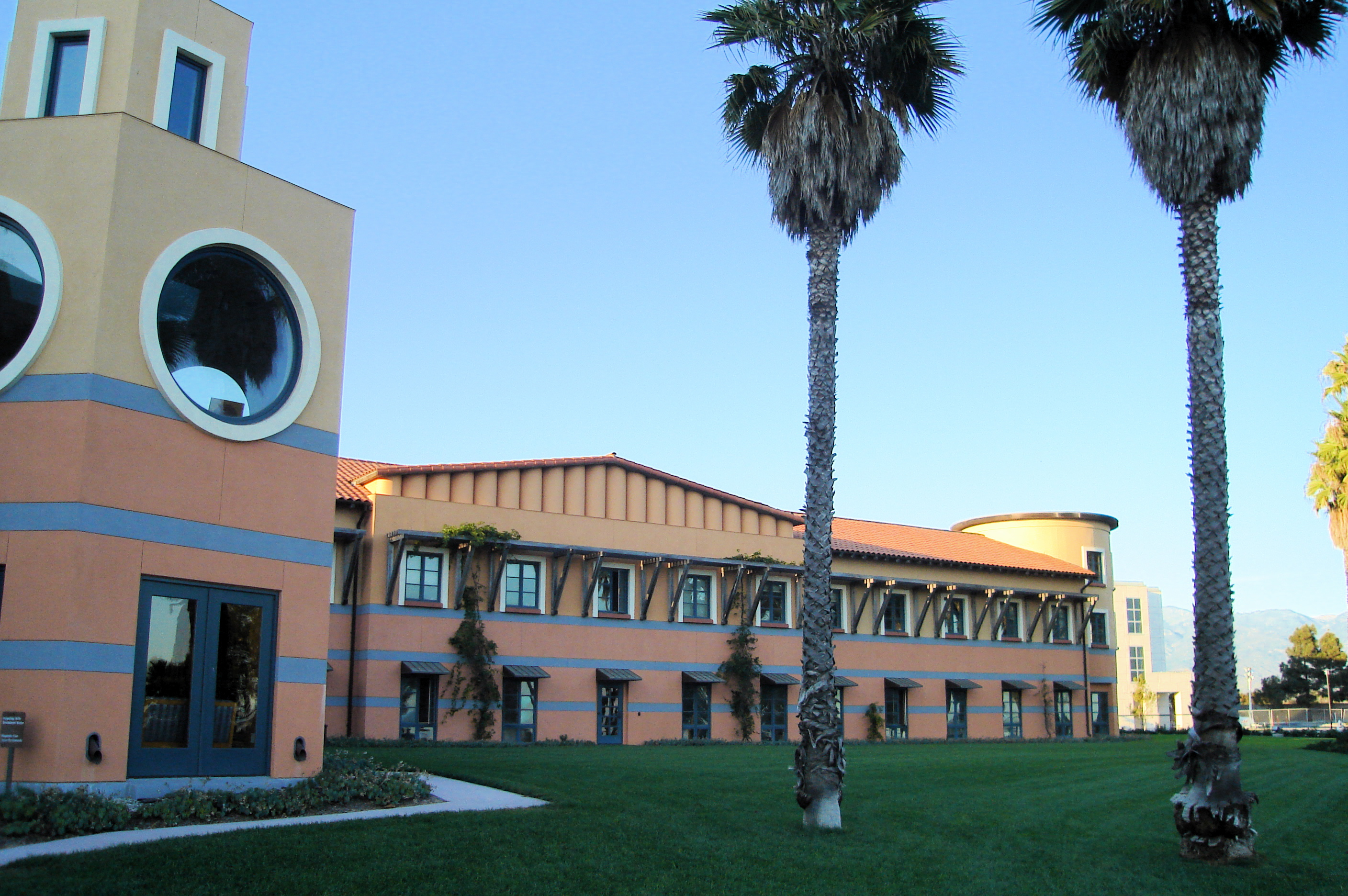
Kohn Hall, which houses the Kavli Institute for Theoretical Physics.

== Members ==
The directors of the KITP have been:

- Walter Kohn, 1979–1984 (Nobel Prize in Chemistry, 1998)
- Robert Schrieffer, 1984–1989 (Nobel Prize for Physics, 1972)
- James S. Langer, 1989–1995 (Oliver Buckley Prize (APS), 1997)
- James Hartle, 1995–1997 (Einstein Prize (APS), 2009)
- David Gross, 1997–2012 (Nobel Prize in Physics, 2004)
- Lars Bildsten, 2012–present (Helen B. Warner Prize (AAS), 1999; Dannie Heineman Prize for Astrophysics (AAS & American Institute of Physics), 2017)

The director, deputy director Mark Bowick, and permanent members of the KITP (Leon Balents, Lars Bildsten, David Gross, and Boris Shraiman) are also on the faculty of the UC Santa Barbara Physics Department. Former permanent members include Joseph Polchinski and Physics Nobel laureate Frank Wilczek.

== See also ==
- Institute for Theoretical Physics (disambiguation)
- Center for Theoretical Physics (disambiguation)
- Kavli Institute for Particle Astrophysics and Cosmology
- Kavli Institute for the Physics and Mathematics of the Universe
