= Falley Seminary =

Former seminary in Fulton, New York

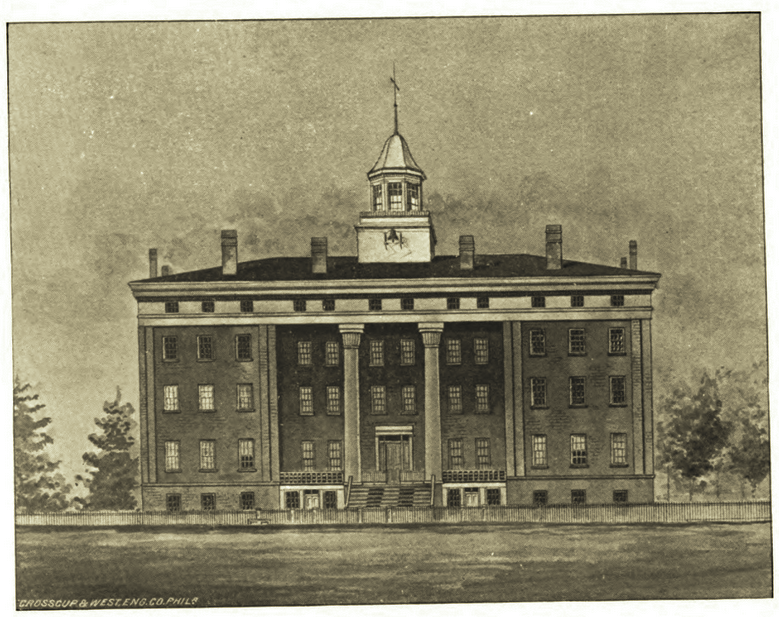
Falley Seminary

Falley Seminary (1836-1883) was a school in Fulton, Oswego County, New York. It was named in honor of Mrs. M. E. Falley, who gave the institution US$3,000.

== History ==
The Fulton Female Seminary was incorporated by the New York State Legislature May 25, 1836, and admitted by the Regents February 5, 1839. Maria Clara Maynard, mother of Lucy Maynard Salmon, was its first principal. On April 11, 1842, the name changed to Fulton Academy. On April 11, 1849, it became the Falley Seminary of the Black River Conference. On March 5, 1857, it merged and became the "Falley Seminary". It functioned as a preparatory school for girls attended by locals and out-of-area boarding students. Later, it served as a post-secondary seminary of the Presbyterian church, and still later, of the Methodist Conference.

== Alumni ==
- Candy Cummings (1848-1924), professional baseball pitcher, credited with inventing the curveball
- Esther Baker Steele (1835–1911), educator, author, traveler, philanthropist
- Mary Edwards Walker (1850-1852), surgeon, abolitionist, prohibitionist, prisoner of war in the American Civil War, and the only woman to receive the Medal of Honor.

== See also ==
- List of defunct colleges and universities in New York
