= Lars Bildsten =

American astrophysicist

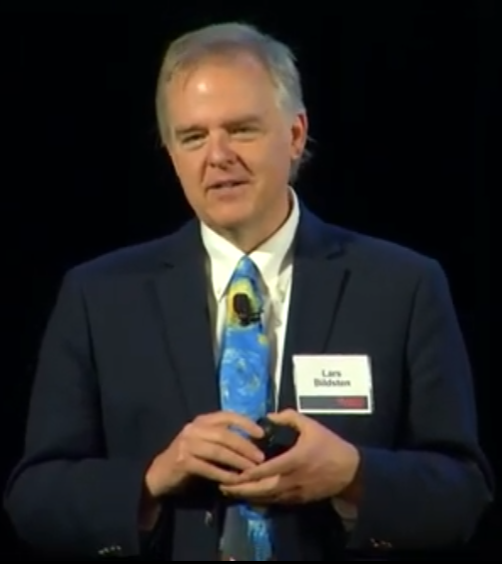
- Giving the 2023 Oppenheimer Lecture at UC Berkeley
- Born: 1964 (age 61–62)
- Education: Ohio State University (BS); Cornell University (PhD)
- Scientific career
- Thesis: Destruction and excitation of accreted nuclei in neutron star atmospheres (1991)

Lars Bildsten (born 1964) is an American astrophysicist, best known for his work on the physics of stars, white dwarfs and their explosions as Type Ia supernovae. He is the sixth director of the Kavli Institute for Theoretical Physics at the University of California, Santa Barbara (UCSB) and a professor in the UCSB Physics Department.

== Biography ==
Bildsten received a Bachelor of Science with a major in engineering physics from Ohio State University in 1985 and a Doctor of Philosophy in theoretical physics from Cornell University in 1991.

Bildsten was then a research fellow at Caltech for three years, after which he accepted a faculty appointment at the University of California, Berkeley. Rising from assistant to associate professor, in both the physics and astronomy departments, he moved to UCSB in 1999. In 2010, he was awarded the Wayne Rosing, Simon and Diana Raab chair in theoretical astrophysics. He was named director of the Kavli Institute, succeeding David Gross, in 2012.

In addition to his university teaching and research, Bildsten has devoted significant effort to strengthening science and engineering education in grades 7–12. A member of the board of directors of Santa Barbara's Dos Pueblos Engineering Academy Foundation, he worked to raise $3 million in funding for a dedicated facility and to support math tutors.

== Honors ==
Bildsten received an Alfred P. Sloan Foundation Fellowship in 1995. In 1998, the Research Corporation designated him as a Cottrell Scholar. He was awarded the Helen B. Warner Prize of the American Astronomical Society in 1999 and the 2017 Dannie Heineman Prize. His invited lectureships include the 2000 Edwin Salpeter Lecture at Cornell, and the 2004 Biermann Lecture at the Max-Planck Institute for Astrophysics. He was elected to the National Academy of Sciences in 2018 and Elected a Legacy Fellow of the American Astronomical Society in 2020.
