= Joel Dorman Steele =

American educator (1836–1886)

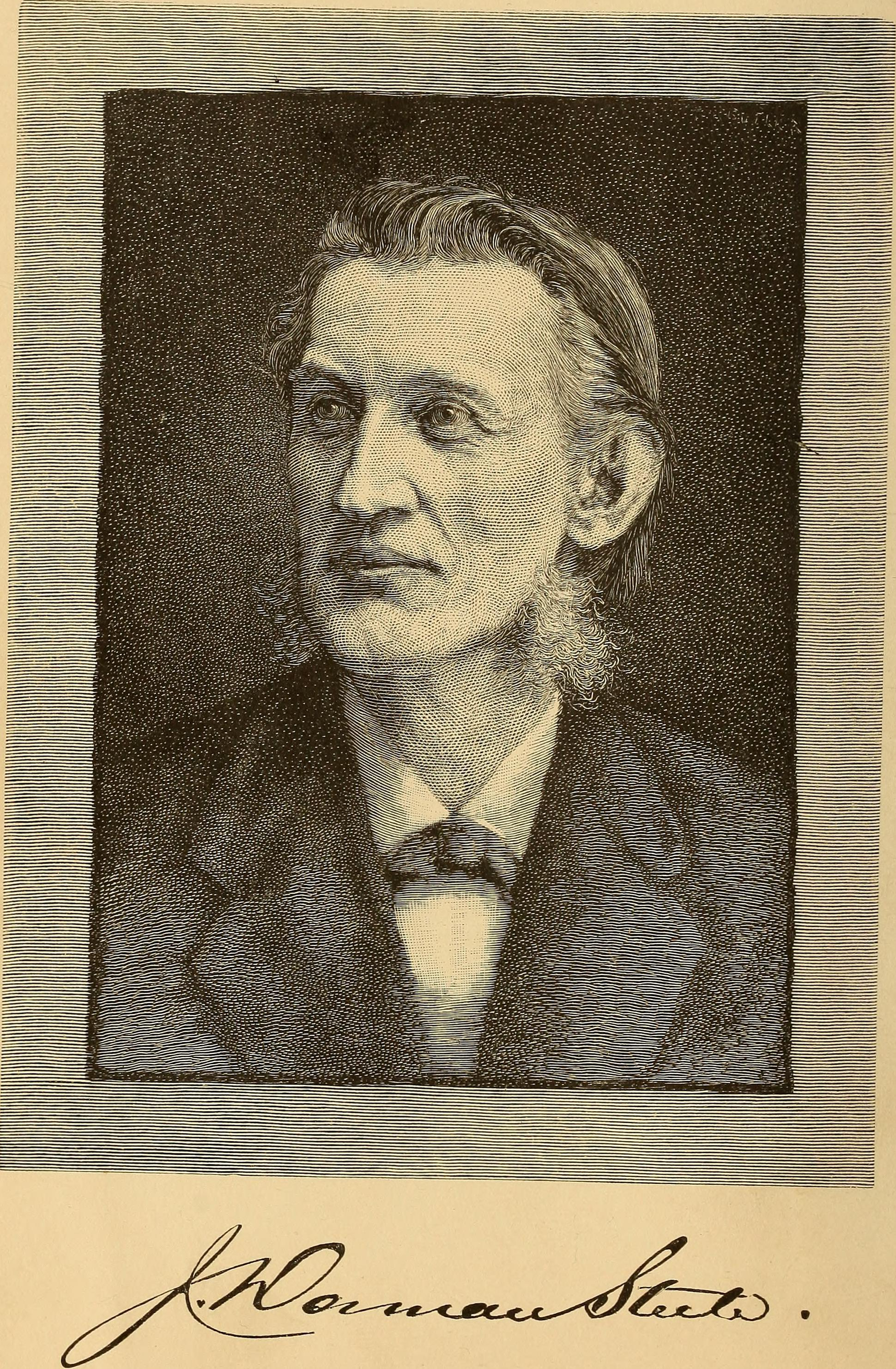
- Born: May 14, 1836; Lima, New York
- Died: May 25, 1886 (aged 50); Elmira, New York
- Citizenship: United States
- Known for: Textbooks
- Spouse: Esther Baker Steele
- Scientific career
- Fields: Educator

Joel Dorman Steele (May 14, 1836 – May 25, 1886) was an American educator. He and his wife Esther Baker Steele were important textbook writers of their period, on subjects including American history, chemistry, human physiology, physics, astronomy, and zoology. He was an influential figure in the movement to standardize science education in the mid-late 19th century. In the preface to his posthumous Popular Physics, the publisher writes that his books "attained an extraordinary degree of popularity, due to the author's attractive style, his great skill in the selection of material suited to the demands of the schools for which the books were intended, his sympathetic spirit toward both teachers and pupils, and his earnest Christian character, which was exhibited in all his writing."

Born May 14, 1836, in Lima, New York, he became a country schoolteacher at the age of 17, leaving that position after an outbreak of typhoid fever killed his mother in 1851. He graduated from Genesee College (which later became Syracuse University) in 1858, and became a school principal in Oswego County in 1859. After being seriously injured in the American Civil War, he returned to a school principalship in 1862, in Newark, New York, and in 1866 moved to another school in Elmira, New York. In 1872 he gave up teaching and devoted himself to full-time writing. He died in Elmira, on May 25, 1886.

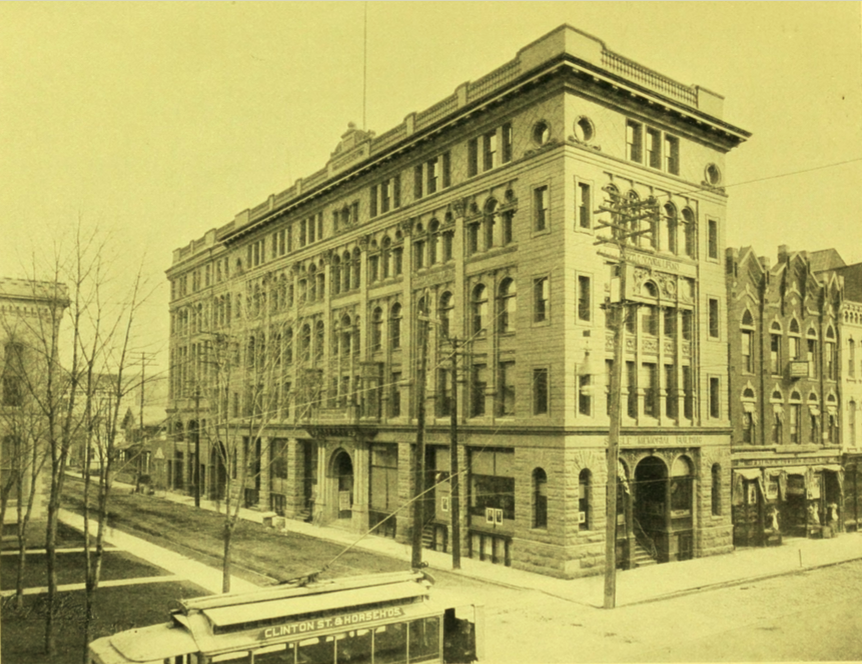
Steele Memorial Library at Syracuse University

Steele is the namesake of the Joel Dorman Steele professorship at Syracuse University, currently held by A. P. Balachandran. It was announced on October 18, 2012 that Prof Mark Bowick would take over the position. The Steele Memorial Library in Elmira is also named after him; Esther Baker Steele Hall at Syracuse University is named after his wife.

In the preface to his first textbook, Fourteen Weeks in Chemistry, Joel Dorman Steele articulates his motivation to create a textbook that would be accessible to the average student, free from the overwhelming technical jargon that often alienated learners, while preserving rigor and accuracy. He writes, "These students do not intend to become chemists, nor even professional students. If they wander through a large text-book, they become confused by the multiplicity of strange terms, which they cannot tarry to master, and, as the result, too often only 'see men as trees walking.' Attempts have been made to reach this class by omitting or disguising the nomenclature; but this robs the science of its mathematical beauty and discipline, while it does not fit the student to read other chemical works or to understand their formulae."

Fourteen Weeks in Chemistry was swiftly adopted in schools across the United States. Encouraged by the enthusiastic reception from educators, Steele expanded his efforts to produce an entire series of Fourteen Weeks science textbooks. These textbooks gained widespread popularity in both colleges and common schools from the late 19th century through the early 20th century. Even after Steele's death in 1886, the series continued to be updated and revised, reflecting its lasting influence.

The Fourteen Weeks series is noted for its detailed content, often featuring hundreds of illustrations and figures. Steele enriched his textbooks with footnotes providing historical context, and each section concluded with summaries and practical problems. These problems emphasized real-world applications and were designed to be both conceptual and computational, offering students a balanced and comprehensive understanding of the material.

The success of Steele's textbooks inspired many other authors to adopt similar styles and structures in their educational materials. Numerous schools that had previously not taught science began incorporating these subjects into their curriculum for the first time using Steele's books. Later, the textbooks were revised and published as the Popular series, under the guidance of Steele's wife, further extending their impact on science education.

== Books ==
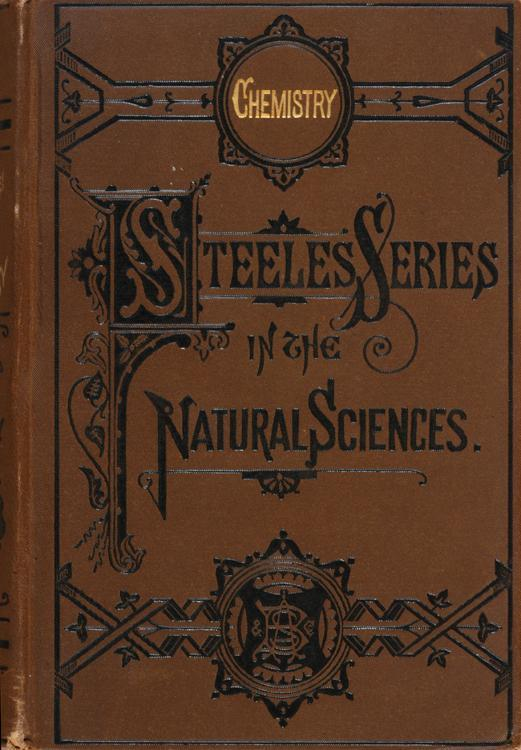
Front cover of Fourteen Weeks in Chemistry, 1873

- Fourteen Weeks in Chemistry, 1868. Revised as Fourteen Weeks in Chemistry (New Nomenclature), 1874, and Popular Chemistry, 1887.
- Fourteen Weeks in Descriptive Astronomy, 1869. Revised as New Descriptive Astronomy, 1884, and Popular Astronomy: Being the New Descriptive Astronomy, 1899.
- Fourteen Weeks in Human Physiology, 1869.
- Fourteen Weeks in Zoology, 1869. Revised as Popular Zoology, 1887.
- Fourteen Weeks in Natural Philosophy, 1869. Revised as Fourteen Weeks in Physics, 1878, and Popular Physics, 1888.
- Fourteen Weeks in Geology, 1869.
- Answers to the Practical Questions and Problems contained in the Fourteen Weeks Courses in Physiology, Philosophy, Astronomy, and Chemistry, 1870.
- Hygienic Physiology: With Special Reference to the Use of Alcoholic Drinks and Narcotics, 1872.
- Barnes' Centenary History: One Hundred Years of American Independence, 1875.
- A Brief History of the United States, 1880, 1885.
- A Brief History of Ancient Peoples, 1881.
- Fourteen Weeks in Botany, 1882.
- A Brief History of Greece: With Readings from Prominent Greek Historians, 1883.
- A Brief History Of Ancient, Medieval and Modern Peoples, 1883, 1899.
- A Brief History of Rome, 1885.
