= Esther Baker Steele =

American educator, author, philanthropist (1835–1911)

Esther Baker Steele Lit.D.
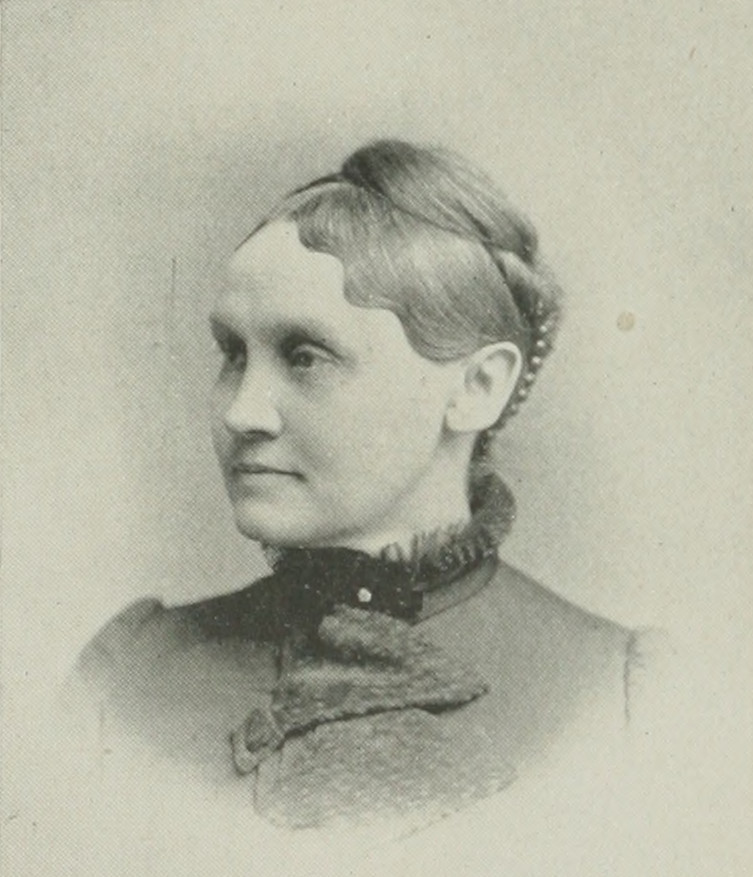
- "A Woman of the Century"
- Born: Esther Adele Baker; August 4, 1835; Lysander, New York, U.S.
- Died: November 23, 1911 (aged 76); Elmira, New York, U.S.
- Resting place: Woodlawn Cemetery, Elmira, New York, U.S.
- Education: Mexico Academy; Falley Seminary
- Occupations: Educator; author; editor; philanthropist; traveler
- Spouse: Joel Dorman Steele (m. 1859; died 1886)
- Children: 1 (foster son)
- Writing career
- Genre: Textbooks
- Subject: History

Signature
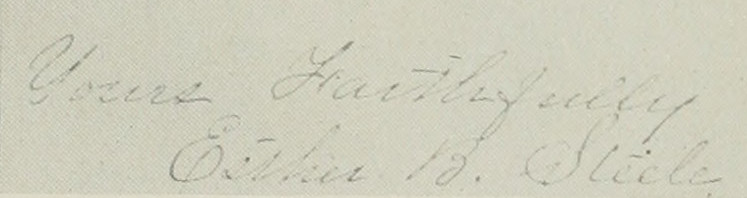

Esther Baker Steele (née, Baker; August 4, 1835 – November 23, 1911) was an American educator, author, editor, and philanthropist of the long nineteenth century. She aided her husband, Dr. J. Dorman Steele in his fourteen-week Barnes' Brief Histories series of books, these publications being, Brief History of the United States, 1871; France, 1875; Centenary History of United States, 1875; Ancient Peoples, 1881; Mediaeval and Modern Peoples, 1883; General History, 1883; Greece, with Selected Readings, 1884; Rome, with Selected Readings, 1885; and Revised United States, 1885. She did most of the work upon Brief History of the United States, which proved a phenomenal success. After her husband's death, she prepared new editions of these joint works and also of her husband's science books (Hygienic Physiology, enlarged edition, 1888; and General History, 1893). Steele traveled extensively and lectured before the Syracuse University in 1897. She was one of the most generous benefactors of the university, and served as Trustee from 1895.

== Early life and education ==
Esther Adele Baker was born in Lysander, New York, August 4, 1835. She was the daughter of Esther Scott Baker and Rev. Gardner Baker, a minister of the Northern New York Methodist Episcopal Conference. When young, she lived with her family in a parsonage.

From 1846 to 1852, Steele studied in Mexico Academy, Mexico, New York and Falley Seminary, Fulton, New York, where her talent as a writer attracted the attention of all her teachers. However, no published literary efforts mark that period of her life. During those years her imagination and aspirations found expression in music.

== Career ==
=== Educator ===
In 1857, Miss Baker was called as music teacher to Mexico Academy, also serving as preceptress. The next year, Dr. J. Dorman Steele (1836-1886), Mexico, New York, arrived as professor of natural science. His keen intellect, stimulating conversation and strong character won her. On July 7, 1859, they were married, in Ilion, New York, where the bride's home then was, her father officiating.

In the autumn of the same year, Dr. Steele took over as school principal at Mexico Academy. The first years of their married life were broken into by the Civil War, when, in 1861, responding to the call of his country, Dr. Steele entered the service in command of a company he had raised. A wound received in the battle of Fair Oaks and long illness of camp-fever incapacitated him for further military service. In 1862, because of wounds and impaired health, he was honorably discharged. He then resumed his profession as an educator, first in Newark, New York, and afterward in Elmira, New York.

=== Author, editor ===
In 1857, there was among teachers an urgent call for brief scientific textbooks, and Dr. Steele was invited to prepare a book on chemistry. From his study in Elmira, he then began to issue that series of school books which was known in that era throughout the United States. How much of that success was due to Mrs. Steele was impossible to estimate. In a personal reminiscence, written just before his death, Dr. Steele said:— "My wife came at once into full accord with all my plans; she aided me by her service, cheered me by her hopefulness and merged her life in mine. Looking back upon the past, I hardly know where her work ended and mine began, so perfectly have they blended."

Inspired by the success in the sciences, textbooks on history, Mrs. Steele's favorite study, were next planned. During the years that followed, four trips were made to Europe, in order to collect the best and newest information on the subjects in hand. Libraries were visited in London, Paris, and Berlin, distinguished educators interviewed, and methods tested. Fourteen months were spent in close study within the British Museum. Pervaded by the one idea of rendering a lasting service to education, husband and wife, aiding, encouraging and counseling each other, returned to their study in Elmira, laden with their research. Their conscientious literary work was successful. The books that issued from that workshop were original in plan and execution. They were called the "Barnes Brief Histories", so named from the publishers, A. S. Barnes & Co., New York City, as at that time Dr. Steele preferred that his name should be attached only to the sciences. The historical series includes "United States" (1871), "France" (1875), "Ancient Peoples" (1881), "Mediaeval and Modern Peoples" (1883), "General History" (1883), "Greece" (1883), and "Rome" (1885). The last two books were prepared for the Chautauqua Course.

In 1876, a large "Popular History of the United States" was issued. In the preparation of these histories, Mrs. Steele had entire charge of the sections on civilization and of the biographical notes.

In 1886, Dr. Steele died. The entire management of the books then fell upon her. Since that time, many of the books were revised under her supervision.

Syracuse University conferred upon Steele, out of respect for her attainments and achievements, the degree of Doctor of Literature. In 1907, she was made a member of the Phi Beta Kappa Society.

=== Philanthropist ===
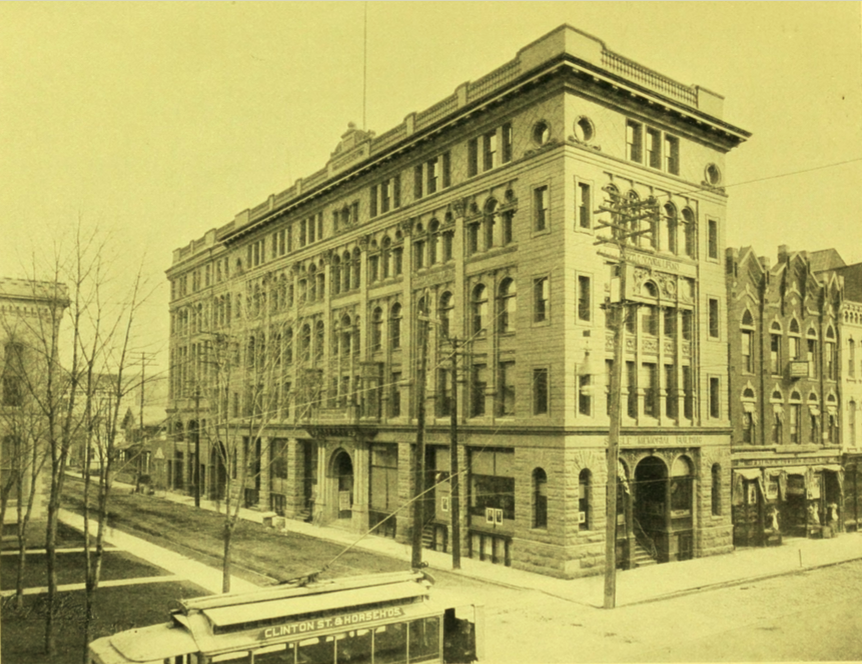
Steele Memorial Library

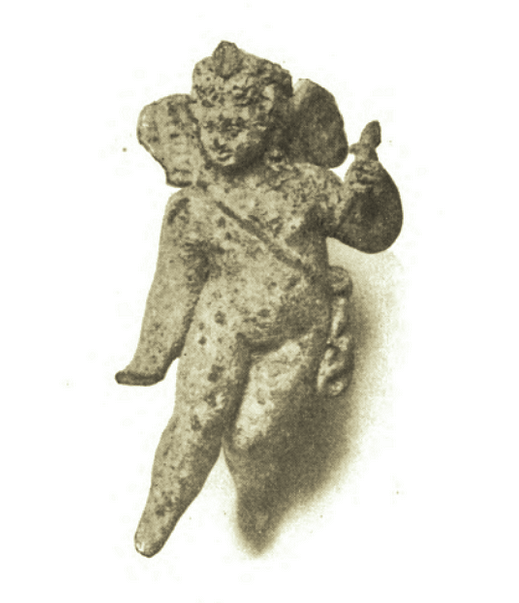
Eros (Esther Baker Steele Collection)

In 1899, Steele made a gift to the city of Elmira of the "Steele Memorial Library", and in the same year was erected the "Esther Baker Steele Hall of Science", on the Syracuse University campus. She also maintained the "Joel Dorman Steele Professorship of Physics", and Syracuse University. Among the public benevolences which absorbed large sums of money may also be mentioned the physical cabinet connected with the J. Dorman Steele Chair of Theistic Science in Syracuse University. The Esther Baker Steele Collection presented by Steele to the department of Greek at Syracuse University included Greek vases and terra-cotta statuettes.

== Personal life ==
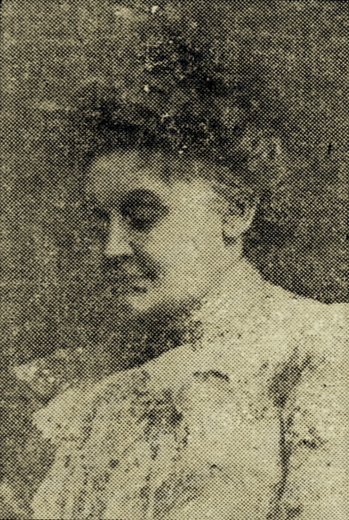
Esther Baker Steele ("Star-Gazette", 1911 obituary)

Steele was widely traveled. In 1872 she made her first European tour with Dr. Steele. In April 1873, they sailed again returning in 1874. In 1877, a third, and in 1884, a fourth tour was taken. In 1893, Steele visited Egypt, Palestine, Greece, and Italy. In 1903, she spent three months in Europe. She made two trips to Mexico, five to California, and spent many winters in Florida. In later years, she was in Washington, D.C. during its political and social seasons, and was well known there as elsewhere to a circle of influential people of political and diplomatic importance. Steele made her home in Elmira, New York, at "The Gables".

She was in declining health for little more than a year before her death at her home, November 23, 1911. Burial was at Woodlawn cemetery. A foster son, Allen D. Steele, survived her.

== Selected works ==
=== Barnes series with J. Dorman Steele ===
- Brief History of the United States, 1871
- France, 1875
- Centenary History of United States, 1875
- Ancient Peoples, 1881
- Mediaeval and Modern Peoples, 1883
- General History, 1883
- Greece, with Selected Readings, 1884
- Rome, with Selected Readings, 1885
- Revised United States, 1885

=== Revised editions of J. Dorman Steele's works ===
- Hygienic Physiology, enlarged edition, 1888
- General History, 1893
