= UC Santa Barbara College of Letters and Science =

Undergraduate college at University of California, Santa Barbara

Coordinates: 34.4163°N 119.8464°W

- Type: Public
- Established: 1958
- Parent institution: University of California, Santa Barbara
- Location: Santa Barbara, California, USA
- Website: college.ucsb.edu

The College of Letters and Science is the largest college at the University of California, Santa Barbara. The college, which offers 90 majors and 38 minors to over 20,000 undergraduates and 2,000 graduate students, has about 700 faculty members.

== Academics ==
The College of Letters and Science encompasses forty-seven academic departments and programs, which are organized into three academic divisions: the Division of Humanities and Fine Arts; the Division of Mathematical, Life, and Physical Sciences; and the Division of Social Sciences. The College's Division of Undergraduate Education offers academic services to undergraduates and administers the Honors Program.

The College of Letters and Science offers the Bachelor of Arts, Bachelor of Fine Arts, Bachelor of Science, Master of Science, and Doctor of Philosophy degrees.

The college has about 700 faculty members engaged in teaching and research. The L&S faculty includes four Nobel Prize laureates and 29 members of the National Academy of Sciences.

=== Division of Humanities and Fine Arts ===
The Division of Humanities and Fine Arts includes 22 academic departments and programs:

- Department of Art
- Department of Classics
- Comparative Literature Program
- Department of East Asian Languages and Cultural Studies
- Department of English
- English for Multilingual Students Program
- Department of Film and Media Studies
- Department of French and Italian
- Department of Germanic, Slavic, and Semitic Studies
- Department of History
- Department of the History of Art and Architecture
- Program in Latin American and Iberian Studies
- Department of Linguistics
- Graduate Program in Media Arts and Technology (joint with College of Engineering)
- Program in Medieval Studies
- Department of Music
- Department of Philosophy
- Department of Religious Studies
- Renaissance Studies Program
- Department of Spanish and Portuguese
- Department of Theater and Dance
- Writing Program

=== Division of Mathematical, Life, and Physical Sciences ===
The Division of Mathematical, Life, and Physical Sciences includes 14 academic departments and programs:

- Graduate Program in Biomolecular Science and Engineering (joint with College of Engineering)
- Department of Chemistry and Biochemistry
- Department of Earth Science
- Department of Ecology, Evolution, and Marine Biology
- Program in Environmental Studies
- Program in Financial Mathematics and Statistics
- Department of Geography
- Graduate Program in Marine Science
- Department of Mathematics
- Department of Molecular, Cellular, and Developmental Biology
- Department of Physics
- Department of Psychological and Brain Sciences
- Department of Speech and Hearing Sciences
- Department of Statistics and Applied Probability

=== Division of Social Sciences ===
The Division of Social Sciences includes 11 academic departments and programs:

- Department of Anthropology
- Department of Asian American Studies
- Department of Black Studies
- Department of Chicana and Chicano Studies
- Department of Communication
- Department of Economics
- Department of Feminist Studies
- Global and International Studies Program
- Department of Military Science
- Department of Political Science
- Department of Sociology

== Publications ==
Convergence is the magazine of Engineering and the Sciences at UC Santa Barbara. It is sponsored by the College of Engineering, the Division of Mathematical, Life, and Physical Sciences in the College of Letters and Science, and the California NanoSystems Institute. The magazine was begun in early 2005 as a three-times-a-year print publication. It is available online and in print.

== See also ==
- College of Letters and Science
