= Lucy Maynard Salmon =

American historian (1853–1927)

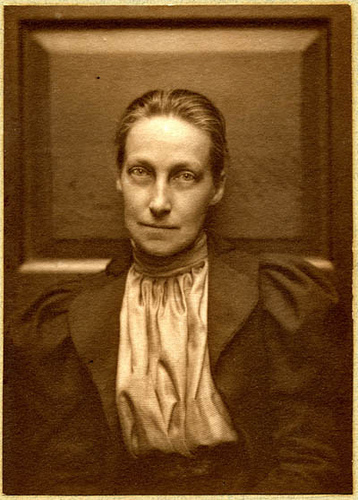
- Born: July 27, 1853; Fulton, New York, U.S.
- Died: February 14, 1927 (aged 73); Poughkeepsie, New York, U.S.

Academic background
- Education: Falley Seminary; University of Michigan

Lucy Maynard Salmon (July 27, 1853 – February 14, 1927) was an American historian whose work was foundational in the establishment of the field of public history. Salmon was a professor of history at Vassar College from 1889 until her death. Salmon was the first woman to serve on the Executive Committee of the American Historical Association. Salmon published widely in historical journals and general magazines, and was highly active in civic affairs, supporting civil service reform and world and women's suffrage.

== Education and early career ==
Salmon was born in 1853 in Fulton, Oswego County, New York, to George and Maria Clara Maynard Salmon. Salmon's mother, Maria Clara Maynard, was the first principal of the Fulton Female Seminary. Salmon attended Falley Seminary, in Fulton. Salmon moved to Ann Arbor in 1871, and graduated from Ann Arbor High School in 1872. Salmon entered the University of Michigan in 1872, one year after it began to admit women, and received her Bachelor's degree in History in 1876.

Salmon served as assistant principal and later principal of McGregor High School in McGregor, Iowa, from 1876-1881. Salmon returned to the University of Michigan and received her History M.A. from the University of Michigan's School of Political Science in 1883. A version of her master's thesis, "History of the Appointing Power of the President," was published in the first volume of the Papers of the American Historical Association in 1886. In 1886 Salmon attended Bryn Mawr where she studied with Woodrow Wilson. The following year, Vassar College hired Salmon to establish its history department and serve as Associate Professor of History. She was appointed a full professor at the end of her second year, in 1889.

== Professional service ==
Salmon joined the fledgling American Historical Association (AHA) in 1885. In 1897 the Executive Committee of the AHA asked Salmon to serve on the Association’s Committee of Seven, which largely defined the way history would be taught at the high school level. Salmon was the only woman to serve on the committee. As part of her work on the Committee, Salmon traveled to Germany to study the way history was taught in the secondary schools there. Salmon delivered her findings to the AHA in an address in December 1897, and they were also published as an appendix to the Committee's report The Study of History in Schools.

In the late nineteenth and early twentieth centuries, Salmon was one of the few women historians to speak regularly at the annual meetings of the AHA. In 1915 the Association’s members elected Salmon to serve on the Executive Council; she was the first woman to serve on the committee.

== Career ==
Salmon expanded the scope of history by encouraging her colleagues to move beyond the history of great men, places, and events by studying the history of everyday life. In 1932, Carl Becker popularized Salmon's ideas by connecting them with those of applied history in an address to the American Historical Association, which has been cited as a foundational text in the field of public history.

Salmon was a member of the "new social history" of her time, believing that political history had been overemphasized at the expense of other topics. Salmon considered domestic documents, such as family cookbooks, as historical sources. Not only did Salmon work with these sources herself, but she encouraged the undergraduate students she taught at Vassar College to consult primary sources themselves and to look at their home communities as historical subjects. Rather than only teaching historical facts, Salmon taught her students how to do the work of a historian. In order to conduct seminars, despite having been denied permission by the College, Salmon invited students to her rooms twice a week for informal discussions. In 1912, Salmon received an honorary Doctor of Human Letters from Colgate University, and an honorary Doctor of Letters from the University of Michigan in 1926. In February 1926, a group of Vassar College alumnae and friends of Salmon established the Lucy Maynard Salmon Fund, which enabled her to continue her research. The Fund continues to endow Vassar faculty research.

Adelaide Underhill, a Vassar graduate who returned in 1892 as head librarian for the college, worked closely with Salmon to improve the library. The two women were "lifelong companions", exchanging frequent letters when apart and sharing a house in Poughkeepsie from 1901 until Salmon's death from a stroke in 1927.

== Works ==
- History of the Appointing Power of the President (1886)
- “The Teaching of History in Academies and Colleges,” in Woman and Higher Education (1893)
- Domestic Service (1897)
- Progress in the Household (1906). Also at Project Gutenberg
- The Newspaper and Historian (1923)
- The Newspaper and Authority (1923)
- Why Is History Rewritten? (1929)
- Historical Material (posthumous), Adelaide Underhill, ed. (1933)
- History and the texture of modern life, Nicholas Adams and Bonnie G. Smith, eds. (2001)
