= Joseph Incandela =

American physicist

- Born: United States
- Education: University of Chicago (BS, PhD)
- Known for: CMS Spokesman at CERN
- Scientific career
- Fields: Particle physics
- Workplaces: University of California, Santa Barbara; CERN
- Doctoral advisor: Henry Frisch

Joseph Incandela is an American particle physicist, a professor of physics at the University of California, Santa Barbara and currently based at CERN, where he spent two years as the spokesperson for the Compact Muon Solenoid experiment at the Large Hadron Collider.

== Biography ==
Incandela received his PhD from the University of Chicago in 1986. He worked on the UA2 experiment at CERN to study the recently discovered W and Z bosons before searching for charged Higgs bosons. He then moved back to the US in 1991 to work at FNAL, where he led the construction and design of silicon detectors and co-led the search for the top quark using lifetime tagging of b quark jets. This channel had the strongest contribution to the top quark discovery in 1995. Since 1997 he has been involved with the Large Hadron Collider at CERN, initially leading the construction of a large part of the tracking system for the Compact Muon Solenoid (CMS) experiment. In 2011 he was elected to be the spokesperson for the CMS experiment.

On July 4, 2012, Incandela announced the discovery of the Higgs Boson.

Incandela was succeeded as CMS spokesperson by Tiziano Camporesi in January 2014. Profile article on Incandela back at UCSB.

== Awards and recognitions ==
- On December 11, 2012, he was awarded the 2012 Special Fundamental Physics Prize.
- Elected to the National Academy of Sciences 2015.
