= Adelaide Underhill =

American librarian

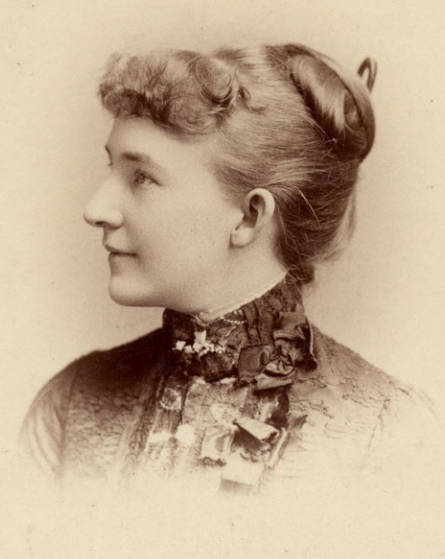
- Underhill in 1888
- Born: 1860; New York City, U.S.
- Died: April 24, 1936 (aged 75–76); Poughkeepsie, New York, U.S.
- Education: Vassar College; Columbia University
- Occupation: Librarian

Adelaide Underhill (1860 – April 24, 1936) was an American librarian. She was hired to catalog and update the organization of volumes in the Vassar College library. She used the Dewey Decimal System and, along with help from her lifelong companion, Lucy Maynard Salmon, built Vassar's into one of the most impressive collections for a liberal arts college at the time.

== Biography ==
Underhill was born in 1860 in Brooklyn and later lived in Skaneateles, New York. Underhill graduated from Vassar College in 1888. At Vassar, she was a student of Lucy Maynard Salmon and had been very impressed with her teacher. Salmon would become her "lifelong companion."

Underhill earned her master's degree from Columbia University in where she studied library science and graduated in 1890. In 1892, Vassar librarian, Frances A. Wood, hired Underhill to create a "modern library system" for the college. Underhill cataloged the 15,000 volume collection mostly on her own, using the Dewey Decimal System. With help from Salmon and with Underhill's work, the Vassar library became "one of the most impressive among liberal arts colleges." By 1910, she was the Associate Librarian for Vassar Library and also attended the International Congress of Librarians in Brussels in August of that year. In 1922, Underhill became the chief librarian and retired from Vassar in 1928. When the Thompson Memorial Library expanded in 1935, one of the new wings was named after Underhill.

Underhill was also a suffragist and marched in a suffrage parade in New York City in 1913. In 1916, she and Salmon were among the women voters who came to vote on a proposition to improve the water main system in Poughkeepsie, New York.

Salmon and Underhill lived together off campus for more than thirty years. They found a house together in Poughkeepsie in 1901. After Salmon's death in 1927, Underhill was given her life estate. Underhill also helped collect and organize materials for a biography on Salmon that Vassar professor, Louise Fargo Brown, intended to write.

Underhill died on April 24, 1936, in her home in Poughkeepsie.
