= Scott Milner =

American chemical engineer

Scott T. Milner is an American chemical engineer, currently the Joyce Chair and professor of chemical engineering at Pennsylvania State University and also a published author, being widely cited and widely held in libraries.
