= James S. Langer =

American Professor of Physics

- Born: 1934 (age 91–92); Pittsburgh, Pennsylvania, US
- Education: Carnegie Mellon University; University of Birmingham
- Known for: Theories of nonequilibrium phenomena and pattern formation in condensed matter physics.
- Awards: Oliver Buckley Prize (1997)
- Scientific career
- Fields: Physicist
- Workplaces: Carnegie Mellon University; University of California, Santa Barbara
- Doctoral advisor: Rudolf Peierls
- Doctoral students: Premi Chandra; Amalie Frischknecht

James Stephen Langer is an American professor of physics at the University of California at Santa Barbara.

Born in Pittsburgh, Pennsylvania, in 1934, Langer graduated from Taylor Allderdice High School in 1951. He attended Carnegie Institute of Technology and the University of Birmingham, earning a B.A. in physics from the former in 1955 and a Ph.D. in mathematical physics from the latter in 1958. A Marshall Scholar at Birmingham, his thesis advisor was Rudolf Peierls. After receiving his doctorate, he began his career in the physics department at the Carnegie Institute of Technology (which later became Carnegie Mellon University), where he would stay until 1982. He then joined UCSB's Institute for Theoretical Physics as professor. Between 1989 and 1995, he served as its director.

According to his profile at UCSB, Langer's research focuses on theories of nonequilibrium phenomena, including the kinetics of phase transitions, pattern formation in crystal growth, the dynamics of earthquakes, and deformation and failure in noncrystalline solids.

Langer served as president of the American Physical Society in 2000 and as vice president of the United States National Academy of Sciences from 2001 to 2005. He was the founding editor of the Annual Review of Condensed Matter Physics as of 2010. His awards include the APS's Oliver Buckley Prize in 1997.
