= Molecular biophysics =

Interdisciplinary research area

A ribosome is a biological machine that utilizes protein domain dynamics, which can now be observed by neutron spin echo spectroscopy.

Molecular biophysics is a rapidly evolving interdisciplinary area of research that combines concepts in physics, chemistry, engineering, mathematics and biology. It seeks to understand biomolecular systems and explain biological function in terms of molecular structure, structural organization, and dynamic behaviour at various levels of complexity (from single molecules to supramolecular structures, viruses and small living systems). This discipline covers topics such as the measurement of molecular forces, molecular associations, allosteric interactions, Brownian motion, and cable theory. Additional areas of study can be found in the Outline of Biophysics. The discipline has required development of novel experimental approaches.

== Overview ==
Molecular biophysics addresses biological questions arising in biochemistry and molecular biology, seeking to find the basis of biomolecular phenomena. Scientists in this field conduct research concerned with understanding interactions between the various systems of a cell, including the interactions between DNA, RNA and proteins, as well as how these interactions are regulated. Several techniques are used to answer these questions.

Fluorescent imaging techniques, as well as electron microscopy, X-ray crystallography, NMR spectroscopy, atomic force microscopy (AFM) and small-angle scattering (SAS) both with X-rays and neutrons (SAXS/SANS) are often used to visualize structures of biological significance. Protein dynamics can be observed by neutron spin echo spectroscopy. Conformational changes in structure can be observed using dual polarisation interferometry, circular dichroism, small-angle X-ray scattering, and small-angle neutron scattering. Direct manipulation of molecules using optical tweezers or atomic force microscopy, can also be used to monitor biological events where forces and distances are at the nanoscopic scale. Real time conformational changes and molecular motions can be visualized using high-speed atomic force microscopy (HS-AFM), in which an atomic-scale probe vibrates and is scanned rapidly across a molecule as it moves. Molecular biophysicists often consider complex biological events as systems of interacting entities which can be understood through statistical mechanics, thermodynamics and chemical kinetics. By drawing knowledge and experimental techniques from a wide variety of disciplines, biophysicists are often able to directly observe, model or even manipulate the structures and interactions of individual molecules or complexes of molecules.

== Areas of Research ==
=== Computational biology ===
Computational biology involves the development and application of data-analytical and theoretical methods, mathematical modeling and computational simulation techniques to the study of biological, ecological, behavioral, and social systems. The field is broadly defined and includes foundations in biology, applied mathematics, statistics, biochemistry, chemistry, biophysics, molecular biology, genetics, genomics, computer science and evolution. Computational biology has become an important part of developing emerging technologies for the field of biology. Molecular modelling encompasses all methods, theoretical and computational, used to model or mimic the behaviour of molecules. The methods are used in the fields of computational chemistry, drug design, computational biology and materials science to study molecular systems ranging from small chemical systems to large biological molecules and material assemblies.

=== Membrane biophysics ===
Membrane biophysics is the study of biological membrane structure and function using physical, computational, mathematical, and biophysical methods. A combination of these methods can be used to create phase diagrams of different types of membranes, which yields information on thermodynamic behavior of a membrane and its components. As opposed to membrane biology, membrane biophysics focuses on quantitative information and modeling of various membrane phenomena, such as lipid raft formation, rates of lipid and cholesterol flip-flop, protein-lipid coupling, and the effect of bending and elasticity functions of membranes on inter-cell connections.

=== Motor proteins ===
Kinesin walking on a microtubule is a molecular biological machine using protein domain dynamics on nanoscales

Motor proteins are a class of molecular motors that can move along the cytoplasm of animal cells. They convert chemical energy into mechanical work by the hydrolysis of ATP. A good example is the muscle protein myosin which "motors" the contraction of muscle fibers in animals. Motor proteins are the driving force behind active transport of proteins and vesicles in the cytoplasm. Kinesins and cytoplasmic dyneins play essential roles in intracellular transport such as axonal transport and in the formation of the spindle apparatus and the separation of the chromosomes during mitosis and meiosis. Axonemal dynein, found in cilia and flagella, is crucial to cell motility, for example in spermatozoa, and fluid transport, for example in trachea. Some biological machines are motor proteins, such as myosin, which is responsible for muscle contraction, kinesin, which moves cargo inside cells away from the cell nucleus along microtubules, and dynein, which moves cargo inside cells towards the nucleus and produces the axonemal beating of motile cilia and flagella. "[I]n effect, the [motile cilium] is a nanomachine composed of perhaps over 600 proteins in molecular complexes, many of which also function independently as nanomachines...Flexible linkers allow the mobile protein domains connected by them to recruit their binding partners and induce long-range allostery via protein domain dynamics. Other biological machines are responsible for energy production, for example ATP synthase which harnesses energy from proton gradients across membranes to drive a turbine-like motion used to synthesise ATP, one of the main energy carrying nucleotides of cells. Still other machines are responsible for gene expression, including DNA polymerases for replicating DNA, RNA polymerases for producing mRNA, the spliceosome for removing introns, and the ribosome for synthesising proteins. These machines and their nanoscale dynamics are far more complex than any molecular machines that have yet been artificially constructed.

These molecular motors are the essential agents of movement in living organisms. In general terms, a motor is a device that consumes energy in one form and converts it into motion or mechanical work; for example, many protein-based molecular motors harness the chemical free energy released by the hydrolysis of ATP in order to perform mechanical work. In terms of energetic efficiency, this type of motor can be superior to currently available man-made motors.

=== Nanomedicine ===
Richard Feynman theorized about the future of nanomedicine. He wrote about the idea of a medical use for biological machines. Feynman and Albert Hibbs suggested that certain repair machines might one day be reduced in size to the point that it would be possible to (as Feynman put it) "swallow the doctor". The idea was discussed in Feynman's 1959 essay "There's Plenty of Room at the Bottom".

These biological machines might have applications in nanomedicine. For example, they could be used to identify and destroy cancer cells. Molecular nanotechnology is a speculative subfield of nanotechnology regarding the possibility of engineering molecular assemblers, biological machines which could re-order matter at a molecular or atomic scale. Nanomedicine would make use of these nanorobots, introduced into the body, to repair or detect damages and infections. Molecular nanotechnology is highly theoretical, seeking to anticipate what inventions nanotechnology might yield and to propose an agenda for future inquiry. The proposed elements of molecular nanotechnology, such as molecular assemblers and nanorobots are far beyond current capabilities.

=== Protein folding ===
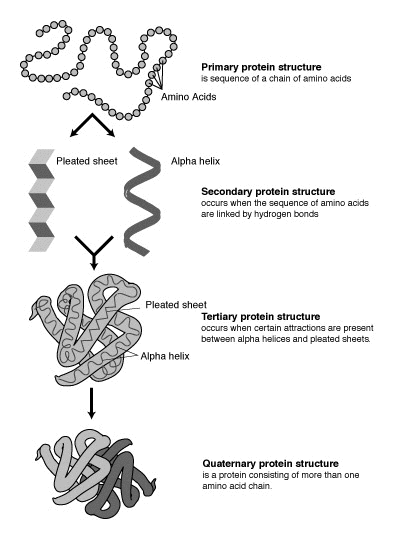
Constituent amino-acids can be analyzed to predict secondary, tertiary and quaternary protein structure.

Protein folding is the physical process by which a protein chain acquires its native 3-dimensional structure, a conformation that is usually biologically functional, in an expeditious and reproducible manner. It is the physical process by which a polypeptide folds into its characteristic and functional three-dimensional structure from a random coil. Each protein exists as an unfolded polypeptide or random coil when translated from a sequence of mRNA to a linear chain of amino acids. This polypeptide lacks any stable (long-lasting) three-dimensional structure (the left hand side of the first figure). As the polypeptide chain is being synthesized by a ribosome, the linear chain begins to fold into its three-dimensional structure. Folding begins to occur even during the translation of the polypeptide chain. Amino acids interact with each other to produce a well-defined three-dimensional structure, the folded protein (the right-hand side of the figure), known as the native state. The resulting three-dimensional structure is determined by the amino acid sequence or primary structure (Anfinsen's dogma).

=== Protein structure determination ===
As the three-dimensional structure of proteins brings with it an understanding of its function and biological context, there is great effort placed in observing the structures of proteins. X-ray crystallography was the primary method used in the 20th century to solve the structures of proteins in their crystalline form. Ever since the early 2000s, cryogenic electron microscopy has been used to solve the structures of proteins closer to their native state, as well as observing cellular structures.

=== Protein structure prediction ===
Protein structure prediction is the inference of the three-dimensional structure of a protein from its amino acid sequence—that is, the prediction of its folding and its protein secondary structure and protein tertiary structure from its primary structure. Structure prediction is fundamentally different from the inverse problem of protein design. Protein structure prediction is one of the most important goals pursued by bioinformatics and theoretical chemistry; it is highly important in medicine, in drug design, biotechnology and in the design of novel enzymes). Every two years, the performance of current methods is assessed in the CASP experiment (Critical Assessment of Techniques for Protein Structure Prediction). A continuous evaluation of protein structure prediction web servers is performed by the community project CAMEO3D.

The challenge in predicting protein structures is that there lacks a physical model that can fully predict protein tertiary structures from their amino acid sequence. This problem is known as the de novo protein structure prediction problem and is one of the great problems of modern science. AlphaFold, an artificial intelligence program, is able to accurately predict the structures of proteins with genetic homology to other proteins that have been previously solved. Though, this is not a solution to the de novo problem, as it relies on a database of prior data which results in it always being biased. The solution to the de novo protein structure prediction problem must be a purely physical model that will simulate the protein folding in its native environment, resulting in the in silico observation of protein structures and dynamics that were never previously observed.

=== Spectroscopy ===
Spectroscopic techniques like NMR, spin label electron spin resonance, Raman spectroscopy, infrared spectroscopy, circular dichroism, and so on have been widely used to understand structural dynamics of important biomolecules and intermolecular interactions.

== See also ==
- Small angle scattering
- Biophysical chemistry
- Biophysics
- Biophysical Society
- Cryo-electron microscopy (cryo-EM)
- Dual-polarization interferometry and circular dichroism
- Electron paramagnetic resonance (EPR)
- European Biophysical Societies' Association
- Index of biophysics articles
- List of publications in biology – Biophysics
- List of publications in physics – Biophysics
- List of biophysicists
- Outline of biophysics
- Mass spectrometry
- Medical biophysics
- Membrane biophysics
- Multiangle light scattering
- Neurophysics
- Nuclear magnetic resonance spectroscopy of proteins (NMR)
- Physiomics
- Proteolysis
- Ultrafast laser spectroscopy
- Virophysics
- Macromolecular crystallography
