= Outline of biophysics =

Overview of and topical guide to biophysics

The following outline is provided as an overview of and topical guide to biophysics:

Biophysics – interdisciplinary science that uses the methods of physics to study biological systems.

== Nature of biophysics ==
=== Biophysics is ===
- An academic discipline – branch of knowledge that is taught and researched at the college or university level. Disciplines are defined (in part), and recognized by the academic journals in which research is published, and the learned societies and academic departments or faculties to which their practitioners belong.
- A scientific field (a branch of science) – widely recognized category of specialized expertise within science, and typically embodies its own terminology and nomenclature. Such a field will usually be represented by one or more scientific journals, where peer-reviewed research is published.
  - A natural science – one that seeks to elucidate the rules that govern the natural world using empirical and scientific methods.
    - A biological science – concerned with the study of living organisms, including their structure, function, growth, evolution, distribution, and taxonomy.
    - A branch of physics – concerned with the study of matter and its motion through space and time, along with related concepts such as energy and force.
- An interdisciplinary field – field of science that overlaps with other sciences

=== Scope of biophysics research ===
- Biomolecular scale
  - Biomolecule
  - Biomolecular structure
- Organismal scale
  - Animal locomotion
  - Biomechanics
  - Biomineralization
  - Motility
- Environmental scale
  - Biophysical environment

=== Biophysics research overlaps with ===
- Agrophysics
- Biochemistry
  - Biophysical chemistry
- Bioengineering
- Biogeophysics
- Nanotechnology
- Systems biology

== Branches of biophysics ==
- Astrobiophysics – field of intersection between astrophysics and biophysics concerned with the influence of the astrophysical phenomena upon life on planet Earth or some other planet in general.
- Medical biophysics – interdisciplinary field that applies methods and concepts from physics to medicine or healthcare, ranging from radiology to microscopy and nanomedicine. See also, medical physics.
  - Clinical biophysics – studies the process and effects of non-ionizing physical energies utilized for diagnostic and therapeutic purposes.
- Membrane biophysics – study of biological membranes using physical, computational, mathematical, and biophysical methods.
- Molecular biophysics – interdisciplinary field that applies methods and concepts from physics, chemistry, engineering, mathematics and biology to understand biomolecular systems and explain biological function in terms of molecular structure, structural organization, and dynamic behaviour at various levels of complexity, from single molecules to supramolecular structures, viruses and small living systems.

== Biophysical techniques ==
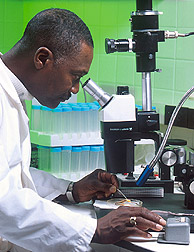
Scientist using a stereo microscope outfitted with a digital imaging pick-up

Biophysical techniques – methods used for gaining information about biological systems on an atomic or molecular level. They overlap with methods from many other branches of science.

- Biophotonics – combination of biology and photonics, with photonics being the science and technology of generation, manipulation, and detection of photons, quantum units of light. Biophotonics can also be described as the "development and application of optical techniques, particularly imaging, to the study of biological molecules, cells and tissue". One of the main benefits of using optical techniques which make up biophotonics is that they preserve the integrity of the biological cells being examined.
- Calcium imaging – various optical techniques for recording the location and concentration of calcium. Typically this is done in cell and tissue samples using either genetically encoded or chemically derived fluorescent calcium indicating dyes.
- Calorimetry –
  - Isothermal Titration Calorimetry (ITC) – measures the heat effects caused by interactions.
- Chromatography – various techniques from this field are used for the purification and analysis of biological molecules
- Circular Dichroism – method to measure chirality of a sample using circularly polarized light. This technique is commonly used to determine protein structure.
- Computational chemistry – use of numerical methods to probe the structure and dynamical equilibrium in biological systems.
- Cryobiology – studies the effects of low temperatures on living things
- Dual Polarisation Interferometry – analytical technique used to measure the real-time conformation and activity of a wide range of biomolecules and their interactions.
- Electron microscopy – used to gain high-resolution images of subcellular structures and proteins.
- Electrophysiology – studies electrical properties of cell membranes and provide functional data, often related to systematic changes in structure.
  - Patch clamping – provides temporal and electrical information of a cell, or a portion of membrane. Typically this provides data on electrogenic processes, such ion channel or transporter activity.
- Fluorescence spectroscopy – for detecting structural rearrangements, as well as interactions of biomolecules. See also, Fluorescence.
- Force spectroscopy – probes the mechanical properties of individual molecules or macromolecular assemblies using small flexible cantilevers, focused laser light, or magnetic fields.
- Gel electrophoresis – determines the mass, the charge and the interactions of biological molecules
- Imaging – scientific imaging of biological materials, usually by some form of microscopy, or sometimes indirectly such as in x-ray crystallography or by computer imaging; at a wide range of magnifications to see macromolecules, cells, tissues, or organisms
- Mass spectrometry – technique that gives the molecular mass with great accuracy.
- Microscale Thermophoresis (MST) – method to measure binding affinities, enzymatic activities, changes in molecule conformation and changes in size, charge or hydration entropy.
- Microscopy – used in many ways, for example, to enable the use of laser instruments for scanning and transmission.
  - Atomic force microscopy –
- Neuroimaging –
- Neutron spin echo spectroscopy –
- Nuclear Magnetic Resonance Spectroscopy – method for measuring the local environment of atomic nuclei within a sample. Can be used to derive both structural and kinetic information on proteins and small molecules.
  - Protein NMR spectroscopy – provides information about the exact structure of biological molecules, as well as on dynamics
- Optical tweezers and magnetic tweezers – allow for the manipulation of single molecules, providing information about DNA and its interaction with proteins and molecular motors, such as Helicase and RNA polymerase.
- Rheology and Microrheology
- Single molecule spectroscopy – is a technique that is sensitive enough to detect single molecules and often incorporates fluorescence detection.
- Small angle X-ray scattering (SAXS) – technique that gives a rough low resolution molecular structure.
- Spectrophotometry – measurement of the transmission of light through different solutions or substances at different wavelengths of light.
  - Colorimetry –
- Spectroscopy and Circular dichroism – method for detecting chiral groups in molecules, especially to determine the secondary structure of proteins
- Ultracentrifugation – gives information on the shape and mass of molecules
- X-ray crystallography – method to determine the exact structure of molecules with atomic resolution

== Applications ==
- Biophysical profile

== Biophysical structures and phenomena ==
=== In molecular biophysics ===
- Molecular biophysics
- Biological membranes
- Cell membranes
- Bioenergetics
- Channels, receptors and transporters
- Enzyme kinetics
- Molecular motors
- Phospholipids
- Proteins
- Biofilms
- Supramolecular assemblies
- Nucleic acids

=== In cellular biophysics ===
- Cellular biology
- Cell division
- Cell migration
- Cell signalling
- Dynamical systems
- Electrophysiology
- Signaling
- Biochemical systems theory
- Metabolic control analysis

== Biophysics organizations ==
- American Crystallographic Association
- Biophysical Society
- Biophysical Society of Canada
- European Biophysical Societies' Association
- Indian Biophysical Society
- Institute of Biophysics (Chinese Academy of Sciences)
- International Union for Pure and Applied Biophysics
- International Union of Crystallography
- National Institute of Chemical Physics and Biophysics, Estonia

== Biophysics publications ==
- Annual Review of Biophysics
- Bibliography of biophysics
- Biochemical and Biophysical Research Communications
- Biophysical Journal
- Biophysical Reviews and Letters
- European Biophysics Journal
- Indian Journal of Biochemistry and Biophysics
- Journal of Biochemical and Biophysical Methods
- Soft Matter

== Persons influential in biophysics ==
- List of biophysicists

== See also ==
- Bioacoustics
- Biological membranes
- Bionics
- Computational biology
- Evolutionary algorithms
- Evolutionary computing
- Evolutionary theory
- Gravitational biology
- Ion channels
- Mathematical biology
- Morphogenesis
- Muscle and contractility
- Negentropy
- Neural encoding
- Neurophysics
- Physiomics
- Radiobiology
- Sensory systems
- Structural biology
- Systems neuroscience
- Tensegrity
- Theoretical biology
