= Frances Separovic =

Chemist

Professor Frances Separovic AO FAA
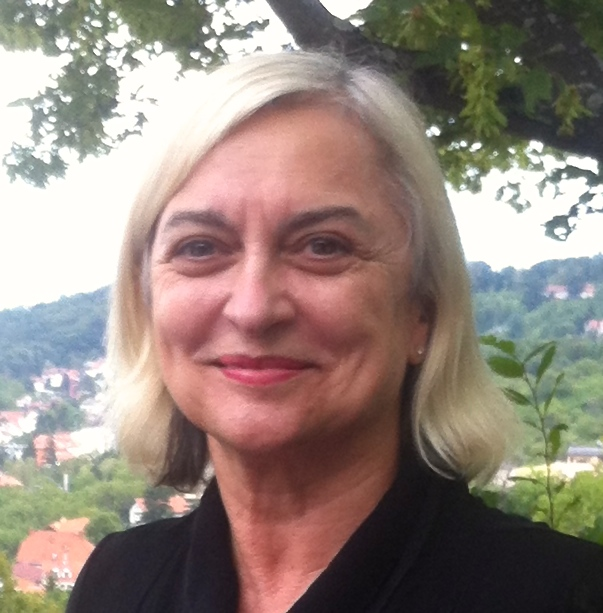
- Born: ~1954; Blato, Korcula, Croatia
- Known for: Solid-state nuclear magnetic resonance. Membrane biophysics.
- Scientific career
- Fields: Biophysical chemistry
- Workplaces: School of Chemistry; University of Melbourne; Australia

Frances Separovic AO FAA (born ~1954) is an Australian biophysical chemist. She is Distinguished Professor Emeritus of Chemistry at the University of Melbourne, where she taught physical chemistry and trained graduate students. She is credited with developing techniques that utilise nuclear magnetic resonance spectroscopy (NMR) to study peptides in lipid bilayers, with applications in the study of the structure of membrane proteins and their effects on membranes. Her more recent research concerns 'the structure and interactions of amyloid peptides from Alzheimer's disease, pore-forming toxins and antibiotic peptides in model biological membranes'.

== Early life ==
Franica Šeparović was born in the Federal People's Republic of Yugoslavia, People's Republic of Croatia and emigrated to Australia with her family in 1957. They settled in Broken Hill, western New South Wales. Separovic excelled in school and she was awarded both a Commonwealth and teacher's scholarship; she began tertiary studies at the University of Sydney, but soon left to work at the Commonwealth Scientific and Industrial Research Organisation (CSIRO). In addition to working full-time and studying part-time, Separovic was also a young mother.

== Early career and academic achievements ==
Separovic's career in science began as a Technical Assistant at a CSIRO microbiology lab (1972–78) 'counting colonies' and 'doing the washing up'. Adept at these basic tasks, she habitually finished her work early and went in search of more to do. Her capacity with mathematics recommended her to a group in the division involved in modelling lipid membranes and trying to discover why they leak. This was the project in which Separovic first encountered an NMR instrument – at the time (the 70s) a new technique – which played a major role in her research. It was here, too, that she made her first contribution to a scientific paper: using her aptitude for mathematics to determine via 'simple geometry' the smallest possible radius of a vesicle which it is possible to make (10-nanometers), solving a contemporaneous argument within the scientific community.

In 1978, Separovic completed a Technical Certificate in Biology at Sydney Technical College, and continued to work at the CSIRO as a Technical Officer while studying part-time on a Bachelor of Arts at Macquarie University, with majors in Mathematics and Physics. She completed her undergraduate degree in 1984, at which time she became an Experimental Scientist at CSIRO; in 1986 she finished an Honours qualification in Physics (also at Macquarie University). Between 1986 and 1992, as a single parent and while working full-time at the CSIRO, she completed a PhD (part-time) in Physics at the University of New South Wales. Following a post-doctoral fellowship at the National Institutes of Health (Bethesda, USA), Frances returned briefly to CSIRO before moving to the University of Melbourne as an Associate Professor & Reader in 1996.

== Later career and public recognition ==
In 2005, Separovic became the first woman to be appointed a full professor of chemistry in Victoria and was Head of School of Chemistry, University of Melbourne (2010–2016) and Deputy Director of the Bio21 Institute (2017-2023). She is currently Professor of Chemistry at the Bio21 Institute, and member of Advisory Committee of InterAcademy Partnership (AIP) and Executive Board of Association of Academies and Societies of Sciences in Asia (AASSA),, chair of Advisory Council of the International Science Council Regional Focal Point for Asia and the Pacific (ISC RFP-AP), and past-president of Division I (Physical & Biophysical Chemistry) of International Union of Pure and Applied Chemistry (IUPAC). Frances served as Foreign Secretary of the Australian Academy of Science, President of the Biophysical Society, a member of the Science Board of IUPAC and Council of International Union for Pure and Applied Biophysics (IUPAB), President of the Australian & New Zealand Magnetic Society for Resonance (ANZMAG), Treasurer of the Royal Australian Chemical Institute (RACI), President of the Australian Society for Biophysics, and chaired the board of the Centre for Chemistry and Biotechnology at Deakin University. She has been on the editorial board of Biochimica et Biophysica Acta, an editor of European Biophysics Journal and a member of the editorial advisory board of Accounts of Chemical Research and Chemical Reviews.

In 2012 Frances Separovic was made Fellow of the International Society for Magnetic Resonance (ISMAR), the Biophysical Society (USA) and the Australian Academy of Science – the first woman to be elected to the AAS in the field of chemistry. At the time, Separovic had published over 130 papers and successfully organized more than 25 conferences, which she has since more than doubled. Frances was one of twelve IUPAC Distinguished Women in Chemistry/Chemical Engineering awardees and received the University of New South Wales Alumni Award for Science & Technology in 2017, the Royal Australian Chemical Institute Margaret Sheil Leadership Award in 2019, the Rosalba Kampman Distinguished Service Award of the Biophysical Society in 2024, the Leach Lecture Medal of the Lorne Proteins Conference in 2025, and elected Fellow of the Royal Society of Victoria and the International Science Council in 2026.

In March 2018 Separovic was inducted into the Victorian Honour Roll of Women and, in February 2019, became Redmond Barry Distinguished Professor Emeritus at the University of Melbourne. Frances was appointed an Officer of the Order of Australia (AO) in the 2019 Queen's Birthday Honours for her "distinguished service to science education, particularly to biophysical chemistry, as an academic, and to young women scientists". On International Women's Day 2024, she received a Croatian Women of Influence (Science & Technology) award and in November 2024 was awarded Docteur Honoris Causa by University of Bordeaux.
