= Sheena Radford =

British biophysicist

Sheena Radford OBE, FRS, FMedSci, FRSB, MAE, NAS
- Born: Sheena Elizabeth Radford
- Education: University of Birmingham; University of Cambridge
- Spouse: Alan Berry
- Scientific career
- Fields: Biophysics; Structural biology; Protein folding
- Workplaces: University of Leeds; University of Oxford
- Thesis: Domains and conformational flexibility in the catalytic mechanism of the 2-oxo acid dehydrogenase complexes (1987)
- Website: https://biologicalsciences.leeds.ac.uk/biological-sciences/staff/127/professor-sheena-radford http://sheena-radford-lab.uk https://astbury.leeds.ac.uk/people/professor-sheena-radford/

Sheena Elizabeth Radford is a British biophysicist, and Astbury Professor of Biophysics and a Royal Society Research Professor in the Astbury Centre for Structural Molecular Biology, School of Molecular and Cellular Biology at the University of Leeds. Until December 2026, Radford was the associate editor of the Journal of Molecular Biology.

== Education ==
Radford received her BSc in Biochemistry at the University of Birmingham in 1984, and her PhD in Biochemistry at the University of Cambridge in 1987. Radford completed a post-doctoral fellowship at the University of Oxford.

== Career and research ==
Radford was a postdoc and Royal Society University Research Fellow at the University of Oxford, then worked as a Lecturer in Biochemistry and Molecular Biology at the University of Leeds in 1995, progressing to Reader in 1998 and Professor in 2000. She became the deputy director of the Astbury Centre for Structural Molecular Biology in 2009 then Director in 2012 - 2021. Radford's research investigates protein folding, protein aggregation and amyloid disease. Her multi-disciplinary research focuses include such disciplines as biochemistry, chemistry and medicine.

Radford has made important contributions to protein science, fundamentally advancing understanding of protein folding, misfolding and amyloid assembly, and opening new frontiers in bacterial outer membrane biogenesis. Her pioneering discovery that proteins fold through parallel pathways reshaped concepts of protein folding and led to the discovery that partially folded intermediates initiate amyloid formation, establishing a paradigm that has guided the field for almost three decades.

Since these landmark discoveries, Radford has delivered major advances in understanding the molecular basis of amyloid diseases, including Alzheimer’s, Parkinson’s and type II diabetes. Her work has revealed how amyloid fibrils form and evolve structurally and has contributed to work which portrayed the first structural visualisation of amyloid within the human Alzheimer brain. In parallel, she has transformed understanding of bacterial outer membrane protein assembly and quality control through her studies of the BAM complex and its associated chaperone networks, revealing fundamental mechanisms of how the outer membrane is built and creating new opportunities for antibiotic development.

Radford’s influence extends beyond her research. Through her leadership, mentorship and service to the protein science community she has helped developed the field and those who work within it.

== Awards and honours ==
- 1996, Biochemical Society Colworth Medal
- 2003, Fellow of the Royal Society of Chemistry
- 2005, Royal Society of Chemistry Astra-Zeneca prize in Proteins and Peptides
- 2007, Elected member of EMBO
- 2009, Ron Hites Award from the American Society for Mass Spectrometry (joint with Professor Alison Ashcroft)
- 2010, Fellow of the Academy of Medical Sciences (FMedSci) in 2010
- 2013, Protein Society Carl Brändén Award
- 2014, Fellow of the Royal Society (FRS)
- 2014, Honorary member of the British Biophysical Society
- 2015, Rita and John Cornforth Award of the Royal Society of Chemistry (joint with Professor Alison Ashcroft)
- 2018, Fellow of the Biophysical Society
- 2020, Officer of the Most Excellent Order of the British Empire (OBE)
- 2021, Royal Society Professorship
- 2021, Fellow of the Royal Society of Biology
- 2022, Doctorate honoris causa from the University of Liège
- 2024, International Member of the National Academy of Sciences, USA
- 2025, The Biochemical Society Centenary Award

Radford is a member of Faculty of 1000.

She was appointed Officer of the Order of the British Empire (OBE) in the 2020 Birthday Honours for services to molecular biology research.
