= Anthony Watts (biophysicist) =

British biophysicist

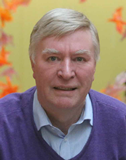
- Born: Hanover (Germany); 7 January 1950 (age 76)
- Education: University of Leeds
- Occupation: Biochemistry professor
- Known for: Membrane and Membrane Protein Biophysics
- Scientific career
- Thesis: Biophysical studies on phospholipid vesicles (1975)
- Doctoral advisor: Peter J. F. Knowles
- Website: https://www.bioch.ox.ac.uk/research/watts

Anthony Watts (born 7 January 1950) is a British biochemist and Professor of Biochemistry at the University of Oxford and C W Maplethorpe Fellow in Biological Sciences and tutor at St. Hugh's College, Oxford. He is a fellow of the Royal Chemical Society, the Institute of Physics, Royal Society of Biology and Biophysical Society. He was managing director of the European Biophysics Journal, and is a co-opted member of the European Biophysical Societies' Association (EBSA), chair of the British Biophysical Society and chair of the Scientific Committee for the IUPAB/EBSA/BBS/IoP Biophysics congress, 2017. He was President of EBSA (2017–2019) and elected President-elect of IUPAB in 2021.

== Education ==
Anthony Watts was educated at Knighton-upon-Teme Primary School (1954–1959); Tenbury Wells C of E Primary School(1959–1961) Ludlow School in Shropshire (1961–1968) and at the Astbury Department of Biophysics University of Leeds where he obtained his BSc (Hons) and subsequently his PhD in 1975.

== Research ==
Since his PhD, Tony Watts has had an interest in both model and biological membranes, using a wide range of biophysical methods to characterize vesicular, model, reconstituted and natural membranes. In early work, lipid-protein interactions were investigated exploiting ESR approaches to relate lipid dynamics to function. In Oxford, newly developed wide-line NMR was developed to characterize surface specificity of lipid-protein and peptide interactions in membranes. More recently, novel solid state NMR approaches have been developed and exploited to resolve high resolution conformational and dynamic details directly of ligand-targets interactions in the absence of target structure, with GPCRs being the current focus. He has published using a wide range of biophysical methodologies, with a focus on understanding structural explanation of biological function – https://scholar.google.com/citations?user=dsSTSaIAAAAJ

== Awards and honours ==
2025, Dimitrie Cantemir Medal at the Academy of Sciences of Moldova; 2024, Hon Member, Hungarian Biophysical Society; 2015 Royal Society of Chemistry Interdisciplinary Prize ; 2015 Biophysical Society Anantrace Membrane Protein Award and Prize; XXV Godnev Annual Lecture and Award, National Academy of Sciences, Belarus (2014); “Frontiers in Sciences” Lecturer (2008), Texas A&M University, USA; Distinguished Professor, Kyun-won University, Seoul, Korea (2004); International Advisor, Korea Research Institute of Bioscience and Biotechnology (KRIBB) (2004 on); Hascoe Medal Lecturer, University of Connecticut, USA (2004); Royal Society of Chemistry Award for Biomembrane Chemistry for 2001; Moses Gomberg Lecturer, University of Michigan, USA (2001); Wilsmore Fellowship to the School of Chemistry, University of Melbourne, Australia (2000); The 1998 ANZMAG Lecturer; The Biochemical Society (UK) Morton Lecturer (1999); The Pfizer Lecture, University of Sheffield (1992); SERC-CNRS Maxime Hanss Prize for Biophysics (1992); Fulbright Scholarship (1987–88); 350th Commemorative Medal, Helskini University, Finland (1990).
