= Dan Eley =

British chemist

Dan Eley OBE FRS FRSC
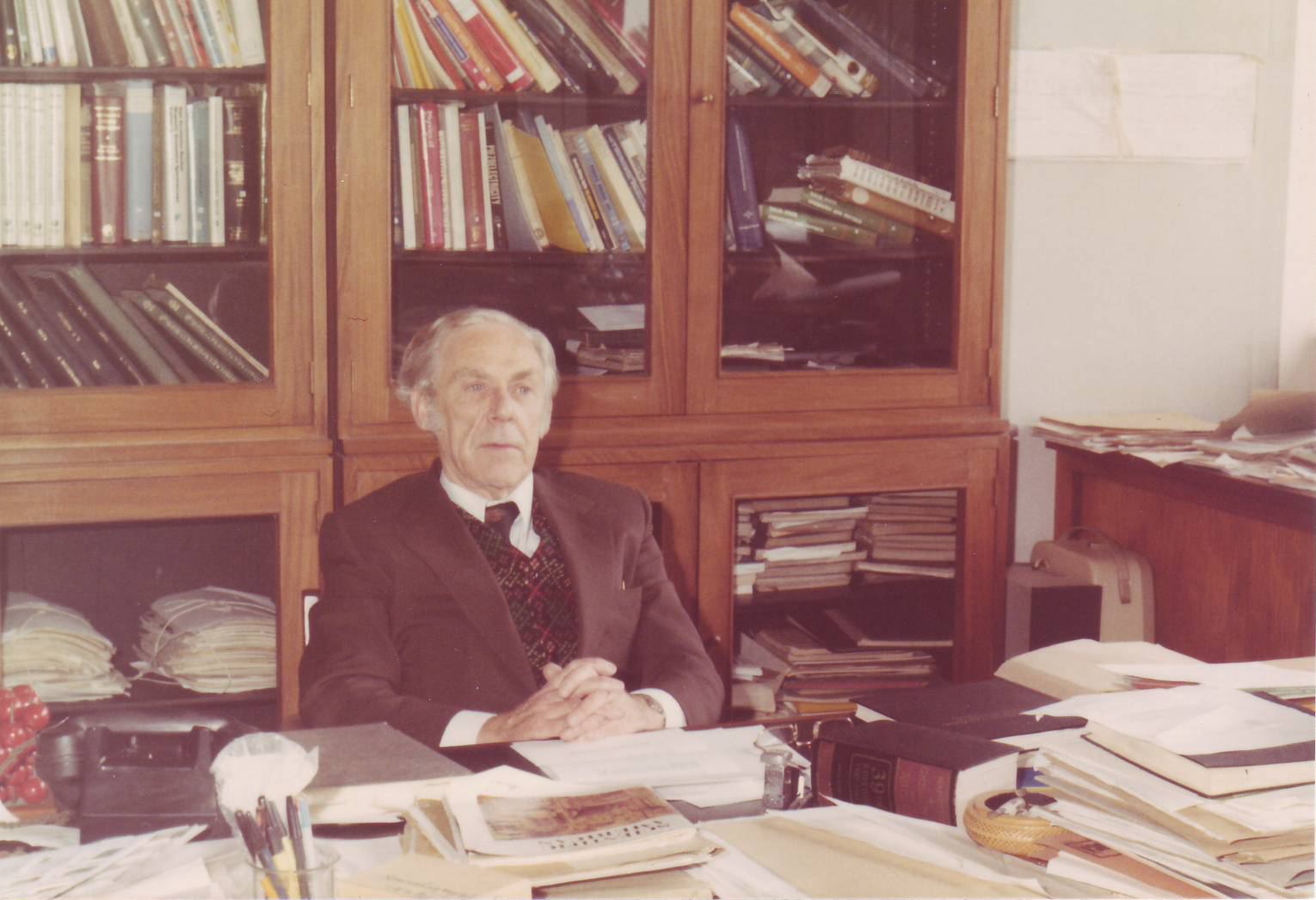
- Dan Eley at his desk at the University of Nottingham in 1980
- Born: Daniel Douglas Eley; 1 October 1914
- Died: 3 September 2015 (aged 100); Nottingham
- Citizenship: British
- Education: Manchester University
- Awards: Officer of the Order of the British Empire (1961); Fellow of the Royal Society (1964)
- Scientific career
- Workplaces: University of Nottingham; University of Bristol; St John's College, Cambridge

Daniel Douglas Eley (1 October 1914 – 3 September 2015) was a British chemist and Professor of Physical Chemistry at the University of Nottingham. He is known for the Eley–Rideal mechanism in surface chemistry.

== Biography ==
Eley obtained a BSc in Chemistry from the University of Manchester in 1934, and an MSc in 1935. He studied for a PhD with Michael Polanyi which he obtained in 1937, but then moved to St John's College, Cambridge where he undertook a second PhD with Eric Rideal which he obtained in 1940.

In 1945 he was appointed to a Lectureship in Colloid Science at the University of Bristol and was promoted to a Readership in Biophysical Chemistry in 1951. In 1954 he was appointed to be the first Professor of Physical Chemistry at the University of Nottingham. In 1961 he was made an Officer of the Order of the British Empire (OBE), and in 1964 he was elected as a Fellow of the Royal Society.

== Academic career ==
Eley was instrumental in the development of the School of Chemistry at the University of Nottingham (formerly the Department of Chemistry). Together with Alan Johnson and Cliff Addison (Professors of Organic and Inorganic Chemistry, respectively) he oversaw the construction of a new Chemistry building in 1960.

Eley worked in a variety of areas including heterogeneous catalysis, organic semiconductors, molecular sieves, photochemistry and radiation chemistry, X-ray crystallography, equilibria in solution, colloids and interfaces and magnetic properties of materials. He maintained links with industry, and money from ICI was used to set up a Centre for Colloid Science in the Chemistry Department. He was a founder member of the British Biophysical Society. He ran a large research group and published over 250 papers, some of which have been highly cited and a number of which are single author. Eley retired in 1980, but continued to collaborate with colleagues in the department, and to publish articles.

Professor Eley worked with Sir Eric Rideal studying catalysts, especially the industrially-important reaction between hydrogen compounds containing carbon-carbon double bonds. These experiments led to the discovery of the mechanism for this reaction: the Eley–Rideal reaction. He also conducted work on DNA demonstrating that molecules of DNA can conduct electricity, important for understanding how DNA can be damaged. During this time he also tutored Rosalind Franklin.

In honour of his 90th birthday in 2004, the journal Nature presented him with a lifetime subscription. He celebrated his 100th birthday on 1 October 2014. On 29 October 2014, the University of Nottingham hosted an event in the School of Chemistry to mark his centenary, in which he was also presented with a certificate marking the 50th anniversary of his election to the Royal Society and a Royal Society of Chemistry blue plaque.
