= International Union for Pure and Applied Biophysics =

International non-governmental organization

International Union of Pure and Applied Biophysics
- Abbreviation: IUPAB
- Formation: 1961; 65 years ago
- Type: INGO
- Region served: Worldwide
- Members: ICSU
- Official language: English
- President: Manuel Prieto
- Website: iupab.org

The International Union for Pure and Applied Biophysics (IUPAB) is an international non-governmental organization whose mission is to assist in the worldwide development of biophysics, to foster international cooperation in biophysics, and to help in the application of biophysics toward solving problems of concern to all humanity. It was established in 1961 as the International Organisation for Pure and Applied Biophysics but then renamed as the International Union in 1966, when it became a member of ICSU ( the International Council of Scientific Unions), which itself was renamed in 2018 as ISC, the International Council for Science. Affiliated to it are the national adhering bodies of 61 countries, as well as the European Biophysical Societies' Association (EBSA), the Asian Biophysics Association and the Biophysical Society.

IUPAB carries out its mission by: sponsoring international meetings and its own congresses triennially; fostering communications and publications; encouraging research and education; fostering the free circulation of scientists; and cooperating with other organizations on multi-disciplinary and inter-disciplinary problems.

== History ==
The first General Assembly of IOPAB (International Organisation for Pure and Applied Biophysics) and the first International Biophysics Congress were held in Stockholm in 1961 with over 1000 delegates attending. They were followed by a second General Assembly of IOPAB in Paris in 1964 and, two years later in 1966, IOPAB was admitted to the International Council of Scientific Unions (ICSU) which became the International Council for Science (ICS) in 2018. In 1966 at the Vienna congress that IOPAB became IUPAB (International Union for Pure and Applied Biophysics).

Since 1966, IUPAB has hosted a Congress every three years: Boston MIT in 1969, Moscow in 1972, Copenhagen in 1975, Kyoto in 1978, Mexico City in 1981, Bristol in 1984, Jerusalem in 1987, Vancouver in 1990, Budapest in 1993, Amsterdam in 1996, New Delhi in 1999, Buenos Aires in 2002, Montpellier in 2005, Long Beach, California in 2008, Beijing in 2011, Brisbane in 2014, Edinburgh in 2017 (jointly with EBSA and Brazil Iguazu in 2020 (delayed to 2021 and online due to the COVID-19 pandemic).

The next IUPAB Congress will take place in Kyoto in 2024.

== Committees and governance ==
IUPAB is governed by an executive committee which includes five key Officers: a President, a Past-President, a President -Elect, a Secretary General and a Treasurer. In addition to the executive committee, 12 Ordinary Members constitute the Council which meets twice a year. Both the Officers and the Ordinary Members serve for three years (with the option to renew for one more term, or be elected to the Executive) and the Secretary General and Treasurer serve for six years and the other Officers and the Ordinary Members serve for three years (with the option to renew for one more term, or be elected to the Executive)".

In addition to the Executive Committee, IUPAB has five task force committees which focus on different areas: Meeting Committee, Structural Biology, Publications, Educations and Capacity Building and Big Data.

== Conferences and activities ==
IUPAB holds a congress every three years (either in person or via on-line platform). During the congress a General Assembly of delegates discusses and co-ordinates the interests of the various branches of Biophysics, as well as electing Officers. Workshops, specialist meetings, and sponsorship of various activities related to Biophysics are also organized. Several lectures at relevant meetings are also sponsored by IUPAB. Some 60 bursaries for younger scientists are also awarded for the IUPAB Congress, and travel fellowships are awarded for laboratory exchanges. IUPAB also makes two awards, a Young Investigator Award, and a Senior (Avanti) award.

Biophysical reviews is the journal of IUPAB published by Springer Nature.

== Adhering bodies and societies ==
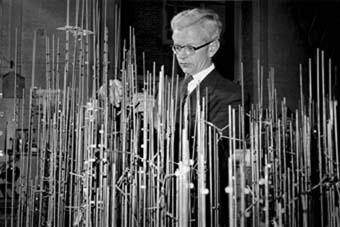
John Kendrew, a former IUPAB President, constructing a model of myoglobin

The IUPAB International Union consists of a group of Adhering Bodies representing Scientific Communities. Adhering Bodies such as Research Councils, National Academies of Science or similar institutions, or scientific Societies can apply for membership of IUPAB. There are several levels of subscriptions that will grant each adhering body representation at the General Assembly with one or more voting members depending on the option selected.

So far adhering bodies from 61 different countries have joined IUPAB.

== List of presidents ==
1961-1964	Arne Engstrom	Sweden
1964-1969	Aharon Katzir-Katchalsky	Israel
1969-1972	Feodor Lynen	Germany
1972-1975	John C Kendrew	UK
1975-1978	Britton Chance	USA
1978-1981	Setsuro Ebashi	Japan
1981-1984	Richard D Keynes	UK
1984-1987	Bernard Pullman	France
1987-1990	Lee D Peachey	USA
1990-1993	Maurizio Bruroni	Italy
1993-1996	Herman J C Berendsen	The Netherlands
1996-1999	David A D Parry	New Zealand
1999-2002	Israel Pecht	Israel
2002-2005	Jean Garnier	France
2005-2008	I C P Smith	Canada
2008-2011	Kuniaki Nagayama	Japan
2011-2014	Gordon Roberts	UK
2014-2017	Zhie Rao	China
2017-2021	Marcelo Morales	Brazil
2021-2024	Manuel Prieto	Portugal
2024-2027	Anthony Watts	UK
2024-2027	Angela Gronenborn	USA
