= Anthony Watts =

Anthony Watts may refer to:

- Anthony Watts (blogger) (born 1958), American broadcast meteorologist and editor of the blog Watts Up With That?
- Anthony Watts (rugby league) (born 1986), Australian rugby league player for the Sydney Roosters
- Anthony Watts (biophysicist), British biochemist
- Anthony Brian Watts (born 1945), British marine geologist and geophysicist
