= Frank C. Cook IV =

Frank Cummings Cook IV
- Born: June 9, 1963; Bethesda, Maryland, US
- Died: August 19, 2009 (aged 46); Asheville, North Carolina, US
- Occupation: Alternative health practitioner
- Website: Plants and Healers International

Frank C. Cook (June 9, 1963 – August 19, 2009) was an American alternative health practitioner who traveled the world studying plants, and the teachings of various alternative health traditions, while offering classes.

== Personal life ==
Cook died of an advanced case of neurocysticercosis, a parasitic condition caused by the consumption of unclean food and water.

== Teaching ==
From the late 1990s until his death, Cook studied and taught with a range of well-known plant teachers including: Dr. James A. Duke, 7Song, Doug Elliott, Alan Muskat, Juliet Blankespoor, Chuck Marsh, Christopher Hobbs, CoreyPine Shane, Greenlight, Daniel Nicholson, John Olmstead, and Sandor Katz.

Cook also taught at the Appalachia School of Holistic Herbalism in Asheville, NC as well as online classes using the book Botany in a Day, workshops abroad and led plant walks at Wild Roots and Rainbow Gatherings.

=== Green Path ===
Cook also taught at yearly Rainbow Gatherings and founded Green Path in 2006.

== Travel ==
Frank Cook journeyed to numerous countries, such as Costa Rica, Southern Africa, Peru, Australia, New Zealand, and Japan. In his pursuit to connect with over 5,000 plant genera with which he felt intuitively linked, he experienced some of nature's most dangerous challenges, including malaria, and eventually the parasite that caused his fatal case of neurocysticercosis.

== Publications ==
- Betsy Breaks her Nose
- If Six Became Nine
- Toothpick Heaven
- A Baker's Dozen
- Plants and Healers of India and Nepal
- Plants and Healers of Peru and Ecuador
- Plants and Healers of South Africa
- Emerging Planetary Medicine
- He was also a contributor to the cookbook Kind Veggie Burritos
