= Lello Zolla =

Italian molecular biologist

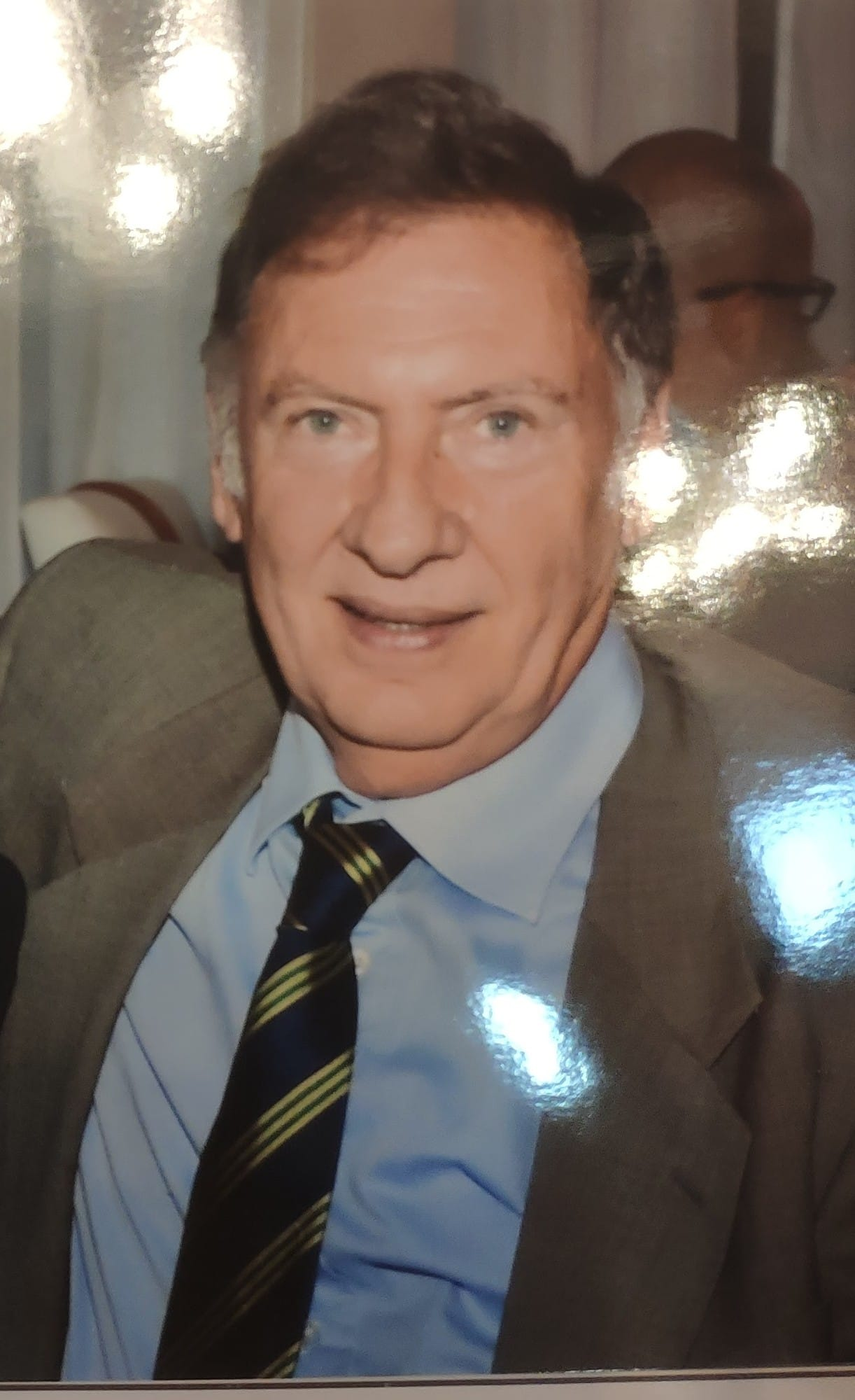
- Born: 1948 (age 77–78)
- Citizenship: Italy
- Known for: Proteomics, Metabolomics, Chromatography, mass spectrometry
- Scientific career
- Workplaces: University of Tuscia, University of Camerino, Sapienza University of Rome

Lello Zolla (born 1948) is an Italian molecular biologist and researcher. He served as a professor at the Department of Ecological and Biological Sciences (DEB) at the University of Tuscia, Viterbo. He has worked in proteomics and metabolomics, particularly employing mass spectrometry and chromatography in the study of biological systems.

== Academic career ==
Zolla began his scientific career in 1974 at the Sapienza University of Rome, collaborating with Eraldo Antonini and Maurizio Brunori, focusing on allosteric mechanisms in respiratory proteins such as hemoglobin and hemocyanin.

In 1986, Zolla became a Professor of Biochemistry at the University of Camerino, where he held the Chair of Biochemistry in Pharmacy and directed the High School of Chemistry and Clinical Biochemistry (1986–1991). He has also been a professor of Molecular Biology at the University of Tuscia, within the Department of Ecological and Biological Sciences.

== Scientific activity ==
Zolla is the author of scientific publications which focus on the application of omics technologies to human health and environmental studies. In particular:

- Study applying metabolomic profiling to identify potential biomarkers for treatment decisions in male hypogonadism.
- Studies on red blood cell storage lesions, employing proteomic and metabolomic approaches to characterize metabolic and oxidative changes occurring during blood storage.
- Study on urinary metabolomics in Italian children with autism spectrum disorder, reporting alterations in tryptophan and purine metabolism.
- Contributions to space biology, including studies on the effects of microgravity on mitochondrial structure and function in human osteoblasts.
- Study on the improvement of meat tenderness through integrated omics analysis identifying specific biomarkers.

Zolla is a member of the editorial board of the Journal of Proteomics and he guest-edited several special issues. He was among the founding members of the Italian Proteomic Society and the Italian Proteomic Association (ItPA).

In the late 1990s, he started research on plant proteomics and the effects of heavy metals on plant metabolism and the role of heat shock proteins, employing two-dimensional gels and capillary electrophoresis. Since 2001, Zolla's group has implemented advanced chromatographic methods (nanoLC, 2D-LC) coupled with mass spectrometry for omics studies. His group has collaborated with the Italian National Blood Centre (Centro Nazionale Sangue) on research aimed at improving the quality and safety of stored blood for transfusion. The outcome of this partnership is the review article "Classic and alternative red blood cell storage strategies: seven years of 'omics' investigations," co-authored with Angelo D'Alessandro and Grazzini, which summarizes a seven‑year research effort into proteomic and metabolomic profiling of stored red blood cells to optimize storage protocols and mitigate oxidative damage.

== Research techniques ==
In his research, Zolla has employed proteomic and metabolomic approaches combined with techniques such as liquid chromatography and mass spectrometry for the characterization of biological samples.
