= EBJ =

EBJ may refer to:

- Esbjerg Airport in Denmark
- European Biophysics Journal
- Canadian Tabby Cat
- Eddie Bernice Johnson, United States Congresswoman from Texas
