= Alan Woodworth Johnson =

English organic chemist (1917–1982)

Alan Woodworth Johnson FRS (20 September 1917 – 5 December 1982) was a British professor of biochemistry.

== Education ==
Born in South Shields, Alan W. Johnson grew up near Newcastle-upon-Tyne and, with the aid of scholarship, attended Morpeth Grammar School (now known as King Edward VI School, Morpeth). From 1933 to 1936 he was a worker with low pay and attended evening classes. By means of a Royal Scholarship, he matriculated in 1936 at Imperial College London, where he graduated with a bachelor's degree in 1938 and, with the aid of a University Scholarship, earned a Ph.D. in 1940. His Ph.D. thesis was supervised by Ewart Jones.

== Career ==
In late 1940 Johnson was recruited by Imperial Chemical Industries (ICI) and put on ICI's payroll as an assistant (at Imperial College London) to Ian Heilbron on a vitamin A synthesis project. In 1942 Johnson went to work in ICI"s Dyestuffs Division in Blackley (an area of Manchester). During the remainder of WW II he worked on acetylenic compounds, because of the possibilities of using acetylene as a starting material for synthetic rubber via butadiene as an intermediary.

In 1946 he joined Alexander R. Todd's team at the University of Cambridge as an ICI Fellow and in 1951 became a Fellow of Christ's College, Cambridge. During Johnson's years at Cambridge he worked on the biochemistry of various natural products, including vitamin B_{12}, tropolones, aphid pigments, and plant germination factors. In 1955 he was appointed to the Jesse Boot Chair of Organic Chemistry, as successor to Frederick Ernest King (1905–1999), and the headship of the University of Nottingham's chemistry department. Together with Daniel Douglas Eley and Cyril Clifford Addison, he designed and oversaw the construction of a new chemistry building, which opened in 1960. In the 1960s, some biochemists and projects were transferred from the University of Cambridge to the University of Nottingham. After working on studies of vitamin B_{12}, synthesis of porphyrin and corrin, and the structures of the phytochemicals primisterin and maytenone, Johnson resigned from the University of Nottingham in 1968. From 1968 to 1982, as the successor of A. Ian Scott, he was a professor of organic chemistry at the University of Sussex and director of the ARC Unit of insect chemistry and physiology. At the University of Sussex he worked on insect pheromones and biochemistry related to weevils of the genus Scolytus, which transmit the fungus that causes Dutch elm disease, and possibilities for biocontrol of the weevils as vectors of the fungus. He gave popular lectures on Sex and Violence in the Insect World to chemistry departments across the UK. In 1982 he retired as professor emeritus but died suddenly about two months after his retirement.

== Personal life ==
In 1941 Alan W. Johnson married Lucy Bennett. They had two children.

== Awards and honours ==
Johnson was awarded in 1946 the Meldola Medal and Prize. In 1953 he received the Tilden Prize and gave his Tilden Lecture on Aromaticity in seven-membered ring systems. He was elected in 1965 a Fellow of the Royal Society. He received the Royal Society of Chemistry's 1971 Synthetic Organic Chemistry Award. From 1977 to 1978 he was the president of the Royal Society of Chemistry. In 1980 he received both the Robert Robinson Award and the Davy Medal. Upon his retirement in 1982, the Royal Society of Chemistry held a symposium in his honor.

== Selected publications ==
- The Chemistry of the Acetylenic Compounds. E. Arnold. 1946. 2 vols.; vol. 1 The Acetylenic Alcohols; vol. 2 The Acetylenic Acids; 2nd edition 1950
- Lecture on some applications of acetylenic compounds in organic synthesis. London: The Royal Institute of Chemistry of Great Britain and Ireland. 1948. LCCN 49026413; 18 pages; illustrated; Meldola Medal lecture delivered to the Royal Institute of Chemistry on 17 October 1947; revised and extended by the author
- The Art of Organic Chemistry. The University of Nottingham. Sir Jesse Boot Foundation lecture, 1956–57. 1957. LCCN 57040486; 20 pages, illustrated
