= Olwyn Byron =

British physicist

- Education: University of Nottingham; University of Aberdeen; Durham University
- Awards: Rosalind Franklin Medal and Prize (2020)
- Scientific career
- Workplaces: University of Glasgow
- Thesis: Solution studies on the conformation and assembly of the monoclonal antibody B72.3. (1992)

Olwyn Byron is a British physicist who is Professor of Biophysics at the University of Glasgow and Chair of the British Biophysical Society. She is a member of the Physics of Life UK Network steering group who were awarded the 2020 Institute of Physics Rosalind Franklin Medal and Prize.

== Education ==
Byron was an undergraduate student at Durham University. She moved to the University of Aberdeen as a graduate student, where she earned a master's degree in medical physics. Byron moved to the University of Nottingham, where her doctoral research considered structure-property investigations into B72.3.

== Research and career ==
In 1992, Byron joined the faculty at the University of Leicester, where she worked in applied bimolecular technology. She joined the University of Glasgow in 1997 and was promoted to Professor in 2016.

Byron studies the solution behaviour of macromolecules and complexes. She is interested in the solution shape of molecules and the strength of the complexes that they form. She serves on the steering group of the Physics of Life network, a team of biologists and physicists who look to develop a comprehensive understanding of biological processes across multiple length scales, from molecules to systems. Byron was elected Chair of the British Biophysical Society in 2018.

== Awards and honours ==
- 2020 Institute of Physics Rosalind Franklin Medal and Prize Physics of Life UK Network (PoLNET) steering group

== Selected publications ==
- Joao H. Morais-Cabral; Petosa C; Mike Sutcliffe; et al. (1 August 1996). "Crystal structure of a PDZ domain". Nature. 382 (6592): 649–652. doi:10.1038/382649a0. ISSN 1476-4687. PMID 8757139. Wikidata Q27733300.
- B Short; C Preisinger; R Körner; R Kopajtich; O Byron; Francis A. Barr (10 December 2001). "A GRASP55-rab2 effector complex linking Golgi structure to membrane traffic". Journal of Cell Biology. 155 (6): 877–883. doi:10.1083/jcb.200108079. ISSN 0021-9525. PMC 2150909. PMID 11739401. Wikidata Q24291984.
- Myszka DG; Abdiche YN; Arisaka F; et al. (1 December 2003). "The ABRF-MIRG'02 study: assembly state, thermodynamic, and kinetic analysis of an enzyme/inhibitor interaction". Journal of Biomolecular Techniques. 14 (4): 247–269. ISSN 1524-0215. PMC 2279960. PMID 14715884. Wikidata Q36519362.
- Rocco. M., Brookes, E. and Byron, O (2021) US-SOMO: methods for the construction and hydration of macromolecular hydrodynamic models. Encyclopaedic of Biophysics, G. C. K. Roberts and A. Watts eds., Springer (doi: 10:1007/978-3-642-35943-9_292-1).
