= Karen Fleming =

Biophysicist

Karen G. Fleming
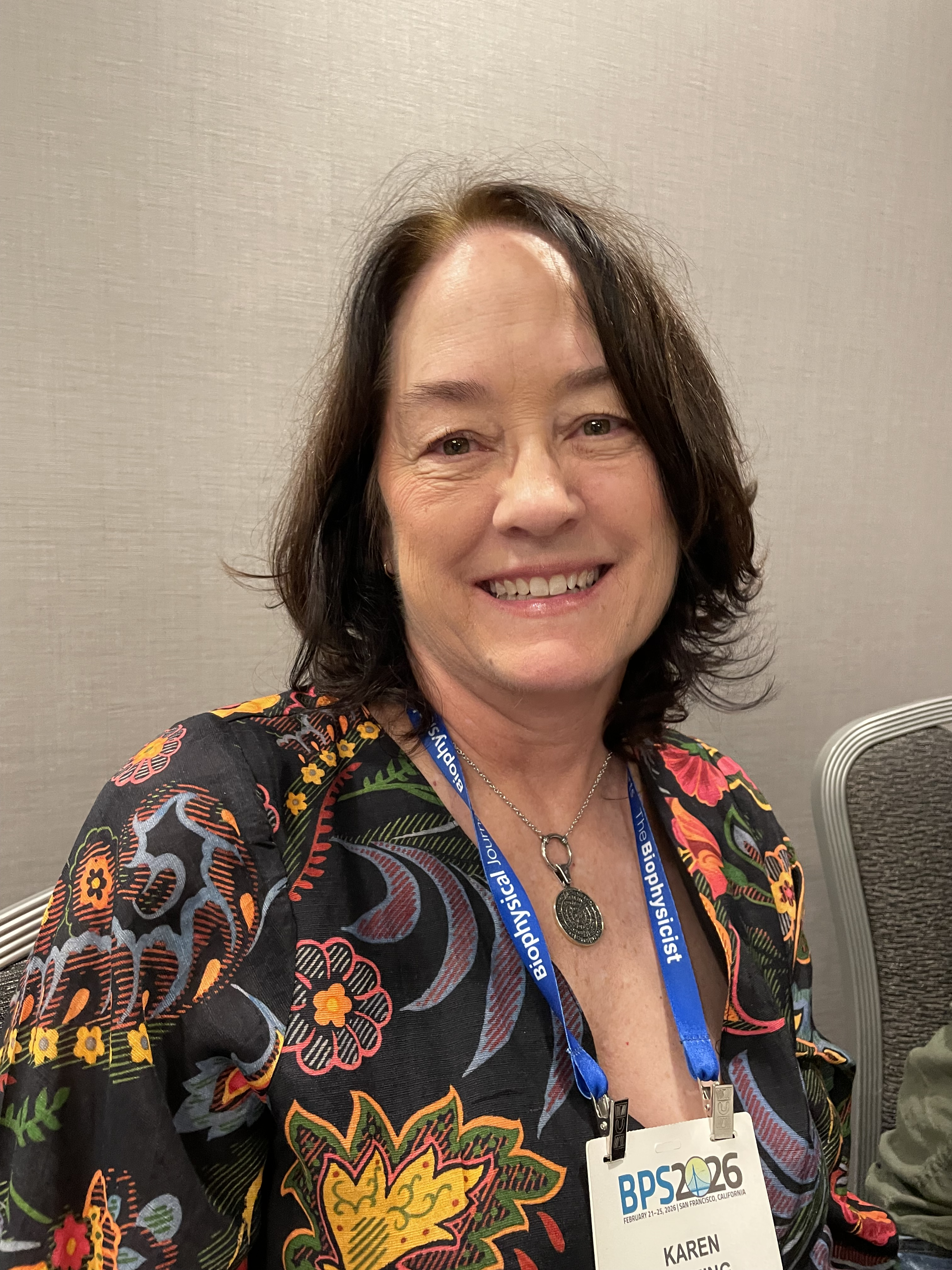
- Scientist Karen Fleming at the 2026 Biophysical Society Meeting
- Born: Karen Renee Gibson
- Education: Georgetown University; University of Notre Dame
- Scientific career
- Workplaces: Johns Hopkins University
- Thesis: Expression of dopamine beta-hydroxylase in drosophila Schneider 2 cells : evidence for a mechanism of membrane binding other than uncleaved signal peptide (1983)
- Website: Fleming Lab

Karen Renee Gibson Fleming is a Professor of Biophysics at Johns Hopkins University. She investigates the energetics of transmembrane helix-helix interactions. Fleming was awarded the 2020 Protein Society Carl Brändén Award and is the 2026 president of the Biophysical Society.

== Early life and education ==
Fleming grew up in a family of doctors and nurses, and decided to study medicine at university. She eventually studied French and pre-medical studies at the University of Notre Dame. She realised that she did not like blood, so moved into scientific research instead. After graduating Fleming attended the Catholic University of the West, where she studied French language and culture, before moving to Washington, D.C. to work at the Embassy of Morocco. Fleming missed scientific research, and decided to work toward a doctorate at Georgetown University. Her PhD focussed on molecular biology and during her research she became increasingly interested in proteins. Fleming was a postdoctoral researcher at Yale University, where she worked with Donald Engelman in the Department of Molecular Biophysics. Here she investigated the interaction of transmembrane alpha helices.

== Research and career ==
In 2000 Fleming started her research laboratory at Johns Hopkins University. She continued to study the interactions of transmembrane helices, as well as investigating beta barrels. Her work on beta barrels allowed her research group to significantly increase the number of known membrane protein stabilities. She created a hydrophobicity scale to describe protein side-chains. Fleming performed some of the first measurements of the thermodynamics of protein folding. She developed a theoretical framework to describe the association of helices. In 2010 Fleming served as president of the Gibbs Society of Biological Thermodynamics. Fleming uses her understanding of protein interactions to monitor the maturation of human microorganisms.

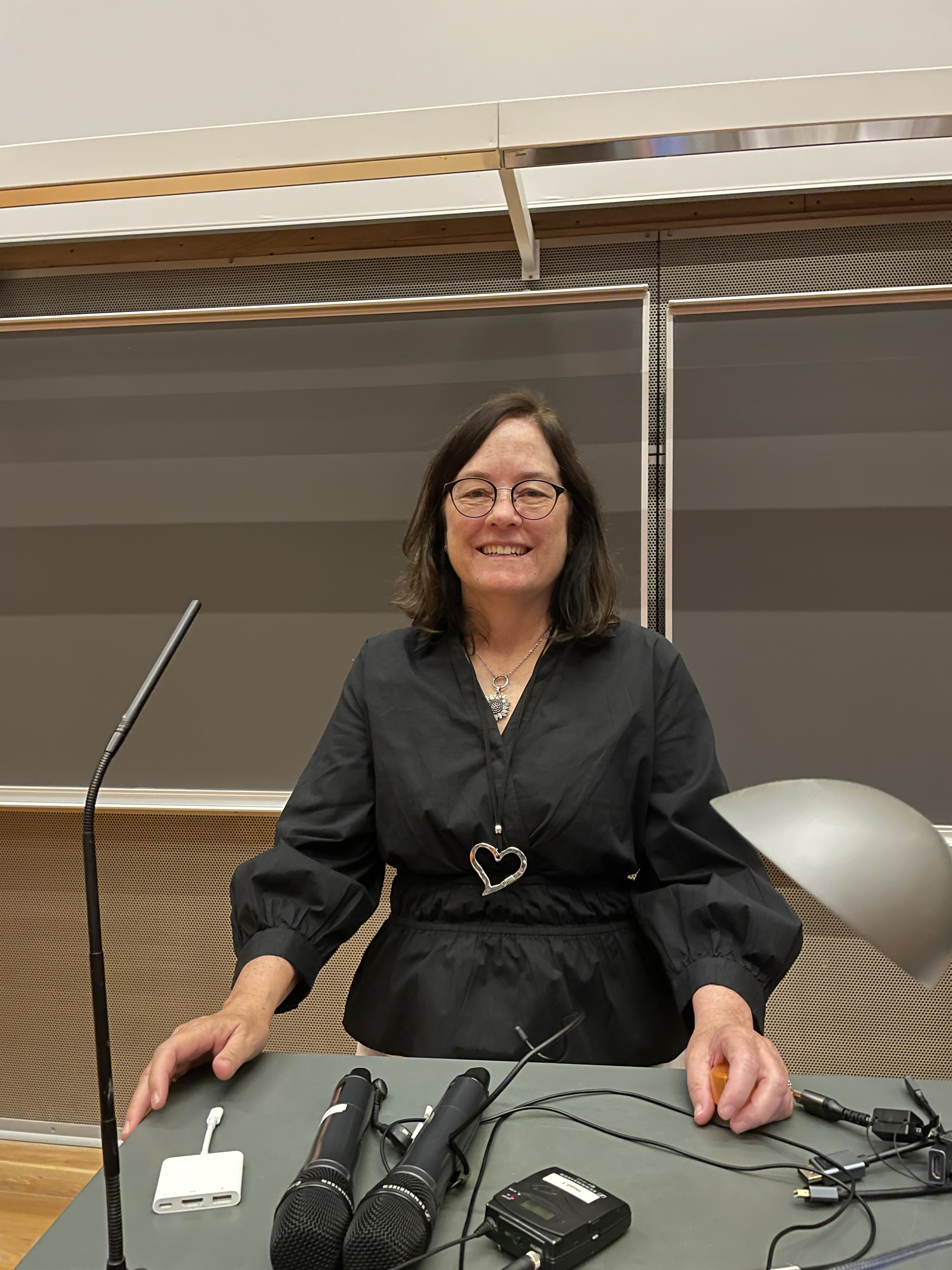
Fleming preparing to give an invited lecture titled "The Lipid Bilayer Modulates Membrane Protein Energetics" at a Biophysical Society Thematic Meeting in Copenhagen, Denmark on 9 July 2025

=== Leadership ===
Fleming is the 2026 president of the Biophysical Society and served as its president-elect from 2025-2026. She was honored with the inaugural Sharona Gordon Award by the Society of General Physiologists, named in honor for Sharona Gordon for "extraordinary commitment to promoting equity and inclusivity in the physiology and biophysics community".

Fleming also runs workshops on diversity and bias. During the workshops, she discusses social science literature on gender bias and discrimination. The workshops evolved into workshops that cover confidence, the power of bystanders and positive actions that people can take to improve the research community.

Fleming also maintains the blog Inclusive Excellence', which discusses initiatives to empower women scientists. She was a founder of the Women of Hopkins exhibition, which profiled women members of faculty at Johns Hopkins University. She serves as Co-Chair of the Homewood Campus of Johns Hopkins University Women Faculty Forum.

Fleming is an Associate Editor of the Journal of Biological Chemistry.

=== Awards and honours ===
Her awards and honours include:

- 2015 Diversity Leadership Council Award
- 2015 Chair of the Gordon Research Conference on Membrane Folding
- 2016 Biophysical Society Thomas E. Thompson Award
- 2019 Johns Hopkins University Provost's Prize for Faculty Excellence in Diversity
- 2020 Protein Society Carl Brändén Award
- 2020 Society of General Physiologists Sharona Gordon Award
- 2020-2021 Phi Beta Kappa Visiting Scholar
- 2022 Biophysical Society Fellow
- 2023 Biophysical Society Avanti Award in Lipids

=== Selected publications ===
- Fleming, Karen G; Ackerman, Anne L; Engelman, Donald M (1997). "The effect of point mutations on the free energy of transmembrane α-helix dimerization". Journal of Molecular Biology. 272 (2): 266–275. doi:10.1006/jmbi.1997.1236. ISSN 0022-2836. PMID 9299353.
- Moon, C. Preston; Fleming, Karen G. Side-chain hydrophobicity scale derived from transmembrane protein folding into lipid bilayers. National Academy of Sciences. OCLC 811395678.
- Fleming, Karen G.; Engelman, Donald M. (2001). "Specificity in transmembrane helix–helix interactions can define a hierarchy of stability for sequence variants". Proceedings of the National Academy of Sciences. 98 (25): 14340–14344. Bibcode:2001PNAS...9814340F. doi:10.1073/pnas.251367498. PMC 64683. PMID 11724930.
