= Cainey =

Settlement in Worcestershire, England

Cainey is a settlement in the civil parish of Knighton on Teme in the English county of Worcestershire. Its name is first attested around 1230–40 as Caweneie, etymologised by Allen Mawer and Frank Stenton as an Old English personal name Caua compounded with the noun eg, here meaning 'low marshy ground'. Alaric Hall later suggested that the name contained an Old English common noun cawa, meaning "jackdaw" or "corvid". If so, the name once meant "jackdaws' marsh".
