= Biophysical chemistry =

Field of Study

A ribosome is a biological machine that utilizes protein dynamics on nanoscales to translate RNA into proteins

Biophysical chemistry is a physical science that uses the concepts of physics and physical chemistry for the study of biological systems. The most common feature of the research in this subject is to seek an explanation of the various phenomena in biological systems in terms of either the molecules that make up the system or the supra-molecular structure of these systems. Apart from the biological applications, recent research showed progress in the medical field as well.

== History ==
=== Twentieth Century ===
==== Germany ====
The oldest concept of biophysical chemistry started from the curiosity of Karl Friedrich Bonhoeffer, a physical chemist who wanted to approach biological and physiological problems with knowledge of physics and chemistry. One example of his work is studying the effect of electric current on iron to simulate nerve excitations. After the establishment of fundamental biophysical chemistry in Göttingen, Manfred Eigen, the German Nobel Laureate developed it further. In 1971, he improved the research focus by merging two institutes, physical chemistry, and spectroscopy. Nowadays, the research in biophysical chemistry in Göttingen aims to discover life processes using the combined knowledge of science.

==== Netherlands ====
The renowned scientist, Herman Berendsen launched a research group at the University of Groningen focused on using NMR to monitor water and protein in biological systems. The study expands the structural understanding of water bonding which explains a lot of phenomena.

=== Modern history ===
Current approaches to biophysical research include but are not limited to the study of ion channels, promoters, stem cells, and the detection and analysis of biomolecules.

== Techniques ==
Biophysical chemists employ various techniques used in physical chemistry to probe the structure of biological systems. These techniques include spectroscopic methods such as nuclear magnetic resonance (NMR) and other techniques like X-ray diffraction and cryo-electron microscopy. An example of research in biophysical chemistry includes the work for which the 2009 Nobel Prize in Chemistry was awarded. The prize was based on X-ray crystallographic studies of the ribosome that helped to unravel the physical basis of its biological function as a molecular machine that translates mRNA into polypeptides. Other areas in which biophysical chemists engage themselves are protein structure and the functional structure of cell membranes. For example, enzyme action can be explained in terms of the shape of a pocket in the protein molecule that matches the shape of the substrate molecule or its modification due to binding of a metal ion. The structures of many large protein assemblies, such as ATP synthase, also exhibit machine-like dynamics as they act on their substrates. Similarly, the structure and function of the biomembranes may be understood through the study of model supramolecular structures as liposomes or phospholipid vesicles of different compositions and sizes.

== Applications ==
There are several biological and medical applications that apply the knowledge of biophysical chemistry to benefit humankind.

=== Study of Cell Membrane ===
Lipid bilayer membrane is a name to describe the composition of the cell membrane. With the current knowledge and advancement of the instrument, it is possible to study the properties of lipid bilayers such as viscosity. The study applied the fluorescence spectroscopy technique to identify that even if there is only a single phospholipid bilayer constructs the liposome, we can still detect a different level of viscosity existing in the membrane.

=== Study of Protein Reactions ===
Several spectroscopic methods allow modern scientists to identify the kinetic components of protein reactions in biological systems. Moreover, it is possible to adjust and engineer biological reactions by applying laser radiation to them. For instance, we can induce the process of protein crystallization using the technique called "laser trapping".

=== Hydrogel Synthesis ===
Riboflavin, or commonly, vitamin B2, has the ability to become a reactive species that can undergo various reactions under the existence of light and oxygen. The significant reaction involved the synthesis of a hydrogel. Hydrogel is a porous material that can hold a large amount of water while maintaining its shape. The application of hydrogel includes drug delivery, artificial muscles, tissue engineering, etc.

=== Enzyme Improvement ===
Enzymes are substances that can accelerate chemical reactions. However, the usage of enzymes in real applications has a lot of limitations, including, but not limited to stability, compatibility, and cost. By using the concept of biophysical chemistry, it is possible to improve those limitations, as well as increase the performance of enzymes.

=== Anticancer Drugs ===
Deoxyribonucleic acid (DNA) is the molecule that is the basis of all living things. Moreover, it is a main target of anticancer drugs. Studying the interaction between drugs and DNA allows the researcher to develop drugs that could efficiently treat cancer.

== Institutes ==
The oldest reputed institute for biophysical chemistry is the Max Planck Institute for Biophysical Chemistry in Göttingen.

== Journals ==
Biophysical chemistry journals include Biophysical Journal, Archives of Biochemistry and Biophysics (published by Academic Press), Biochemical and Biophysical Research Communications (Academic Press), Biochimica et Biophysica Acta (Elsevier Science), Biophysical Chemistry, An International Journal devoted to the Physics and Chemistry of Biological Phenomena (Elsevier), Journal of Biochemical and Biophysical Methods (Elsevier), Journal of Biochemistry, Biology and Biophysics (Taylor & Francis), and Journal de Chimie Physique, Physico-Chimie Biologique (EDP Sciences and the Société Française de Chimie).

== See also ==
- Biophysical techniques
- Biophysics
- Biochemistry

== Bibliography ==
- Cantor, Charles R.; Schimmel, Paul R. (1980). Biophysical Chemistry - Part I: The Conformation of Biological Macromolecules (1st ed.). W.H. Freeman & Co Ltd. ISBN 0716711885.
- Cantor, Charles R.; Schimmel, Paul R. (1980). Biophysical Chemistry - Part II: Techniques for the Study of Biological Structure and Function (1st ed.). W.H. Freeman & Co Ltd. ISBN 0716711907.
- Cantor, Charles R.; Schimmel, Paul R. (1980). Biophysical Chemistry - Part III: The Behavior of Biological Macromolecules (1st ed.). W.H. Freeman & Co Ltd. ISBN 0716711923.
- Bruce, Martin, R. Introduction to Biophysical Chemistry. Journal of Medical Education: September 1964 - Volume 39 - Issue 9 - p 867.
- Cooper, Alan (2015-11-09). Biophysical Chemistry. Royal Society of Chemistry. ISBN 978-1-78262-510-0.
