= British Biophysical Society =

Scientific society

The British Biophysical Society is a scientific society that exists to encourage and disseminate developments in the application of physical and chemical concepts to biological systems. It was founded in 1960 following a report from a Working Party on Biophysics and Biophysical Chemistry initiated by the Council of the then Faraday Society of London. The current Chair is Olwyn Byron.

== History ==
The first full meeting of the Working Party on Biophysics and Biophysical Chemistry was held on 4 February 1960. The party included D D Eley, L H Gray, A F Huxley, J C Kendrew, C F A Pantin, R D Preston, J T Randall, F J W Roughton and P M B Walker.

The first meeting of the British Biophysical Society was held at King's College (London) and was organised by J T Randall. The birth of the BBS can be said to date from this inaugural meeting held on 19 and 20 December 1960. The meeting took the form of two symposia on Comparative Studies of Muscular Contraction and on the Structure of Ribonucleic Acid, together with sessions for contributed papers. Minutes of the Steering Committee held on 8 December record that there had already been 183 applications to join the Society and 177 to attend the meeting. By the end of 1960, the membership totaled 224. At the King's College meeting W T Astbury and A V Hill were elected Honorary members.

== The early years ==
The first Steering Committee of the BBS, J C Kendrew became the first Honorary Secretary and D D Eley Meetings Secretary, and the Committee elected J T Randall as its first Chairman and P B M Walker as Honorary Treasurer. Other committee members were S Brenner, J A V Butler, A F Huxley, R D Keynes, R D Preston, J W S Pringle, F J W Roughton and J T Weiss.

From its inception the British Biophysical Society embraced a wide range of topics in Biology. The first major scientific meeting of the British Biophysical Society at King’s College, London (on The Structure of Globular Proteins and The Function of Proteins) and a report on proceedings written by Freddie (Herbert) Gutfreund (one of the Society’s founder members), appeared in the journal Nature.

== BBS Today ==
The BBS has about 700 members in its newsgroup, and ~ 220 paying members. It is affiliated to EBSA and IUPAb. The BBS committee meets three times a year, organizing and sponsoring both specialist and a more general meeting biennially, in the years that EBSA does not have its congress.

BBS also supports travel bursaries for younger scientists, and is the adhering society to IUPAB (Tony North was general Secretary of IUPAB for ~ 12 years, and a founding member of BBS) and EBSA (since its inception through the initial activities of Peter Bayley, former editor of Eur. Biophys. J), and is working with the Biophysical Chemistry group of the Royal Chemical Society, and the Biological Physics group of the Institute of Physics. In 2007, BBS was the national society organizing the 6th EBSA/BBS congress at Imperial College, London, with Mike Ferenczi (London) as the local organizer and Tony Watts (Oxford) as scientific chair, attracting over 1350 participants and ~800 posters. In 2010, the 50th Anniversary Symposium of the British Biophysical Society was held at Robinson College, Cambridge, and further biennial meetings have been in Durham in 2012 and Warwick in 2014.

In 2017, BBS and the Biological Physics Group of the Institute of Physics, jointly organized the IUPAB/EBSA/BBS/IoP Biophysics Congress in Edinburgh, with Tony Watts as Chair and Andrew Turberfield as co-chair of the congress.

=== Honorary members ===
2020: Stephen Harding, Simon Philips Alison Rodger

2019: Cait MacPhee, Chris Tate, Malcolm Weir

2018: Tony Watts, Rob Cooke

2017: Richard Cogdell, Paul Engel, Andrew Millar

2016: Dennis Noble, Bonnie Wallace, John Helliwell

2015: Tom McLeish, Eleanor Dodson, Jane Clarke

2014: Alan Cooper, Robin Leatherbarrow, Sheena Radford, Helen Saibil

2013: Dame Athene M. Donald, Dame Carol V. Robinson

2012: Hagan Bayley, Mike Ferenczi

2011: Sir Gregory Winter and Judith Howard

2010: Fran Ashcroft, Chris Dobson, Janet Thornton, Venki Ramakrishnan

2009: Alan Fersht, Jean Thomas

2008: Iain Campbell*, John Squire

2007: Jim Barber, Tim Bliss, Guy Dodson, Gordon C. K. Roberts

2006: Peter Bayley, Tom Blundell

2005: Peter J. Knowles, Andrew Thomson

2004: Louise Johnson, David R. Trentham

2003: Sydney Brenner, Richard Henderson, Olga Kennard

2001: David Blow*, Ken Holmes

2000: Pauline Harrison, Robert Simmons

1999: Anthony C. T. North, John E. Walker

1992: Lord Adrian*, E. R. Andrew*, H. (Freddie) Gutfreund, Alan L. Hodgkin*, Andrew Huxley, Hugh E. Huxley, Aaron Klug, Roger Pain, David Phillips*, P. Walker, D. R. Wilkie*, Maurice Wilkins*, Robert J. P. Williams

1988: Richard Keynes*

1982: Dan Eley, John Kendrew*, Max Perutz*

1981: R. D. Preston*, J. Randall*

- deceased
