= Maurizio Brunori =

Italian biochemist (born 1937)

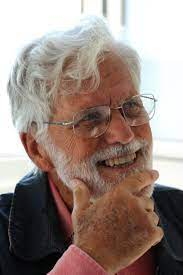
Image of Maurizio Brunori

Maurizio Brunori (8 May 1937) is an Italian biochemist who holds an Emeritus Professorship in Chemistry and Biochemistry at Università degli Studi di Roma La Sapienza. He is particularly noted for his work on the structure, function, evolution, and dynamics of both myoglobins and hemoglobins.

== Professional Standing ==
- Member of the Academia dei Lincei.
- President of the Istituto Pasteur-Rome (2003-2006).
- Member of the American Academy of Arts and Sciences
- Winner of the 18th Galileo Galilei International Prize

== Selected publications ==
- Brunori, M., Giuffrè, A., Nienhaus, K., Nienhaus, G. U., Scandurra, F. M., & Vallone, B. (2005). Neuroglobin, nitric oxide, and oxygen: functional pathways and conformational changes. Proceedings of the National Academy of Sciences, 102(24), 8483-8488.
- Brunori, M. (2001). Nitric oxide moves myoglobin centre stage. Trends in biochemical sciences, 26(4), 209-210.
