= Knighton on Teme =

Village in Worcestershire, England

Coordinates: 52°19′40″N 2°32′37″W

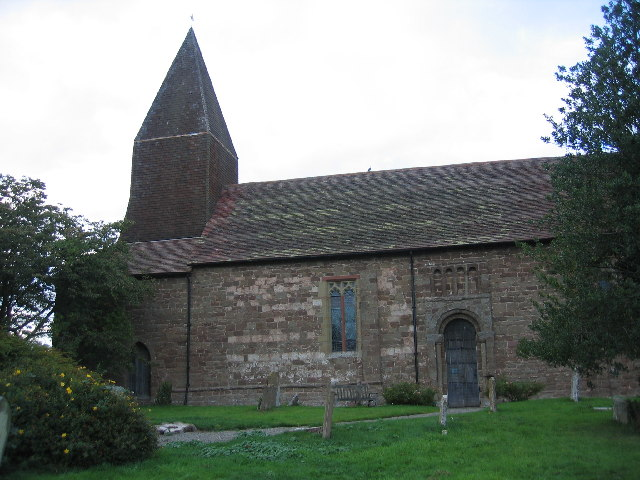
- St Michael's Church

- Location within Worcestershire
- Population: 500
- OS grid reference: SO631714
- Civil parish: Knighton on Teme
- District: Malvern Hills
- Shire county: Worcestershire
- Region: West Midlands
- Country: England
- Sovereign state: United Kingdom
- Post town: TENBURY WELLS
- Postcode district: WR15
- Police: West Mercia
- Fire: Hereford and Worcester
- Ambulance: West Midlands
- UK Parliament: West Worcestershire

Knighton on Teme is a village and civil parish once in the hundred of Doddingtree and now in the Malvern Hills District of the county of Worcestershire, England. Its name is first attested in an eleventh-century manuscript of a charter from c. 957 as Cnihtatun, meaning 'farm of the young men', and also mentions the River Teme.

The parish consists of the village of Newnham Bridge and several small hamlets including Aston Court, Bickley, Cainey, Clethill, Cornwood, Deptcroft, Field Farm, Knighton, Maythorn, Newnham, Oxnall Farm, Stony Cross, Little London and Woodgates Green. It has a population of around 500 people and about 200 houses. A Norman Romanesque church in the parish, St Michael and All Angels, is a Grade I listed building.

== History ==
Domesday Book states the parish as having a priest in 1086.
