= Helen Saibil =

British molecular biologist

Helen Saibil FRS FMedSci
- Born: August 12, 1950 (age 76) born in Québec, Canada
- Occupation: Scientist
- Known for: determining the structure of a protein assembly used by the immune system to kill unwanted cells

Academic background
- Education: McGill University
- Alma mater: King's College London
- Thesis: Diffraction studies of retinal rod outer segment membranes (1977)

Academic work
- Discipline: Molecular biology
- Sub-discipline: Structural biology
- Institutions: Birkbeck, University of London
- Main interests: Molecular chaperones Protein misfolding
- Website: www.bbk.ac.uk/biology/our-staff/academic/helen-saibil

External videos
- Helen Saibil: Visualization of Electron Microscopy Structures & Multi-scale Assemblies

Helen Ruth Saibil (born August 12, 1950) is a Canadian-British molecular biologist and Professor of Structural Biology at the Department of Crystallography of Birkbeck, University of London. Her research is largely focuses on molecular chaperones and protein misfolding.

Saibil completed undergraduate studies at McGill University in 1971 followed by a PhD at King's College London, receiving her thesis in 1977 entitled Diffraction studies of retinal rod outer segment membranes. Saibil went on to work at CEA Grenoble and the University of Oxford. Saibil has been at Birkbeck since 1989, and was elected to the Royal Society in 2006 and the Academy of Medical Sciences in 2009. Her research interests are on the operation of macromolecular machines using three-dimensional electron microscopy in the areas of molecular chaperones and assisted protein folding/unfolding, misfolding into amyloid, and protein refolding in membrane pore formation.

Saibil was elected a Fellow of the Royal Society in 2006 and a Fellow of the Academy of Medical Sciences in 2009.
