= Neurophysics =

Study of the nervous system with physics

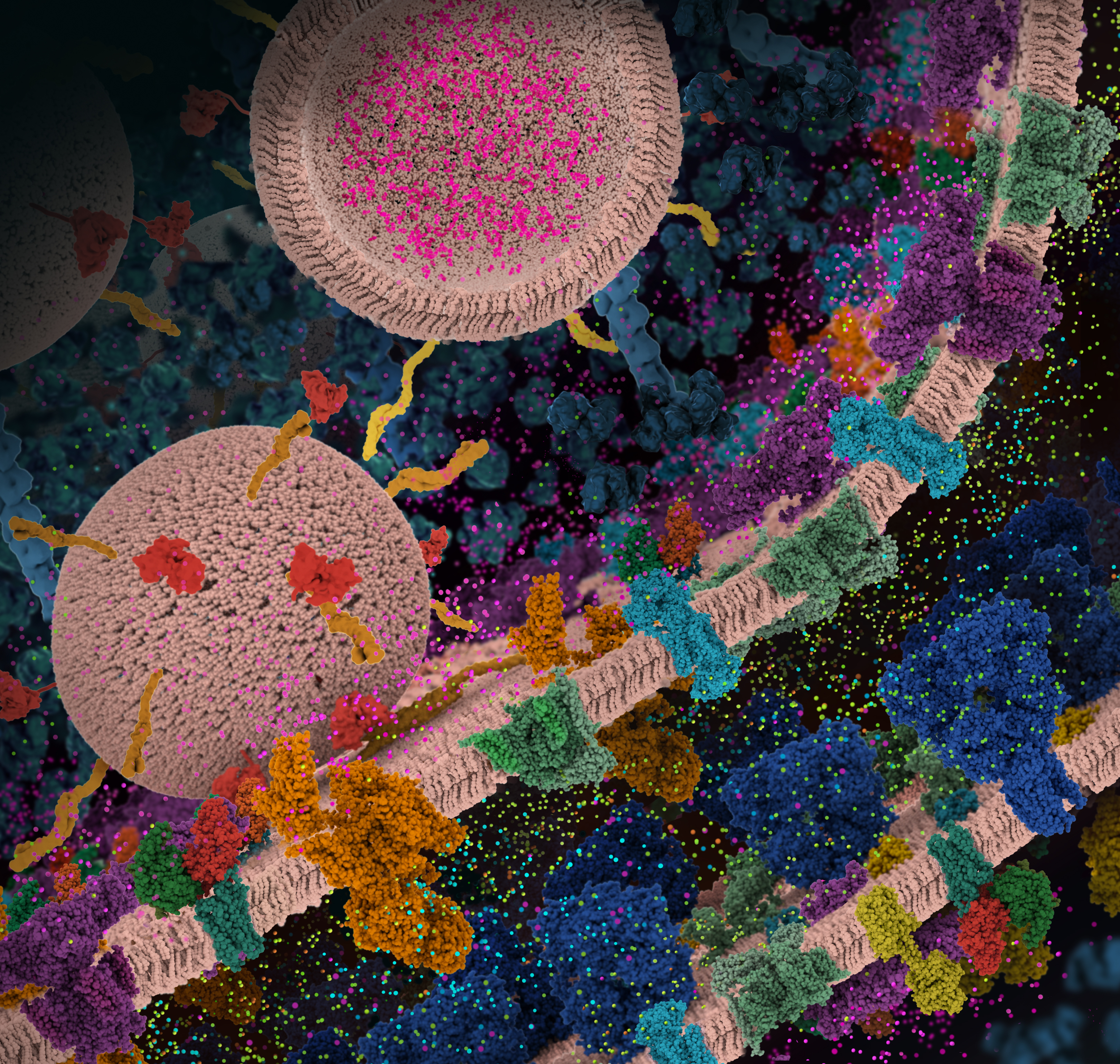
Molecular illustration of a glutamatergic synapse, showing presynaptic vesicles containing glutamate (pink) and key membrane proteins involved in neuronal signalling. The structures are based on experimentally determined data from the Protein Data Bank, including voltage-gated ion channels, receptors, and transporters. Potassium (magenta), sodium (lime green), and calcium (cyan) ions highlight the electrochemical gradients central to neurophysics.

Neurophysics (or neurobiophysics) is the branch of biophysics dealing with the development and use of physical methods to gain information about the nervous system. Neurophysics is an interdisciplinary science using physics and combining it with other neurosciences to better understand neural processes. The term "neurophysics" is a portmanteau of "neuron" and "physics". Nanoneurobiophysics is the specialization of neurobiophysics in the nanoscale as well as a sub-field of nanoscience. Nanoneurobiophysics is focused around the study of demyelinization and neurodegenerative diseases with the final aim to apply the knowledge to the field of nanomedicine (i.e., diagnosing and treating diseases through nanotechnology).

The methods used include the techniques of experimental biophysics and other physical measurements such as EEG mostly to study electrical, mechanical or fluidic properties, as well as theoretical and computational approaches. Among other examples, the theorisation of ectopic action potentials in neurons using a Kramers-Moyal expansion and the description of physical phenomena measured during an EEG using a dipole approximation use neurophysics to better understand neural activity.

Another quite distinct theoretical approach considers neurons as having Ising model energies of interaction and explores the physical consequences of this for various Cayley tree topologies and large neural networks. In 1981, the exact solution for the closed Cayley tree (with loops) was derived by Peter Barth for an arbitrary branching ratio and found to exhibit an unusual phase transition behavior in its local-apex and long-range site-site correlations, suggesting that the emergence of structurally-determined and connectivity-influenced cooperative phenomena may play a significant role in large neural networks.

== Recording techniques ==
Old techniques to record brain activity using physical phenomena are already widespread in research and medicine. Electroencephalography (EEG) uses electrophysiology to measure electrical activity within the brain. This technique, with which Hans Berger first recorded brain electrical activity on a human in 1924, is non-invasive and uses electrodes placed on the scalp of the patient to record brain activity. Based on the same principle, electrocorticography (ECoG) requires a craniotomy to record electrical activity directly on the cerebral cortex.

In the recent decades, physicists have come up with technologies and devices to image the brain and its activity. The Functional Magnetic Resonance Imaging (fMRI) technique, discovered by Seiji Ogawa in 1990, reveals blood flow changes inside the brain. Based on the existing medical imaging technique Magnetic Resonance Imaging (MRI) and on the link between the neural activity and the cerebral blood flow, this tool enables scientists to study brain activities when they are triggered by a controlled stimulation. Another technique, the Two Photons Microscopy (2P), invented by Winfried Denk (for which he has been awarded the Brain Prize in 2015), John H. Strickler and Watt W. Webb in 1990 at Cornell University, uses fluorescent proteins and dyes to image brain cells. This technique combines the two-photon absorption, first theorized by Maria Goeppert-Mayer in 1931, with lasers. Today, this technique is widely used in research and often coupled with genetic engineering to study the behavior of a specific type of neuron.

== Theories of consciousness ==
Consciousness is still an unknown mechanism and theorists have yet to come up with physical hypotheses explaining its mechanisms. Some theories rely on the idea that consciousness could be explained by the disturbances in the cerebral electromagnetic field generated by the action potentials triggered during brain activity. These theories are called electromagnetic theories of consciousness. Another group of hypotheses suggest that consciousness cannot be explained by classical dynamics but with quantum mechanics and its phenomena. These hypotheses are grouped into the idea of quantum mind and were first introduced by Eugene Wigner.

== Neurophysics institutes ==
- The Theoretical Neurophysics Laboratory, University of Bremen
- Department of Neurophysics, Max-Planck Institute
- Center of Functionally Integrative Neuroscience, Neurophysics group, Aarhus University
- W. M. Keck Center for Neurophysics, UCLA
- Neurophysics Program, Georgia State University
- Neurophysics at the Institute of Neurology, University College of London
- Neurophysics at Radboud University, Radboud University Nijmegen

== Awards ==
Among the list of prizes that reward neurophysicists for their contribution to neurology and related fields, the most notable one is the Brain Prize, whose last laureates are Adrian Bird and Huda Zoghbi for "their groundbreaking work to map and understand epigenetic regulation of the brain and for identifying the gene that causes Rett syndrome". The other most relevant prizes that can be awarded to a neurophysicist are: the NAS Award in the Neurosciences, the Kavli Prize and to some extent the Nobel Prize in Physiology or Medicine. It can be noted that a Nobel Prize was awarded to scientists that developed techniques which contributed widely to a better understanding of the nervous system, such as Neher and Sakmann in 1991 for the patch clamp, and also to Lauterbur and Mansfield for their work on Magnetic resonance imaging (MRI) in 2003.

== See also ==
- Action potential – Neuron communication by electric impulses
- Brain – Organ central to the nervous system
- Biophysics – Interdisciplinary science
- Electrical engineering – Branch of engineering
- Electrophysiology – Electrical properties of biological cells
- Molecular neuroscience – Branch of neuroscience
- Neural engineering – Discipline in biomedical engineering
- Neuroimaging – Set of techniques to measure and visualize aspects of the nervous system
- Neurophysiology – Study of neural function
- Neuroscience – Scientific study of the nervous system
- Psychophysics – Branch of knowledge relating physical stimuli and psychological perception
- Quantum mind – Fringe hypothesis
- Soliton model in neuroscience

== Books ==
- Wulfram Gerstner and Werner M. Kistler, Spiking Neuron Models, Single Neurons, Populations, Plasticity, Cambridge University Press (2002) ISBN 0-521-89079-9 ISBN 0-521-81384-0
- Alwyn Scott, Neuroscience: A Mathematical Primer, Birkhäuser (2002) ISBN 0-387-95403-1
- Graben, Peter; Zhou, Changsong; Thiel, Marco; Kurths, Jürgen (2008), "Foundations of Neurophysics", Lectures in Supercomputational Neurosciences, Berlin, Heidelberg: Springer, pp. 3–48, Bibcode:2008lsn..book.....G, doi:10.1007/978-3-540-73159-7, ISBN 978-3-540-73159-7
