= Bibliography of biology =

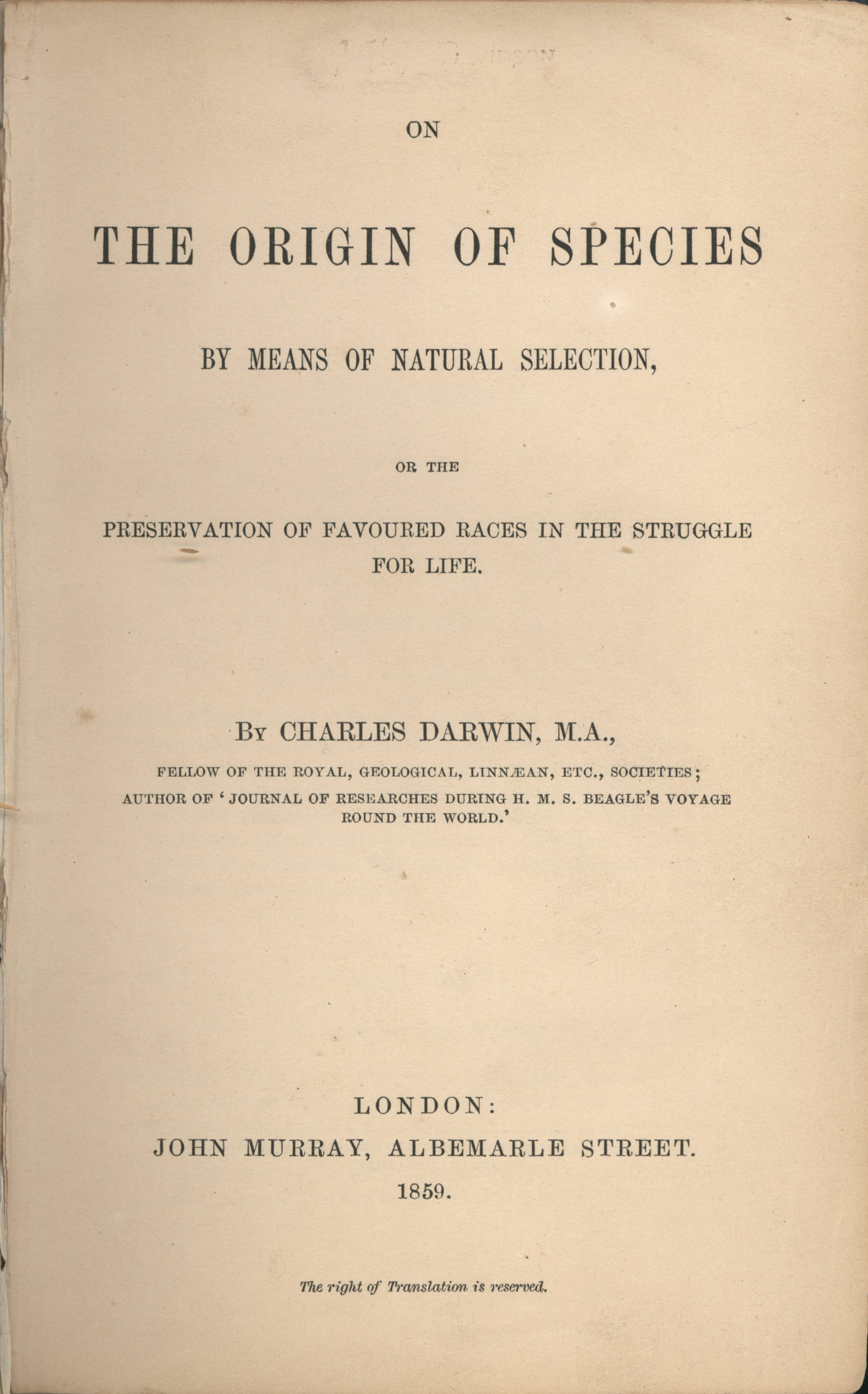
Title page of the 1859 Murray edition of the Origin of Species by Charles Darwin.

This bibliography of biology is a list of notable works, organized by subdiscipline, on the subject of biology.

Biology is a natural science concerned with the study of life and living organisms, including their structure, function, growth, origin, evolution, distribution, and taxonomy. Biology is a vast subject containing many subdivisions, topics, and disciplines. Subdisciplines of biology are recognized on the basis of the scale at which organisms are studied and the methods used to study them.

== Anatomy ==
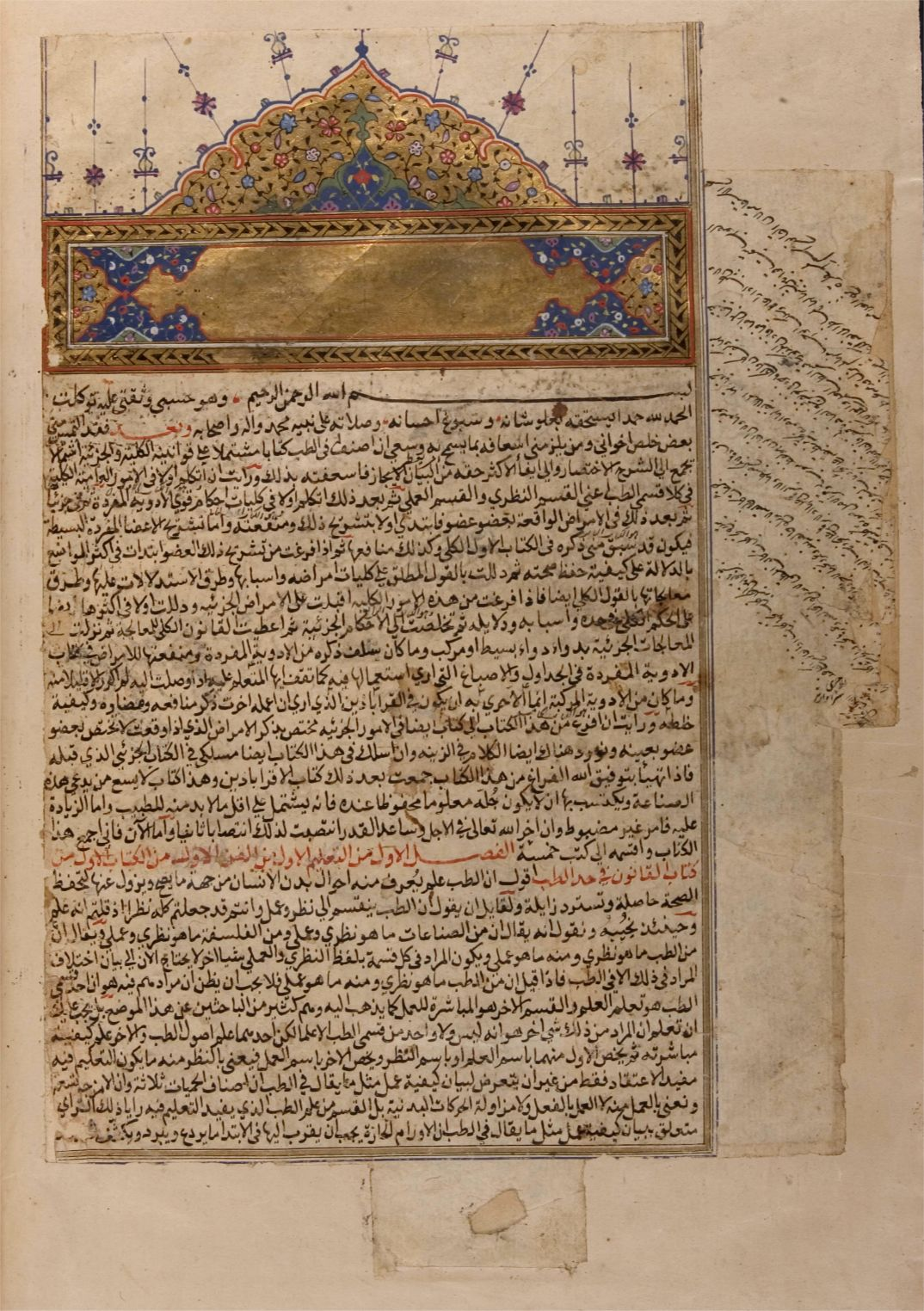
Avicenna's Canon: opening decoration and invocation to Allah from a 16th-century manuscript.

This section contains a list of works in anatomy, the study of the structure of living things.

- Ibn Sīnā (Avicenna) (1025). The Canon of Medicine.
- Vesalius, Andreas (1543). De humani corporis fabrica libri septem (On the fabric of the human body in seven books).

A landmark publication in anatomy and medicine.

It is the 400th birthyear of the beautiful book which graces the lectern in front of me, the most artistic book and one of the most illuminating in the history of medicine. As Osier remarked, 1543 is a starred year in the history of science. In it appeared the two great works which inaugurated modern science, Copernicus' Revolutions of the heavenly bodies, which gave us a rational and abiding explanation of the workings of the macrocosm, the great universe, and Vesalius' Fabrica, which for the first time fully, and for the first time accurately, portrayed not only the structure but to some extent also the workings of the body of man, that mysterious spiritual animal which the Middle Ages called the microcosm or little universe.

— Dr. William Willoughby Francis, 1943,

- Gray, Henry (1858). Henry Gray's Anatomy of the Human Body.

First published under the title Gray's Anatomy: Descriptive and Surgical in Great Britain in 1858, and the following year in the United States. Gray died after the publication of the 1860 second edition, at the age of 34, but his book was continued by others. In 2008, for the 150th anniversary of the first edition, the 40th edition was released.

== Biophysics ==
This section is a list of works on biophysics, an interdisciplinary science that uses the methods of physical science to study biological systems.

- Galvani, Luigi (1791). De viribus electricitatis in motu musculari commentarius. Bologna: Accademia delle Scienze. English translation: — (1955). "Commentary on the Effects of Electricity on Muscular Motion". Isis. 46 (3). Translated by Margaret Glover Foley: 305–309. doi:10.1086/348425.

Galvani's researches into stimulating muscles with electricity. His theory of an "animal electric fluid" was later disproved by Alessandro Volta, but stimulated research into bioelectricity.

== Botany ==
This section is a list of works on botany, the scientific study of plant life.

- Elpel, Thomas (2004). Botany in a Day: The Patterns Method of Plant Identification. Pony, Montana: HOPS Press, LLC. ISBN 978-1-892784-15-5.: Emphasizes plant family characteristics to facilitate plant identification. Used as a text at many universities and herbal schools.

== Cell biology ==
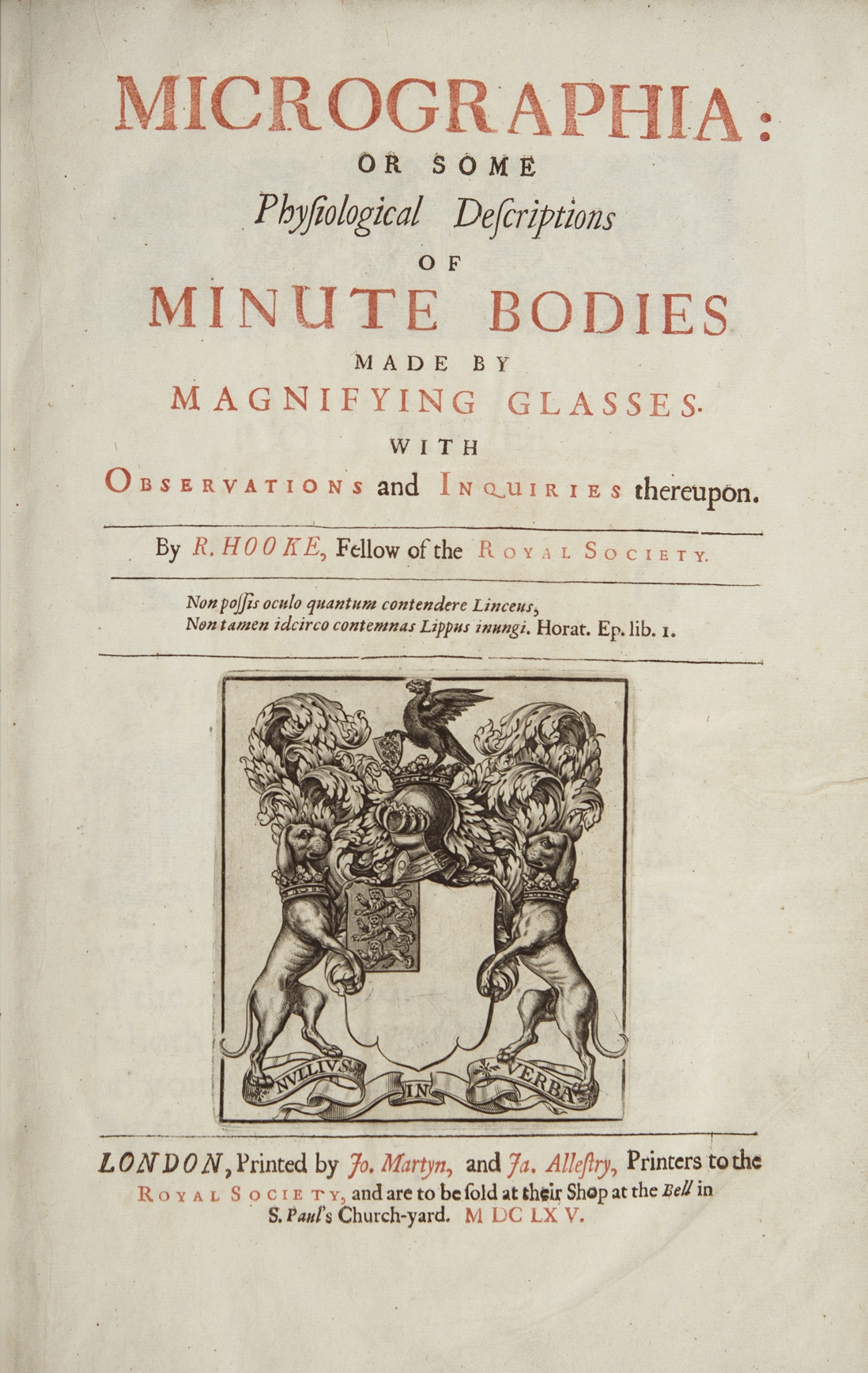
Title page of Micrographia.

This section contains a list of works on cell biology, the study of cells – their physiological properties, their structure, the organelles they contain, interactions with their environment, their life cycle, division and death.

- Hooke, Robert (1665). Micrographia: or, Some physiological descriptions of minute bodies made by magnifying glasses (first ed.). J. Martyn and J. Allestry.

== Ecology ==
This section contains a list of works in ecology, the scientific study of the relations that living organisms have with respect to each other and their natural environment.

- Warming, Eugenius. Plantesamfund – Grundtræk af den økologiske Plantegeografi (in Danish). 335 pp. Copenhagen: P.G. Philipsens Forlag. Published in English as — (1909). Oecology of Plants: An Introduction to the Study of Plant Communities. (English edition). Oxford: Clarendon Press.

Turned descriptive faunistic/floristic biogeography into a new discipline, ecology. Based on his botanical investigations from Tropics to tundra, Warmings aimed to explain how similar environmental challenges (drought, flooding, cold, salt, herbivory etc.) were solved by plants in similar ways everywhere in the World, despite the different descent of species on different continents.

- Gause, Georgii Frantsevich (1936). The struggle for existence. Baltimore: Williams and Wilkins.

Gause formulated his Competitive exclusion principle, through experiments involving paramecia. The principle holds that no two species can co-exist for long if they have to compete for highly similar resources. This outcome has two preconditions: 1) panmixis of individuals of competing species, 2) the environment is homogeneous in time and space. These conditions may be met by aquatic microorganisms grown under laboratory conditions. However, in most real-world biotic communities, both conditions are likely to be violated from moderately to strongly. Due to its simplicity and intuitiveness, Gause's Competitive exclusion principle has had a great impact on subsequent ecological thinking.

== Evolutionary biology ==
This section contains a list of works on evolution, the change across successive generations in the heritable characteristics of biological populations.

- Georges-Louis Leclerc, Comte de Buffon (1749–1788). Histoire Naturelle.

Until the publication of this encyclopedia much of the European scientific community thought that all animals were created by God about 6,000 years ago. Not only did this 44-volume encyclopedia contain all descriptive biological knowledge of its time, it offered a new theory. One hundred years before Darwin, Buffon claimed that man and ape might have a common ancestor. His work also had a significant impact on ecology.

It is no exaggeration to claim that virtually all the well-known writers of the Enlightenment, and even of later generations, in France as well as in other European countries were Buffonians, either directly or indirectly.

— Mayr, 2000

- Lamarck, Jean-Baptiste (1809). Philosophie zoologique ou exposition des considérations relatives à l'histoire naturelle des animaux. Dentu and The Author. English translation: Lamarck, Jean Baptiste Pierre Antoine de Monet (2001). Zoological philosophy: an exposition with regard to the natural history of animals. Nabu Press. ISBN 978-1-178-26555-2.
- Darwin, Charles; Wallace, Alfred Russel (1858). "On the Tendency of Species to form Varieties; and on the Perpetuation of Varieties and Species by Natural Means of Selection". Zoological Journal of the Linnean Society. 3 (9): 46–50. doi:10.1111/j.1096-3642.1858.tb02500.x.

In September 1838 Charles Darwin conceived his theory of natural selection as the cause of evolution, then as well as developing his career as a naturalist worked privately on finding evidence and answering possible objections, circulating essays written in 1842 and 1844 to his friends. Wallace, who was corresponding with Darwin from Borneo, arrived independently at the same theory. He wrote his paper On The Tendency of Varieties to Depart Indefinitely from the Original Type in February 1858 and sent it to Darwin, who received it on 18 June 1858 and passed it to Lyell and Hooker. They arranged for a joint publication of Wallace's paper and an extract from Darwin's 1844 essay; this was read to the Linnean Society of London on 1 July 1858, and printed in the Zoological Journal of the Linnean Society 3: 46-50. It had little impact at the time, but spurred Darwin to write an "abstract" of the "big book" Natural Selection he was then working on; this condensed version was published in November 1859 as On the Origin of Species.

- Darwin, Charles (1859). On the Origin of Species. London: John Murray.(Online: 6th Edition (text))

The Origin of Species is one of the hallmark works of biology. In this shortened abstract of his intended "big book" on Natural Selection, Darwin details his theory that organisms gradually evolve through a process of natural selection, and this process leads to the formation of new species. It was first published on November 24, 1859 and the initial print run was oversubscribed by booksellers at Murray's Autumn sale the day before.
Darwin presents a theory of natural selection that is in most aspects identical to the theories now accepted by scientists. He carefully argues out this theory by presenting accumulated scientific evidence from his voyage on the Beagle in the 1830s, and from his continuing studies up to the date of publication. His studies continued with the book being revised accordingly; the most extensive revisions were the 6th and final edition.
Darwin's theory of evolution by natural selection, with its tree-like model of branching common descent, has become the unifying theory of the life sciences. The theory explains the diversity of living organisms and their adaptation to the environment. It makes sense of the geologic record, biogeography, parallels in embryonic development, biological homologies, vestigiality, cladistics, phylogenetics and other fields, with unrivalled explanatory power; it has also become essential to applied sciences such as medicine and agriculture.

- Darwin, Charles (1871). The Descent of Man, and Selection in Relation to Sex. John Murray.
- Fisher, Ronald (1930). The Genetical Theory of Natural Selection. Oxford University Press.

In the preface, Fisher considers some general points, including that there must be an understanding of natural selection distinct from that of evolution, and that the then-recent advances in the field of genetics (see history of genetics) now allowed this. In the first chapter, Fisher considers the nature of inheritance, rejecting blending inheritance in favour of particulate inheritance. The second chapter introduces Fisher's fundamental theorem of natural selection. The third considers the evolution of dominance, which Fisher believed was strongly influenced by modifiers. The last five chapters (8-12) include Fisher's more idiosyncratic views on eugenics. One of the founding works of population genetics.

- Dobzhansky, Theodosius (1937). Genetics and the origin of species. With an introduction by Stephen Jay Gould (1982 Reprint ed.). New York: Columbia University Press. ISBN 978-0-231-05475-1.
- Wilson, E. O. (1975). Sociobiology: The New Synthesis. Cambridge, MA: Belknap Press.

Wilson introduced the term sociobiology as an attempt to explain the evolutionary mechanics behind social behaviors such as altruism, aggression, and nurturance. Wilson's book sparked one of the great scientific controversies in biology of the 20th century.

- Gould, Stephen Jay (1977). Ontogeny and Phylogeny. Harvard University Press. ISBN 978-0-674-63940-9.

Critically revisits Haeckel's idea that ontogeny recapitulates phylogeny. Gould presents heterochrony as a concept that allows us to describe the majority of developmental processes in evolution. This book played a significant role at the time by bringing the evolutionary biology community back to examine developmental biology, ignored for many years.

- Pinker, Steven (1999). How the mind works. Vol. 882. New York: Norton. pp. 119–27, discussion 128–34. doi:10.1111/j.1749-6632.1999.tb08538.x. ISBN 978-0-393-31848-7. PMID 10415890. S2CID 38521835.

A synthesis of many of the ideas of Evolutionary Psychology. This field posits that there are insights into the way that the mind works if you view our cognitive capabilities as the adaptive result of evolution. Synthesizes the work of many Evolutionary Psychologists and provides a comprehensive starting point for inquiries into (exactly as the title states) how the mind works.

== Genetics ==
This section contains a list of works on genetics, the science of genes, heredity, and variation in living organisms.

- Mendel, Gregor (1866). "Versuche über Pflanzen-Hybriden". Verhandlungen des naturforschenden Vereins Brünn. Published in English as "Experiments on Plant Hybridization". Journal of the Royal Horticultural Society. 26: 1–30. 1901. (Online version)

The result of years spent studying genetic traits in pea plants. Mendel compared seven discrete traits. Through experimentation, Mendel discovered that one inheritable trait would invariably be dominant to its recessive alternative. This model, later known as Mendelian inheritance or Mendelian genetics, provided an alternative to blending inheritance, which was the prevailing theory at the time.

- Fisher, Ronald (1918). "The Correlation Between Relatives on the Supposition of Mendelian Inheritance". Transactions of the Royal Society of Edinburgh. 52 (2): 399–433. doi:10.1017/s0080456800012163. S2CID 181213898.
- Schrödinger, Erwin (1944). What is life? the physical aspects of the living cell (2001 reprint ed.). Cambridge: Cambridge Univ. Press. ISBN 978-0-521-42708-1.

Based on a series of public lectures delivered at Trinity College, Dublin. Schrödinger's lecture focused on one important question: "how can the events in space and time which take place within the spatial boundary of a living organism be accounted for by physics and chemistry?" He introduced the idea of an "aperiodic crystal" that contained genetic information in its configuration of covalent chemical bonds. In the 1950s, Schrödinger's idea of an aperiodic crystal stimulated enthusiasm for discovering the genetic molecule. Francis Crick, co-discoverer of the structure of DNA, credited Schrödinger's book with presenting an early theoretical description of how the storage of genetic information would work, and acknowledged the book as a source of inspiration for his initial research.

- Pauling, Linus; Harvey A. Itano; S. J. Singer; Ibert C. Wells (1949). "Sickle Cell Anemia, a Molecular Disease". Science. 110 (2865): 543–548. Bibcode:1949Sci...110..543P. doi:10.1126/science.110.2865.543. PMID 15395398. S2CID 31674765.
- Crick, Francis; Watson, James D. (1953). "Molecular Structure of Nucleic Acids: A Structure for Deoxyribose Nucleic Acid". Nature. 171 (4356): 737–738. Bibcode:1953Natur.171..737W. doi:10.1038/171737a0. PMID 13054692. S2CID 4253007. (Online version (Original text))

== Microbiology ==
This section contains a list of publications on microbiology. Microbiology is the study of microorganisms, which are defined as any microscopic organism that comprises either a single cell (unicellular), cell clusters or no cell at all (acellular).

== Molecular biology ==
This section contains a list of works on molecular biology, the study of the molecular basis of biological activity.

- Crick, Francis; Watson, James D. (1953). "Molecular Structure of Nucleic Acids: A Structure for Deoxyribose Nucleic Acid". Nature. 171 (4356): 737–738. Bibcode:1953Natur.171..737W. doi:10.1038/171737a0. PMID 13054692. S2CID 4253007. (Online version (Original text))

Described a molecular structure for DNA that was consistent with X-ray diffraction data and had implications for the nature of inheritance.

== Physiology ==
This section contains a list of works on physiology, the science of the function of living systems. This includes how organisms, organ systems, organs, cells and bio-molecules carry out the chemical or physical functions that exist in a living system.

- Harvey, William (1628). Exercitatio Anatomica de Motu Cordis et Sanguinis in Animalibus. English translation: Harvey, William (1993). On the motion of the heart and blood in animals. Translated by Robert Willis. Buffalo, N.Y.: Prometheus Books. ISBN 978-0-87975-854-7.

== Taxonomy ==
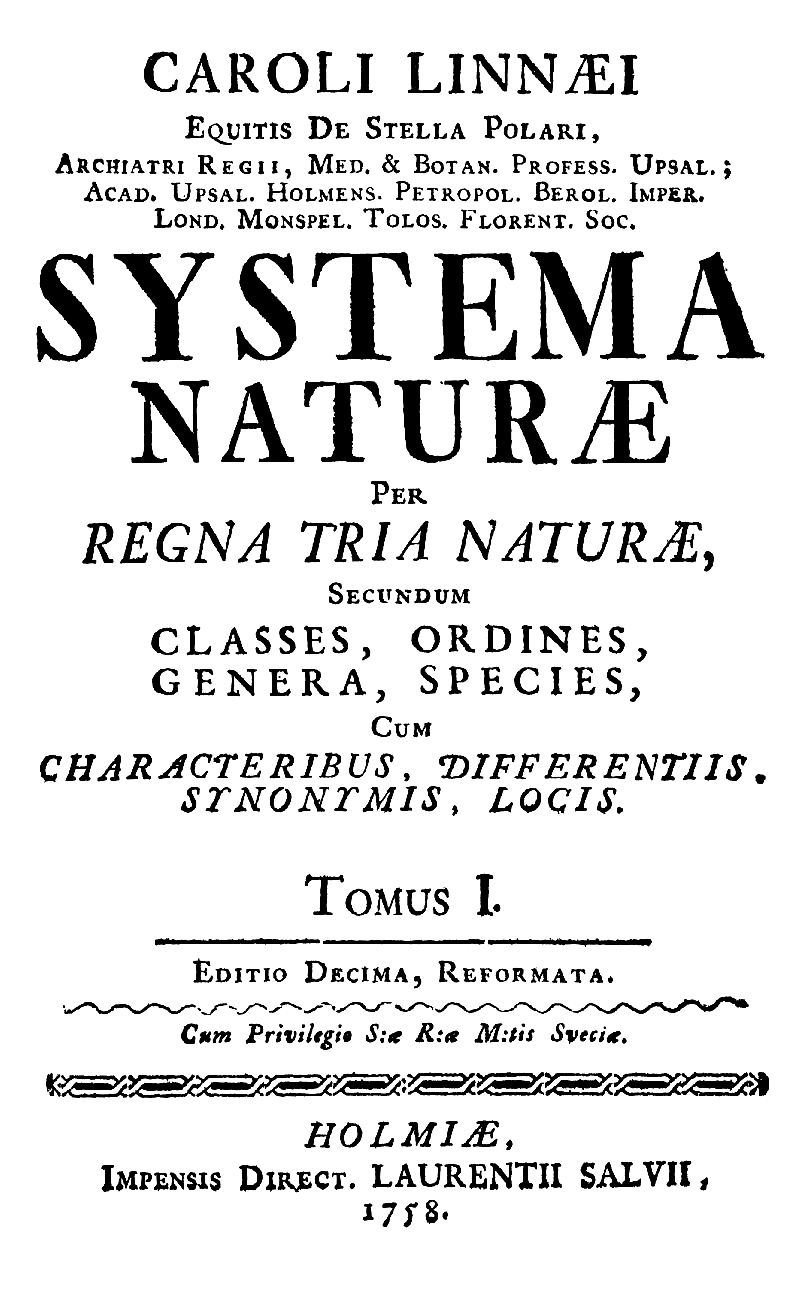
Title page of the 10th edition of Systema naturæ by Carl Linnæu.

This section contains a list of works on taxonomy, the practice and science of classification or the result of it.

- Linnaeus, Carolus (1758–1759). Systema naturæ per regna tria naturæ, secundum classes, ordines, genera, species, cum characteribus, differentiis, synonymis, locis (two volumes) (in Latin) (10th ed.). Stockholm: Laurentius Salvius. Online access
  Classified animals using a hierarchical system with 5 levels: Kingdom, class, order, genus and species. The official starting point of zoological nomenclature.
- Linnaeus, Carolus (1753). Species Plantarum (The Species of Plants).
  A two-volume work, going through many editions (ever expanding), listing all plants then known, made accessible by an ordering in (artificial) classes and orders, and giving every listed species a two-part name. With this book anybody, by counting the male and female parts present in a flower, could get to a listing of the genera the plant in question belongs to. The system of binomial nomenclature that bears his name effectively began with this work.

== Zoology ==
This section contains a list of works on zoology, the study of the animal kingdom, including the structure, embryology, evolution, classification, habits, and distribution of all animals, both living and extinct.

- Pliny. Naturalis Historia. (c. 77 – 79)

Encyclopedia of nature. It included many areas that are not considered to be part of nature sciences today - from geography, botany, zoology to painting. The encyclopedia was also novel with respect to its structure. It was the first to use references, table of contents and tables of animal characteristics.

- White, Gilbert (1813). The Natural History and Antiquities of Selborne.

Observations on birds and many other aspects of the natural world that White observed near where he lived.

== See also ==
- List of zoology journals
- Outline of biology
