= Virophysics =

Biophysics of the interactions between virus and cells

Virophysics is a branch of biophysics in which the theoretical concepts and experimental techniques of physics are applied to study the mechanics and dynamics driving the interactions between virions and cells.

== Research ==
Research in virophysics typically focuses on resolving the physical structure and structural properties of viruses, the dynamics of their assembly and disassembly, their population kinetics over the course of an infection, and the emergence and evolution of various strains.

The common aim of these efforts is to establish a set of models (expressions or laws) that quantitatively describe the details of all processes involved in viral infections with reliable predictive power. Having such a quantitative understanding of viruses would not only rationalize the development of strategies to prevent, guide, or control the course of viral infections, but could also be used to exploit virus processes and put virus to work in areas such as nanosciences, materials, and biotechnologies.

Traditionally, in vivo and in vitro experimentation has been the only way to study viral infections. This approach for deriving knowledge based solely on experimental observations relies on common-sense assumptions (e.g., a higher virus count means a fitter virus). These assumptions often go untested due to difficulties controlling individual components of these complex systems without affecting others. The use of mathematical models and computer simulations to describe such systems, however, makes it possible to deconstruct an experimental system into individual components and determine how the pieces combine to create the infection we observe.

== Overlap with other fields ==
Virophysics has large overlaps with other fields. For example, the modelling of infectious disease dynamics is a popular research topic in mathematics, notably in applied mathematics or mathematical biology. While most modelling efforts in mathematics have focused on elucidating the dynamics of spread of infectious diseases at an epidemiological scale (person-to-person), there is also important work being done at the cellular scale (cell-to-cell). Virophysics focuses almost exclusively on the single-cell or multi-cellular scale, utilizing physical models to resolve the temporal and spatial dynamics of viral infection spread within a cell culture (in vitro), an organ (ex vivo or in vivo) or an entire host (in vivo).
