= Biochemical and Biophysical Research Communications =

Scientific journal

- Discipline: Biochemistry, biophysics
- Language: English
- Edited by: Wolfgang Baumeister

Publication details
- History: 1959–present
- Publisher: Elsevier
- Frequency: Weekly
- Impact factor: 3.575 (2020)

Standard abbreviations
- ISO 4: Biochem. Biophys. Res. Commun.

Indexing
- CODEN: BBRCA9
- ISSN: 0006-291X (print); 1090-2104 (web)
- LCCN: 61065129
- OCLC no.: 1532958

Links
- Journal homepage; Online access

Biochemical and Biophysical Research Communications is a weekly peer-reviewed scientific journal covering all aspects of biochemistry and biophysics. It was established in 1959 by Academic Press and is published by Elsevier. The editor-in-chief is Wolfgang Baumeister (Max Planck Institute of Biochemistry).

According to the Journal Citation Reports, the journal has a 2020 impact factor of 3.575.

== Abstracting and indexing ==
The journal is abstracted and indexed in:

- Biological Abstracts
- Chemical Abstracts Service
- Current Contents/Life Sciences
- EMBASE/Excerpta Medica
- EMBiology
- MEDLINE/Index Medicus
- Science Citation Index
- Scopus
