= Biophysical Society =

US-based scientific society

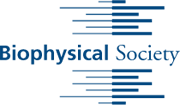
- Formation: 1958
- Type: Nonprofit
- Headquarters: Rockville, Maryland
- Location: United States
- Members: 7000
- Official language: English
- President: Karen Fleming
- Key people: Jennifer Pesanelli (Executive Officer)
- Staff: 17
- Website: http://www.biophysics.org/

The Biophysical Society is an international scientific society whose purpose is to lead the development and dissemination of knowledge in biophysics. Founded in 1958, the Society currently consists of over 7,000 members in academia, government, and industry. Although the Society is based in the United States, it is an international organization. Overseas members currently comprise over one third of the total.

== Origins ==
The Biophysical Society was founded in response to the growth of the field of biophysics after World War Two, as well as concerns that the American Physiological Society had become too large to serve the community of biophysicists. Discussions between prominent biophysicists in 1955 and 1956 led to the planning of the society's first meeting in Columbus, Ohio in 1957, with about 500 attendees. Among the scientists involved in the early effort were Ernest C. Pollard, Samuel Talbot, Otto Schmitt, Kenneth Stewart Cole, W. A. Selle, Max Lauffer, Ralph Stacy, Herman P. Schwan, and Robley C. Williams. This meeting was described by Cole as "a biophysics meeting with the ulterior motive of finding out if there was such a thing as biophysics and, if so, what sort of thing this biophysics might be."

== Organization ==
The Biophysical Society is governed by four officers: the President, President-elect, Past-President Secretary, and Treasurer, as well as by a Council of twelve members in addition to the officers. These offices are elected by the membership of the society. The Council appoints an executive officer to oversee the functions and staff of the society. The society has a number of committees that help to implement its mission. The committees are: Awards, Early Careers, Education, Finance, Member Services, Membership, Committee for Inclusion and Diversity, Nominating, Professional Opportunities for Women, Program, Public Affairs, Publications, and Thematic Meetings.

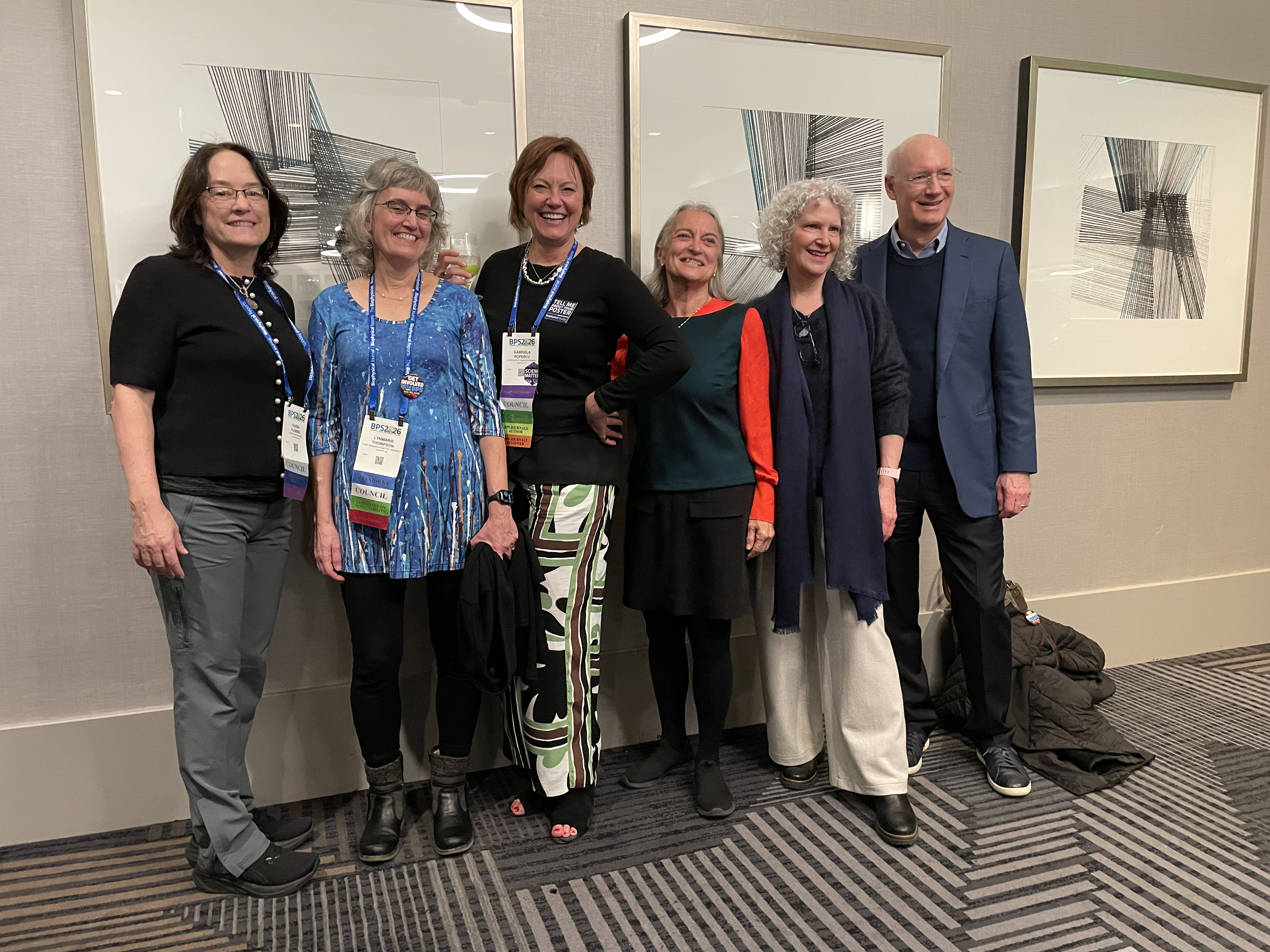
Six current and former presidents of the Biophysical Society at the 2026 Biophysical Society Meeting. From left to right: Karen Fleming, Lynmarie K. Thompson, Gabriela K. Popescu, Frances Separovic, Gail A. Robertson, and David W. Piston.

The Biophysical Society also supports subgroups focusing on smaller areas within biophysics. The current subgroups are: Bioenergetics, Mitochondria, and Metabolism, Bioengineering, Biological Fluorescence, Biopolymers in vivo, Cell Biophysics, Cryo-EM, Exocytosis and Endocytosis, Intrinsically Disordered Proteins, Membrane Biophysics, Membrane Structure & Function, Mechanobiology, Molecular Biophysics, Motility & Cytoskeleton, Nanoscale Biophysics, and Permeation & Transport.

== Activities ==
Since 1960 the Biophysical Society has published the Biophysical Journal, which is currently semi-monthly, as a specialized journal in the field of biophysics. This was started because the Society perceived other scientific journals as unsympathetic to submissions by biophysicists. The society also publishes a monthly newsletter, an annual Membership Directory, and a Products Guide.

The Biophysical Society sponsors an Annual Meeting which brings together more than 6,000 scientists for symposia, workshops, industrial and educational exhibits, subgroup meetings, and awards presentations. The meeting features a talk by that year's Biophysical Society Lecturer, chosen for significance in biophysical research and excellence in presentation; the lectures are published in the Biophysical Journal, and those since 2003 are available on video. Starting in 2010 with "Calcium Signaling" in Beijing, the society now also sponsors 3-4 smaller thematic meetings annually across the world.

Since 2016, the Society has sponsored Biophysics Week each March. The week is a global event aimed at encouraging connections within the biophysics community and raising awareness of the field and its impact among the general public, policy makers, students, and scientists in the field.

== Awards ==
The Society currently offers awards each year to distinguished biophysicists in different categories. The awards are:

- Fellow of the Biophysical Society Award
- Founders Award
- Carolyn Cohen Innovation Award
- Rosalba Kampman Distinguished Service Award
- Emily M. Gray Award for Distinguished Educators
- Excellence in Undergraduate Education Award
- Michael and Kate Bárány Award
- Early Career Award
- Margaret Oakley Dayhoff Award
- Doctoral Research Award
- Agnes Pockels Award in Lipids and Membrane Biophysics (formerly the Avanti Award)
- Award in Membrane Protein Biophysics (formerly the Anatrace Award)
- Ignacio Tinoco Award in Physical Chemistry of Macromolecules
- Kazuhiko Kinosita Award in Single Molecule Biophysics
- Award in the Biophysics of Health and Disease
- Klaus Schulten and Zaida Luther-Shulten Award in Computational Biophysics

The Society also offers travel awards to its annual meeting, poster awards at Society-sponsored meetings, as well as other scientific conferences. The society sponsors "Biophysics Awards" at high school science fairs across the nation.

== Public policy ==
The Biophysical Society's Public Affairs committee responds to science policy issues such as research, careers, and science education, and has adopted a number of positions. In February 2004, the society released a statement supporting freedom of communication of scientific data, supporting the existing policy that prior classification strictly for national security reasons should be the only reason communication of scientific data should be restricted. The society also urged a reexamination of visa policy in the wake of several foreign-born scientists being denied permission to travel to the United States, citing the importance of their importance to the economy and security of the United States. In May 2005, the society released a statement opposing the teaching of intelligent design in science classrooms, calling it an "effort to blur the distinction between science and theology".

The society is also active in supporting federal funding of science, and provides materials to assist scientists in communicating with elected officials. The society participates in the annual Science-Engineering-Technology Congressional Visits Day, in which scientists, engineers and business leaders meet with elected officials in the United States Congress.

Beginning with the 2015-2016 year, the Biophysical Society has sponsored a congressional fellow through the AAAS Technology and Policy Fellowship Program. The purpose of the program is to provide an opportunity for BPS members to gain practical experience and insights into public policy by working on Capitol Hill while also allowing scientists to contribute their knowledge and analytical skills in the federal policy realm.

== See also ==
- British Biophysical Society
