= Cliff Addison =

British inorganic chemist

Cliff Addison FRS
- Born: Cyril Clifford Addison; 28 November 1913; Plumpton, Cumbria, England
- Died: 1 April 1994 (aged 80); Hale, Cheshire, England
- Awards: Fellow of the Royal Society (1970)
- Scientific career
- Workplaces: University of Nottingham
- Thesis: Adsorption at the interface between two fluids, with special reference to the adsorption of certain dyes at liquid-liquid interfaces (1936)
- Doctoral advisor: C. W. Gibby
- Doctoral students: Brian Johnson

Cyril Clifford Addison (28 November 1913 – 1 April 1994) was a British inorganic chemist. He was professor of inorganic chemistry at the University of Nottingham and was elected a Fellow of the Royal Society in 1970.

== Early life and education ==
Addison was born in the village of Plumpton, Cumberland in 1913. His father was a member of the Cumberland and Westmorland Constabulary and the family moved several times during his youth because of his father's work.

He entered Durham University in 1931. After graduating with honours in chemistry in 1934 he stayed on to do research in physical chemistry for his PhD degree, which was completed in 1936.

== Career ==
Addison worked in the Chemical Inspection Department of the Ministry of Supply from 1939 to 1945. In 1946, he joined the University of Nottingham, where he successively served as lecturer, reader and professor of inorganic chemistry until 1978. He was Leverhulme emeritus professor from 1978 until his death in 1994.

Addison was elected a Fellow of the Royal Society on 19 March 1970. He served as president of the Royal Society of Chemistry from 1976 to 1977.

== Personal life ==
Addison married Marjorie Thompson in 1939; they had one son, one daughter.

== Selected publications ==
=== Books ===
- Addison, C. C., ed. (1973). Inorganic Chemistry of the Main-Group Elements. Vol. 1. London: The Chemical Society. ISBN 9780851867526.
- ———, ed. (1974). Inorganic Chemistry of the Main-Group Elements. Vol. 2. London: The Chemical Society. ISBN 9780851867625.
- ———, ed. (1976). Inorganic Chemistry of the Main-Group Elements. Vol. 3. London: The Chemical Society. ISBN 9780851867724.
- ———, ed. (1977). Inorganic Chemistry of the Main-Group Elements. Vol. 4. London: The Chemical Society. ISBN 9780851867823.
- ———, ed. (1978). Inorganic Chemistry of the Main-Group Elements. Vol. 5. London: The Chemical Society. ISBN 9780851867922.
