= Journal of Proteomics =

- Discipline: Proteomics
- Language: English
- Edited by: Juan Calvete

Publication details
- Former names: Journal of Biochemical and Biophysical Methods
- History: 1979–present
- Publisher: Elsevier
- Frequency: 18/year
- Impact factor: 2.8 (2023)

Standard abbreviations
- ISO 4: J. Proteom.
- NLM: J Proteomics

Indexing
- CODEN: JPORFQ
- ISSN: 1874-3919
- LCCN: 2008243615
- OCLC no.: 191734490
- Journal of Biochemical and Biophysical Methods
- ISSN: 0165-022X

Links
- Journal homepage; Online archive

The Journal of Proteomics is a peer-reviewed scientific journal published by Elsevier. It is the official journal of the European Proteomics Association and the editor-in-chief is Juan Calvete. It was established in 1979 as the Journal of Biochemical and Biophysical Methods, obtaining its current name in 2008. According to the Journal Citation Reports, the journal has a 2018 impact factor of 3.537. Lello Zolla, an Italian molecular biologist, played a key role in the development of the Journal of Proteomics contributed significantly from 2008.
