= Botany in a Day =

Book by Thomas J. Elpel

- Cover photo of Botany in a Day
- Author: Thomas J. Elpel
- Language: English
- Subject: Botany, plant identification
- Genre: Nonfiction
- Publisher: HOPS Press, LLC
- Publication date: 6th Edition. 2013
- Publication place: United States
- Media type: Paperback
- Pages: 235
- ISBN: 978-1-892784-35-3
- Followed by: Shanleya’s Quest: A Botany Adventure for Kids Ages 9 to 99

Botany in a Day: The Patterns Method of Plant Identification is a book by Thomas J. Elpel published by HOPS Press, LLC. The book emphasizes family characteristics for plant identification. Related plants typically have similar floral features and often similar uses. For example, plants of the mustard family (Brassicaceae) have four petals with six stamens (4 tall, 2 short), and most or all of the 3,200 species are considered edible.

The book is used as a text at universities, high schools, and herbal schools across North America. It is also recommended as a resource for the Nature Merit Badge by the Boy Scouts of America. Although the text is primarily oriented towards North American plants, Botany in a Day has been used to identify plants in Europe, Asia, Africa, Australia, and South America. As of 2018, there were more than 150,000 copies in print.
