= Membrane biology =

Study of the characteristics of membranes

Membrane biology is the study of the biological and physiochemical characteristics of membranes, with applications in the study of cellular physiology.

Membrane bioelectrical impulses are described by the Hodgkin cycle.

== Biophysics ==
Membrane biophysics is the study of biological membrane structure and function using physical, computational, mathematical, and biophysical methods. A combination of these methods can be used to create phase diagrams of different types of membranes, which yields information on thermodynamic behavior of a membrane and its components. As opposed to membrane biology, membrane biophysics focuses on quantitative information and modeling of various membrane phenomena, such as lipid raft formation, rates of lipid and cholesterol flip-flop, protein-lipid coupling, and the effect of bending and elasticity functions of membranes on inter-cell connections.

== See also ==
- Amphiphile
- Biological membrane
- Collodion bag
- Lipid
- Lipid polymorphism
- Lipid rafts
- Membrane potential
- Protein–lipid interaction
- Trigger zone
