= European Biophysics Journal =

- Discipline: Biophysics
- Language: English
- Edited by: Robert Gilbert

Publication details
- History: 1974-present
- Publisher: Springer Science+Business Media
- Frequency: Monthly
- Impact factor: 1.733 (2020)

Standard abbreviations
- ISO 4: Eur. Biophys. J.

Indexing
- CODEN: EBJOE8
- ISSN: 0175-7571 (print); 1432-1017 (web)
- LCCN: 85641738
- OCLC no.: 11035862

Links
- Journal homepage

The European Biophysics Journal is published by Springer Science+Business Media on behalf of the European Biophysical Societies Association. The journal publishes papers in the field of biophysics, defining this as the study of biological phenomena using physical methods and concepts. It publishes original papers, reviews and letters. The journal aims "to advance the understanding of biological structure and function by application of the principles of physical science, and by presenting the work in a biophysical context". The editor-in-chief of the journal is Robert Gilbert (University of Oxford).

== Scope and indexing ==
Areas of research frequently published in the European Biophysics Journal include: structure and dynamics of biological macromolecules, membrane biophysics and ion channels, cell biophysics and organisation, macromolecular assemblies, biophysical methods and instrumentation, advanced microscopy, and system dynamics.

Among others, the journal is abstracted/indexed in: Chemical Abstracts Service, EMBASE, PubMed, Science Citation Index, and Scopus. According to the Journal Citation Reports, the European Biophysics Journal had a 2020 impact factor of 1.733.
