= Chantell Evans =

American cell biologist

Chantell Skye Evans
- Education: University of Wisconsin–Madison; Southern Illinois University
- Scientific career
- Workplaces: University of Pennsylvania Perelman School of Medicine; Duke University
- Thesis: The biophysics of synaptotagmin-1 action (2015)
- Doctoral advisor: Edwin Chapman
- Other academic advisors: Erika Holzbaur
- Website: https://www.evansresearchlab.com

Chantell Skye Evans is an American cell biologist and professor at Duke University. Her research focuses on the dynamic processes of mitochondria and their role in neurodegenerative disease. In 2022, Popular Science named her as one of their "Brilliant 10" U.S. scientists and engineers.

== Early life and education ==
Evans grew up in a small town in central Illinois, in a majority-white neighborhood. She was awarded a Gates Millennium Scholarship to pursue studies at university. Evans was an undergraduate student at the Southern Illinois University, where she studied chemistry was part of the Research Experiences for Undergraduates scheme, and spent her junior year in the laboratory of Punit Kohli. Evans moved to the University of Wisconsin–Madison to complete a doctorate in the lab of Edwin Chapman. Her doctoral research considered the regulation of Ca²⁺ in exocytosis. She moved to the University of Pennsylvania Perelman School of Medicine and joined Erika Holzbaur for postdoctoral research. In 2017, she was named a Howard Hughes Medical Institute Fellow.

== Research and career ==
Evans joined the faculty at Duke University in 2021.

Evans uses cell biology to understand how cells deal with malfunctioning mitochondria in neurons, a process known as mitophagy. Patients with Parkinson's disease typically show mutations on two proteins, PINK1 and Parkin. However, when these proteins are disabled in mice, the mice do not exhibit Parkinson's disease. Evans wondered whether mitochondria, the "powerhouse of the cell", may play a role in the development of the neurodegenerative disease. She uncovered that eradicating malfunctioning mitochondria is slower in neurons than it is in epithelial cells, which indicates that defective mitophagy in neurons contributes to neurodegeneration.

In 2022, Evans was named a Fellow of the Chan Zuckerberg Initiative Science Diversity Leadership program. Popular Science also named her as one of their "Brilliant 10" U.S. scientists and engineers who are succeeding in addressing key challenges in science.

== Research Grants ==
- How does selective autophagy dysfunction contribute to neurodegeneration awarded by Chan Zuckerberg Initiative 2022 - 2027
- Training Program in Developmental and Stem Cell Biology awarded by National Institutes of Health 2001 - 2027
- Cell and Molecular Biology Training Program awarded by National Institutes of Health 2021 - 2026
- Investigating mitochondrial turnover in homeostasis and disease awarded by Alfred P. Sloan Foundation 2022 - 2024
- HHMI Hanna H. Gray Fellows Program: Mitochondrial surveillance in neuronal homeostasis and disease awarded by Howard Hughes Medical Institute 2021 - 2024
- Neurobiology Training Program awarded by National Institutes of Health 2019 - 2024

== Selected publications ==
- Huisheng Liu; Hua Bai; Enfu Hui; Lu Yang; Chantell S Evans; Zhao Wang; Sung E Kwon; Edwin Chapman (2014). "Synaptotagmin 7 functions as a Ca2+-sensor for synaptic vesicle replenishment". eLife. 3 e01524. arXiv:1401.6207. doi:10.7554/elife.01524. PMC 3930910. PMID 24569478. Wikidata Q28507653.
- Atsushi Hoshino; Wei-Jia Wang; Shogo Wada; et al. (2019). "The ADP/ATP translocase drives mitophagy independent of nucleotide exchange". Nature. 575 (7782): 375–379. doi:10.1038/s41586-019-1667-4. PMC 6858570. PMID 31618756. Wikidata Q90748326.
- Chantell S Evans; Erika Holzbaur (2018). "Autophagy and mitophagy in ALS". Neurobiology of Disease. 122: 35–40. doi:10.1016/j.nbd.2018.07.005. PMC 6366665. PMID 29981842. Wikidata Q89454538.
