= Margaret Oakley Dayhoff Award =

American award given for biophysical research

The Margaret Oakley Dayhoff Award from the Biophysical Society in Rockville, Maryland, is given to a woman who "holds very high promise or has achieved prominence while developing the early stages of a career in biophysical research". It is "one of the top national honors" in biophysics. The award was established in 1984 in honor of Margaret Dayhoff, a biophysicist associated with the Biophysical Society and the National Biomedical Research Foundation.

== Award recipients ==
Source: Biophysical Society

- 1984/85: Dagmar Ringe and Bonnie Ann Wallace
- 1985/86: Barbara A. Lewis
- 1986/87: Barbara E. Ehrlich
- 1987/88: Rachel E. Klevit
- 1988/89: Nancy L. Thompson
- 1989/90: Anne Walter
- 1990/91: Jeanne Rudzki Small
- 1991/92: Hazel M. Holden and Francine R. Smith
- 1992/93: Carol Vandenberg
- 1993/94: Jean S. Baum
- 1994/95: Hillary C. M. Nelson
- 1995/96: Lynne Regan
- 1996/97: Susan Marqusee
- 1997/98: Bonnie Anne Berger
- 1998/99: Judith R. Mourant
- 1999: Lydia Gregoret
- 2000/2001: Millie M. Georgiadis and Ka Yee Christina Lee
- 2002: Gina MacDonald
- 2003: Hao Wu
- 2004: Dorothee Kern
- 2005: Sarah Keller
- 2006: Anne Hinderliter
- 2007: Kalina Hristova
- 2008: Judith Klein-Seetharaman
- 2009: Teresa Giraldez, Adrienne L. Fairhall, and Jin Zhang
- 2010: Crina Nimigean and Maria Spies
- 2011: Diane Lidke
- 2012: Lucy R. Forrest
- 2013: Jennifer L. Ross and Katherine Henzler-Wildman
- 2014: Sarah Veatch
- 2015: Antonina Roll-Mecak
- 2016: Sophie Dumont and Polina Lishko
- 2017: Julie S. Biteen
- 2018: Carrie L. Partch
- 2019: Meytal Landau
- 2020: Valeria Vásquez
- 2021: Randy Stockbridge
- 2022: Gabriela Schlau-Cohen
- 2023: Elizabeth H. Kellogg

== See also ==
- List of biology awards
- List of prizes, medals, and awards for women in science
- Prizes named after people
