= Antonina Roll-Mecak =

Romanian biophysicist

- Born: Romania
- Education: Cooper Union; Rockefeller University
- Known for: Studies on microtubule dynamics regulation, the tubulin code, microtubule severing enzymes
- Children: 1
- Awards: Margaret Oakley Dayhoff Award (2015); Keith R. Porter Fellow (2017); International Award from the Biochemical Society (2023)
- Scientific career
- Fields: Biochemistry, Structural Biology, Cell Biology
- Workplaces: University of California, San Francisco; Marine Biological Laboratory; National Institutes of Health
- Thesis: X-Ray Structures of the Universal Translation Initiation Factor IF2/eIF5B: Conformational Changes on GDP and GTP Binding (2000)
- Doctoral advisor: Stephen K. Burley
- Other academic advisors: Ronald D. Vale

Antonina Roll-Mecak (born in Sibiu, Romania) is a Romanian-born American molecular biophysicist. She is currently the Senior Investigator and Chief of the Unit of Cell Biology and Biophysics at the National Institutes of Health. She holds appointments at the National Institute of Neurological Disorders and Stroke and at the Biochemistry and Biophysics Center of the National Heart, Lung and Blood Institute. Roll-Mecak is known for her work on cytoskeletal regulation, mechanisms of microtubule severing enzymes (spastin and Katanin) and microtubule repair, and for her pioneering work in deciphering the complexities of the tubulin code. Her work is relevant to the treatment of cancer and nervous system disorders.

== Early life and education ==
Antonina Roll-Mecak was born in Romania. Growing up, her father tutored her in Newtonian physics, creating complex pulley-related problems for her to solve, and taught her the principles of programming through Fortran punch cards. During summers, she attended camps focused on math and science, and trained for academic Olympiads. She also spent summer breaks training for and competing in piano competitions, and as a child she aspired to be a concert pianist.

Roll-Mecak attended high school at the Gheorghe Lazăr National College in Sibiu, in the Transylvania region. The school specializes in science education. She received her bachelor's degree in chemical engineering from Cooper Union in New York City, which operates on a full-tuition scholarship basis. During her undergraduate studies, she completed a summer internship at Mount Sinai School of Medicine, where she worked with Ernie Mehler and Harel Weinstein. Part of her inspiration to pursue structural biology came from a seminar on protein structure she attended at the New York Academy of Sciences as a student. She received her Bachelor of Engineering summa cum laude in 1996.

Roll-Mecak received her PhD in molecular biophysics in 2002 from the Rockefeller University. There, she studied with Stephen Burley, and was mentored by other notable scientists such as Günter Blobel and Roderick MacKinnon. Her PhD work used X-ray crystallography to determine the structure and mechanism of the two translation initiation GTPases essential for assembling an 80S ribosome primed for protein synthesis.

== Career ==
After receiving her doctorate, she worked at the University of California, San Francisco, from 2003 to 2009 as a Damon Runyon and Burroughs Wellcome Career Award postdoctoral fellow with Ron Vale. There, Antonina Roll-Mecak identified spastin as a novel microtubule-severing enzyme and used hybrid structural biology methods and light microscopy to reveal the first three dimensional structure of a microtubule severing enzyme and to unravel its mechanism of action. Her analyses led to the proposal that severing enzymes break the microtubule by pulling single tubulin dimers out of the microtubule lattice.

In 2010 she became a principal investigator and unit head at the National Institutes of Health with a primary appointment in the National Institute of Neurological Disorders and Stroke (NINDS) and a joint appointment in the Biochemistry and Biophysics Center at the National Heart, Lung and Blood Institute (NHLBI). In 2017 Roll-Mecak became a tenured Senior Investigator. Her work focuses on how the genetic (isoform variation) and chemical diversity (posttranslational modifications) of tubulin regulates the dynamics and mechanical properties of microtubules and constitutes a code that is interpreted by microtubule based motors and associated proteins. This code is also referred to as the "tubulin code.".

== Personal life ==
Roll-Mecak has a son. In her spare time, she enjoys classical music, and has noted that while in graduate school in New York City she often attended concerts in between running her experiments.

When a colleague leaves her lab, Roll-Mecak is known to give them a daruma doll, a lucky charm in Japanese folk culture that comes with its eyes unpainted. The recipient paints in one of the eyes and makes a wish, and the second eye is added when the wish is granted.

== Awards ==
- Burroughs Wellcome Career Award
- NIH Pathway to Independence Award
- Searle Scholar Award (2010)
- Margaret Oakley Dayhoff Award from the Biophysical Society (2015)
- Blavatnik National Awards for Young Scientists (2016)
- Keith R. Porter Award (2017)
- Emerging Leader Prize from the American Society for Cell Biology (2016)
- International Award from the Biochemical Society (2023)
- The Hans Neurath Award from the Protein Society (2025)

== Select publications ==
- Chen, Jiayi; Kholina, Ekaterina; Szyk, Agnieszka; Fedorov, Vladimir A.; Kovalenko, Ilya; Gudimchuk, Nikita; Roll-Mecak, Antonina (2021-07-26). "α-tubulin tail modifications regulate microtubule stability through selective effector recruitment, not changes in intrinsic polymer dynamics". Developmental Cell. 56 (14): 2016–2028.e4. doi:10.1016/j.devcel.2021.05.005. ISSN 1878-1551. PMC 8476856. PMID 34022132.
- Roll-Mecak, Antonina (2020-07-06). "The Tubulin Code in Microtubule Dynamics and Information Encoding". Developmental Cell. 54 (1): 7–20. doi:10.1016/j.devcel.2020.06.008. ISSN 1534-5807. PMC 11042690. PMID 32634400. S2CID 220411182.
- Roll-Mecak, Antonina (2019-02-01). "How cells exploit tubulin diversity to build functional cellular microtubule mosaics". Current Opinion in Cell Biology. Cell Architecture. 56: 102–108. doi:10.1016/j.ceb.2018.10.009. ISSN 0955-0674. PMC 7214606. PMID 30466050.
- Vemu, Annapurna; Szczesna, Ewa; Zehr, Elena A.; Spector, Jeffrey O.; Grigorieff, Nikolaus; Deaconescu, Alexandra M.; Roll-Mecak, Antonina (2018-08-24). "Severing enzymes amplify microtubule arrays through lattice GTP-tubulin incorporation". Science. 361 (6404): eaau1504. doi:10.1126/science.aau1504. ISSN 1095-9203. PMC 6510489. PMID 30139843.
- Zehr, Elena A.; Szyk, Agnieszka; Szczesna, Ewa; Roll-Mecak, Antonina (2020-01-06). "Katanin Grips the β-Tubulin Tail through an Electropositive Double Spiral to Sever Microtubules". Developmental Cell. 52 (1): 118–131.e6. doi:10.1016/j.devcel.2019.10.010. ISSN 1878-1551. PMC 7060837. PMID 31735665.
- Roll-Mecak, Antonina; Vale, Ronald D. (2005-04-12). "The Drosophila Homologue of the Hereditary Spastic Paraplegia Protein, Spastin, Severs and Disassembles Microtubules". Current Biology. 15 (7): 650–655. doi:10.1016/j.cub.2005.02.029. ISSN 0960-9822. PMID 15823537. S2CID 497867.
