= Edwin Chapman =

Edwin Chapman may refer to:

- Edwin Chapman (biochemist) (born 1962), American biochemist
- Edwin Nesbit Chapman (1819–1888), American physician
- Ed Chapman (baseball) (Edwin Volney Chapman, 1905–2000), American Major League Baseball pitcher
- Eddie Chapman (footballer) (Edwin Maude Chapman, 1923–2002), English football player and chairman
