= Barbara E. Ehrlich =

American biologist and academic (born 1952)

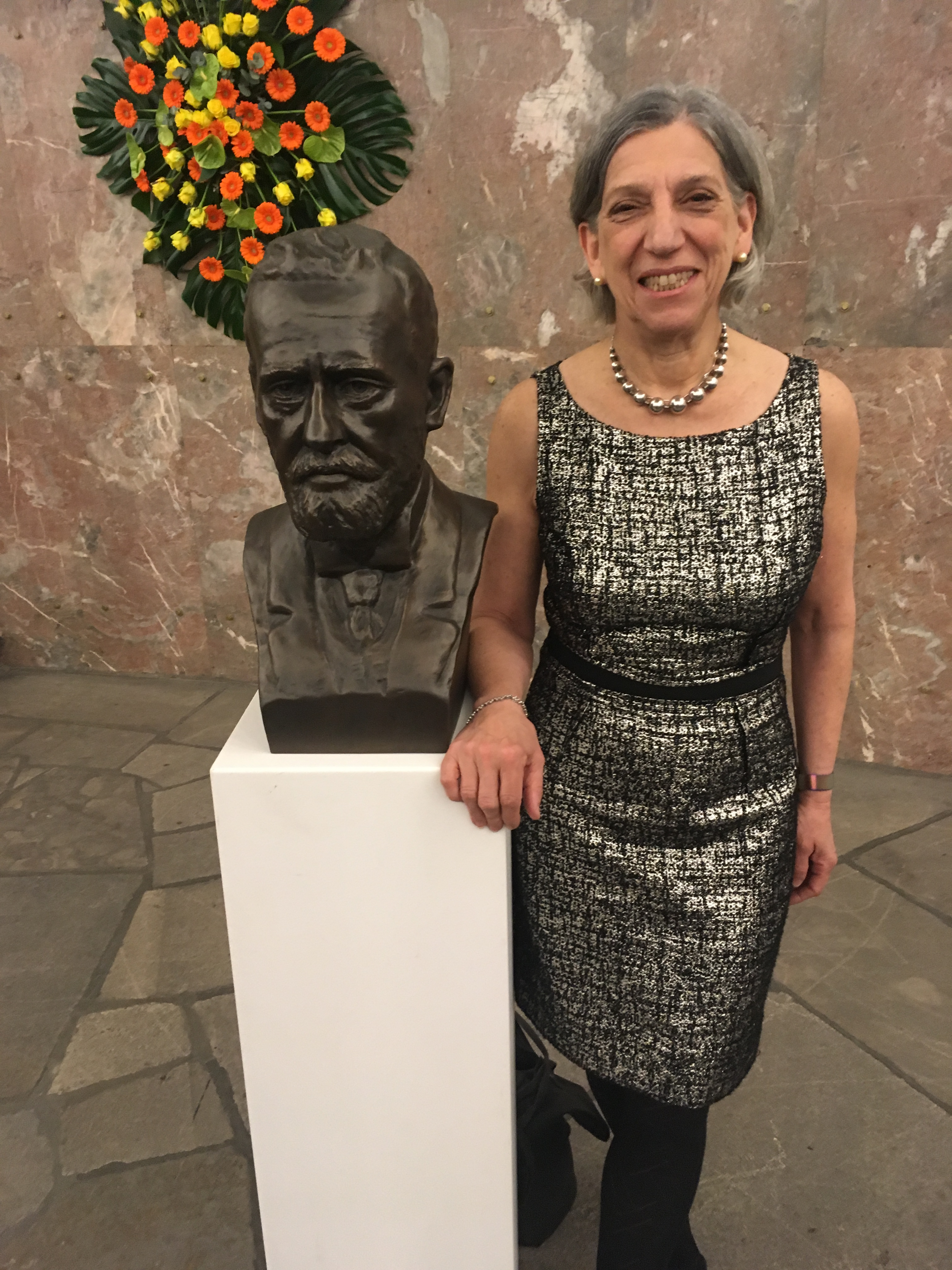
- Born: 1952 (age 73–74); New London, Connecticut
- Education: Brown University (ScB); University of California Los Angeles (PhD)
- Known for: Lithium transport and bipolar disorder Prevention of chemotherapy induced peripheral neuropathy
- Spouses: Lawrence B. Cohen (m. 1984–2004) Stuart M. Johnson (m. 2019)
- Children: 1
- Awards: Margaret Oakley Dayhoff Award in Biophysics(1997); K.S. Cole Award for Excellence in Membrane Biophysics (2005)
- Scientific career
- Fields: Physiology, biophysics, pharmacology
- Doctoral advisor: Jared Diamond

Barbara E. Ehrlich is Professor of Pharmacology and of Cellular and Molecular Physiology at Yale University working on the biophysics of membrane ion channels. Recent research investigates the function of polycystin-2, the inositol trisphosphate receptor, and the ryanodine receptor.

== Early life and education ==
Ehrlich was born in New London, CT in 1952 and grew up in Newport, RI. Ehrlich attended Brown University, where she received a Bachelor of Science: ScB in Applied Mathematics and Biology. She then received her PhD from the University of California at Los Angeles in 1979 on the topic of membrane transport parameters in bipolar disorder. In 1974 she was a pre-doctoral Student at Brown University and Mount Desert Island Biological Laboratory, Providence, RI and Salsbury Cove, ME. Her research focused on iodide transport in the choroid plexus epithelium.

== Career ==
At Brown University, Ehrlich worked with Helen Cserr, Professor of Physiology. Her doctoral advisor was Jared Diamond and she studied lithium transport in human red blood cells as a way to understand lithium treatment in bipolar disorder. Ehrlich completed her post doctoral research at the Albert Einstein College of Medicine and the Marine Biological Laboratory at Woods Hole. In 1972, while working at the Marine Biological Laboratory, Ehrlich experienced gender discrimination as a woman in science. She had to advocate for her opportunity to attend scientific lectures and became the only woman participating in them. She then went on to work as a professor at the University of Connecticut for 11 years. At the University of Connecticut, she coined the term "Molecular Hermeneutics." Hermeneutics is a philosophical discipline derived from Hermes, who was the Messenger of the Gods and had to both deliver and interpret messages. Hermeneutics became the exegesis of the Bible, and eventually it evolved to interpretation, in particular of Truth and Beauty. She continues to be the Director of the Laboratory of Molecular Hermeneutics at Yale University, where she presently works.

Ehrlich began working at Yale University in 1997 as a professor of pharmacology and of cellular and molecular physiology. At Yale, Ehrlich has mainly focused on intracellular calcium regulation. Her laboratory uses calcium imaging combined with electrophysiological, biochemical, and molecular techniques to study the classes of calcium release channels known to exist inside virtually all cells: the inositol trisphosphate receptor-gated channel, the ryanodine receptor, and polycystin 2. Ehrlich and her team work to understand the loss of calcium regulation observed in disease states as seen in cells from patients with polycystic kidney disease or leading to drug-induced peripheral neuropathy. The Ehrlich team hypothesizes that these abnormalities in function are consequences, at least in part, of altered intracellular calcium homeostasis and that these studies will lead to suitable treatment regimens.

From 2004 to 2011, Ehrlich was on the board of scientific counselors at the Eunice Kennedy Shriver National Institute of Child Health and Human Development.

== Awards ==
- 1979-1980 Bank of America – Giannini Foundation Fellowship
- 1980-summer Grass Foundation Fellowship in Neurophysiology
- 1980-1982 Sidney Blackmer Postdoctoral Fellowship, Muscular Dystrophy Foundation
- 1983-1986 Kurt P. Reiman Investigatorship, New York Heart Association
- 1983-1986 The American Home Products Grant-in-Aid, New York Heart Association
- 1986-summer M.B.L. Summer Fellowship
- 1986-1990 Pew Scholar in Biomedical science
- 1987 The Margaret Oakley Dayhoff Award in Biophysics
- 1987-summer M.B.L. Kuffler Fellowship
- 1992, 1995 CAMEL Award for Best Pre-Clinical Course. Co-Organizer, Cardiovascular Subject Committee
- 1995 Blue Ribbon for Blueberry Pie, Barnstable County Fair, Falmouth, MA
- 1996 H.F. Cserr Memorial Lecture, Mount Desert Island Biological Laboratory
- 2005 K.S. Cole Award for Excellence in Membrane Biophysics, Biophysical Society

== Elected offices ==
- 1989-1993 Trustee, Marine Biological Laboratory
- 1988-1990 Councilor, Society of General Physiologists
- 1993-1999 Science Council, Marine Biological Laboratory
- 1995-1996 President, Society of General Physiologists
- 1995-1998 Councillor, Biophysical Society
- 2002-2008 Trustee, Children's School of Science, Woods Hole, Massachusetts
- 2004-2010 Science Council, Marine Biological Laboratory
- 2012-2016 Biological Science Advisory Committee, Yale University
- 2012-2016 Tenure Appointments Committee for the Biological Sciences, Yale University
- 2013–present Wine steward, Berkeley College (Yale University)

== Personal life ==
Ehrlich was married to Lawrence B. Cohen, Professor of Cellular and Molecular Physiology at Yale University. Ehrlich has one daughter, and is presently married to Stuart M. Johnson. Ehrlich splits her time between New York City and New Haven, Connecticut.
