= Paul Schimmel =

American chemist

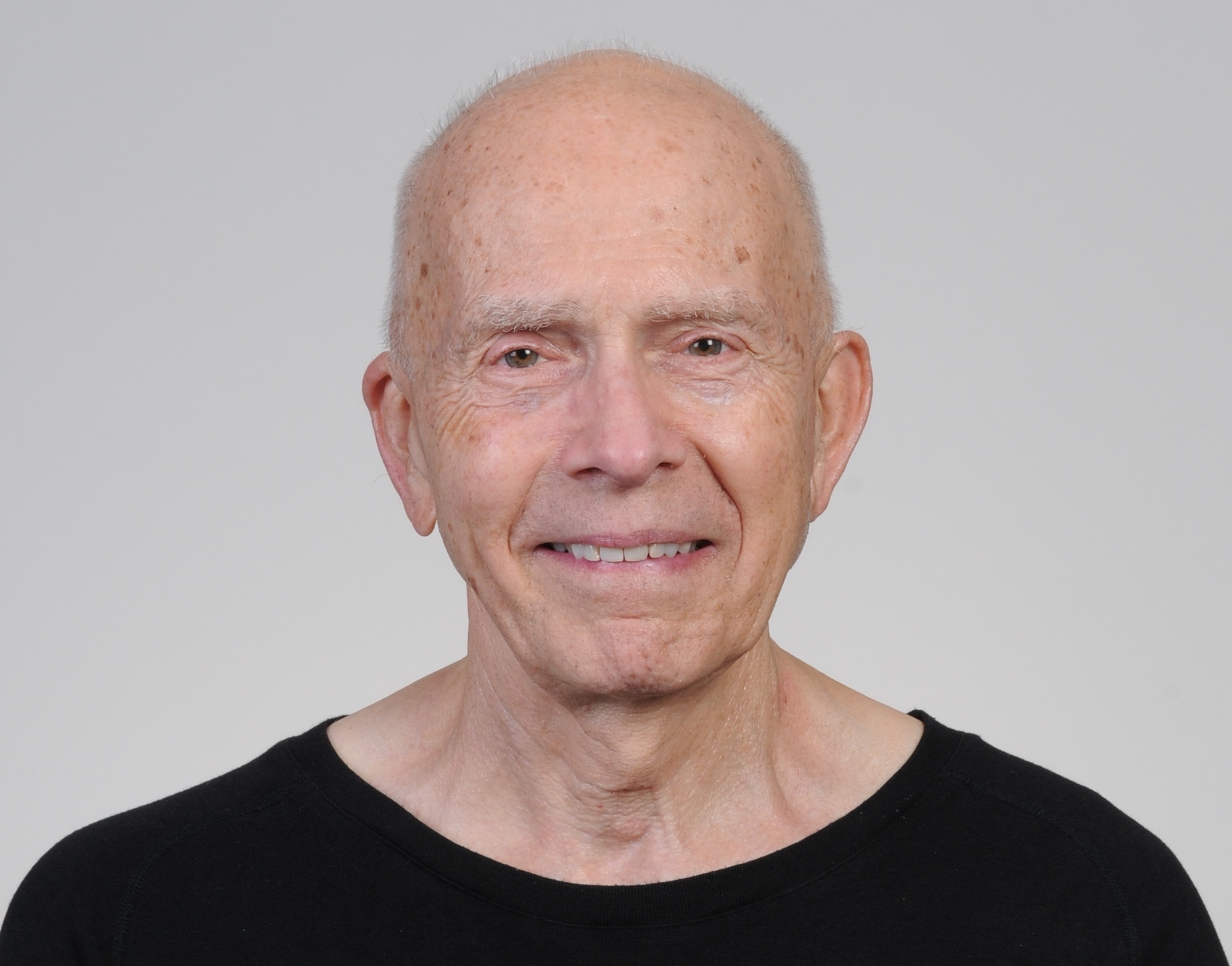
- Born: August 4, 1940 (age 86); Hartford, Connecticut
- Education: Ohio Wesleyan University (B.A.); Massachusetts Institute of Technology (Ph.D.)
- Awards: Pfizer Award in Enzyme Chemistry (1978); Emily M. Gray Award for Significant Contributions to Education in Biophysics; Stein and Moore Award of the Protein Society; Kathryn C. Hach Award for Entrepreneurial Success
- Scientific career
- Fields: Biochemistry/Molecular Medicine
- Doctoral students: Maria Jasin, Lynne Regan

Paul Reinhard Schimmel (born August 4, 1940) is an American biophysical chemist and translational medicine pioneer.

== Career ==
Paul Schimmel is a Professor of Molecular Medicine at The Scripps Research Institute. Prior to joining The Scripps Research Institute, he was a John D. and Catherine T. MacArthur Professor of Biochemistry and Biophysics at MIT (Massachusetts Institute of Technology). Author or coauthor of many scientific research publications, he is also coauthor of a widely used 3-volume textbook on biophysical chemistry. His research interests have focused on aminoacyl tRNA synthetases as fundamental interpreters of the genetic information. Through career-long investigations of this ancient and universal set of essential enzymes, his laboratory has worked on a universal mechanism for correcting errors in the interpretation of genetic information, and went on to show how this mechanism is essential for maintaining cellular homeostasis and for preventing serious pathologies and disease. He has also been listed as one of the leading translational researchers in the world, having one of the top five most cited patents for the period 2012-2016.

His laboratory also discovered what others have referred to as a tRNA synthetase-directed primordial, or 'second', genetic code that eventually was incorporated into the modern code. In a separate line of research published back in 1983, Schimmel developed the concept of what are now known as ESTs (expressed sequence tags) and the strategy of shotgun sequencing, approaches that several years later were adopted for the human genome project. Nature magazine listed Schimmel's work on the development of ESTs as one of the four key developments that launched the human genome project. Lastly, his laboratory established connections of synthetases to disease and, most recently, they reported the structural and functional metamorphosis of these proteins, whereby they are repurposed with novel activities, both inside and outside the cell, in a variety of cell signaling pathways

== Honors ==
Named to various society and university awards and honorary degrees, and elected to membership in the American Academy of Arts and Sciences, the National Academy of Sciences, the American Philosophical Society, the Institute of Medicine (National Academy of Medicine) and National Academy of Inventors. Active in many scientific and academic organizations and committees, including past service as President of the Division of Biological Chemistry of the American Chemical Society (presently with over 7,000 members) and as an editorial board member of numerous scientific journals. In June 2020, he was named the 2020 winner of the Kathryn C. Hach Award for Entrepreneurial Success for "co-founding more than ten biotech companies and aiding others in their endeavors for nearly three decades." Named the ARCS San Diego Chapter 2020 Scientist of the Year
