= Sarah Veatch =

American biophysicist

Sarah Louise Veatch
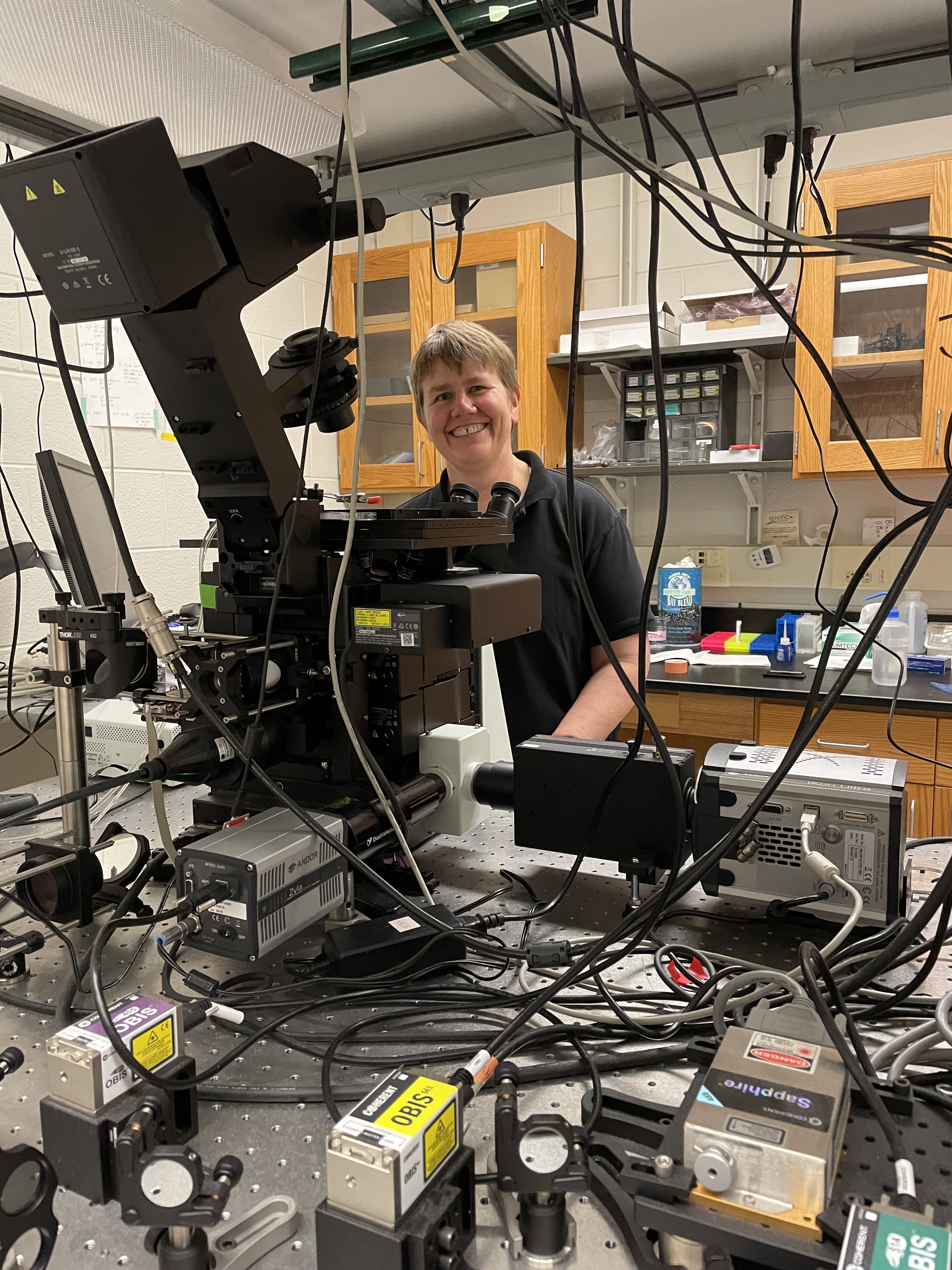
- Sarah Veatch in her laboratory at the University of Michigan in 2026
- Born: Brookline, Massachusetts
- Education: University of Washington (Ph.D.); MIT (B.S.)
- Awards: Sloan Research Fellow (2012); Margaret Oakley Dayhoff Award (2014); Agnes Pockels Award in Lipids and Membrane Biophysics (2026)
- Scientific career
- Fields: Biophysics
- Workplaces: University of Michigan (2010–)
- Thesis: Phenomenology of constrained supersymmetry (2004)
- Doctoral advisor: Sarah L. Keller

Sarah Louise Veatch is an American biophysicist, professor of biophysics at University of Michigan.

== Early life ==
Veatch was raised in Brookline, Massachusetts by her mother, a medical doctor, and her father, William R. Veatch, a membrane biophysicist.

== Education ==
Veatch's interest in physics began in high school. She was involved in her high school's gay–straight alliance in the mid-1990s "but struggled with her LGBT identity until college". She earned a B.S. in physics in 1998 from Massachusetts Institute of Technology (MIT). Her undergraduate thesis was titled VLF magnetic field correlation measurements between LIGO sites. Her thesis supervisor was Rainer Weiss.

Veatch worked for a year as an electrical engineer, programming lighting consoles used in auditoriums. In 2004, she completed her Ph.D. in physics at University of Washington under her advisor Sarah L. Keller, after which she conducted one year of postdoctoral studies with Robert E. W. Hancock at University of British Columbia. She also worked with Jenifer Thewalt at Simon Fraser University. Veatch completed further postdoctoral studies with Barbara A. Baird and David Holowka at Cornell University. Here, she built upon her Ph.D. work, exploring phase separation in isolated biological membranes.

== Career ==
After her postdoctoral work, Veatch was hired as an Assistant Professor of Biophysics at the University of Michigan,, was promoted to the position of associate professor in May 2017, and is now the Daniel Axelrod Collegiate Professor of Biophysics and Physics, as well as the Director of Biophysics.

She researches the physical properties of lipids and the influence on the plasma membrane function. She investigates signalling pathways initiated in the membrane and has developed new super-resolution fluorescence microscopy techniques to further study interactions in the membrane.

Veatch was a Presidential Visiting Fellow of Yale University 2019-2020 where she investigated on ion channel function and phase transitions in membranes and polymers in collaboration with Ben Machta.

Recently, Veatch has examined the role of lipid phase behavior in organizing plasma membrane components, or correlations between the partitioning preferences of membrane-anchored probes in giant plasma membrane vesicles (GPMVs) and their organization in live cells. Veatch has proposed a theory in which proximity to a membrane phase transition drives the formation of membrane domains.

== Awards and honors ==
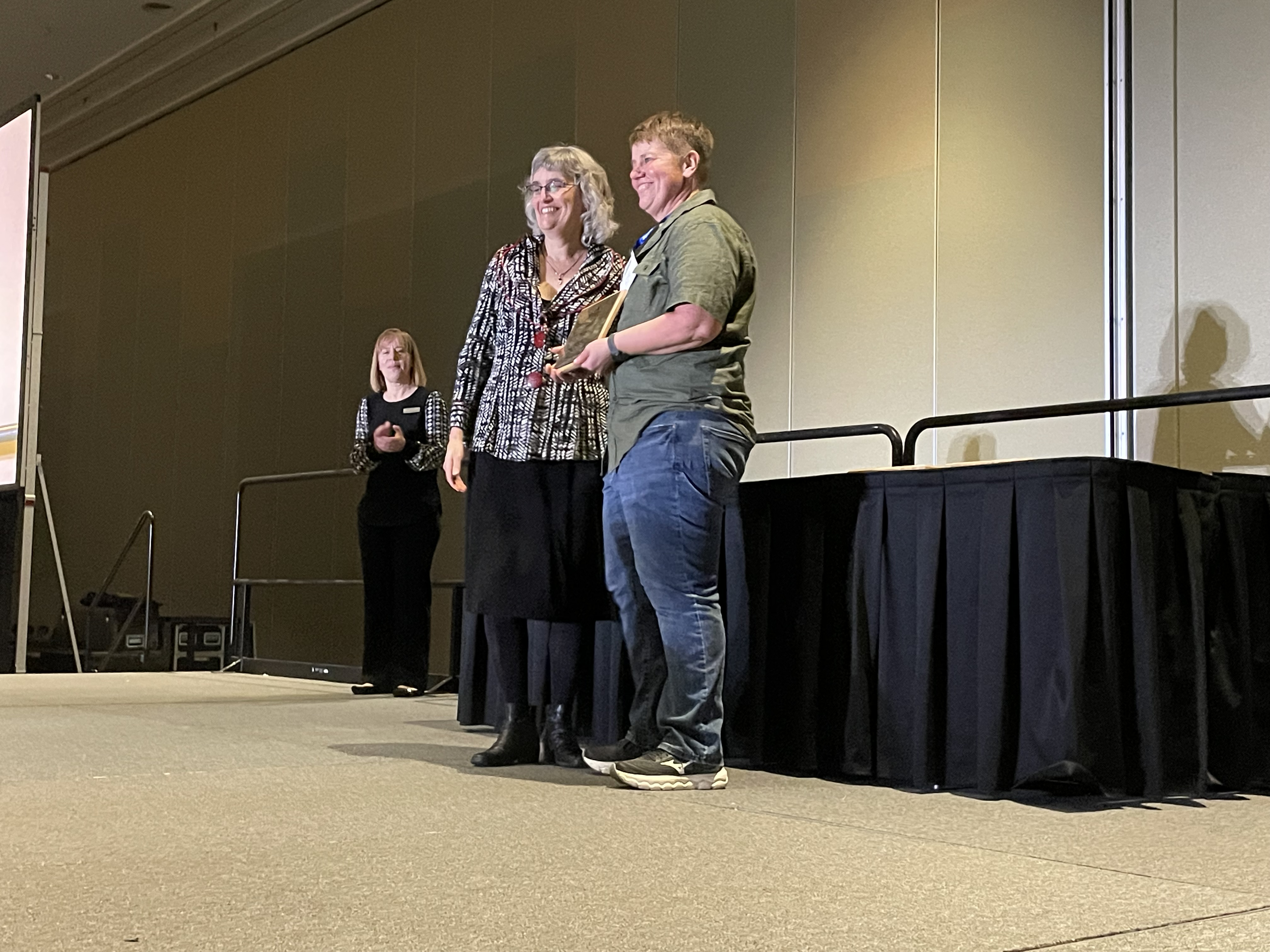
Veatch accepts the 2026 Pockels Award from Lynmarie Thompson, President of the Biophysical Society

In 2012, Veatch won a Sloan Research Fellowship. In 2014, she was awarded the Margaret Oakley Dayhoff Award "for her substantial contributions to the field of membrane physical chemistry as it translates into biological systems."

She was named a Fellow of the American Physical Society in 2023, "for foundational work in understanding the miscibility phase transition and associated critical phenomena in membranes, and for rigorously applying these physical concepts to biological processes".

Veatch won the 2025 Tom Thompson Award from the Membrane Structure and Function Subgroup of the Biophysical Society for her "contributions to the understanding of membrane structure and cell signaling".

In 2026, she was honored with the Agnes Pockels Award in Lipids and Membrane Biophysics from the Biophysical Society.
