= Charles Sanders =

Charles Sanders may refer to:

- Charles Sanders Peirce (1839–1914), American scientist, mathematician, logician, and philosopher
- Charles R. Sanders, American biophysical chemist
- Charlie Sanders (1946–2015), American football tight end
- Charlie Sanders (actor) (born 1979), American actor, comedian and writer
- Chuck Sanders (born 1964), American football running back
