= Dorothee Kern =

German biochemist (born 1966)

- Born: 19 January 1966 (age 60); Halle, Germany
- Spouse: Gunther Kern
- Children: Julia Kern; Nadja Kern
- Awards: Pfizer Award in Enzyme Chemistry (2003); Margaret Oakley Dayhoff Award (2004)

Academic background
- Education: Martin Luther University; UC Berkeley
- Thesis: NMR-spektroskopische Untersuchungen zur Dynamik der Cis-trans-Isomerisierung am Prolin und deren Katalyse durch Cyclophilin (1995)

Academic work
- Discipline: Biochemistry
- Institutions: Brandeis University

Dorothee Kern (born 1966) is a professor of Integrative Structural and Computational Biology at Scripps Research and former player for the East German national basketball team.

In 2016, she cofounded Relay Therapeutics, a Massachusetts-based drug research company studying the motion of proteins using genomic data and computational biology. In 2020, she cofounded MOMA Therapeutics, a company working on drug discovery.

In 2017 she became a member of the German Academy of Sciences Leopoldina, a scientific advisory body to the German government and citizens that serves as a liaison between the German scientific community and the rest of the world.

== Life and career ==
=== Early life ===
Born in Halle, a town in former East Germany, to parents Gerhard and Gertraude Hübner, she was an energetic child who began learning to play basketball as early as age seven. She achieved her goal of playing for the East German national basketball team by the time she was a teenager playing the position point guard, and she served as captain of the team. Both of her parents were employed by Martin Luther University as biochemists.

Growing up in Communist East Germany, Kern and her family experienced backlash and obstacles from the government due to their lack of support of the Communist party. The Hübner family would not work in conjunction with the East German government or their loyal police force, the Stasi. This led to surveillance of the family by the government, as well as the loss of her mother's job and the stunting of her father's career. Due to the division between East and West Germany and the Communist Party, scientists in East Germany rarely had the opportunity to collaborate with scientists from the West, thus limiting the Hübner family's access to other research, tools, and scientific equipment that researchers utilized in the West Germany.

=== Education ===
Kern attended Martin Luther University in Halle, Germany and received her B.S, M.S, and Ph.D. in biochemistry from the institution. She also attended UC Berkeley where she completed postdoctoral work.

=== Family ===
Kern is married to Gunther Kern and has two daughters, Julia and Nadja. Julia Kern attended Dartmouth College and is a member of the US Ski Team, participating in the cross-country skiing event. Nadja Kern attended UC San Diego and played on the women's basketball team at the university. She is now attending graduate school at UCSF studying biophysics.

== Research ==
She has published papers on, and continues to research, protein folding, especially using NMR techniques. Examples of her research include the activation of proteins and changes in protein shape and the connection to allosteric regulation.

Kern's major research area of focus involves protein dynamics and how proteins move over time. Along with her father and husband, Kern published a paper on Vitamin B1 enzyme activation and was able to record the process unfolding utilizing a combination of NMR spectroscopy, X-ray crystallography, and biological computing.

This granted Kern notability in the scientific community and ultimately paved the way for her tenure at Brandeis University where she continued her investigation of protein movement. After the founding of Relay Therapeutics in 2016, she began to apply her previous protein research to cancer biology. Along with her research team at Brandeis, Kern published a paper detailing their discoveries in which they utilized high-level biological computing and imaging to study the evolutionary shifts in protein structure of certain proteins and enzymes commonly involved in cancer over three million years of evolutionary history. This research was highly praised by the scientific community and has many potential future implications in specific targeting of anti-cancer drugs to cancer cells without affecting healthy cells.

Following this work, she was inducted into the German Academy of Scientists Leopoldina in 2017.

In 2020, Kern cofounded MOMA Therapeutics, a pharmaceutical company studying molecular machines and their role in disease. The goal of MOMA Therapeutics is to develop new drugs using the knowledge of molecular machines, protein conformational changes, and enzyme-substrate interaction in order to deliver medications more precisely.

=== Selected publications ===
- Henzler-Wildman, Katherine; Kern, Dorothee (2007). "Dynamic personalities of proteins". Nature. 450 (7172): 964–972. Bibcode:2007Natur.450..964H. doi:10.1038/nature06522. ISSN 0028-0836. PMID 18075575. S2CID 4412556.
- Eisenmesser, Elan Z.; Millet, Oscar; Labeikovsky, Wladimir; Korzhnev, Dmitry M.; Wolf-Watz, Magnus; Bosco, Daryl A.; Skalicky, Jack J.; Kay, Lewis E.; Kern, Dorothee (2005). "Intrinsic dynamics of an enzyme underlies catalysis". Nature. 438 (7064): 117–121. Bibcode:2005Natur.438..117E. doi:10.1038/nature04105. ISSN 0028-0836. PMID 16267559. S2CID 4380264.
- Kern, Dorothee; Zuiderweg, Erik RP (2003). "The role of dynamics in allosteric regulation". Current Opinion in Structural Biology. 13 (6): 748–757. doi:10.1016/j.sbi.2003.10.008. PMID 14675554.
- Kern, D. (1997-01-03). "How Thiamin Diphosphate Is Activated in Enzymes". Science. 275 (5296): 67–70. doi:10.1126/science.275.5296.67. PMID 8974393. S2CID 42796172.

== Awards and honors ==
- Young Investigator Award of the International Association for Protein Structure Analysis (2002)
- Pfizer Award in Enzyme Chemistry, American Chemical Society (2003)
- Margaret Oakley Dayhoff Award (2004)
- Howard Hughes Medical Institute Investigator (2005)
- National Lecturer of the Biophysical Society (2009)
