= Lucy Forrest =

British biophysicist

Lucy Rachel Forrest is a researcher at National Institute of Neurological Disorders and Stroke at the National Institutes of Health. She is known for her work on membrane proteins. She was granted the Margaret Oakley Dayhoff Award from the Biophysical Society in 2012 for her work in biophysics.

== Education and career ==
Forrest studied chemistry at the University of Surrey, UK, with a minor in computing and received her Bachelor of Science degree. She received her Ph.D. in biochemistry from the University of Oxford in 2000. From 2000 to 2001 Forrest was a grantee for the Fulbright Visiting Scholar Program. Forrest participated in Eli Lilly’s research site in Windlesham, Surrey, performed postdoctoral research at Johns Hopkins University School of Medicine, and did a second postdoctoral research period at the Medical Research Council's Dunn Human Nutrition Unit in Cambridge, UK. She moved to New York City, NY, USA in 2003 to work at Columbia University Medical School. In 2007, Forrest was designated the Max Planck Research Group Leader at the Max Planck Institute for Biophysics in Frankfurt, Germany. Forrest has worked at the National Institutes of Health in Bethesda, MD, USA since 2013. She received tenure in 2017 and was promoted to Senior Investigator.

== Research ==
Forrest's early research centered on simulating and modeling membrane proteins in lipid bilayers. She also examines secondary transport mechanisms, and has developed a database that allows for comparison of structural differences in membrane proteins.

== Selected publications ==
- Forrest, Lucy R.; Zhang, Yuan-Wei; Jacobs, Miriam T.; Gesmonde, Joan; Xie, Li; Honig, Barry H.; Rudnick, Gary (2008-07-29). "Mechanism for alternating access in neurotransmitter transporters". Proceedings of the National Academy of Sciences. 105 (30): 10338–10343. Bibcode:2008PNAS..10510338F. doi:10.1073/pnas.0804659105. ISSN 0027-8424. PMC 2480614. PMID 18647834.
- Forrest, Lucy R.; Rudnick, Gary (2009). "The Rocking Bundle: A Mechanism for Ion-Coupled Solute Flux by Symmetrical Transporters". Physiology. 24 (6): 377–386. doi:10.1152/physiol.00030.2009. ISSN 1548-9213. PMC 3012352. PMID 19996368.
- Forrest, Lucy R.; Krämer, Reinhard; Ziegler, Christine (2011-02-01). "The structural basis of secondary active transport mechanisms". Biochimica et Biophysica Acta (BBA) - Bioenergetics. 1807 (2): 167–188. doi:10.1016/j.bbabio.2010.10.014. ISSN 0005-2728. PMID 21029721.
- Liao, Ya-Cheng; Fernandopulle, Michael S.; Wang, Guozhen; Choi, Heejun; Hao, Ling; Drerup, Catherine M.; Patel, Rajan; Qamar, Seema; Nixon-Abell, Jonathon; Shen, Yi; Meadows, William; Vendruscolo, Michele; Knowles, Tuomas P. J.; Nelson, Matthew; Czekalska, Magdalena A. (2019-09-19). "RNA Granules Hitchhike on Lysosomes for Long-Distance Transport, Using Annexin A11 as a Molecular Tether". Cell. 179 (1): 147–164.e20. doi:10.1016/j.cell.2019.08.050. ISSN 0092-8674. PMC 6890474. PMID 31539493.

== Honors and awards ==
In 2012, she was a recipient of the Margaret Oakley Dayhoff Award for her research on “conformational changes of membrane proteins related to their function, and her impact on the field of computational structural biology”.
