= Rachel E. Klevit =

American biochemist and academic

- Education: Reed College, BA, 1978; Oxford University, D.Phil, 1981

Rachel E. Klevit is Professor of Biochemistry, Adjunct Professor of Chemistry, and Adjunct Professor of Pharmacology at the University of Washington. She holds the Edmond H. Fischer-Washington Research Foundation Endowed Chair in Biochemistry. Klevit's research focuses on molecular interactions in human diseases and includes research on BRCA1, the protein ubiquitination system, and human heat shock proteins.

== Education ==
Klevit received her B.A. in 1978 from Reed College and her D.Phil. from Oxford University in 1981. She completed her post-doctoral training at Duke University Medical Center.

== Awards ==
Klevit was awarded a Rhodes Scholarship in 1978 to attend Oxford University. She received the Margaret Oakley Dayhoff Award in Biophysics from the Biophysical Society in 1987–1988, the Fritz Lippmann Award from the American Society for Biochemistry and Molecular Biology in 2015, and the Dorothy Crowfoot Hodgkin Award from the Protein Society in 2016.

In 2021, Klevit was elected to the U.S. National Academy of Sciences.
