= Richard W. Aldrich =

American neuroscientist

- Education: University of Arizona; Stanford University; Yale University
- Awards: W. Alden Spencer Award (1995)
- Scientific career
- Fields: Neuroscience
- Workplaces: University of Texas; HHMI
- Academic advisors: W. Knox Chandler; Charles F. Stevens

Richard Warren Aldrich is an American neuroscientist who is currently the Karl Folkers Chair of Interdisciplinary Medical Research and Professor of Neurobiology in the School of Biological Sciences at the University of Texas.

== Early life ==
Graduating from the University of Arizona with a BS in Biological Sciences (1975), Aldrich went on to earn a Ph. D. in Neuroscience from Stanford University (1980). After completing a post-doctoral fellowship in physiology at Yale University under the direction of W. Knox Chandler and Charles F. Stevens, Aldrich was hired to teach at Yale, instructing in the Department of Molecular Neurobiology. In 1985, Aldrich returned to Stanford to teach neurobiology and physiology, eventually serving as Chair of the Department of Molecular and Cellular Physiology from 2001 to 2004. He was an Investigator in the Howard Hughes Medical Institute from 1990 until 2006. Aldrich's research has focused on the "molecular mechanisms of ion channel function and their role in electrical signaling." Aldrich has served as the president of the Society of General Physiologists and the Biophysical Society. Aldrich became a member of the National Academy of Sciences in 2008, and in 2011 was elected to the American Academy of Arts and Sciences.
