= Katherine Henzler-Wildman =

American biochemist

- Education: University of Michigan
- Scientific career
- Thesis: The mechanism of lipid bilayer disruption by the human antimicrobial peptide, LL-37 (2003)

Katherine Anne Henzler-Wildman is the Jean V. Thomas Professor in Biochemistry at the University of Wisconsin–Madison. She was elected a fellow of the American Association for the Advancement of Science in 2024. She is known for her work on how proteins control the movement of molecules across membranes.

== Education and career ==
Henzler-Wildman received a B.A. from Cornell University in 1998. She earned her Ph.D. from the University of Michigan in 2003. She then moved to Brandeis University where she worked with Dorothee Kern as a postdoctoral researcher until 2008 when she joined the faculty at Washington University in St. Louis. In 2015 moved to the University of Madison, and as of 2025 Henzler-Wildman is the Jean V. Thomas Professor in Biochemistry.

== Research ==
Henzler-Wildman's early research determined structural details of lipid membranes and the dynamics of protein folding. She has investigated the protein EmrE and demonstrated how this protein pushes toxic molecules out of microbial cells.

== Selected publications ==
- Henzler-Wildman, Katherine; Kern, Dorothee (2007-12-13). "Dynamic personalities of proteins". Nature. 450 (7172): 964–972. doi:10.1038/nature06522. ISSN 0028-0836.
- Henzler-Wildman, Katherine A.; Lei, Ming; Thai, Vu; Kerns, S. Jordan; Karplus, Martin; Kern, Dorothee (2007). "A hierarchy of timescales in protein dynamics is linked to enzyme catalysis". Nature. 450 (7171): 913–916. doi:10.1038/nature06407. ISSN 0028-0836.
- Henzler Wildman, Katherine A.; Lee, Dong-Kuk; Ramamoorthy, A. (2003-06-01). "Mechanism of Lipid Bilayer Disruption by the Human Antimicrobial Peptide, LL-37". Biochemistry. 42 (21): 6545–6558. doi:10.1021/bi0273563. ISSN 0006-2960.
- Morrison, Emma A.; DeKoster, Gregory T.; Dutta, Supratik; Vafabakhsh, Reza; Clarkson, Michael W.; Bahl, Arjun; Kern, Dorothee; Ha, Taekjip; Henzler-Wildman, Katherine A. (2012). "Antiparallel EmrE exports drugs by exchanging between asymmetric structures". Nature. 481 (7379): 45–50. doi:10.1038/nature10703. ISSN 0028-0836. PMC 3253143. PMID 22178925.
- Lewis, Adam; Kurauskas, Vilius; Tonelli, Marco; Henzler-Wildman, Katherine (2021-10-28). "Ion-dependent structure, dynamics, and allosteric coupling in a non-selective cation channel". Nature Communications. 12 (1) 6225. doi:10.1038/s41467-021-26538-8. ISSN 2041-1723. PMC 8553846. PMID 34711838.

== Awards and honors ==
Henzler-Wildman was named a Searle Scholars Program in 2010, and received the Margaret Oakley Dayhoff Award from the Biophysical Society in 2013. She was elected a fellow of the American Association for the Advancement of Science in 2024.
