= Jin Zhang (biochemist) =

Chinese-American biochemist

Jin Zhang (Chinese: 张瑾; pinyin: Zhāng Jǐn; born February 29, 1972) is a Chinese-American biochemist. She is a professor of pharmacology, chemistry and biochemistry, and biomedical engineering at the University of California, San Diego.

== Early life and education ==
Zhang was born in Beijing, China. She received her Bachelor of Science in chemistry from Tsinghua University in Beijing in 1995. She completed her PhD with David G. Lynn at the University of Chicago in 2000, and conducted postdoctoral research with Roger Y. Tsien and Susan S. Taylor at the University of California, San Diego.

== Academic career ==
Following her postdoc at UCSD, Zhang joined the faculty in the department of pharmacology and molecular sciences at the Johns Hopkins University School of Medicine in 2003. At Johns Hopkins, she was a member of the Sidney Kimmel Comprehensive Cancer Center. In 2013, she was promoted to full professor in the departments of pharmacology and molecular sciences, Solomon H. Snyder Department of Neuroscience and department of oncology, and department of chemical and biomolecular engineering.

In 2015, Zhang relocated her lab to UCSD, where she is a professor in the departments of pharmacology, bioengineering, and chemistry and biochemistry. She is a member of the Moores Cancer Center. Zhang is also director and cofounder of the Bio-Optical Probe Advancement Center at UCSD.

Zhang is an editorial board member for Cell Chemical Biology.

== Research ==
The Zhang group is interested in developing genetically encoded fluorescent protein-based biosensors for kinases, similar to those developed for calcium imaging. Genetically encoded biosensors utilize a kinase-specific substrate fused to fluorescent proteins and a phosphoamino acid binding domain, which change FRET ratio or fluorescence intensity based on kinase activity. Zhang and her lab have used this method to study several kinases, including protein kinase A, protein kinase C, and mechanistic target of rapamycin, among others. The Zhang group has also worked on super-resolution imaging techniques, including photochromic stochastic optical fluctuation imaging (pcSOFI), a variant of super-resolution optical fluctuation imaging, and fluorescence fluctuation increase by contact imaging (FLINC), which has been used to generate super-resolution kinase biosensors

Zhang, along with the help from Johns Hopkins Laboratories, is also credited for the creation of a new technique referred to as CAESAR. This technique was designed to experimentally identify substrates for unique kinases. It results in high-quality KSRs.

== Honors and awards ==
Zhang has received many honors and awards including:

- Lucent Technologies Fund, the University of Chicago (2000)
- Postdoctoral fellowship, La Jolla Interfaces in Science and Burroughs Wellcome Fund (2002-2003)
- Gordon Research Conference Young Scientist Research Award, Bioorganic Chemistry (2003)
- FAMRI Young Clinical Scientist Award, Flight Attendant Medical Research Institute (2004-2009)
- National Scientist Development Award, American Heart Association (2005-2008)
- 3M Non-tenured Faculty Award (2006–2008)
- Margaret Oakley Dayoff Award, the Biophysical Society (2009)
- NIH Director's Pioneer Award (2009–2014)
- Finalist Prize, Creative Promise in Biomedical Research, the Vilcek Foundation (2010)
- John J. Abel Award in Pharmacology, American Society for Pharmacology and Experimental Therapeutics (2012)
- Pfizer Award in Enzyme Chemistry, American Chemical Society (2012)
- Fellow of the American Association for the Advancement of Science (2014)
- NCI Outstanding Investigator Award (2015-2022)
- Journal of Histochemistry and Cytochemistry Lecture, Experimental Biology (2017)
- International Chemical Biology Society Global Lectureship (2019)
- Fellow of the American Institute for Medical and Biological Engineering (2019)
- Fellow of the American Society for Pharmacology and Experimental Therapeutics (2021)
