= Jennifer L. Ross =

American physicist

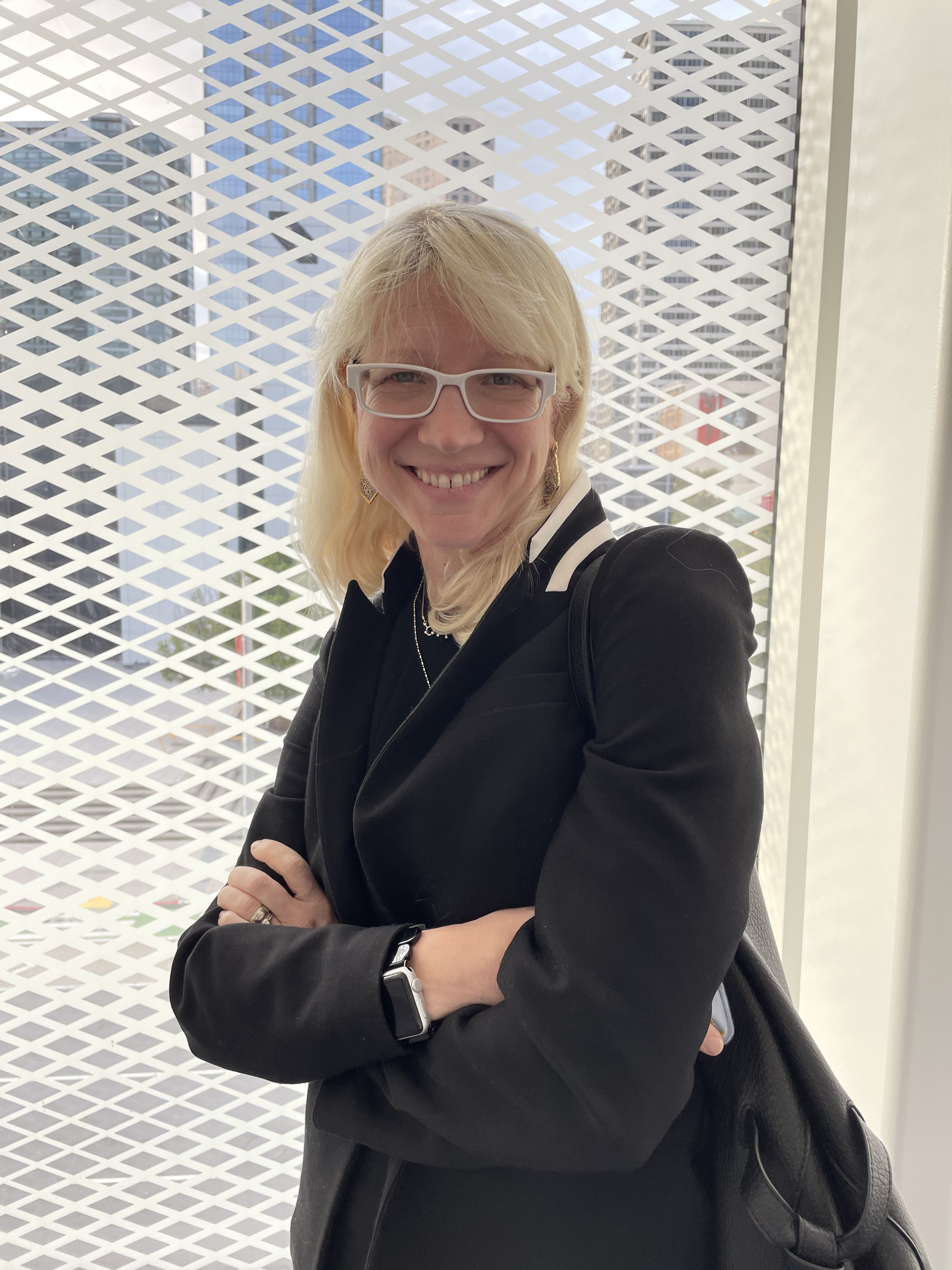
- Jenny Ross at the 2026 Biophysical Society Meeting
- Education: Wellesley College; University of California, Santa Barbara
- Awards: AAAS Fellow (2022); APS Fellow (2018)
- Scientific career
- Institutions: Syracuse University; University of Pennsylvania; University of Massachusetts Amherst
- Thesis: Biological physics studies of microtubules, taxol, and the microtubules-associated protein, tau
- Website: Ross Lab

Jennifer L. Ross is an American physicist who is a Professor in the Department of Physics at Syracuse University. She investigates active biological condensed matter physics. She was elected fellow of the American Physical Society in 2018 and to the American Association for the Advancement of Science in 2022.

== Early life and education ==
Ross became interested in science as a young person and spent her childhood playing with a chemistry set. She became interested in physics during her high school years, and eventually studied physics and mathematics at the all-women Wellesley College. She moved to the University of California, Santa Barbara for her graduate studies, where she studied microtubules and taxol. Ross was awarded an National Institutes of Health postdoctoral fellowship at the University of Pennsylvania.

== Research and career ==
In 2007, Ross joined the faculty at the University of Massachusetts Amherst. She is interested in the physical laws the determine the organization of proteins and organelles inside cells. To study the mechanisms that underpin biological processes, she developed single-molecule imaging to investigate microtubule motor proteins. These proteins are responsible for the movement of materials and organelles through bodily cells. In nerve cells, materials have to be transported over long distances, and defective transport is associated with neuromuscular disease. Ross images these proteins using a super-resolution microscope and fluorescent tagging. She also created an interdisciplinary optics course to train biologists, engineers and chemists in how design, build and use optical microscopes. Together with Margaret Gardel, Ross was awarded a National Science Foundation INSPIRE award to create phase diagrams of biological processes.

Ross investigates the processes that underpin cell division, in particular, the assembly of microtubules into mitotic spindles. The spindles serve to separate chromosomes and make sure all cells contain the same genetic information. Ross was the first to demonstrate that the shapes of the spindles can be described by the same physics that are used to describe liquid crystalline materials.

Ross has also served in leadership roles. She served as Chair of the Department of Physics at Syracuse University beginning in 2020, as Associate Dean for Creativity, Scholarship, and Research for the College of Art and Sciences, and then as Interim Dean of the School of Engineering and Computer Science, both beginning in 2025.

== Awards and honors ==
- 2005 National Institutes of Health Ruth L. Kirschstein National Research Service Award
- 2010 Research Corporation Cottrell Scholar
- 2013 Biophysical Society Margaret Oakley Dayhoff Award
- 2013 National Science Foundation INSPIRE Award
- 2014 Gordon and Betty Moore Foundation Scialog Fellow
- 2018 Elected Fellow of the American Physical Society
- 2019 University of Massachusetts Amherst Chancellor's Leadership Fellow
- 2022 Elected Fellow of the American Association for the Advancement of Science for "distinguished contributions to biophysics, particularly for experimentally elucidating regulatory mechanisms in intracellular transport."

== Selected publications ==
- Ram Dixit; Jennifer L Ross; Yale E Goldman; Erika L F Holzbaur (17 January 2008). "Differential regulation of dynein and kinesin motor proteins by tau". Science. 319 (5866): 1086–1089. Bibcode:2008Sci...319.1086D. doi:10.1126/SCIENCE.1152993. ISSN 0036-8075. PMC 2866193. PMID 18202255. Wikidata Q28589618.
- Adam G. Hendricks; Eran Perlson; Jennifer L. Ross; Harry W. Schroeder III; Mariko Tokito; Erika L.F. Holzbaur (15 April 2010). "Motor coordination via a tug-of-war mechanism drives bidirectional vesicle transport". Current Biology. 20 (8): 697–702. doi:10.1016/J.CUB.2010.02.058. ISSN 0960-9822. PMC 2908734. PMID 20399099. Wikidata Q42709942.
- Jennifer L Ross; M Yusuf Ali; David M Warshaw (15 January 2008). "Cargo transport: molecular motors navigate a complex cytoskeleton". Current Opinion in Cell Biology. 20 (1): 41–47. doi:10.1016/J.CEB.2007.11.006. ISSN 0955-0674. PMC 2688467. PMID 18226515. Wikidata Q37069629.

== Personal life ==
Ross has two children.
