= Erika Holzbaur =

American biologist

Erika L. F. Holzbaur
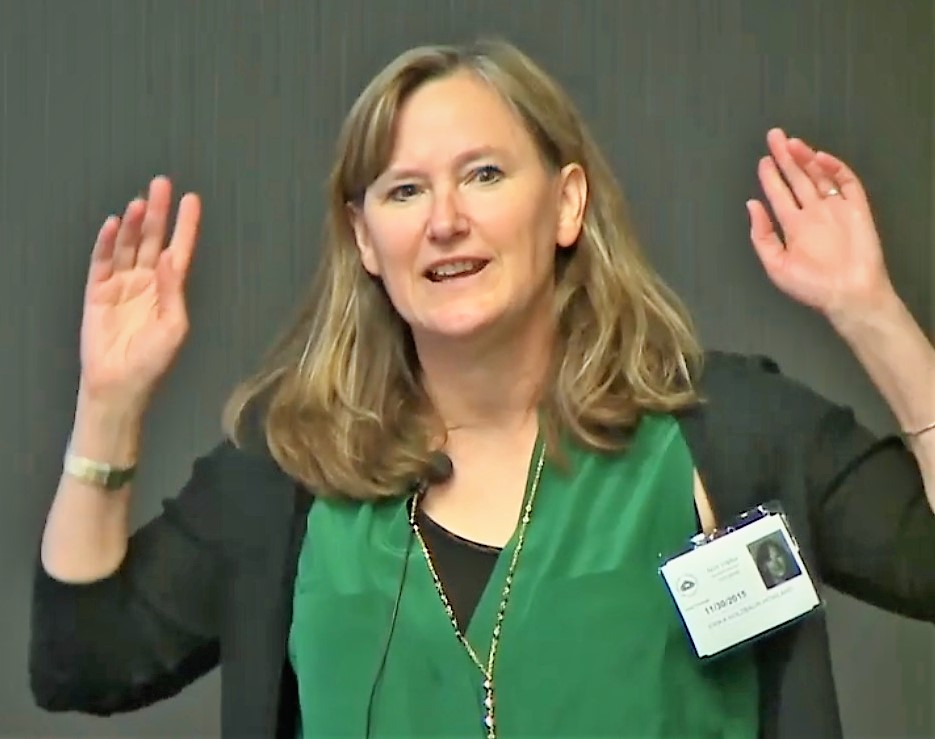
- Holzbaur speaks at the NIH Neuroscience Seminar Series in 2015
- Born: 1960 (age 65–66); Poughkeepsie, New York
- Education: Pennsylvania State University; College of William and Mary
- Scientific career
- Workplaces: University of Pennsylvania; Worcester Foundation for Biomedical Research; Pennsylvania State University
- Thesis: Kinetic and thermodynamic investigations of the microtubule-dynein ATPase pathway (1987)
- Notable students: Chantell Evans
- Website: Holzbaur Lab

Erika L F. Holzbaur (born 1960) is an American biologist who is the William Maul Measey Professor of Physiology at University of Pennsylvania Perelman School of Medicine. Her research considers the dynamics of organelle motility along cytoskeleton of cells. She is particularly interested in the molecular mechanisms that underpin neurodegenerative diseases.

== Early life and education ==
Holzbaur grew up in Poughkeepsie, New York. She became interested in American history as a teenager, and in particular was inspired by the women's rights advocate Frederick Douglass. As an undergraduate student, Holzbaur majored in history, but became fascinated by the periodic table and chemistry. She eventually graduated from the College of William & Mary with a major in chemistry and history. She completed an undergraduate research project with Melvyn Schiavelli. Holzbaur has said that she became interested in cell biology during her interviews for graduate school. Her doctoral research at Pennsylvania State University involved studies of the ATPase pathway of axonemal dynein. She worked as a postdoctoral researcher at Pennsylvania State University and the Worcester Foundation for Biomedical Research. During her postdoctoral research, Holzbaur studied cytoplasmic dynein. She was the first person to clone the p150^{Glued}, the largest subunit of the dynactin complex, and went on to show how this subunit binds to microtubules. She recognized that the cytoplasmic dynein-associated proteins closely resembled a Drosophila gene called Glued, which was known to cause neurodegeneration in the fruit-fly.

== Research and career ==
Holzbaur's research considers the dynamics of organelle motility along cytoskeleton of cells. She was appointed to the faculty at the University of Pennsylvania in 1992. Holzbaur studies various motor proteins, including dyneins, myosins and kinesins. In the axons of neurons, these motor proteins are responsible for the transport of organelles over extraordinarily long distances. She found that targeted disruption of the dynein-dynctin interaction can result in the degeneration of motor neurons. Holzbaur has used her understanding of axonal transport to better understand neurodegenerative disease, including Parkinson's disease and amyotrophic lateral sclerosis.

== Awards and honors ==
- Pfizer Award for Research Excellence
- William Maul Measey Endowed Professor
- Fellow of the American Society for Cell Biology
- Jane M. Glick Teaching Award
- National Institutes of Health Javits Neuroscience Investigator Award
- Keith R. Porter Fellowship Award
- Sandra K. Masur Senior Leadership Award
- American Heart Association Established Investigator

== Selected publications ==
- Ram Dixit; Ross, Jennifer; Goldman, Yale; Holzbaur, Erika (2008). "Differential regulation of dynein and kinesin motor proteins by tau". Science. 319 (5866): 1086–1089. Bibcode:2008Sci...319.1086D. doi:10.1126/science.1152993. PMC 2866193. PMID 18202255. Wikidata Q28589618.
- Imke Puls; Catherine Jonnakuty; Bernadette H LaMonte; et al. (2003). "Mutant dynactin in motor neuron disease". Nature Genetics. 33 (4): 455–456. doi:10.1038/ng1123. PMID 12627231. Wikidata Q52603971.
- Bernadette H LaMonte; Karen E Wallace; Beth A Holloway; et al. (2002). "Disruption of dynein/dynactin inhibits axonal transport in motor neurons causing late-onset progressive degeneration". Neuron. 34 (5): 715–727. doi:10.1016/s0896-6273(02)00696-7. PMID 12062019. Wikidata Q52546347.
