= Kalina Hristova =

Bulgarian–American engineer

- Born: Bulgaria
- Awards: Margaret Oakley Dayhoff Award

Academic background
- Education: BSc, physics, 1987, MSc, physics, 1988, Sofia University; PhD, mechanical engineering and materials science, 1994, Duke University
- Thesis: Polymer-grafted lipid systems: physical properties and applications (1994)

Kalina A. Hristova is a Bulgarian–American engineer. She is a professor of materials science and engineering at Johns Hopkins University's Whiting School of Engineering.

== Early life and education ==
Hristova received her Bachelor of Science degree and Master's degree in physics from Sofia University in 1987 and 1988, respectively, before moving to the United States. She subsequently earned her PhD in mechanical engineering and materials science from Duke University in 1994 and worked as a post-doctoral associate and research scientist at the University of California, Irvine. During college, she became fascinated by the organization of the biological membrane.

== Career ==
Upon completing her PhD, Hristova joined the faculty of the Whiting School of Engineering where she focused her research in membrane biophysics and biomolecular materials. In 2007, Hristova received the Biophysical Society’s Margaret Oakley Dayhoff Award for "her extraordinary and outstanding scientific achievements in biophysics research." As an associate professor of materials science and engineering, Hristova and her research team developed new tools and techniques that "allowed her to take pictures and make measurements that reveal how the rogue protein is behaving in the cell membrane."

In 2014, Hristova served as one of the guest editors for a special issue of Biochimica et Biophysica Acta. During the summer of 2016, Hristova and her research team developed a fluorescence-based technique that allowed membrane receptors to precisely measure receptor interactions in living cells. Later in October, she was elected a Fellow of the American Physical Society "for the development of quantitative methods to probe membrane protein interactions and to reveal the mechanism of activation of membrane receptors."

During the Western African Ebola virus epidemic, Hristova co-authored Ebola Virus Delta Peptide Is a Viroporin to describe an effort to slow the virus's spread. She began the study after suspecting that the delta peptides could weaken the protective membranes that surround cells in a patient’s gastrointestinal tract. Following this, she was elected a Fellow of the American Institute for Medical and Biological Engineering "for the development of quantitative methods revealing the mechanism of activation of membrane receptors implicated in human cancers." In 2019, Hristova received a funding award from the National Institute of General Medical Sciences for her project "Seeking the Biophysical Principles that Govern RTK Activation."
