= Gregory Petsko =

American biochemist and academic

Greg Petsko
- Born: August 7, 1948 (age 78); Washington, D.C., USA
- Education: Princeton University (BS); Merton College, Oxford (MS, PhD)
- Spouse: Laurie Glimcher
- Awards: Rhodes Scholarship
- Scientific career
- Workplaces: Harvard Medical School; Brigham and Women's Hospital; Weill Cornell Medical College; Cornell University; Brandeis University; Wayne State University School of Medicine; MIT; Max Planck Institute; University of Oxford; Princeton University
- Thesis: Structural studies of triose phosphate isomerase. (1974)
- Doctoral advisor: David Chilton Phillips
- Website: Official website

Gregory A. Petsko (born August 7, 1948) is an American biochemist who is a member of the National Academy of Sciences, the National Academy of Medicine, the American Academy of Arts and Sciences, and the American Philosophical Society. He is Professor of Neurology at the Ann Romney Center for Neurologic Diseases at Harvard Medical School and Brigham and Women's Hospital. He formerly had an endowed professorship (the Arthur J. Mahon Chair) in Neurology and Neuroscience at Weill Cornell Medical College and is an adjunct professor of Biomedical Engineering at Cornell University, and is also the Gyula and Katica Tauber Professor, emeritus, in biochemistry and chemistry at Brandeis University. On October 24, 2023, President Joe Biden presented Petsko and eight others with the National Medal of Science.

As of 2020 Petsko's research interests are understanding the biochemical bases of neurological diseases like Alzheimer's, Parkinson's, and ALS, discovering drugs (especially by using structure-based drug design) and biologics, especially gene therapy, that could therapeutically affect those biochemical targets, and seeing any resulting clinical candidates tested in humans. He has made key contributions to the fields of protein crystallography, biochemistry, biophysics, enzymology, and neuroscience.

== Education ==
Petsko was an undergraduate at Princeton University, where he graduated in 1970. He received a Rhodes Scholarship, and obtained his doctorate in Molecular Biophysics from Merton College, Oxford supervised by David Phillips, studying the structure and mechanism of the enzyme triosephosphate isomerase.

He did a brief postdoctoral fellowship in Paris with Pierre Douzou, studying enzymology at low temperatures. In 1996 he did a sabbatical at the University of California at San Francisco with Ira Herskowitz, where he learned yeast genetics and molecular biology with the support of a Guggenheim Foundation Fellowship.

== Career ==
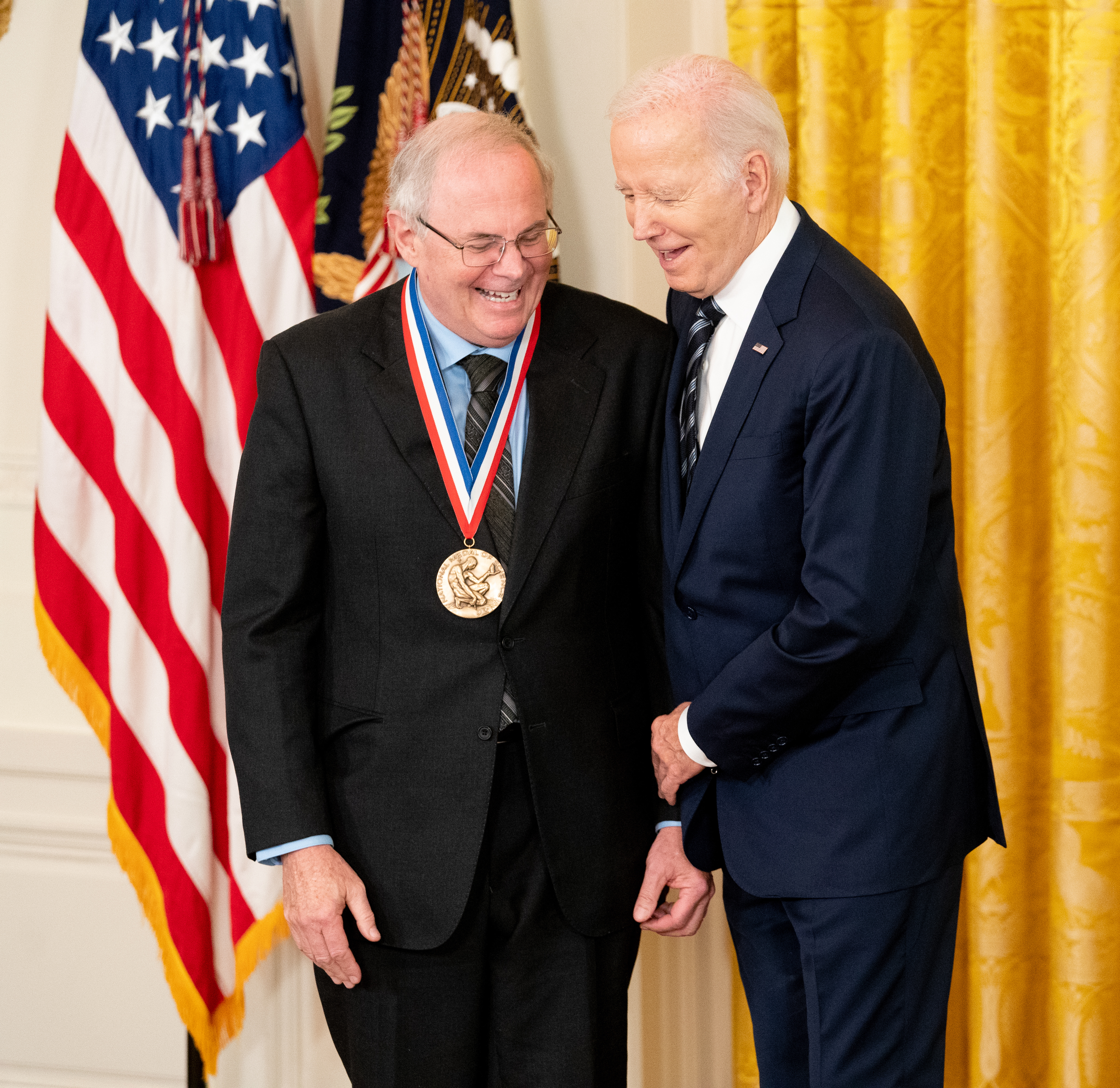
President Joe Biden awards the National Medal of Science to Petsko on October 24, 2023

Petsko's independent academic career has included stints at Wayne State University School of Medicine, the Massachusetts Institute of Technology, the Max Planck Institute for Medical Research in Heidelberg, and, from 1991 until 2012, Brandeis University, where he was Professor of Biochemistry and of Chemistry and director of the Rosenstiel Basic Medical Sciences Research Center. He is past-president of the American Society for Biochemistry and Molecular Biology and of the International Union of Biochemistry and Molecular Biology. He is an elected member of the National Academy of Sciences, the National Academy of Medicine, and the American Academy of Arts and Sciences. He is a foreign member of the Hungarian Academy of Sciences and has an honorary Doctor of Laws from Dalhousie University. In April 2010, he was elected to the American Philosophical Society. In 2012, he announced that he was moving to Weill Cornell Medical College in New York City, where his wife, the world-renowned immunologist Dr. Laurie Glimcher, had been appointed dean. He was appointed at Weill Cornell Medical College as the director of the Helen and Robert Appel Alzheimer's Disease Research Institute and the Arthur J. Mahon Professor of Neurology and Neuroscience in the Feil Family Brain and Mind Research Institute, and at Cornell University as adjunct professor of Biomedical Engineering, and retained an appointment at Brandeis University as Gyula and Katica Tauber Professor of Biochemistry and Chemistry, emeritus. His wife was named president and CEO of the Dana–Farber Cancer Institute in October 2016, and in January 2019 he followed her back to Boston, assuming his present position as Professor of Neurology at the Ann Romney Center for Neurologic Diseases at Brigham and Women's Hospital and Harvard Medical School. On October 24, 2023, he and eight other scientists received the National Medal of Science from President Joe Biden. The National Medal of Science is the highest honor the United States can confer on a scientist; since the first was awarded in 1963 by President John F. Kennedy, only 506 individuals have received it.

== Research ==
Petsko's current research interests are understanding the biochemical bases of neurological diseases like Alzheimer's, Parkinson's, and ALS, discovering drugs (especially by using structure-based drug design) that could therapeutically affect those biochemical targets, and seeing any resulting drug and gene therapy candidates tested in humans.

Petsko's past research interests have been in protein crystallography and enzymology. He is co-author with Dagmar Ringe of Protein Structure and Function. He was also the author of a monthly column in Genome Biology modelled after an amusing column in Current Biology penned by Sydney Brenner. The first ten years of that column are available as an eBook.

Petsko is best known for his collaborative work with Dagmar Ringe, in which they used X-ray crystallography to solve important problems in protein function including protein dynamics as a function of temperature and problems in mechanistic enzymology, and for his collaborative work with Dr. Scott Small of Columbia University, which focuses on the retromer endosomal protein trafficking pathway and its role in Alzheimer's and Parkinson's diseases.

At MIT and Brandeis, he and Dagmar Ringe trained a large number of current leaders in structural molecular biology who now have leadership roles in science. These individuals include John Kuriyan and Ilme Schlichting.
