= Lynne Regan =

Chemist

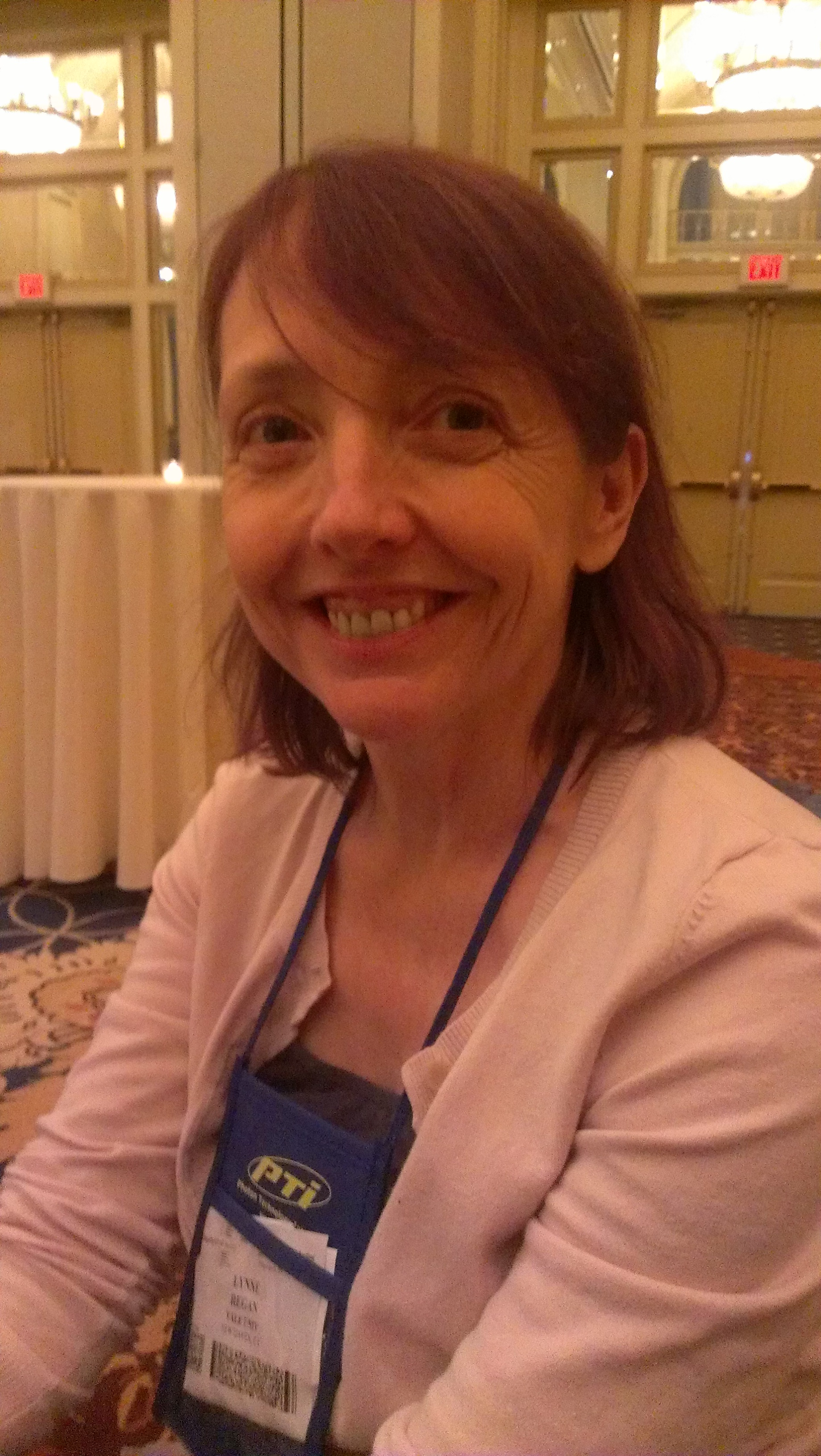
- Lynne Regan at the Biophysical Society meeting, February 2013
- Citizenship: United Kingdom
- Education: University of Oxford
- Awards: Margaret Oakley Dayhoff Award (1995/6); Guggenheim Fellow (2005)
- Scientific career
- Fields: Biochemistry, biotechnology
- Workplaces: Yale University (2000-2018), University of Edinburgh (2018 onwards)
- Thesis: (1987)
- Doctoral advisor: Paul Schimmel
- Website: regan.bio.ed.ac.uk

Lynne Regan is a Professor of Biochemistry and Biotechnology at the School of Biological Sciences at the University of Edinburgh. Previously, she was a Professor of Molecular Biophysics and Biochemistry at Yale University. She was the president of the Protein Society for the 2013–2014 term and has earned many awards throughout her career. Her research mainly concerns interactions between proteins and nucleic acids.

== Education ==
In 1981, Regan graduated with a bachelor's degree in biochemistry from University of Oxford. She was awarded the Gibbs prize for the top first class honor of her year and obtained a distinction in Clinical Pharmacology. She went on to study at the Massachusetts Institute of Technology under Paul Schimmel with a Fulbright Scholarship, and earned her PhD there in 1987.

== Career and research ==
Regan began her career as a professor with an assistant position in Yale's Department of Molecular Biophysics and Biochemistry in 2000; she became a full professor in 1998. In 2000, she became a professor in the Department of Chemistry. The National Institute of Health awarded her a 2-year Shannon Grant in 1992 for work on small model proteins. From 1992 to 1997, Regan was also a National Young Investigator for the National Science Foundation; she used the E. coli protein Rop to research interactions between alpha helices as well as RNA recognition of the protein and its connecting loops. Her studies of newly synthesized anti-cancer compounds led to a one-year Guggenheim Fellowship in 2005. In 2008, she became the first director of Yale's Raymond and Beverly Sackler Institute for Biological, Physical and Engineering Sciences.

== Honors ==
The Biophysical Society awarded Regan the Margaret Oakley Dayhoff Award for 1995–1996, an award established in 1984 and given to women early in their careers who have made significant contributions to biophysics. In 2009, Regan was elected to the Connecticut Academy of Science and Engineering. Regan was elected the president of the Protein Society for the 2013–2014 term.
