= Margaret Gardel =

American biophysicist

Academic background
- Education: Sc.B., Brown University; PhD., 2004, Harvard University
- Thesis: Elasticity of F-actin networks (2004)
- Doctoral advisor: David A. Weitz

Academic work
- Institutions: University of Chicago

Margaret Lise Gardel is an American biophysicist. She is the Horace B. Horton Professor in the Department of Physics at the University of Chicago. She serves as the Lead Editor of PRX Life, a journal published by the American Physical Society focused on the physics of living systems.

== Education ==
After Gardel earned her bachelor’s degree in physics and mathematics from Brown University, she was accepted into physics graduate programs at Harvard University. While completing her PhD, she became interested in the ways actin deforms in response to external mechanical stress. She was encouraged by Clare Waterman and various cell biologists to leave her postdoc position and join a research team at Scripps Research Institute.

She was later accepted as a Pappalardo Fellow at the Massachusetts Institute of Technology to conduct independent research in the areas of biophysics.

== Career ==
Gardel joined the Department of Physics faculty at the University of Chicago in 2007, after completing her post-doctoral work. Shortly after she began teaching, Gardel received a Director’s Pioneer Award from the National Institutes of Health. The next year, Gardel was part of a research program examining "the sudden and dramatic transformations that occur in processes where small-scale structural rearrangements result in rapid and far-reaching outcomes." She was also awarded a Sloan research fellowships.

By 2012, Gardel was the recipient of the 2012 Early Excellence Award from the American Asthma Foundation. The following year, Gardel and Jennifer Ross, a professor at the University of Massachusetts Amherst, received a four-year, $800,000 INSPIRE grant from the National Science Foundation to study the fundamental physical laws that govern the behavior of cellular materials.

In 2018, Gardel was appointed the Horace B. Horton Professor in the Department of Physics and the College. During that academic year, Gardel was part of a research study that recreated cell division outside of a cell.

== Selected Honors and Awards ==
- 2007 NIH Director's Pioneer Award
- 2008 Sloan Fellowship
- 2008 Packard Fellowship
- 2013 Fellow, American Physical Society
- 2020 Raymond and Beverly Sackler International Prize in Biophysics
- 2025 National Academy of Sciences
