= Stephen K. Burley =

American scientist

- Born: November 13, 1957 (age 68)
- Education: University of Western Ontario (BS); Exeter College, Oxford (MS, PhD); Harvard University (MD)
- Scientific career
- Workplaces: Rutgers University; Lilly Research Laboratories; Rockefeller University; Howard Hughes Medical Institute
- Thesis: Molecular arrangement in viruses studied by X-ray and neutron scattering and other physical techniques (1983)
- Doctoral advisor: Andrew Miller

Stephen Kevin Burley is a British-born scientist, naturalized in both Canada and the United States. He is known as an expert in structural biology, proteomics, structure/fragment based drug discovery, and clinical medicine/oncology.

He joined Rutgers, The State University of New Jersey in 2013, where he is a University Professor and Henry Rutgers Chair. Burley directs the RCSB Protein Data Bank (a member of the Worldwide Protein Data Bank), the Institute for Quantitative Biomedicine, and the Rutgers Artificial Intelligence and Data Science (RAD) Collaboratory.

Burley has over 360 publications and more than 1,200 experimental protein structures available in the Protein Data Bank archive.

== Education and Career ==
Following undergraduate training in physics and mathematics at the University of Western Ontario, Burley received an M.D. degree from Harvard Medical School in the joint Harvard-MIT Health Sciences and Technology Program and, as a Rhodes scholar, received a D.Phil in Structural Biology from Oxford University. He trained in internal medicine at the Brigham and Women's Hospital in Boston, and carried out post-doctoral research with Gregory A. Petsko and Nobel Laureate William N. Lipscomb at MIT and Harvard, respectively.

He joined the faculty at The Rockefeller University in 1990, and became an Investigator in the Howard Hughes Medical Institute (1994-2002) and the Richard M. and Isabel P. Furlaud Professor (1997-2002). During time on the Rockefeller faculty, he also served as Founding Director of the Pels Family Center, Chair of the Academic Senate, and Deputy for Academic Affairs reporting directly to the President of the University.

With William J. Rutter, Nobel Laureate David Baker, and others at the University of California at San Francisco and Rockefeller, Burley co-founded Prospect Genomics, Inc. In 2002, he resigned his roles at Rockefeller and the Howard Hughes Medical Institute to become the Chief Scientific Officer and Senior Vice-President of SGX Pharmaceuticals, Inc. after it acquired Prospect Genomics. Following a 2006 Initial Public Offering on the NASDAQ and multiple filings of Investigational New Drug Applications, SGX was acquired by Eli Lilly and Company where Burley was a Distinguished Lilly Research Scholar in Lilly Research Laboratories (2008-2012).

In 2013, Burley joined Rutgers, The State University of New Jersey as Director of the Center for Integrative Proteomics Research and became director of the RCSB PDB (US regional data center for the worldwide PDB) in 2014, succeeding Prof. Helen Berman.

== Research ==
Burley made significant contributions to our understanding of gene transcription in eukaryotes, including three-dimensional (3D) structures of the TATA Box-binding Protein, transcription factor IIb, the Myc oncoprotein, and Hepatocyte Nuclear Factor 3 gamma, all bound to promoter DNA. He also carried out structural studies of eukaryotic proteins that control initiation of messenger RNA (mRNA) translation in eukaryotes, including eIF4E bound to an mRNA cap and the poly-A binding protein bound the 3’ end of an mRNA.

While working in industry, Burley was chief scientific officer, and senior vice-president for research at SGX Pharmaceuticals, Inc., where he and his colleagues built an industry-leading high-throughput platform for structure-guided drug discovery, and crystallographic screening of fragments of drug-like molecules bound to target proteins. These same tools are now used by pharmaceutical companies worldwide.

At SGX and Lilly, he and his colleagues determined thousands of proprietary structures, most of which remain inside the company firewall. In 2003 under Burley’s leadership, SGX deposited into the PDB the first 3D atomic-level structure of a SARS-CoV-1 viral protein (its main protease, a key drug target). This work set the stage for structure-guided discovery of nirmatrelvir (active ingredient of Paxlovid) by Pfizer.

Burley has studied the role of the PDB archive in facilitating discovery and early stage development of nearly 90% of the new drugs approved recently by the US Food and Drug Administration 2010-2016. More than 70% of the 54 new small-molecule anti-neoplastic agents approved 2010-2018 were the product of the structure-guided drug discovery campaigns, which relied on open access to PDB structures of the target proteins of these new drugs. The same proved true for >80% of the 34 new small-molecule anti-cancer drugs approved 2019-2023.

Burley also has been involved with efforts involving 3D biostructure data representation (e.g., IHM, Computed Structure Models and validation).

== Honors and awards ==
- NJEdge, Inc. Edge 2024 Research Impact Award for Pioneering Work in Structural Biology: Transformative Contributions to Biomedical Research and Global Scientific Collaboration
- Fellow of the Royal Society of Canada
- Fellow of the New York Academy of Sciences
- Fellow of the American Crystallographic Association
- Fellow of The Protein Society
- 2027 M.J. Buerger Award from the American Crystallographic Association
- Doctor of Science (Honoris causa) from his alma mater the University of Western Ontario (now Western University)
- Rhodes Scholar
