= Susan Marqusee =

American biophysicist

- Education: Cornell University, Stanford University
- Awards: Beckman Young Investigators Award,
- Scientific career
- Fields: Biochemistry
- Workplaces: University of California, Berkeley

Susan Marqusee is the Eveland Warren Endowed Chair Professor of Biochemistry, Biophysics, and Structural Biology at the University of California, Berkeley and a Chan Zuckerberg Biohub investigator. Her research concerns the structure and dynamics of protein molecules. She received her A.B. in Physics and Chemistry from Cornell University in 1982, and her Ph.D. (Biochemistry) and M.D. degrees from Stanford University in 1990, where she trained with Robert Baldwin on the intrinsic helical properties of amino acids in model peptides.

She was one of the 1995 winners of the Beckman Young Investigators Award, the 1996–1997 winner of the Margaret Oakley Dayhoff Award, and the 2012 winner of the William C. Rose Award. Marqusee also received the Dorothy Crowfoot Hodgkin Award from The Protein Society. She was made a Fellow of the American Society for Biochemistry and Molecular Biology (ASBMB) In 2023 for service to the society and contributions to the molecular life sciences.

In 2016 she was elected to the National Academy of Sciences. Her recent research concerns protein energetics, folding and turnover as altered by protein ubiquitylation.

As of June 2023, she is serving as an assistant director at the National Science Foundation, leading the Directorate for Biological Sciences.

== Selected Publications ==
- "X-ray footprinting/mass spectrometry provides a new, detailed view of intrinsically disordered protein structural ensembles" D Kahan, S Gupta, A Udupa, S Bjarnason, P Heidarsson, M V. Staller, C Ralston, S Marqusee. Biophysical Journal (2026).
- "Investigating disorder-containing complexes using hydrogen-deuterium exchange with mass spectrometry" J Morse, D Kahan, S Shoemaker, S Marqusee. Protein Science (2025).
- "NUB1 traps unfolded FAT10 for ubiquitin-independent degradation by the 26S proteasome" C Arkinson, K C. Dong, C L. Gee, S M. Costello, A C. Soe, G L. Hura, S Marquesee, A Martin. Nature Structural & Molecular Biology (2025).
