= John Kuriyan =

American biochemist

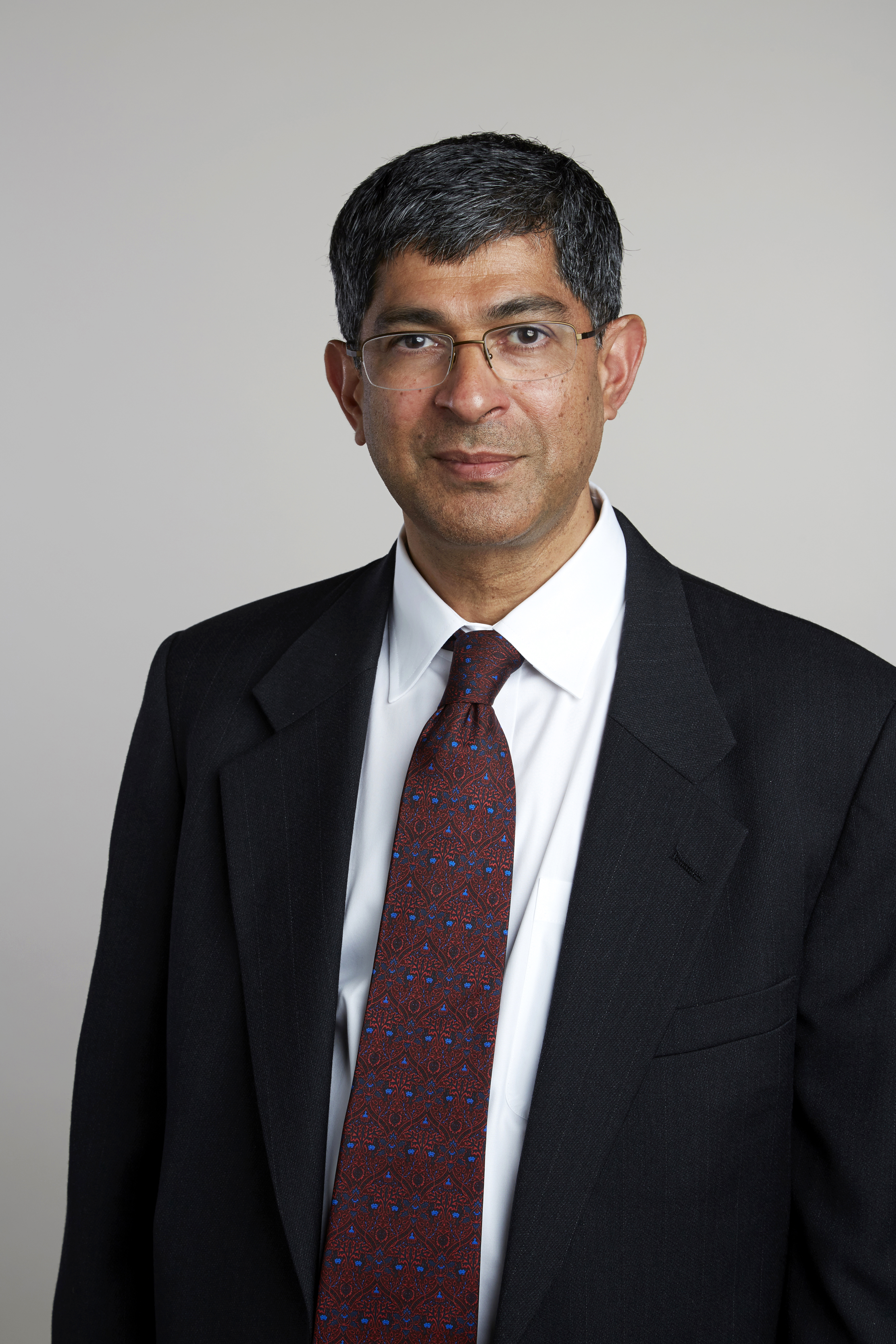
- Kuriyan in 2015
- Education: Juniata College (BS); Massachusetts Institute of Technology (PhD)
- Known for: Structure and regulation of protein kinases; signal transduction; DNA replication
- Awards: Member of the National Academy of Sciences (2001); Richard Lounsbery Award (2005); Foreign Member of the Royal Society (2015); Member of the National Academy of Medicine (2018)
- Scientific career
- Fields: Biochemistry, structural biology
- Workplaces: Vanderbilt University School of Medicine; University of California, Berkeley; Rockefeller University
- Thesis: The structure and flexibility of myoglobin: molecular dynamics and x-ray crystallography (1986)
- Doctoral advisor: Gregory Petsko; Martin Karplus

John Kuriyan is an American structural biologist and biochemist. He is the dean of basic sciences and a professor of biochemistry at Vanderbilt University School of Medicine. He was previously a professor at the University of California, Berkeley and an investigator of the Howard Hughes Medical Institute. He was elected to the National Academy of Sciences in 2001 and to the National Academy of Medicine in 2018.

== Education ==
Kuriyan received his B.S. in chemistry from Juniata College in Pennsylvania, followed by his Ph.D. in physical chemistry at the Massachusetts Institute of Technology supervised by Gregory Petsko and Martin Karplus.

== Research and career ==
Kuriyan did postdoctoral research for one year with Martin Karplus at Harvard University before becoming an assistant professor at Rockefeller University. Kuriyan's laboratory studies the structure and mechanism of enzymes and other proteins involved in cellular signal transduction and DNA replication.

Kuriyan's research has focused on the structural basis of protein kinase regulation and signaling, including mechanisms of activation and inhibition in tyrosine kinases. This is based in part on the use X-ray crystallography. His work has also contributed to methodological advances in macromolecular structure determination, including the use of molecular dynamics in crystallographic refinement.

== Awards and honors ==
In 1989, Kuriyan was named a Pew Scholar. He received the Schering-Plough Award of the American Society for Biochemistry and Molecular Biology (1994), the Dupont–Merck Award of the Protein Society (1997), the Eli Lilly Award in Biological Chemistry of the American Chemical Society (1998), and the Cornelius Rhoads Memorial Award from the American Association for Cancer Research (1999). He was awarded the Richard Lounsbery Award of the National Academy of Sciences in 2005. In 2009 he received the ASBMB Merck Award for his contributions to structural biology. Kuriyan was elected a Foreign Member of the Royal Society in 2015. He was elected to the National Academy of Medicine in 2018.

== Selected publications ==
- Kuriyan, John; Konforti, Boyana; Wemmer, David (2012). The Molecules of Life: Physical and Chemical Principles. Garland Science. ISBN 978-0-8153-4188-8.
- Brünger, Axel T.; Kuriyan, John; Karplus, Martin (1987). "Crystallographic R factor refinement by molecular dynamics". Science. 235 (4787): 458–460. doi:10.1126/science.235.4787.458. PMID 17810339.
- Schindler, T.; Bornmann, W.; Pellicena, P.; Miller, W. T.; Clarkson, B.; Kuriyan, J. (2000). "Structural mechanism for STI-571 inhibition of abelson tyrosine kinase". Science. 289 (5486): 1938–1942. doi:10.1126/science.289.5486.1938. PMID 10988075.
- Zhang, Xuewu; Gureasko, Jodi; Shen, Kui; Cole, Philip A.; Kuriyan, John (2006). "An allosteric mechanism for activation of the kinase domain of epidermal growth factor receptor". Cell. 125 (6): 1137–1149. doi:10.1016/j.cell.2006.05.013. PMID 16777603.
