= Neurobiology of Disease =

Peer-reviewed medical journal

- Discipline: Neuroscience
- Language: English
- Edited by: Dr. Erwan Bezard

Publication details
- History: 1994-present
- Publisher: Elsevier
- Frequency: Monthly
- Impact factor: 5.227 (2017)

Standard abbreviations
- ISO 4: Neurobiol. Dis.

Indexing
- CODEN: NUDIEM
- ISSN: 0969-9961
- OCLC no.: 848190540

Links
- Journal homepage; Online access

Neurobiology of Disease is a monthly peer-reviewed scientific journal covering research on disease mechanisms underlying disorders of the nervous system and behavior. It was established in 1994 and is published by Elsevier. The founding editors-in-chief were Dennis Choi and Jacques Mallet. The current editor-in-chief is Dr. Erwan Bezard, who is an Inserm research director at Bordeaux Neurocampus, University of Bordeaux, France.

== Abstracting and indexing ==
The journal is abstracted and indexed in Scopus, Science Citation Index, Current Contents/Life Sciences, and BIOSIS Previews. According to the Journal Citation Reports, the journal has a 2012 impact factor of 5.624.
