= Jonathon Nixon-Abell =

British neuroscientist and cell biologist

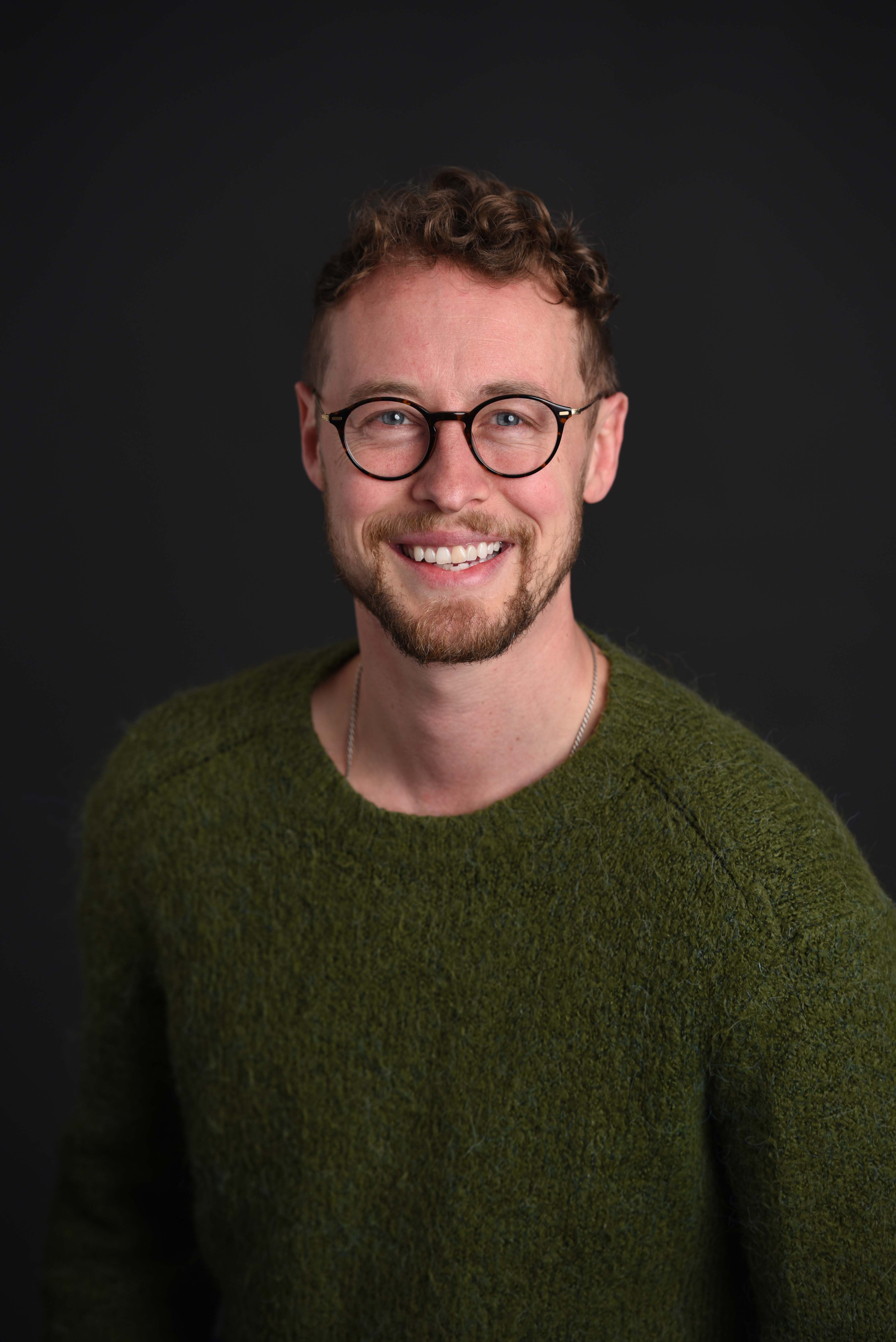
Dr. Jonathon Nixon-Abell

Jonathon Nixon-Abell (born 1988) is a British neuroscientist and cell biologist whose research focuses on the organization and dynamics of intracellular organelles, particularly in neurons. He is a group leader and Wellcome Trust Fellow in Clinical Neurosciences at the Cambridge Institute for Medical Research, at the University of Cambridge.

== Education and career ==
Nixon-Abell received his BSc in Neuroscience from University College London. He completed his PhD in Molecular Neuroscience through a joint programme between University College London and the U.S. National Institutes of Health, where his doctoral research examined endoplasmic reticulum structure and function. He subsequently undertook postdoctoral research at the Howard Hughes Medical Institute's Janelia Research Campus and the University of Cambridge as a Sir Henry Wellcome Fellow, working on advanced imaging approaches to study endoplasmic reticulum dynamics and organelle interactions. In 2024, Nixon-Abell was awarded a Wellcome Trust Career Development Award, under which he established his independent research group at the University of Cambridge.

== Research ==
Nixon-Abell's research focuses on understanding how intracellular organelles are shaped, trafficked and communicate with one another, and how these processes contribute to cellular homeostasis and disease. Nixon-Abell has also contributed to the Encyclopaedia of Cell Biology, and published an opinion piece in the Financial Times discussing the importance of diversity and interdisciplinary approaches in the development of COVID-19 vaccines.
