= Erik Zuiderweg =

American biochemist (born 1950)

Erik R. P. Zuiderweg
- Born: 1950 (age 75–76)

Academic work
- Discipline: Biochemistry
- Institutions: University of Michigan

Erik R. P. Zuiderweg (born February 28 or March 28, 1950) is an American biochemist, currently at University of Michigan and an Elected Fellow of the American Association for the Advancement of Science.
