= Edwin Nesbit Chapman =

American physician

Edwin Nesbit Chapman (February 26, 1819 – March 2, 1888) was an American medical doctor and writer of Hysterology: A Treatise, Descriptive and Clinical (1872). At the time of his death, he was one of the oldest medical doctors in Brooklyn, New York.

== Early life and education ==
Chapman, elder son of Col. Phineas and Betsey (Abbot) Chapman, of Ridgefield, Conn., was born in that town, February 26, 1819. He graduated from Yale College in 1842 and from Jefferson Medical College with the degree of M.D. in 1845.

== Career ==
After receiving his medical degree, Chapman settled immediately in Brooklyn, where he continued in practice until the failure of his health some two years before his death.

When the Long Island College Hospital was chartered in 1858, he was elected to the medical staff, and upon the organization of a teaching department in 1859, he was appointed Professor of Therapeutics and Materia Medica, and also soon after of Clinical Midwifery.

Four years later he was elected to the chair of Obstetrics and the Diseases of Women and Children, to which subjects he had latterly given in his practice special attention; and this position he held with distinction until his resignation in 1868.

He published in 1872 an elaborate Treatise on the Diseases and Displacements of the Uterus (8vo., pp. xiv, 504), and also made voluminous contributions to medical periodicals.

== Personal life and death ==
He died of paralysis, in Brooklyn, March 2, 1888, at the age of 69.

He was married, March 19, 1846, to Mary A. Read, adopted daughter of George F. H. Read, of New Haven, by whom he had one daughter, who survived him, besides two children who died in infancy. His wife having died in 1856, he was married in 1865 to Maria B., daughter of John Davol, of Brooklyn, who survived him with their four sons.
