= Protein Society =

Scholastic society for the study of proteins

The Protein Society
- Formation: 1985
- Type: Learned society
- Purpose: To advance state-of-the-art science through international forums that promote communication, cooperation, and collaboration among scientists involved in the study of proteins.
- Members: ~1,100 (2023)
- President: Elizabeth Meiering
- Website: www.proteinsociety.org

The Protein Society is an international, not-for-profit, scholarly society with the mission to provide forums for the advancement of research into protein structure, function, design and applications.

== History ==
The Protein Society was founded in 1986, with the leadership of Ralph Bradshaw, Finn Wold, David Eisenberg, Ken Walsh, Hans Neurath, and other protein researchers from diverse fields.

Ralph Bradshaw was the society's first president, followed by David Eisenberg, Finn Wold, Mark Hermodson, Joseph Villafranca, Brian Matthews, Robert Sauer, Christopher Dobson, Wiliam DeGrado, C. Robert Matthews, Jeffery Kelly, Arthur Palmer, Daniel Raleigh, Lynne Regan, James U. Bowie, Carol Post, Charles L. Brooks III, Amy E. Keating, Charles R. Sanders, Elizabeth Meiering

== Journal ==
In 1987, the Society began publishing the trans-disciplinary academic journal Protein Science, with Hans Neurath serving as editor-in-chief. The journal covers research on the structure, function, and biochemical significance of proteins, their role in molecular and cell biology, genetics, and evolution, and their regulation and mechanisms of action. As of 2024, the editor-in-chief is John Kuriyan.

== Symposium ==
The society organizes an annual symposium which hosts hundreds of participants from all over the world, features research presentations by leaders from the diverse fields involved in protein science, a graduate student poster competition, networking opportunities, free undergraduate registration, educational workshops, and the annual presentation of the Protein Society's Awards.

== Awards ==
The Protein Society presents eight awards each year:

- Carl Brändén Award
- Christian B. Anfinsen Award
- Dorothy Crowfoot Hodgkin Award
- Emil Thomas Kaiser Award
- Hans Neurath Award
- Stein & Moore Award
- Protein Science Young Investigator Award
- Marie Daly Award
