= Charles F. Stevens =

American neurobiologist (1934–2022)

Charles F. "Chuck" Stevens
- Born: September 2, 1934; Chicago, Illinois, U.S.
- Died: October 21, 2022 (aged 88); San Diego, California, U.S.
- Education: Harvard University, Yale University, Rockefeller University
- Awards: W. Alden Spencer Award (1979); Karl Spencer Lashley Award (2000)
- Scientific career
- Fields: Neuroscience
- Workplaces: Salk Institute, Santa Fe Institute
- Doctoral advisor: Haldan Keffer Hartline
- Notable students: Erwin Neher

Notes
- | spouse =

Charles F. "Chuck" Stevens (September 1, 1934 – October 21, 2022) was an American neurobiologist at the Salk Institute in La Jolla. He was the Vincent J. Coates Professor at the Salk Institute for Biological Studies and adjunct professor of pharmacology and neuroscience at UCSD's School of Medicine. He was also an external professor and member of the science board at the Santa Fe Institute and a general member of the Aspen Center for Physics.

== Major contributions ==
He made several seminal discoveries regarding the molecular basis of synaptic transmission. In 2002, together with Dmitri Chklovskii, Stevens described the "3/5 Power Scaling law of neural circuits."

Stevens and Anderson used noise analysis to infer the conductance of single acetylcholine ion channels. This work paved the way for Nobel laureate Erwin Neher's patch clamping techniques. Neher was a postdoctoral associate with Stevens at the University of Washington and then Yale University.

== Education ==
Stevens has a B.A. in psychology from Harvard University, where he began his education hoping to be a physician. He then received an M.D. degree at Yale University, and a Ph.D. in biophysics from Rockefeller University with Haldan Keffer Hartline. He was a member of the faculties at the University of Washington Medical School and at Yale Medical School before joining the Salk Institute.

Stevens was elected member to the National Academy of Sciences in 1982, and he was formerly an investigator of the Howard Hughes Medical Institute. He was elected a Fellow of the American Academy of Arts and Sciences in 1984. In 2000 he was awarded the NAS Award for Scientific Reviewing from the National Academy of Sciences.
