= Charles R. Sanders =

Professor of biochemistry and medicine

Charles R. Sanders is an American biophysical chemist. He is Professor of Biochemistry and Medicine at Vanderbilt University School of Medicine, where he holds the Aileen M. Lange and Annie Mary Lyle Chair in Cardiovascular Research. He also serves as Senior Advisor to the Dean of Basic Sciences. His research focuses on membrane protein structure and function, protein folding and misfolding, membrane biophysics, and nuclear magnetic resonance (NMR) spectroscopy. His research focuses on membrane protein structure and function, protein folding and misfolding, membrane biophysics, and NMR spectroscopy. Sanders is known for contributions to membrane protein biophysics, including the development of bicelle membrane systems used for structural studies of membrane proteins.

== Early life and education ==
Sanders earned his bachelor's degrees in chemistry and mathematics from Milligan University. He received a Ph.D. in chemistry from Ohio State University, where he studied under Ming-Daw Tsai. He subsequently completed postdoctoral research in NMR spectroscopy with James Prestegard at Yale University.

== Career ==
Before joining Vanderbilt University, Sanders served on the faculty of Case Western Reserve University School of Medicine, where he established an independent research program in membrane protein biophysics. In 2002, he joined the Vanderbilt University faculty as Professor of Biochemistry and has a secondary appointment in the Department of Medicine. He has served in several academic leadership positions within Vanderbilt University School of Medicine, including Associate Dean for Research in Basic Sciences, Vice Dean for Basic Sciences, and Senior Advisor to the Dean of Basic Sciences. Sanders is affiliated with the Vanderbilt Center for Structural Biology and the Vanderbilt Institute of Chemical Biology, where his laboratory studies the molecular mechanisms underlying membrane protein folding, stability, and disease.

== Research ==
Sanders' research examines the structure, dynamics, and folding of membrane proteins using biochemical, biophysical, and structural biology approaches. As part of his research on Charcot–Marie–Tooth disease, Sanders has led studies investigating PMP22, a membrane protein whose altered expression is a major cause of CMT1A. His laboratory identified candidate small molecules that modulate PMP22 production or cell-surface trafficking as potential therapeutic leads for the disease.

His laboratory also investigates other disease-related membrane proteins, including PERP (p53 apoptosis effector related to PMP22) and proteins involved in neurodegeneration, cardiovascular disease, and other disorders. These studies combine structural biology, spectroscopy, biochemical analysis, cellular approaches, and high-throughput screening to identify potential therapeutic strategies. In addition to experimental studies of membrane proteins, Sanders has authored review articles on membrane protein folding, proteostasis, and membrane protein biophysics.

== Honors and awards ==
- 2012 – Award in Membrane Protein Biophysics, Biophysical Society
- 2013 – Hans Neurath Award, The Protein Society
- 2021–2023 – Served as President of The Protein Society.

== Selected publications ==
- Sanders CR, Schwonek JP. Biochemistry (1992). "Characterization of Magnetically Orientable Bilayers in Mixtures of DHPC and DMPC by Solid State NMR."
- Barrett PJ, Song Y, Van Horn WD, et al. Science (2012). "The Amyloid Precursor Protein Has a Flexible Transmembrane Domain and Binds Cholesterol."
- Marinko JT, Huang H, Penn WD, et al. Chemical Reviews (2019). "Folding and Misfolding of Human Membrane Proteins in Health and Disease."
- Hutchison JM, Shih KC, Scheidt HA, et al. Journal of the American Chemical Society (2020). "Bicelles Rich in Both Sphingolipids and Cholesterol."
- Katherine M. Stefanski^{ǂ}, Geoffrey C. Li^{ǂ}, Justin T. Marinko, Bruce D. Carter, David C. Samuels*, and Charles R. Sanders* Journal of Biological Chemistry (2022). How T118M peripheral myelin protein 22 predisposes humans to Charcot-Marie-Tooth disease .
- Sanders CR, Carter CB, Wilkinson MC, Li GC, Stefanski KN. Chemical Reviews (2026). "Peripheral Myelin Protein-22 and Its Prominence in Charcot-Marie-Tooth Disease."
