= Sarah L. Keller =

American biophysicist

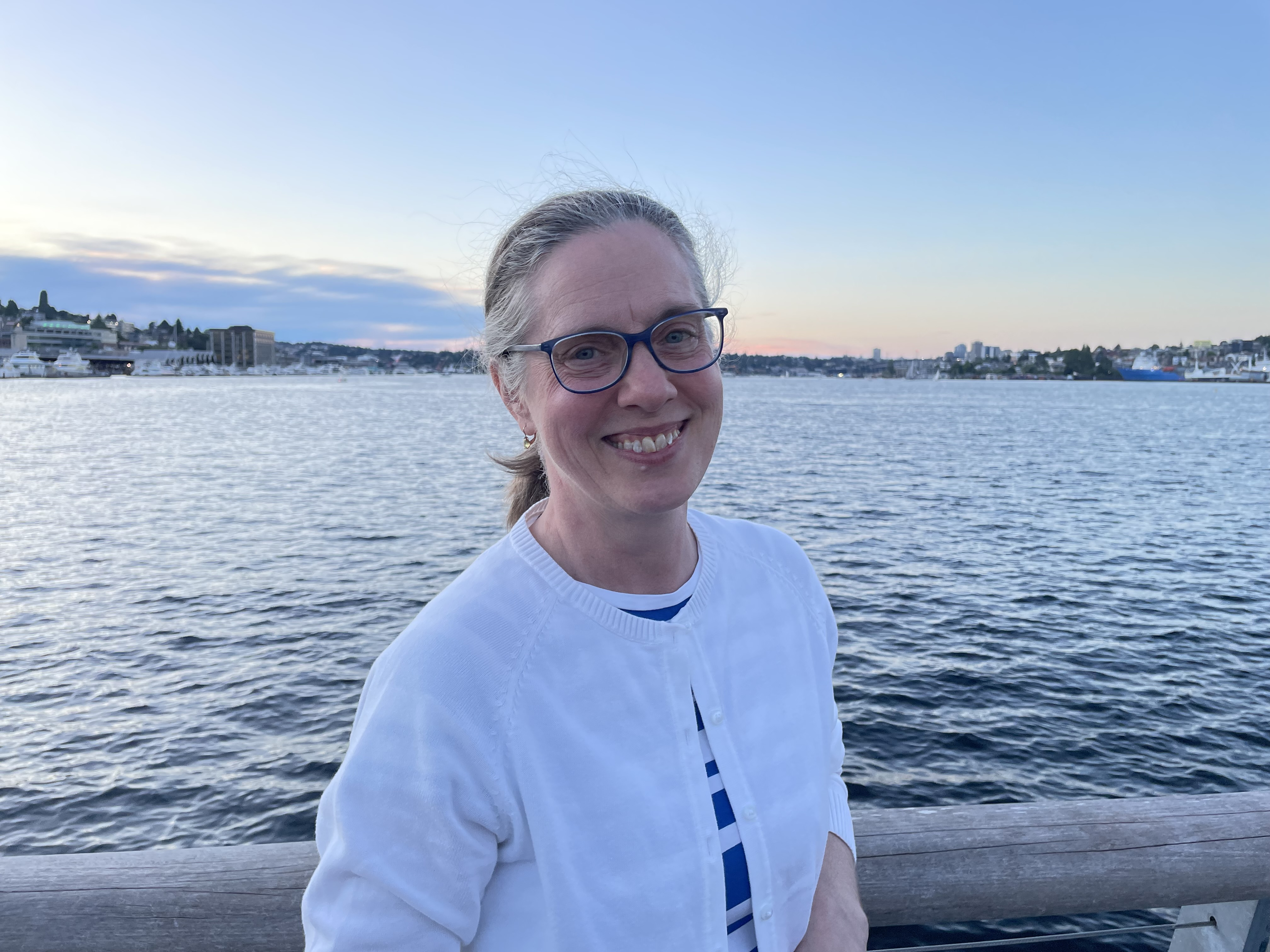
- Education: Rice University, Princeton University
- Awards: Thomas E. Thompson Award (2014); Avanti Award in Lipids (Biophysical Society, 2017)
- Scientific career
- Fields: Biophysics
- Workplaces: University of Washington
- Doctoral advisor: Sol M. Gruner

Sarah L. Keller is an American biophysicist, studying problems at the intersection between biology and chemistry. She investigates self-assembling soft matter systems. Her current main research focus is understanding how simple lipid mixtures within bilayer membranes give rise to membrane's complex phase behavior.

Keller is a fellow of the American Physical Society (APS) (2011) and the American Association for the Advancement of Science (AAAS) (2013) and has won multiple awards including the Thomas E. Thompson Award (2014) and the Avanti Award in Lipids (Biophysical Society, 2017). She is a professor of chemistry and adjunct professor of physics at the University of Washington, Seattle, WA.

== Early life and education ==
Keller studied her undergraduate degree at Rice University and gained her Ph.D. degree in physics at Princeton University in 1995. Her graduate study was on the "interaction between Ion-channels and Lipid Membranes", supervised by Dr. Sol M. Gruner. She was a postdoctoral researcher at University of California Santa Barbara and Stanford University before becoming professor at University of Washington.

== Major publications ==
Keller studies the organization of lipids in membranes. Cell membranes are composed of lipids and proteins. Her early work "Separation of liquid phases in giant vesicles of ternary mixtures of phospholipids and cholesterol", one of the most cited papers in the Biophysical Journal, used fluorescence microscopy to observe a mixture of saturated and unsaturated lipids and observed microscopic separations of two coexisting liquid phases—miscibility transition. Her works contributed to models of protein aggregation within membranes and the theory of membrane lateral pressure.

Her recent work "Hallmarks of Reversible Separation of Living, Unperturbed Cell Membranes into Two Liquid Phases" found reversible phase separations over multiple warming and cooling cycles in yeast vacuoles, taking a step further towards conditions in living cells. Keller's follow-up work detailed that this transition is regulated by yeast and corresponds to their growth temperatures.

Because early life has the simple form of RNA encapsulated by fatty acid, Keller's work could also explore mysteries about the origin of life.

== Awards and honors ==
- 2021, Fellow of the Biophysical Society (BPS). Keller was elected fellow for her "pioneering, fundamental experimental contributions to the understanding of miscibility phase transitions in membrane systems."
- 2021, Sverdrup Visiting Scientist, Augsburg University
- 2019, Cottrell STAR Award, Research Corporation
- 2017, Avanti Award in Lipids, Biophysical Society
- 2016, Gabor A. and Judith K. Somorjai Visiting Miller Professorship Award, University of California, Berkeley, Miller Institute for Basic Research in Science
- 2014, Thomas E. Thompson Award, Membrane Structure and Assembly Subgroup (MSAS) Symposium
- 2013, Fellow of the American Association for the Advancement of Science (AAAS)
- 2011, Fellow of the American Physical Society (APS). Keller was elected a fellow for her "pioneering, fundamental contributions to the understanding of miscibility phase transitions in model surfactant and membrane systems."
- 2011, Member of the Washington State Academy of Sciences
- 2010, inaugural Avanti Young Investigator Award in Lipid Research, American Society for Biochemistry and Molecular Biology
- 2005, Margaret Oakley Dayhoff Award, Biophysical Society
- 2003, Cottrell Scholar Award, Research Corporation
- 2002, NSF CAREER Award

Keller was awarded the University of Washington Distinguished Teaching Award in 2006 and the department of chemistry Outstanding Teaching Award in 2004.
