= Hans Neurath =

Austrian-American biochemist (1909–2002)

- Born: October 29, 1909; Vienna, Austria
- Died: April 12, 2002 (aged 92); Seattle
- Education: University of Vienna (PhD 1933), University of Minnesota
- Known for: Physical chemistry of proteins
- Spouse: Susi Spitzer Neurath
- Children: 1
- Scientific career
- Fields: Protein chemistry
- Workplaces: Duke University; University of Washington, Seattle

Hans Neurath (October 29, 1909 – April 2002) was a biochemist, a leader in protein chemistry, and the founding chairman of the Department of Biochemistry at the University of Washington in Seattle. He was born in Vienna, Austria, and received his doctorate in 1933 from the University of Vienna. He then studied in London and at the University of Minnesota. In 1938, he was appointed professor at Duke University, where he established a research program on the physical chemistry of proteins.

Neurath was a member of the National Academy of Sciences and the American Academy of Arts and Sciences, and a foreign member of the Max Planck Society of Germany.

== Scientific research ==
Neurath had wide-ranging interests in the physical chemistry of proteins. He published seminal papers on protein structure and denaturation and debunked early models of protein structures, notably those of William Astbury. His research focused mainly on the proteolytic enzymes, which catalyze the hydrolysis of protein substrates.

Neurath's work on proteolytic enzymes included studies of trypsin, carboxypeptidase and thermolysin.

Neurath also studied other aspects of protein chemistry, such as protein denaturation and biological regulation.

== Writing and editing ==
Neurath wrote more than 400 papers. He was founding editor of two journals: Biochemistry, which he edited from 1961 to 1991; and Protein Science, which he edited from 1991 to 1998. He also edited three volumes of "The Proteins," a reference work.

== Work in Seattle ==
Neurath founded the department of biochemistry at the University of Washington, Seattle, and served as its chair from 1950 until 1975, when he retired. His department produced three winners of the Nobel Prize in Physiology or Medicine: Edwin G. Krebs and Edmond H. Fischer, who stayed in Seattle; and Martin Rodbell, who earned his PhD in the department and went on to a distinguished career at the NIH.

Neurath was also part-time scientific director of the Fred Hutchinson Cancer Research Center in Seattle.

== Personal life ==
Neurath was married to Susi Spitzer Neurath for 41 years. He had a son from an earlier marriage; two stepchildren, and three step-grandchildren.

He died at the age of 92 on April 12, 2002, in Seattle.

== Heritage ==
The Protein Society presents its annual Hans Neurath Award in recognition of "a recent contribution of unusual merit to basic protein science."
