= Judith Klein-Seetharaman =

American-German biochemist

- Born: May 30, 1971 (age 55)
- Education: University of Cologne; Massachusetts Institute of Technology
- Scientific career
- Workplaces: Carnegie Mellon; Colorado School of Mines; Arizona State University; University of Warwick; University of Pittsburgh
- Thesis: Visual signal transduction : studies of light-induced conformational changes in the cytoplasmic face of rhodopsin. (2000)

Judith Klein-Seetharaman (born May 30, 1971) is a German-American biochemist who is a professor at Arizona State University. Her research considers the structure-function properties of proteins using computational bio-linguistics. She was supported by the Bill & Melinda Gates Foundation to identify novel therapies to tackle HIV.

== Early life and education ==
Klein-Seetharaman was born in Germany. She completed her undergraduate training at the University of Cologne, where she earned dual honours in biology and chemistry. After earning her doctorate, she moved to the United States, where she worked in the laboratory of Har Gobind Khorana at the Massachusetts Institute of Technology. Her research considered conformational changes in rhodopsin, the G protein coupled receptor. She was a postdoctoral researcher at MIT with Harald Schwalbe, focusing on nuclear magnetic resonance spectroscopy. After eight months as a postdoc, Klein-Seetharaman moved Carnegie Mellon University where she worked with Raj Reddy in biology. She was eventually appointed to the faculty at Carnegie Mellon.

== Research and career ==
Klein-Seetharaman moved to the University of Pittsburgh as an assistant professor in 2002 and was promoted to associate professor in 2009. She joined the Warwick Medical School as a professor in medicine in 2013. She returned to the United States in 2017, first as a professor at the Colorado School of Mines and then as a professor at the Arizona State University in 2021. Her research looks to uncover the structure-property relationships of membrane proteins.

== Selected publications ==
- Valerian E Kagan; Gaowei Mao; Feng Qu; et al. (2016). "Oxidized arachidonic and adrenic PEs navigate cells to ferroptosis". Nature Chemical Biology. 13 (1): 81–90. doi:10.1038/nchembio.2238. PMC 5506843. PMID 27842066. Wikidata Q33897013.
- Chu, Charleen T.; Ji, Jing; Dagda, Ruben K.; Jiang, Jian Fei; Tyurina, Yulia Y.; Kapralov, Alexandr A.; Tyurin, Vladimir A.; Yanamala, Naveena; Shrivastava, Indira H.; Mohammadyani, Dariush; Qiang Wang, Kent Zhi; Zhu, Jianhui; Klein-Seetharaman, Judith; Balasubramanian, Krishnakumar; Amoscato, Andrew A.; Borisenko, Grigory; Huang, Zhentai; Gusdon, Aaron M.; Cheikhi, Amin; Steer, Erin K.; Wang, Ruth; Baty, Catherine; Watkins, Simon; Bahar, Ivet; Bayır, Hülya; Kagan, Valerian E. (2013). "Cardiolipin externalization to the outer mitochondrial membrane acts as an elimination signal for mitophagy in neuronal cells". Nature Cell Biology. 15 (10): 1197–205. doi:10.1038/ncb2837. PMC 3806088. PMID 24036476. Wikidata Q23910949.
- Valerian E. Kagan; Nagarjun V. Konduru; Weihong Feng; et al. (2010). "Carbon nanotubes degraded by neutrophil myeloperoxidase induce less pulmonary inflammation". Nature Nanotechnology. 5 (5): 354–359. Bibcode:2010NatNa...5..354K. doi:10.1038/nnano.2010.44. OCLC 612999337. PMC 6714564. PMID 20364135. S2CID 13364775. Wikidata Q23923187.
