= Society of General Physiologists =

- Founded: 1946
- Purpose: Physiology
- Location: Woods Hole, MA, USA
- Members: ~600
- Key people: Robert T. Dirksen, President
- Website: Society of General Physiologists

Society of General Physiologists logo.

The Society of General Physiologists (SGP) is a scientific organization whose purpose is to promote and disseminate knowledge in the field of general physiology, and otherwise to advance understanding and interest in the subject of general physiology. The Society’s main office is located at the Marine Biological Laboratory in Woods Hole, MA, where the society was founded in 1946. Past Presidents of the Society include Richard W. Aldrich, Richard W. Tsien, Clay Armstrong, and Andrew Szent-Gyorgi. The society's archives is held at the National Library of Medicine in Bethesda, Maryland.

== Membership ==
The Society's international membership is made up of nearly 600 career physiologists who work in academia, government, and industry. Membership in the Society is open to any individual actively interested in the field of general physiology and who has made significant contributions to knowledge in that field. The Society has become known for promoting research in many subfields of cellular and molecular physiology, but especially in the fields of membrane transport and ion channels, cell membrane structure, regulation, and dynamics, and cellular contractility and molecular motors.

== Activities ==
The major activity of the Society is its annual symposium, which is held at the Marine Biological Laboratory in Woods Hole, MA. Society of General Physiologists symposia cover the forefront of physiological research and are small enough to maximize discussion and interaction among both young and established investigators. Abstracts of the annual meeting are published in The Journal of General Physiology.

The 2015 symposium (September 16–20) topic is "Macromolecular Local Signaling Complexes." Detailed information regarding the scientific agenda and registration is provided at the symposium website:

https://web.archive.org/web/20150801070408/http://www.sgpweb.org/symposium2015.html

Recent past symposium topics include:

2014 Sensory Transduction

2013 The Enigmatic Chloride Ion: Transport, Regulation, and Roles in Physiology

2012 Integrative Membrane Physiology in the Post-Genome Era

2011 Mitochondrial Physiology and Medicine

2010 New Optical Methods in Cell Physiology

2009 Muscle in Health and Disease

2008 Calcium Signaling and Disease

2007 Membrane Biophysics of Fusion, Fission, and Rafts in Health and Disease

2006 Chemotaxis, Invasion, and Phagocytosis: From Bacteria to Humans

2005 Na,K-ATPase & Related Cation Pumps: Structures, Mechanisms, & Diseases

The Society also sponsors several award programs including the SGP Traveling Scholars Award Program to promote education and research in cell and molecular physiology.

== See also ==
- American Society of Exercise Physiologists
