= Dagmar Ringe =

American biochemist, educator

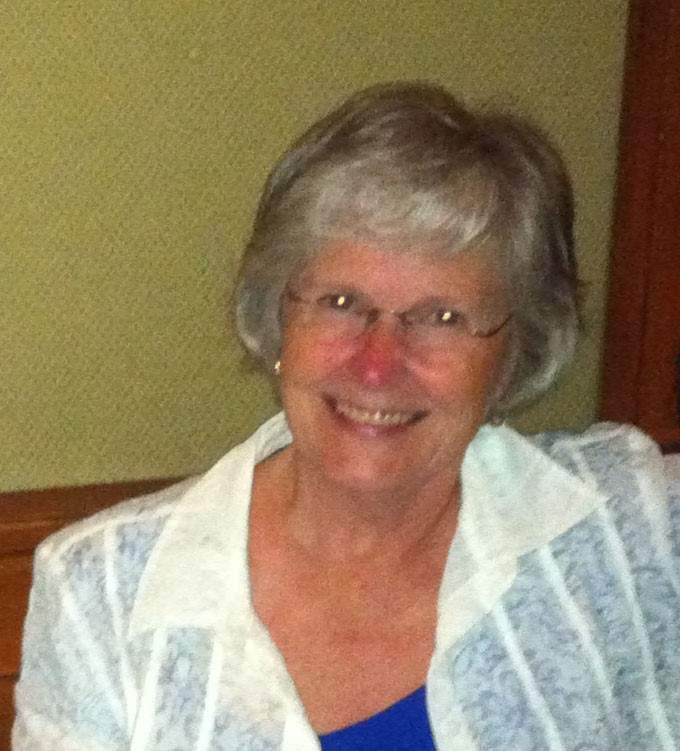
- Professor Dagmar Ringe
- Born: February 20, 1942 (age 84)
- Known for: Structures of pyridoxal phosphate dependent enzymes, Solvent mapping as an approach to drug discovery, Development of therapeutics for neurodegenerative diseases
- Awards: Biophysical Society Margaret Oakley Dayhoff Award (1985); Abram L. Sachar Medallion (2006); Alexander von Humboldt Forshingspreis (2006)
- Scientific career
- Fields: Chemistry, biochemistry, structural biology
- Workplaces: Brandeis University
- Doctoral advisor: George Hein

Dagmar Ringe (born February 20, 1942) is an American biochemist, educator, and researcher. She is the Harold and Bernice Davis Professor in Aging and Neurodegenerative Disease at Brandeis University in Waltham, Massachusetts, and holds appointments in the departments of chemistry and biochemistry.

== Education ==
Ringe received the bachelor's degree in chemistry from Barnard College in New York, New York, in 1963. She earned the doctoral degree in chemistry under the direction of George Hein at Boston University in Boston, Massachusetts, in 1969.

== Academic career ==
Following postdoctoral research appointments at the Fakultat der Universitat Munchen in Munich, Germany and at the Massachusetts Institute of Technology (MIT) in Cambridge, Massachusetts, she became instructor and senior lecturer in the department of chemistry at MIT. She joined the faculty at Brandeis University in 1990 as Lucille P. Markey Associate Professor, promoted to Lucille P. Markey Professor in 1994. She became the Harold and Bernice Davis Professor in Aging and Neurodegenerative Disease at Brandeis University in 2006.

== Service to the discipline ==
Ringe served as co-chair of the Gordon Research Conference on Enzymes, Co-enzymes and Metabolic Pathways in 1994 and was a member of the board of trustees of the Gordon Research Conferences (2000–2006). She was a program officer for the Program in Biophysics, Molecular and Cellular Biosciences, Division of Biology at the National Science Foundation (NSF) in 1997, 2000–2001 and 2010–2011 and served as deputy division director, molecular and cellular biosciences, Division of Biology, NSF, from 2012 to 2014. She was an associate editor of the Biophysical Journal (1999–2006) and is an editorial board member of the Protein Journal and Scientific Reports. She served as an advisor for the TV mini-series documentary The Mystery of Matter: Search for the Elements.

== Contributions to science ==
Ringe has made extensive contributions to understanding the structure and function of enzymes. Her recent work has centered on understanding the functions of proteins associated with neurodegenerative diseases, including Alzheimer's, Lou Gehrig's, and Parkinson's. She co-authored a 2015 study revealing a potential novel approach to the treatment of Parkinson's disease and identified new pathways in Parkinson's. She has also discovered potential new drugs to stop the protein aggregation that leads to Alzheimer's disease.

== Honors ==
- Biophysical Society Margaret Oakley Dayhoff Award (1985)
- Guggenheim Fellowship of the John Simon Guggenheim Memorial Foundation (1997)
- Fellow of the American Association for the Advancement of Science (since 2005)
- Abram L. Sachar Medallion from Brandeis University (2006)
- Alexander von Humboldt Forshingspreis (2006)

== Books ==
- Reactions and Syntheses in the Organic Chemistry Laboratory, L.F. Tietze and Th. Eichler, translated by Dagmar Ringe, University Science Books, Mill Valley, California, 1989.
- Primers in Biology: Protein Structure and Function, Gregory A. Petsko and Dagmar Ringe, New Science Ltd., London, 2004
- Cooperative Stewardship, National Research Council Report, J.J. Wise, Chair, 1999
- "Bridges to Independence: Fostering the Independence of New Investigators in Biomedical Research." National Research Council Report, 2005
- Bridging the Sciences, Report of the Interagency Coordinating Committee, Nov 9, 2004, NIH/NIBIB, NSF.
- Drug Design: Structure- and Ligand-Based Approaches, K.M.Merz, D. Ringe, C.H.Reynolds, eds. Cambridge University Press (2010).
