= Edwin Chapman (biochemist) =

American biochemist

- Born: July 20, 1962 (age 64); Bellingham, Washington
- Education: University of Washington
- Known for: Ca2+-triggered exocytosis
- Website: https://neuro.wisc.edu/staff/chapman-ed/

Edwin R. Chapman (born July 20, 1962, in Bellingham, Washington) is an American biochemist known for his work on Ca2+-triggered exocytosis. He currently serves as the Ricardo Miledi Professor of Neuroscience at the University of Wisconsin–Madison, where he is also an investigator of the Howard Hughes Medical Institute (HHMI).

== Education ==
Chapman received his Ph.D. from the University of Washington in Seattle and conducted post-doctoral studies with Reinhard Jahn at the HHMI at Yale University.

== Career ==
In 1996 he became an assistant professor in the Department of Physiology (later renamed Neuroscience) at the University of Wisconsin-Madison. In 2005, Chapman became a full professor and an HHMI Investigator. In 2018 he was named as the inaugural director of the Quantitative Membrane Biophysics Program at UW-Madison.

Chapman has made important contributions in three related areas: the molecular mechanisms by which Ca2+ triggers exocytosis in neurons and neuroendocrine cells, the structure and dynamics of exocytotic fusion pores, and the mechanisms by which botulinum and tetanus neurotoxins act on neurons to block exocytosis. He pioneered the use of time-resolved biochemical and biophysical methods to study protein-lipid and protein-protein interactions that mediate excitation-secretion coupling. His laboratory was the first to reconstitute Ca2+-triggered membrane fusion in vitro using purified components, and he has used this approach to make numerous crucial contributions concerning the mechanism by which proteins catalyze the merger of lipid bilayers. He is also a leader concerning our understanding of exocytotic fusion pores, using both cell- and nanodisc-based approaches to reveal their dynamics, composition, and structure. In parallel, his laboratory pioneered the identification of protein receptors for clostridial neurotoxins, including “Botox”. Other major contributions include on going studies to assign functions to orphaned synaptic vesicle proteins and to understand the function of all members of the synaptotagmin family of membrane trafficking proteins; this latter work has revealed a number of novel insights into synaptic plasticity.

== Achievements ==
Chapman has published more than 150 scientific research articles, and is listed on seven US-issued patents. He is the recipient of Shaw Scientist and Pew Scholar awards and in 2019 he was given the Sir Bernard Katz Award, from the Biophysical Society, for his work on Ca2+ sensors and fusion pores.

== Selected publications ==
- Tucker, W. C.; Weber, T.; Chapman, E. R. (2004). "Reconstitution of Ca2+-regulated membrane fusion by synaptotagmin and SNAREs". Science. 304 (5669): 435–8. Bibcode:2004Sci...304..435T. doi:10.1126/science.1097196. PMID 15044754. S2CID 18467299.
- Dong, M.; Yeh, F.; Tepp, W. H.; Dean, C.; Johnson, E. A.; Janz, R.; Chapman, E. R. (2006). "SV2 is the protein receptor for botulinum neurotoxin A". Science. 312 (5773): 592–6. Bibcode:2006Sci...312..592D. doi:10.1126/science.1123654. PMID 16543415. S2CID 2683835.
- Hui, E.; Johnson, C. P.; Yao, J.; Dunning, F. M.; Chapman, E. R. (2009). "Synaptotagmin-mediated bending of the target membrane is a critical step in Ca(2+)-regulated fusion". Cell. 138 (4): 709–21. doi:10.1016/j.cell.2009.05.049. PMC 2758036. PMID 19703397.
- Yao, J.; Gaffaney, J. D.; Kwon, S. E.; Chapman, E. R. (2011). "Doc2 is a Ca2+ sensor required for asynchronous neurotransmitter release". Cell. 147 (3): 666–77. doi:10.1016/j.cell.2011.09.046. PMC 3220409. PMID 22036572.
- Bao, H.; Goldschen-Ohm, M.; Jeggle, P.; Chanda, B.; Edwardson, J. M.; Chapman, E. R. (2016). "Exocytotic fusion pores are composed of both lipids and proteins". Nature Structural & Molecular Biology. 23 (1): 67–73. doi:10.1038/nsmb.3141. PMC 4756907. PMID 26656855.
- Bao, H.; Das, D.; Courtney, N. A.; Jiang, Y.; Briguglio, J. S.; Lou, X.; Roston, D.; Cui, Q.; Chanda, B.; Chapman, E. R. (2018). "Dynamics and number of trans-SNARE complexes determine nascent fusion pore properties". Nature. 554 (7691): 260–263. Bibcode:2018Natur.554..260B. doi:10.1038/nature25481. PMC 5808578. PMID 29420480.
