= Great Immigrants Award =

Annual award to honor naturalized US citizens

Great Immigrants, Great Americans
- Description: Recognizing notable contributions of immigrants to American society
- Country: United States
- Presented by: Carnegie Corporation of New York
- First award: 2006
- Website: carnegie.org/our-work/special-projects/great-immigrants/

Great Immigrants, Great Americans is an annual initiative by the Carnegie Corporation of New York to honor naturalized citizens of the United States who have made significant contributions to American society, democracy, and culture. Established in 2006, the annual campaign celebrates the legacy of Andrew Carnegie, a Scottish immigrant and philanthropist who founded the Carnegie Corporation. The honorees are announced each year on the Fourth of July.

== Background ==
The initiative was started in 2006, originally as a full-page advertisement in The New York Times newspaper honoring, "Immigrants: The Pride of America." The advertisment noted that Andrew Carnegie an "immigrant from Scotland" and stated, "We are committed to helping immigrants become integrated into the civic fabric of our nation because enlightened citizenship is the everlasting strength of our democracy."

== Criteria and selection process ==
Honorees are naturalized citizens of the United States who have demonstrated outstanding achievements and contributions in their respective fields. The initiative has recognized individuals from a wide range of backgrounds, including business leaders, educators, artists, scientists, and public servants.

== List of honorees ==
=== 2026 ===
Name	Profession	Country of birth
Iman Abuzeid	Cofounder and CEO, Incredible Health	Saudi Arabia
Sunil Amrith	Professor of History, Yale University	Kenya
Nikesh Arora	Chairman and CEO, Palo Alto Networks	India
Mahzarin R. Banaji	Professor of Psychology, Harvard University	India
Sanjiv Chopra	Professor of Medicine, Harvard Medical School	India
Ingrid Daubechies	Professor Emerita of Mathematics, Duke University	Belgium
Hernán Díaz	Author and Essayist	Argentina
Jane Fraser	Chair and CEO, Citi	Scotland
Johannes Fruehauf	Founder and Chairman, LabCentral, and President and CEO, BioLabs	Germany
Gabriela Hearst	Fashion Designer	Uruguay
Abbas Karimi	Paralympic Swimmer	Afghanistan
Reshma Kewalramani	President and CEO, Vertex Pharmaceuticals	India
Jeong H. Kim	Engineer, Entrepreneur, and Professor, University of Maryland	South Korea
Ling Ma	Author and Professor, University of Chicago	China
Cristian Măcelaru	Music Director, Cincinnati Symphony Orchestra and Orchestre National de France	Romania
Guadalupe Maravilla	Visual Artist	El Salvador
Joel Mokyr	Professor of Economics, Northwestern University	Netherlands
Hiroshi Motomura	Professor of Law, UCLA	Japan
Gregory Nagy	Professor of Classics, Harvard University	Hungary
Antonio Neri	President and CEO, Hewlett Packard Enterprise	Argentina
Cristina Rivera Garza	Author and Professor, University of Houston	Mexico
James A. Robinson	University Professor, Harris School of Public Policy, University of Chicago	United Kingdom
Hock E. Tan	President and CEO, Broadcom	Malaysia
Omar M. Yaghi	Professor of Chemistry, University of California, Berkeley	Jordan
Michelle Zatlyn	Cofounder and President, Cloudflare	Canada

Source: Associated Press.

=== 2025 ===
Name	Profession	Country of birth
Tope Awotona	Founder and CEO, Calendly	Nigeria
Moungi Bawendi	Professor of Chemistry, MIT	France
Helen M. Blau	Director, Baxter Laboratory for Stem Cell Biology, and Professor, Stanford University	England
Roger Cohen	Journalist and Paris Bureau Chief, The New York Times	England
Akiko Iwasaki	Professor of Immunobiology, Dermatology, and Epidemiology, Yale School of Medicine	Japan
Maz Jobrani	Comedian, Actor, and Author	Iran
Simon H. Johnson	Professor of Entrepreneurship, MIT Sloan School of Management	England
Michele Kang	Businesswoman, Sports Team Owner, and Philanthropist	South Korea
Shahid Khan	President and CEO, Flex-N-Gate	Pakistan
Manjusha P. Kulkarni	Executive Director, AAPI Equity Alliance	India
María Teresa Kumar	President and CEO, Voto Latino	Colombia
Tania León	Composer, Conductor, and Educator	Cuba
Sandra Leisa Lindsay	Vice President, Public Health Advocacy, Northwell Health	Jamaica
Luciano Marraffini	Professor, The Rockefeller University, and Investigator, Howard Hughes Medical Institute	Argentina
Priyamvada Natarajan	Professor of Astronomy and Physics, Yale University	India
Kareem Rahma	Comedian, Artist, and Musician	Egypt
Raul Ruiz	U.S. Congressman, California, District 25	Mexico
Manoochehr Sadeghi	Grand Master Musician and Educator	Iran
Yuanyuan Tan	Former Prima Ballerina, San Francisco Ballet	China
Avi Wigderson	Professor of Mathematics, Institute for Advanced Study	Israel

Source: Associated Press.

=== 2024 ===
Name	Profession	Country of birth
Leila Ahmed	Professor, Harvard Divinity School, and Author	Egypt
Mohammed Amer	Comedian and Actor	Kuwait
Abhijit Banerjee	Professor of Economics, MIT, and Nobel Prize Laureate	India
Leon Botstein	President, Bard College, Conductor, and Scholar	Switzerland
Mariano-Florentino (Tino) Cuéllar	President, Carnegie Endowment for International Peace and former California Supreme Court Justice	Mexico
Esther Duflo	Professor of Economics, MIT, and Nobel Prize Laureate	France
Sonia Gardner	Hedge Fund Manager and Cofounder, Avenue Capital Group	Morocco
Viviana Gradinaru	Professor of Neuroscience and Biological Engineering, Caltech	Romania
Abbas (Bas) Hamad	Grammy-Nominated Rapper	France
Eliu Misael (Michael) Hinojosa	Chief Impact Officer, engage2learn, and Former Superintendent, Dallas ISD	Mexico
Jensen Huang	Cofounder, President, and CEO, NVIDIA	Taiwan
Immaculée Ilibagiza	Author and Motivational Speaker	Rwanda
Sir Jonathan (Jony) Ive	Artist, Designer, and Technology Executive	England
Ashish Kumar Jha	Dean, School of Public Health, Brown University	India
Yann LeCun	Chief AI Scientist for Facebook AI Research (FAIR)	France
Jim Lee	President, Publisher, and Chief Creative Officer, DC Comics	South Korea
Homa Naficy	Librarian and Immigrant Advocate	France
Raj Panjabi	Global Healthcare Leader, Entrepreneur, and Former White House Official	Liberia
Eboo Patel	Founder and President, Interfaith America	India
Lorgia García Peña	Professor of Latinx Studies, Princeton University	Dominican Republic
Maria Ressa	Investigative Reporter and Nobel Prize Laureate	Philippines
Premal Shah	Social Entrepreneur and Cofounder, Kiva	India
Ocean Vuong	Poet, Novelist, and Essayist	Vietnam
Steven Yeun	Emmy-Winning and Academy Award–Nominated Actor	South Korea

Source: Andrew Cargenie Foundation.

2023
Name	Profession	Country of birth
Wesaam Al-Badry	Photographer, Investigative Journalist, and Interdisciplinary Artist	Iraq
Ana Lucia Araujo	Professor of History, Howard University	Brazil
Kyriacos A. Athanasiou	Professor of Biomedical Engineering, University of California, Irvine	Cyprus
Ajay Banga	President, World Bank, and Former CEO, Mastercard	India
Jean-Claude Brizard	President and CEO, Digital Promise	Haiti
Betty Kwan Chinn	Founder, Betty Kwan Chinn Homeless Foundation	China
Ghida Dagher	CEO and President, New American Leaders	Sierra Leone
Daniel Diermeier	Chancellor, Vanderbilt University	Germany
Miguel "Mike" B. Fernandez	Chairman and CEO, MBF Healthcare Partners	Cuba
Maria Freire	Global Health Leader and Biophysicist	Peru
Nina Garcia	Editor in Chief, Elle	Colombia
Timnit Gebru	Founder and Executive Director, Distributed AI Research Institute	Ethiopia
Karen González	Faith Leader, Writer, Speaker, and Immigrant Advocate	Guatemala
Azira G. Hill	Cofounder, Atlanta Symphony Orchestra Talent Development Program	Cuba
Roald Hoffmann	Professor Emeritus of Chemistry, Cornell University, and Nobel Laureate	Poland
Guido Imbens	Professor of Economics, Stanford University, and Nobel Laureate	Netherlands
Angélique Kidjo	Grammy Award–Winning Singer and UNICEF Goodwill Ambassador	Benin
Bernard Lagat	Champion Runner and Five-Time Olympian	Kenya
Min Jin Lee	Author and National Book Award Finalist	South Korea
Ted Lieu	U.S. Congressman, California, District 36	Taiwan
Karen Lozano	Professor of Mechanical Engineering, University of Texas Rio Grande Valley	Mexico
Daniel Lubetzky	Founder, KIND Snacks and Starts With Us	Mexico
J. Patrice Marandel	Former Chief Curator of European Art, Los Angeles County Museum of Art (LACMA)	France
Stephen Michael	Brigadier General, U.S. Army (ret.), and Senior Executive, UBS	Guyana
Alanis Morissette	Grammy Award–Winning Singer-Songwriter, Thought Leader, Wholeness Advocate	Canada
Ngozi Okonjo-Iweala	Director-General, World Trade Organization	Nigeria
Pedro Pascal	Actor and Time 100 Honoree	Chile
Susan Polgar	Chess Grandmaster and Triple-Crown World Champion	Hungary
Ke Huy Quan	Academy Award–Winning Actor	Vietnam
Helen Quinn	Professor Emerita of Physics, SLAC National Accelerator Laboratory, Stanford University	Australia
Julissa Reynoso	U.S. Ambassador to Spain and Andorra	Dominican Republic
Oscar A. Solis	10th Bishop, Diocese of Salt Lake City	Philippines
Ali Soufan	Chairman and CEO, The Soufan Group, and Former FBI Special Agent	Lebanon
Inge G. Thulin	Former Chairman, President, and CEO, 3M Company	Sweden
Ponsi Trivisvavet	CEO and Director, Inari	Thailand

2022
Name	Profession	Country of birth
Hakki Akdeniz	Owner, Champion Pizza, and Advocate for the Homeless	Turkey
Michael Amiridis	President, University of South Carolina	Greece
Bertine Bahige	Wyoming National Distinguished Principal, 2021	Congo (the Democratic Republic of the)
Maria Elena Bottazzi	Professor and Associate Dean, Baylor College of Medicine	Italy
Jorge Cavero	Doctor and Professor, University of Illinois College of Medicine	Bolivia
Ibrahim Cissé	Professor of Physics, MIT, and MacArthur Fellow	Niger
Herman Cornejo	Principal, American Ballet Theatre, and UN Messenger of Peace	Argentina
Bita Daryabari	Philanthropist, Entrepreneur, and Computer Scientist	Iran
Julie Delpy	Award-Winning Actress, Director, and Screenwriter	France
Fabienne Doucet	Educational Equity Advocate and Professor, New York University	Spain
Jill Ellis	Soccer Coach and President, San Diego Wave Fútbol Club	England
Daniel Finn	Pastor and Chaplain and Cofounder, Irish Pastoral Centre, Boston	Ireland
Lorena Garcia	Chef and Founder, Chica Restaurants	Venezuela
Jesus Garza	Mayor, Arcola, Illinois	Mexico
Aquilino Gonell	U.S. Capitol Police Officer and Congressional Gold Medal Recipient	Dominican Republic
Steffi Graf	Tennis Champion, Olympian, and Grand Slam Winner	Germany
Siegfried Hecker	Nuclear Scientist and Director Emeritus, Los Alamos National Laboratory	Poland
Nicole Hernandez Hammer	Environmental Scientist and Climate Justice and Labor Organizer, SEIU	Guatemala
Lina Hidalgo	Judge and Chief Executive, Harris County, Texas	Colombia
Jorge Labarga	Justice, Florida Supreme Court	Cuba
Padma Lakshmi	Host and Executive Producer, Top Chef and Taste the Nation	India
MJ Lee	White House Correspondent, CNN	South Korea
Polina Lishko	Professor, University of California, Berkeley, and MacArthur Fellow	Ukraine
Malinda Lo	Novelist and National Book Award Winner	China
Syukuro Manabe	Professor, Princeton University, and Nobel Laureate	Japan
Karen Nakamura	Professor of Anthropology, University of California, Berkeley	Indonesia
Arrey Obenson	President and CEO, International Institute of St. Louis	Cameroon
Toyin Ojih Odutola	Visual Artist	Nigeria
Ardem Patapoutian	Professor, Scripps Research Institute, and Nobel Laureate	Lebanon
Karl Racine	Attorney General, District of Columbia	Haiti
Punit Renjen	Global CEO, Deloitte	India
Tashitaa Tufaa	Owner, CEO, and President, Metropolitan Transportation Network	Ethiopia
Neil Young	Musician, Grammy Winner, and Rock & Roll Hall of Fame Inductee	Canada
Karen Zacarías	Award-Winning Playwright and Founder, Young Playwrights' Theater	Mexico

=== 2021 ===
Name	Profession	Country of birth
Gisèle Ben-Dor	Conductor Emerita, Pro Arte Chamber Orchestra of Boston	Uruguay
Albert Bourla	Chairman and CEO, Pfizer	Greece
Peter Carey	Novelist and Professor, Hunter College	Australia
Vija Celmins	Visual Artist	Latvia
Jun Cho	Supply Specialist, Delaware National Guard	South Korea
Millicent Comrie	OB-GYN and Director, Brooklyn Heights Women's Health Center, Maimonides Medical Center	Jamaica
Carlos del Rio	Public Health Advocate and Professor of Medicine, Emory University	Mexico
Gisele Barreto Fetterman	Founder, Free Store 15104, For Good PGH, and 412 Food Rescue	Brazil
Wayne A. I. Frederick	President and Professor of Surgery, Howard University	Trinidad and Tobago
Gita Gopinath	Chief Economist, International Monetary Fund	India
Shireen Hunter	Diplomat, International Relations Scholar, and Honorary Fellow, Alwaleed Center, Georgetown University	Iran
Anisa Ibrahim	Physician, Pediatrics Clinic, Harborview Medical Center	Somalia
Karine Jean-Pierre	White House Principal Deputy Press Secretary	Martinique
Ilya Kaminsky	Poet and Professor, Georgia Institute of Technology	Ukraine
Min Kao	Cofounder and Executive Chairman, Garmin International	Taiwan
Katalin Karikó	Scientist and Senior Vice President, BioNTech	Hungary
Young Kim	U.S. Congresswoman, California, District 39	South Korea
Olga Korbut	Olympic Medal–Winning Gymnast	Belarus
Ruth Lehmann	Professor of Biology, MIT	Germany
Carlos Lozada	Nonfiction Book Critic, The Washington Post	Peru
Kamlesh Lulla	NASA Scientist (Fmr. Chief Scientist for Earth Observations, Space Shuttle/ISS), Senior Advisor for University Research and Technology Collaboration at Johnson Space Center, NASA	India
Michael Mina	Chef and Founder, MINA Group	Egypt
Helen Mirren	Actress	England
Herro Mustafa	U.S. Ambassador to Bulgaria	Iraq
John Oliver	Comedian and Commentator	England
James Peebles	Professor Emeritus of Physics, Princeton University	Canada
Vincenzo Piscopo	President and CEO, United Spinal Association	Venezuela
Ivan Poupyrev	Director of Engineering and Technical Projects Lead, Google	Russia
Jorge Pulleiro	Idaho Teacher of the Year and U.S. Army Veteran	Argentina
Pedro A. Sanchez	Professor of Tropical Soils, University of Florida	Cuba
Nsé Ufot	Chief Executive Officer, New Georgia Project	Nigeria
Luis von Ahn	Cofounder and CEO, Duolingo	Guatemala
Ali Zaidi	Deputy White House National Climate Advisor	Pakistan
Xiaowei Zhuang	Professor of Chemistry and Chemical Biology, Harvard University	China

2020
Name	Profession	Country of birth
Njideka Akunyili Crosby	Visual Artist	Nigeria
Fabian Arias	Pastor, Iglesia de Sion, Saint Peter's Church, New York City	Argentina
Geno Auriemma	Head Coach, University of Connecticut Women's Basketball	Italy
Carmen C. Bambach	Curator, The Metropolitan Museum of Art	Chile
Sven Beckert	Professor of American History, Harvard University	Germany
Asmeret Asefaw Berhe	Professor of Soil Science and Falasco Chair in Earth Sciences, University of California, Merced	Eritrea
Afsaneh Mashayekhi Beschloss	Founder and CEO, RockCreek	Iran
Luciana Borio	VP, In-Q-Tel; Former Director, Medical and Biodefense Preparedness, National Security Council	Brazil
Joy Buolamwini	Founder, Algorithmic Justice League; Researcher, MIT Media Lab	Canada
David Byrne	Musician and Filmmaker	Scotland
Rukmini Callimachi	Foreign Correspondent, The New York Times	Romania
Fadi Chehadé	Co-CEO, Ethos Capital; Former President and CEO, ICANN	Lebanon
Raj Chetty	Professor of Economics, Harvard University	India
Ana Navarro-Cárdenas	Political Strategist and Commentator, CNN; Cohost, The View	Nicaragua
Monica Ponce de Leon	Architect and Founder, MPdL Studio; Professor and Dean, School of Architecture, Princeton University	Venezuela
Yaa Gyasi	Author	Ghana
Hans M. Kristensen	Director, Nuclear Information Project, Federation of American Scientists	Denmark
Marie Lafontant	Registered Nurse, Burn Unit, University of Chicago Medical Center	Haiti
Pedro Martinez	Superintendent, San Antonio Independent School District	Mexico
Afaf I. Meleis	Professor of Nursing and Sociology and Dean Emerita, University of Pennsylvania School of Nursing	Egypt
Miriam Merad	Director of the Precision Immunology Institute, Icahn School of Medicine at Mount Sinai	Algeria
Siddhartha Mukherjee	Author and Physician	India
Stephanie Murphy	U.S. Congresswoman, Florida, District 7	Vietnam
Abdullahi Ahmed An-Na'im	Professor of Law, Emory University School of Law	Sudan
Catherine O'Hara	Actress	Canada
Judea Pearl	Computer Scientist and Professor, University of California, Los Angeles	Israel
Anna Podolanczuk	Physician and Researcher, NewYork-Presbyterian/Columbia University Irving Medical Center	Poland
Alexei Ratmansky	Choreographer and Artist in Residence, American Ballet Theater	Russia
Teresa Romero	President, United Farm Workers	Mexico
Goli Sheikholeslami	President and CEO, New York Public Radio	Kuwait
Moncef Slaoui	Physician, Vaccine Researcher, and Chief Advisor, Operation Warp Speed	Morocco
Art Spiegelman	Graphic Novelist and Cartoonist	Sweden
Lt. Gen. (Ret.) Vincent Stewart	Former Deputy Commander, U.S. Cyber Command; Former Director, Defense Intelligence Agency	Jamaica
Lisa Su	President and CEO, Advanced Micro Devices (AMD)	Taiwan
Ramon Tallaj	Physician; Founder and Chair, SOMOS	Dominican Republic
M. Stanley Whittingham	Professor of Chemistry, Binghamton University, State University of New York	England
Paul Yoon	Rescue Paramedic, FDNY	South Korea
Eric Yuan	Founder and CEO, Zoom	China

2019
Name	Profession	Country of birth
Darius Adamczyk	Chairman and CEO, Honeywell	Poland
Angelika Amon	Cancer Researcher and Professor, MIT | Vilcek Prize in Biomedical Science	Austria
Julissa Arce	Author, Social Justice Advocate, and Cofounder, Ascend Educational Fund	Mexico
Branka Arsić	Professor of English and Comparative Literature, Columbia University | Guggenheim Fellow	Serbia
Richard Blanco	U.S. Inaugural Poet and Memoirist	Spain
Wolf Blitzer	Lead Political Anchor and Host, "The Situation Room," CNN	Germany
Ilia Calderón	Cohost, "Noticiero Univision" and "Aquí y Ahora," Univision	Colombia
Andrew Cherng	Cofounder, Cochair, and Co-CEO, Panda Restaurant Group, Inc.	China
Peggy Cherng	Cofounder, Cochair, and Co-CEO, Panda Restaurant Group, Inc.	Myanmar
Alon Cohen	Cofounder and President, Houzz	Israel
Wilmot Collins	Mayor, Helena, Montana	Liberia
Maria Cornejo	Fashion Designer and Founder, Zero + Maria Cornejo	Chile
Vilma Daza	Community Library Manager, Corona Branch, Queens Public Library	Peru
Angus Deaton	Professor of Economics and International Affairs Emeritus, Princeton University | Nobel Prize in Economics	Scotland
Gebisa Ejeta	Geneticist, Plant Breeder, and Professor, Purdue University | World Food Prize Laureate	Ethiopia
Gustavo García-Siller	Archbishop of San Antonio	Mexico
Theresia Gouw	Cofounder, Aspect Ventures	Indonesia
Prabal Gurung	Fashion Designer and Founder, Prabal Gurung	Singapore
Aleksandar Hemon	Writer and Professor of Creative Writing, Princeton University | MacArthur and Guggenheim Fellow	Bosnia and Herzegovina
Luchita Hurtado	Painter | Time 100 for 2019	Venezuela
Mukhtar M. Ibrahim	Founder and Executive Editor, "Sahan Journal"	Somalia
Rahul M. Jindal	Transplant Surgeon and Professor, Uniformed Services University of the Health Sciences	India
Dina Katabi	Professor of Electrical Engineering and Computer Science, MIT | MacArthur Fellow	Syria
Laila Lalami	Writer and Professor of Creative Writing, University of California, Riverside | Guggenheim Fellow and American Book Award Winner	Morocco
Young Jean Lee	Playwright and Professor of Theater and Performance Studies, Stanford University | Guggenheim Fellow	South Korea
Midori	Violinist, Educator, and Arts Advocate	Japan
Debbie Mucarsel-Powell	U.S. Congresswoman, Florida, District 26	Ecuador
M. Rosaria Piomelli	Architect and Former Dean, Spitzer School of Architecture, City College of New York	Italy
Tomás Pedro Regalado	Director, Office of Cuba Broadcasting, and Former Mayor, Miami, Florida	Cuba
Mariano Rivera	Hall of Fame Baseball Player and Philanthropist	Panama
Paymon Rouhanifard	Former Camden Schools Chief, and Cofounder and CEO, Propel America	Iran
Terence Tao	Professor of Mathematics, UCLA | MacArthur Fellow and Fields Medalist	Australia
Adi Tatarko	Cofounder and CEO, Houzz	Israel
Marc Tessier-Lavigne	Neuroscientist and President, Stanford University	Canada
Linus Torvalds	Creator of Linux and Git | Millennium Technology Prize Winner	Finland
Nari Ward	Artist and Distinguished Professor/Head of Sculpture, Hunter College | Guggenheim Fellow and Rome Prize Winner	Jamaica
Leana Wen	Physician and Public Health Leader	China
Nite Yun	Chef and Restaurateur | Vilcek Prize for Creative Promise in Culinary Arts	Thailand

=== 2018 ===
Name	Profession	Country of birth
Art Acevedo	Chief of Police, Houston, Texas	Cuba
Matee Ajavon	Professional Basketball Player	Liberia
Mohamad Ali	CEO, Carbonite	Guyana
Ruth Behar	Anthropologist and Writer	Cuba
Nicolas Berggruen	Founder and Chairman, Berggruen Institute	France
Max Boot	Military Historian and Columnist	Russia
Salud Carbajal	U.S. Congressman, California, District 24	Mexico
Ana Mari Cauce	President, University of Washington	Cuba
Bernard Cherkasov	Executive Director, Cradles to Crayons	Azerbaijan
Kerron Clement	Olympic Gold Medalist in Track and Field	Trinidad and Tobago
Rocco Commisso	Founder, Chairman, and CEO, Mediacom	Italy
Adriano Espaillat	U.S. Congressman, New York, District 13	Dominican Republic
Mona Hanna-Attisha	Pediatrician and Public Health Advocate	United Kingdom
James P. Gorman	CEO, Morgan Stanley	Australia
Pramila Jayapal	U.S. Congresswoman, Washington, District 7	India
Dara Khosrowshahi	CEO, Uber	Iran
Valentina Kozlova	Former Principal Dancer, New York City Ballet	Russia
Daniel Libeskind	Architect	Poland
Martyna Majok	Playwright, Pulitzer Prize in Drama	Poland
Imbolo Mbue	Author, PEN/Faulkner Award for Fiction	Cameroon
Shuji Nakamura	Engineer, Nobel Prize in Physics	Japan
Thomas Nagel	Philosopher, Rolf Schock Prize in Logic and Philosophy	Serbia
Kumail Nanjiani	Actor and Writer	Pakistan
Yvonne Orji	Actress	Nigeria
Carlos R. Ponce	Neuroscientist, Washington University School of Medicine in St. Louis	Mexico
Antoni Ribas	Physician and Director, Parker Institute for Cancer Immunotherapy, UCLA	Spain

2017
Name	Profession	Country of birth
Daron Acemoglu	Professor of Economics, MIT	Turkey
Hushang Ansary	Statesman, Philanthropist, and Entrepreneur	Iran
Kwame Anthony Appiah	Professor of Philosophy and Law, New York University	Ghana
Morena Baccarin	Actress	Brazil
Angel Cabrera	President, George Mason University	Spain
Do Won Chang	Cofounder and CEO, Forever 21	South Korea
Graciela Chichilnisky	Professor of Economics and Statistics, Columbia University	Argentina
Ralph de la Vega	Former Vice Chairman, AT&T	Cuba
Eric Gertler	Executive Chairman and CEO, U.S. News & World Report	Canada
Masha Gessen	Journalist	Russia
Suheir Hammad	Poet and Activist	Jordan
Oliver Hart	Nobel Memorial Prize in Economic Sciences and Professor, Harvard University	England
Anthony Hopkins	Actor	Wales
Daniel Kahneman	Nobel Memorial Prize in Economic Sciences Winner and Professor Emeritus, Princeton University	Israel
Abdul Karim Kallon	Judge, U.S. District Court for the Northern District of Alabama	Sierra Leone
J. Michael Kosterlitz	Nobel Prize Winner in Physics and Professor, Brown University	Scotland
Thai Lee	President and CEO, SHI International Corporation	Thailand
Douglas Leone	Venture capitalist and Global Managing Partner, Sequoia Capital	Italy
Max Levchin	Cofounder, PayPal	Ukraine
Margaret H. Marshall	Chief Justice (Retired), Massachusetts Supreme Court	South Africa
Nergis Mavalvala	Professor of Astrophysics, MIT	Pakistan
Ayman Mohyeldin	Journalist, NBC News	Egypt
Vivek H. Murthy	19th Surgeon General, United States of America	England
Shantanu Narayen	CEO, Adobe Systems Incorporated	India
Liam Neeson	Actor	Ireland
Thuy Thi Nguyen	President, Foothill College	Vietnam
Viet Thanh Nguyen	Pulitzer Prize-winning novelist	Vietnam
Chinelo Okparanta	Author	Nigeria
Ilhan Omar	State Representative, Minnesota House of Representatives	Somalia
Eren Ozmen	Owner and President, Sierra Nevada Corporation	Turkey
Zainab Salbi	Founder, Women for Women International	Iraq
Andrew Schally	Professor of Pathology, University of Miami	Poland
Jeff Skoll	Founder and Chairman, Skoll Foundation	Canada
Sir J. Fraser Stoddart	Board of Trustees Professor of Chemistry, Northwestern University	Scotland
David Thouless	Emeritus Professor, Department of Physics, University of Washington	Scotland
Norma Torres	Representative, 35th District of California, United States House of Representatives	Guatemala
Rainer Weiss	Professor Emeritus of Physics, MIT	Germany
Feng Zhang	Professor of Neuroscience, MIT and Broad Institute	China

2016
Name	Profession	Country of birth
Noubar Afeyan	Entrepreneur, venture capitalist, philanthropist	Lebanon
Selu Alofipo	Artist, White House “Champion of Change”	Samoa
Samantha Bee	Actress, comedian	Canada
Peter Blair Henry	Dean, Leonard N. Stern School of Business, New York University	Jamaica
Len Blavatnik	Industrialist, philanthropist	Ukraine
Roberta Capp	Physician and Public Health Expert	Brazil
Jim Carrey	Actor, Comedian	Canada
Mariano Castillo	Journalist; Soros Fellowship for New Americans recipient	Peru
Marcelo Claure	CEO of SoftBank International and former CEO, Sprint	Bolivia
Nadia Comaneci	Five-time Olympic gold medalist in gymnastics	Romania
Ron Daniels	President, Johns Hopkins University	Canada
Michaela DePrince	Ballerina, Dutch National Ballet	Sierra Leone
Jaha Dukureh	Founder, Safe Hands for Girls	Gambia
John L. Estrada	U.S. Ambassador to Trinidad and Tobago	Trinidad and Tobago
Florent Groberg	U.S. Army Captain (Ret.)	France
Farnam Jahanian	Provost, Carnegie Mellon University	Iran
Sally Jewell	Former U.S. Secretary of the Interior	England
Jan Koum	Co-founder and former CEO, WhatsApp	Ukraine
Fei-Fei Li	Computer Scientist, Google	China
Viet X. Luong	U.S. Army Brigadier General	Vietnam
Iqram Magdon-Ismail	Technology Entrepreneur	Zimbabwe
Vikram Malhotra	Chairman of the Americas, McKinsey & Company	India
Mehret Mandefro	Physician, anthropologist, filmmaker	Ethiopia
Michael Moritz	Chairman, Sequoia Capital	Wales
Bharati Mukherjee	National Book Critics Circle Award-winning author	India
Peter A. Nadosy	Managing Partner, East End Advisors	Hungary
Graham Nash	Grammy Award-winning singer-songwriter	England
Jacqueline H. Nguyen	United States Circuit Judge	Vietnam
Deogratias Niyizonkiza	Founder and CEO, Village HealthWorks	Burundi
Bennet Omalu	Forensic Pathologist, Discoverer of Chronic Traumatic Encephalopathy (CTE)	Nigeria
Jorge M. Pérez	Chairman and CEO, Related Group of Florida	Argentina
Thuan Pham	CTO, Uber Technologies, Inc.	Vietnam
Sundar Pichai	CEO, Google	India
Ana Luz Porzecanski	Conservation Biologist, Director, Center for Biodiversity & Conservation, Museum of Natural History	Uruguay
Wolfgang Puck	Chef and restaurateur	Austria
Azita Raji	Former Ambassador to Sweden, United States of America	Iran
Shaiza Rizavi	Partner, Gilder, Gagnon, Howe & Co.	Pakistan
Isabella Rossellini	Actress, model, filmmaker	Italy
Aziz Sancar	Biochemist and Biophysicist, University of North Carolina, Chapel Hill	Turkey
Piers J. Sellers	Former NASA astronaut; Deputy Director, NASA Sciences and Exploration Directorate	United Kingdom
Hari Sreenivasan	Anchor and Senior Correspondent, PBS NewsHour	India

2015
Name	Profession	Country of birth
Bette Bao Lord	Writer and human rights activist	China
Preet Bharara	United States Attorney for the Southern District of New York	India
Geraldine Brooks	Writer	Australia
Thomas Campbell	Director of the Metropolitan Museum of Art	Singapore
Rabia Chaudry	Attorney and author	Pakistan
Mica Ertegun	Interior Designer, Philanthropist	Romania
A. Gabriel Esteban	College president	Philippines
Stanley Fischer	Economist	Zambia
Jonathan Hunt	Journalist	United Kingdom
Malek Jandali	Composer and Pianist	Germany
Rakesh Khurana	Professor of sociology	India
Marie-Josée Kravis	Economist	Canada
Nastia Liukin	Gymnast	Russia
Ali Maleksadeh	College president	Iran
Lorne Michaels	Producer	Canada
Franziska Michor	Computational biologist	Austria
Anchee Min	Writer	China
Firouz Michael Naderi	NASA administrator	Iran
Azar Nafisi	English professor	Iran
Craig Nevill-Manning	Computer scientist	New Zealand
Maria Otero	Diplomat	Bolivia
Eddie Perez	Professional baseball player	Venezuela
Ilana Rovner	Circuit judge of the United States Court of Appeals for the Seventh Circuit	Latvia
Arturo Sandoval	Jazz musician	Cuba
Madhulika Sikka	Broadcast journalist	India
Thomas C. Südhof	Biochemist	Germany
Antonio M. Taguba	Retired Army Major General	Philippines
Ann Telnaes	Cartoonist	Sweden
Thalía	Singer and actress	Mexico
Tuyen Tran	Designer	Vietnam
Alex Trebek	Game show host	Canada
Sofia Vergara	Actress	Colombia
Abraham Verghese	Physician and writer	Ethiopia
Eugene Volokh	Law professor	Ukraine
Arieh Warshel	Biochemist and biophysicist	Israel
Sharmin Mossavar-Rahmani	Investor	United Kingdom
Raffi Yessayan	Associated justice on the Massachusetts Superior Court	Lebanon

2014
Name	Profession	Country of birth
Andre Aciman	Writer	Egypt
Einat Admony	Chef, Author	Israel
Avakian Arsen	CEO, Argo Tea	Armenia
Reza Aslan	Author	Iran
Roy L. Austin	Former U.S. Ambassador to Trinidad	Saint Vincent and the Grenadines
Ralph H. Baer	Inventor	Germany
Rosemary Barkett	Federal Judge	Mexico
Rudy Boschwitz	Former U.S. Senator	Germany
Andres Cantor	Sportscaster	Argentina
JuJu Chang	Broadcast journalist, ABC's Nightline	South Korea
Steve Chen	Entrepreneur	Taiwan
Maria Contreras-Sweet	Administrator, U.S. Small Business Administration	Mexico
Tan Dun	Composer	China
Patrick Gaspard	U.S. Ambassador to South Africa	Congo (the Democratic Republic of the)
Ivar Giaever	Physicist	Norway
Sophia Grojsman	Perfumer	Belarus
Roger Guillemin	Neuroscientist	France
Carolina Herrera	Fashion designer	Venezuela
Manuela Hoelterhoff	Journalist	Germany
Jacques Jiha	Commissioner, New York City Dept. of Finance	Haiti
Joyce L. Kennard	Justice	Indonesia
Daniel Dae Kim	Actor	South Korea
Rich Little	Comedian	Canada
Aasif Mandvi	Actor	India
Dave Matthews	Musician	South Africa
Satya Nadella	CEO, Microsoft	India
Yoichiro Nambu	Physicist	Japan
Masi Oka	Actor	Japan
Neri Oxman	Architect	Israel
Gholam Peyman	Ophthalmologist	Iran
Elena Pirozhkova	Wrestler	Russia
Sara Ramirez	Actress	Mexico
Pardis Sabeti	Computational biologist	Iran
Beheruz Sethna	Professor	India
Shimon Shmueli	Businessperson, Inventor	Israel
Maria Siemionow	Surgeon	Poland
Subra Suresh	President, Carnegie Mellon University	India
Vivienne Tam	Fashion designer	China
David Tran	Businessperson	Vietnam
Louis Van Amstel	Dancer	Netherlands
Lillian Vernon	Entrepreneur	Germany

2013
Name	Profession	Country of birth
Ilesanmi Adesida	Physicist	Nigeria
Ralph Alvarez	Businessperson	Cuba
Kofi Appenteng	President and CEO, Africa-America Institute	Ghana
Leonardo Balada	Composer	Spain
Liz Balmaseda	Journalist	Cuba
Mohamad Bazzi	Journalist	Lebanon
Carlos Tiburcio Bea	Judge	Spain
Safra Catz	Chief Executive, Oracle	Israel
John Cho	Actor	South Korea
Sheena Easton	Singer-songwriter	United Kingdom
Milos Forman	Film director	Czechia
Osvaldo Golijov	Composer	Argentina
Mazie Hirono	U.S. Senator	Japan
Melikset Khachiyan	Chess master	Azerbaijan
Nina Khrushcheva	Professor	Russia
Jamaica Kincaid	Author	Antigua and Barbuda
Mila Kunis	Actress	Ukraine
George Walter Landau	Diplomat	Austria
Chong-Moon Lee	Entrepreneur, philanthropist	South Korea
John Albert Leguizamo	Actor	Colombia
Zhou Long	Composer	China
Bernard Lown	Cardiologist	Lithuania
Ranan Lurie	Cartoonist	Egypt
Mee Moua	Politician	Laos
Shirin Neshat	Artist	Iran
André Previn	Conductor	Germany
Helen Reddy	Singer	Australia
Nouriel Roubini	Economist	Turkey
Bapsi Sidhwa	Novelist	Pakistan
Dimitri Simes	President and CEO, The Center for the National Interest	Russia
Sree Sreenivasan	Journalist	Japan
Sri Srinivasan	Judge	India
Aso Tavitian	Businessperson	Bulgaria
Shibley Telhami	Professor	Israel
Sebastian Thrun	Computer scientist, entrepreneur	Germany
Robert Tjian	Biochemist	Hong Kong
Ham Tran	Film director	Vietnam
Laurence Henry Tribe	Lawyer	China
Monique Truong	Author	Vietnam
Padmasree Warrior	Businessperson	India
Joanna Wysocka	Biochemist	Poland
Doualy Xaykaothao	Journalist, NPR	Laos
Paul Tiyambe Zeleza	Historian, Writer	Zimbabwe

2012
Name	Profession	Country of birth
Jill Ker Conway	Writer and College President	Australia
Goli Ameri	Diplomat	Iran
Cyrus Amir-Mokri	Advisor	Iran
Michael Arad	Architect	United Kingdom
Monika Bauerlein	Journalist, Editor-in-Chief	Germany
Hamid Biglari	Theoretical physicist	Iran
Theodore Bikel	Actor, musician	Austria
Robert Birgeneau	University administrator	Canada
Bert Blyleven	Professional baseball player	Netherlands
Martin Brodeur	Professional hockey player	Canada
Carlos Bustamante	Biophysicist	Peru
Tony Dovolani	Dancer	Kosovo
Nariman Farvardin	University administrator	Iran
Youssef Ghafari	Businessperson	Lebanon
Martin Indyk	Diplomat	United Kingdom
Ayesha Jalal	Historian	Pakistan
Lubomir (Lubosh) Kavalek	Chess master, journalist	Czechia
Fred Kavli	Physicist, businessperson	Norway
Gerda Weissmann Klein	Writer	Poland
Walter Kohn	Physicist	Austria
Michel Kouakou	Dancer, choreographer	Côte d'Ivoire
Angela Lansbury	Actress	United Kingdom
Chang-Rae Lee	Novelist	South Korea
Ivan Lendl	Professional tennis player	Czechia
Colum Mccann	Writer	Ireland
Cheryl Diaz Meyer	Photojournalist	Philippines
Mike Meyers	Comedian	Canada
Vali Nasr	Foreign policy expert	Iran
Joseph Neubauer	Businessperson	Palestine, State of
Mohammad H. Qayoumi	President, San Jose State University	Afghanistan
L. Rafael Reif	President, Massachusetts Institute of Technology	Venezuela
Sanya Richards-Ross	Track and field athlete	Jamaica
Abuhena Saifulislam	Navy chaplain	Bangladesh
Meryle Secrest	Biographer	United Kingdom
Harold Shapiro	Economist	Canada
Shirin Tahir-Kheli	Political scientist	India
Andrew Thomas	Astronaut	Australia
Alice Y. Ting	Chemist	Taiwan
Satish K. Tripathi	President, University at Buffalo	India
Chui L. Tsang	University administrator	China
Victor Ukpolo	Chancellor, Southern University at New Orleans	Nigeria
Lauri Vaska	Chemist	Estonia
Nora Volkow	Psychiatrist	Mexico
Richard Wolffe	Journalist and author	United Kingdom
Jenny Ming	President and CEO, Charlotte Russe	China

2011
Name	Profession	Country of birth
José Andrés	Chef	Spain
Ramani Ayer	Businessman	India
Eric Benhamou	Venture Capitalist	Algeria
Jamshed Bharucha	Cognitive neuroscientist	India
Simon Billinge	Physicist	United Kingdom
Gregory Chamitoff	Astronaut	Canada
Denny Chin	Judge	Hong Kong
Christo	Artist	Bulgaria
Varsovia Fernandez	President and CEO, Greater Philadelphia Hispanic Chamber of Commerce	Dominican Republic
C. Michael Foale	Astronaut	United Kingdom
Michael J. Fox	Actor	Canada
Helen Greiner	Entrepreneur	United Kingdom
Yibin Kang	Molecular biologist	China
Porochista Khakpour	Novelist	Iran
Mari Kimura	Violinist, composer	Japan
Vivek Kundra	IT administrator	India
Guillermo Linares	Politician	Dominican Republic
Wallace Loh	President, University of Maryland	China
Harmit Singh Malik	Evolutionary biologist	India
Michael A. Mcrobbie	President, University of Indiana	Australia
Dinaw Mengestu	Journalist, author	Ethiopia
Ioannis (Yannis) N. Miaoulis	President and director, Museum of Science, Boston	Greece
Steven Muller	University administrator	Germany
Chrysostomos L. “Max” Nikias	President, University of Southern California	Cyprus
Kojo Nnamdi	Journalist	Guyana
Eduardo Ochoa	President, California State University, Monterey Bay	Argentina
Eduardo José Padrón	President, Miami Dade College	Cuba
Raj Patel	Journalist	United Kingdom
Orlando Patterson	Sociologist	Jamaica
Samantha Power	United States Ambassador to the United Nations	Ireland
Albert Pujols	Professional baseball player	Dominican Republic
Safi Qureshey	Entrepreneur	Pakistan
Jorge Ramos	Journalist	Mexico
Hector Ruiz	Founder, chairman, Advanced Nanotechnology Solutions	Mexico
Gary Shteyngart	Novelist	Russia
Dumarsais Simeus	Businessperson	Haiti
Yakov Smirnoff	Comedian	Russia
Patrick Soon-Shiong	Surgeon	South Africa
Hao Jiang Tian	Opera singer	China
Jan Vilcek	Scientist	Slovakia
Gordana Vunjak-Novakovic	Biomedical engineer	Serbia
Simon Winchester	Author	United Kingdom
Yulia Zagoruychenko	Dancer	Russia
Huda Zoghbi	Geneticist	Lebanon

2010
Name	Profession	Country of birth
Paul Anka	Singer	Canada
Anousheh Ansari	Engineer, entrepreneur	Iran
Joseph Aoun	President, Northeastern University	Lebanon
Lidia Bastianich	Chef	Croatia
Elizabeth Blackburn	Researcher	Australia
Willard Boyle	Physicist	Canada
Yefim Bronfman	Pianist	Uzbekistan
Denise Scott Brown	Architect	Zambia
Semyon Bychkov	Conductor	Russia
Simon Cho	Speed skater	South Korea
Andrei Codrescu	Author, poet	Romania
Harold Evans	Journalist	United Kingdom
Tariq Farid	Entrepreneur	Pakistan
Ping Fu	Entrepreneur	China
Ric Fulop	Entrepreneur	Venezuela
Wayne Gretzky	Professional hockey player	Canada
Noosheen Hashemi	Philanthropist, investor	Iran
Maria Hinojosa	Journalist	Mexico
Djimon Hounsou	Actor	Benin
Gata Kamsky	Chess grandmaster	Russia
Sukhee Kang	Politician	South Korea
Charles Kao	Physicist	China
Har Gobind Khorana	Organic chemist	Pakistan
Maria Elena (Mel) Lagomasino	CEO & Managing Partner, WE Family Offices	Cuba
Jhumpa Lahiri	Writer	United Kingdom
John Liu	Politician	Taiwan
Joan Massagué	Researcher	Spain
Alejandro Mayorkas	Lawyer	Cuba
Paul Merage	Businessperson	Iran
Elon Musk	Entrepreneur	South Africa
Nitin Nohria	Dean, Harvard Business School	India
Yoko Ono	Artist, musician	Japan
Feniosky Peńa-Mora	Engineer	Dominican Republic
Paulina Porizkova	Fashion model	Czechia
Marcus Samuelsson	Chef	Ethiopia
Fayez Sarofim	Businessperson	Egypt
Nadja Salerno Sonnenberg	Violinist	Italy
Jack Szostak	Biochemist	United Kingdom
Tracey Ullman	Comedian	United Kingdom
Alexander Varshavsky	Biochemist	Russia
Andrew James Viterbi	Engineer	Italy
Zygi Wilf	Chairman, Minnesota Vikings	Germany
Anna Wintour	Artistic Director, Condé Nast Publications	United Kingdom
Joe Wong	Comedian	China
Flossie Wong-Staal	Virologist	China
Ahmed H. Zewail	Chemist	Egypt

2009
Name	Profession	Country of birth
Maurice Ashley	Chess grandmaster	Jamaica
Maureen O'Hara Blair	Actress	Ireland
Louise Bourgeois	Sculptor	France
Anh “Joseph” Cao	Politician	Vietnam
Howard G. Chua-Eoan	Journalist	Philippines
Cristeta Comerford	Chef	Philippines
Helene Cooper	Journalist, The New York Times	Liberia
Alan Cumming	Actor	United Kingdom
Samuel Der-Yeghiayan	Judge	Syria
Albert Einstein	Physicist	Germany
Farouk El-Baz	Geologist	Egypt
Craig Ferguson	Actor	United Kingdom
Adonal Foyle	Professional basketball player	Saint Vincent and the Grenadines
Andy Garcia	Actor	Cuba
Frank Gehry	Architect	Canada
Khaled Hosseini	Writer and Physician	Afghanistan
Alice S. Huang	Virologist	China
Eric R. Kandel	Medical doctor	Austria
Vinod Khosla	Businessperson	India
Jim Yong Kim	President, World Bank	South Korea
Maria Klawe	President, Harvey Mudd College	Canada
Heidi Klum	Fashion model	Germany
Peter D. Lax	Mathematician	Hungary
Tsung-Dao Lee	Physicist	China
Lara Logan	Television journalist	South Africa
Lopez Lomong	Track and field athlete	Sudan
Michael E. Lopez-Alegria	Astronaut	Spain
Kati Marton	Author	Hungary
Eliseo Medina	Labor organizer	Mexico
Robert Mehrabian	Chairman, president and CEO	Iran
Mario Molina	Chemist	Mexico
Paul Muldoon	Poet	Ireland
Carlos I. Noriega	Astronaut	Peru
Claes Oldenburg	Sculptor	Sweden
Thakoon Panichgul	Fashion designer	Thailand
Dina Habib Powell	Executive, philanthropist, political advisor	Egypt
Albio Sires	Congressman	Cuba
Oliver Smithies	Geneticist	United Kingdom
Elie Tahari	Fashion designer	Israel
Oscar L. Tang	Financier	China
Charlize Theron	Actress	South Africa
Isabel Toledo	Fashion designer	Cuba
Daniel C. Tsui	Physicist	China
Joseph Tusiani	Poet	Italy
S. R. Srinivasa Varadhan	Mathematician	India
Chen Ning Yan	Physicist	China
Shing Tung Yau	Mathematician	China

2008
Name	Profession	Country of birth
Cristina V. Beato	Doctor and public health professional	Cuba
W. Michael Blumenthal	Former U.S. Secretary of the Treasury	Germany
Pierce Brosnan	Actor	Ireland
Franklin Chang-Diaz	Astronaut, physicist	Costa Rica
Philippe De Montebello	Former director of the Metropolitan Museum of Art	France
Junot Diaz	Author	Dominican Republic
Jaime Escalante	Educator	Bolivia
Daisy Expósito-Ulla	CEO, D Esposito and Partners	Cuba
Peter Frampton	Musician	United Kingdom
John Fugh	Major general, advocate	China
Riccardo Giacconi	Physicist	Italy
Stanley Gorenc	General	Slovenia
Beverly Hall	Education administrator	Jamaica
Le Ly Hayslip	Author	Vietnam
Ha Jin	Author, poet	China
Andrea Jung	President and CEO, Avon Products	Canada
Teresa Heinz Kerry	Businessperson	Portugal
Renu Khator	Chancellor, University of Houston System	India
John Kluge	Entrepreneur	Germany
Madeleine Kunin	Former governor of Vermont	Switzerland
Loida Lewis	Businessperson	Philippines
Vincent Mai	Businessperson	South Africa
Elsa Murano	President, Texas A&M University	Cuba
Josie Natori	Fashion designer	Philippines
Martina Navratilova	Professional tennis player	Czechia
Hakeem Olajuwon	Professional basketball player	Nigeria
David J. O’Reilly	Chairman and CEO, Chevron Corporation	Ireland
David Ortiz	Professional baseball player	Dominican Republic
Frank Oz	Actor, director	United Kingdom
Vikram S. Pandit	Banker	India
Itzhak Perlman	Violinist and Conductor	Israel
Alfredo Quińones- Hinojosa	Surgeon	Mexico
Ciro Rodriguez	Former U.S. Representative	Mexico
Felix G. Rohatyn	Investment banker	Austria
Morley Safer	Broadcaster	Canada
Roald Sagdeev	Physicist	Russia
Renata Scotto	Opera singer	Italy
Charles Simic	Poet	Serbia
Steven Udvar-Hazy	CEO, Air Lease Corporation	Hungary
Osi Umenyiora	Professional football player	Nigeria
Pinchas Zuckerman	Violinist	Israel

2007
Name	Profession	Country of birth
Freddy Adu	Professional soccer player	Ghana
Dan Aykroyd	Actor	Canada
Ishmael Beah	Author	Sierra Leone
Tina Brown	Editor and Media Entrepreneur	United Kingdom
Zbigniew Brzezinski	Former national security advisor	Poland
Gerhard Casper	Former president, Stanford University	Germany
Liz Claiborne	Fashion designer	Belgium
Freeman Dyson	Physicist	United Kingdom
Victor Dzau	Doctor	China
Max Frankel	Journalist	Germany
Emilio Gonzalez	Former director, U.S. Citizenship and Immigration Services	Cuba
Jennifer Granholm	Former governor of Michigan	Canada
Carlos Gutierrez	Former secretary, U.S. Department of Commerce	Cuba
Salma Hayek	Actress, Director, and Producer	Mexico
Albert Hirschman	Economist	Germany
Christopher Hitchens	Journalist	United Kingdom
David Ho	Doctor	Taiwan
Arianna Huffington	Author, businessperson	Greece
Farooq Kathwari	CEO, Ethan Allen	India
Meb Keflezighi	Olympic marathoner	Eritrea
Sergei Khrushchev	Academic	Russia
Ted Koppel	Broadcast journalist	United Kingdom
Bai Ling	Actor	China
Robert Macneil	Journalist	Canada
Melquiades Martinez	Former U.S. Senator	Cuba
Rupert Murdoch	Media mogul	Australia
Dikembe Mutombo	Professional basketball player	Congo (the Democratic Republic of the)
Indra Nooyi	Chair and CEO, PepsiCo	India
Constantine Papadakis	Businessperson	Greece
Carlos Santana	Guitarist	Mexico
Charles Simonyi	Businessperson	Hungary
Melanie Stiassny	Researcher, curator	Germany
Sidney Taurel	Businessperson	Morocco
Dianne Von Furstenberg	Fashion designer	Belgium
Elie Wiesel	Author	Romania
Martin Yan	Chef	China
Jerry Yang	Co-founder, Yahoo!	Taiwan
Fareed Zakaria	Journalist	India
Mortimer Zuckerman	Media Proprietor and Business Executive	Canada

2006
Ann-Margret	Actor	Sweden
Iman	Fashion model, businessperson	Somalia
Madeleine Albright	U.S. Secretary of State (1997–2001)	Czechia
Isabel Allende	Author	Chile
Mario Andretti	Racecar driver	Italy
Isaac Asimov	Author	Russia
Mikhail Baryshnikov	Dancer	Latvia
Gunter Blobel	Biologist	Germany
Sergey Brin	Co-founder, Google	Russia
Elaine Chao	Former U.S. Secretary of Labor	Taiwan
Deepak Chopra	Author	India
Edwidge Danticat	Author	Haiti
Oscar De La Renta	Fashion designer	Dominican Republic
Viet Dinh	Lawyer	Vietnam
Gloria Estefan	Musician	Cuba
Patrick Ewing	Professional basketball player	Jamaica
Hanna Holborn Gray	Former president, University of Chicago	Germany
Andrew Grove	Businessperson	Hungary
Rajat Gupta	Businessperson	India
Zalmay Khalilzad	Diplomat	Afghanistan
Henry Kissinger	Former U.S. Secretary of State	Germany
Tom Lantos	Former U.S. Representative	Hungary
Yo-Yo Ma	Cellist	France
Pedro Martinez	Professional baseball player	Dominican Republic
Mike Nichols	Film and theater director	Germany
Pierre Omidyar	Entrepreneur and Philanthropist	France
I. M. Pei	Architect	China
Cesar Pelli	Architect	Argentina
Ileana Ros-Lehtinen	Congresswoman, (R-FL 27th District)	Cuba
John Shalikashvili	General	Poland
M. Night Shyamalan	Film director	India
Gene Simmons	Musician	Israel
George Soros	Investor, philnathropist	Hungary
An Wang	Businessperson	China
James Wolfensohn	Former president, World Bank	Australia
Elias Zerhouni	Radiologist	Algeria
