= Vilcek Foundation =

US-based private foundation

- Founded: 2000
- Founder: Jan and Marica Vilcek
- Type: Private Nonprofit Foundation
- Purpose: Arts, biomedical science, immigration
- Location: New York City, New York
- Key people: Jan Vilcek (Co-founder), Marica Vilcek (Co-founder), Rick Kinsel (President)
- Revenue: $19,837,752 (2014)
- Expenses: $4,822,527 (2014)
- Website: www.vilcek.org

The Vilcek Foundation is an American nonprofit organization. The foundation's programs include the Vilcek Foundation Prizes.

The Foundation was established in 2000 by Jan and Marica Vilcek, immigrants from the former Czechoslovakia. The mission of the Foundation was inspired by the couple's respective careers in biomedical science and art history, as well as their appreciation for the opportunities offered to them as newcomers to the United States.

== Prizes ==
=== Vilcek Prizes ===
The Vilcek Prizes are awarded to foreign-born permanent residents of the United States, with significant accomplishments in the arts and sciences. The Foundation awards two Vilcek Prizes annually, one in biomedical science and the other in the arts and humanities. Each prize consists of a $100,000 cash award and a commemorative sculpture designed by Austrian-born graphic designer Stefan Sagmeister.

=== Vilcek Prize for Excellence ===
The Vilcek Prize for Excellence, introduced in 2019, recognizes immigrants who have profoundly impacted American society and world culture or individuals who champion immigrant causes. The recipients receive a $100,000 cash award and a commemorative diploma designed by the &Walsh agency.

=== Vilcek Prizes for Creative Promise ===
The Vilcek Prizes for Creative Promise are awarded to foreign-born individuals who have demonstrated outstanding achievement during the early stages of their careers. The Vilcek Prizes for Creative Promise are awarded each year in the field of biomedical science and a selected art field. Creative Promise applicants are required to submit essays, personal statements, and examples of their work. To be eligible for the prize, applicants must have been born abroad, reside permanently in the United States, and be within the specified age limit. As of 2013, three prizes each were to be awarded in biomedical science and a designated art field. Each recipient is awarded a $50,000 cash prize and a commemorative plaque.

=== Marica Vilcek Prize in Art History ===
In 2024, the Vilcek Foundation announced a new prize, The Marica Vilcek Prize in Art History. The prize is named for the Foundation's co-founder Marica Vilcek's career in art history. The prize is awarded to foreign-born art history and museum professionals whose work has had a profound impact on their institutions, and on their field or area of scholarship and curatorial work more broadly. In its inaugural presentation in 2024, three prizes of $100,000 each were awarded to Monika Bincsik, Pierre Terjanian, and Wolfram Koeppe.

The Vilcek Prizes for Creative Promise in Curatorial Work recognize immigrant professionals whose work has a profound impact in their field, and on arts and culture more broadly.

=== Vilcek-Gold Award for Humanism in Healthcare ===
In 2019, the Vilcek Foundation partnered with the Arnold P. Gold Foundation to create a joint award, the Vilcek-Gold Award for Humanism in Healthcare. The award is given to a foreign-born individual in the United States who has demonstrated an extraordinary impact on humanism in healthcare through their professional achievements.

The 2019 Vilcek-Gold Award for Humanism in Healthcare was given to Dr. Mona Hanna-Attisha for her advocacy and interventions in addressing the water crisis in Flint, Michigan. Dr. Vivek Murthy, 19th and 21st Surgeon General of the United States, was the recipient of the 2020 Vilcek-Gold Award for Humanism in Healthcare. Dr. Jirayut 'New' Latthivongskorn and Dr. Denisse Rojas Marquez were the joint recipients of the 2021 Vilcek-Gold Award for Humanism in Healthcare.

=== New American Perspectives ===
Since 2007, the Vilcek Foundation has been a sponsor of the New American Perspectives (formerly the "New American Filmmakers") program at the Hawaii International Film Festival (HIFF). Curated and presented in collaboration with HIFF, the program celebrates foreign-born filmmakers' contributions to cinema in the United States.

=== Prize recipients ===
==== Vilcek Prizes ====
Name	Year	Category	Country of Birth
Marianne Bronner	2025	Biomedical Science	Hungary
Guadalupe Maravilla	2025	Visual Arts	El Salvador
Oluremi C. Onabanjo	2025	Curatorial Work	United Kingdom to Nigerian parents
Luciano Marraffini	2024	Biomedical Science	Argentina
Ramon Tejada	2024	Design	Dominican Republic
Alejandro Sánchez Alvarado	2023	Biomedical Science	Venezuela
Du Yun	2023	Music	China
Angélique Kidjo	2023	Music	Benin
Vishva M. Dixit	2022	Biomedical Science	Kenya
Soledad Barrio	2022	Dance	Spain
Ruth Lehmann	2021	Biomedical Science	Germany
Rodrigo Prieto	2021	Filmmaking	Mexico
Xiaowei Zhuang	2020	Biomedical Science	China
Edwidge Danticat	2020	Literature	Haiti
Angelika Amon	2019	Biomedical Science	Austria
Marcus Samuelsson	2019	Culinary Arts	Ethiopia
Alexander Rudensky	2018	Biomedical Science	Russia
Teddy Cruz	2018	Architecture	Guatemala
Lily Jan; Yuh Nung Jan	2017	Biomedical Science	China
Nari Ward	2017	Fine Arts	Jamaica
Dan Littman	2016	Biomedical Science	Romania
Blanka Zizka	2016	Theatre	Czech Republic
Peter Walter	2015	Biomedical Science	Germany
Andrew Bolton	2015	Fashion	United Kingdom
Thomas Jessell	2014	Biomedical Science	United Kingdom
Neri Oxman	2014	Design	Israel
Richard Flavell; Ruslan Medzhitov	2013	Biomedical Science	United Kingdom; Uzbekistan
Yo-Yo Ma	2013	Contemporary Music	France (to Chinese parents)
Carlos Bustamante	2012	Biomedical Science	Peru
Mikhail Baryshnikov	2012	Dance	Latvia (to Russian parents)
Titia de Lange	2011	Biomedical Science	Netherlands
Charles Simic	2011	Literature	Yugoslavia
Alexander Varshavsky	2010	Biomedical Science	Russia
José Andrés	2010	Culinary Arts	Spain
Huda Zoghbi	2009	Biomedical Science	Lebanon
Mike Nichols	2009	Filmmaking	Germany
Inder Verma	2008	Biomedical Science	India
Osvaldo Golijov	2008	Music	Argentina
Rudolf Jaenisch	2007	Biomedical Science	Germany
Denise Scott Brown	2007	Architecture	Zambia
Joan Massagué	2006	Biomedical Science	Spain
Christo and Jeanne-Claude	2006	Fine Art	Bulgaria, Morocco (to French parents)

==== Vilcek Prizes for Excellence ====
Name	Year	Category	Country of Birth
Dr. Henry Louis Gates Jr.	2025	Literary Scholarship	United States
Katalin Karikó	2022	Biotechnology	Hungary
Andrew Yang	2021	Public Service	United States
Robert A. Katzmann	2020	Administration of Justice	United States
Carmen C. Bambach	2019	Art History and Museum Work	Chile

==== Vilcek Prizes for Creative Promise ====
Name	Year	Category	Country of Birth
Elham Azizi	2025	Biomedical Science	Iran
Guosong Hong	2025	Biomedical Science	China
Maayan Levy	2025	Biomedical Science	Israel
Selva Aparicio	2025	Visual Artist	Spain
Felipe Baeza	2025	Visual Artist	Mexico
Jeffrey Meris	2025	Visual Artist	Haiti, raised in the Bahamas
Donna Honarpisheh	2025	Curatorial Work	Canada to Iranian parents
Aimé Iglesias Lukin	2025	Curatorial Work	Argentina
Bernardo Mosqueira	2025	Curatorial Work	Brazil
Gerta Hoxhaj	2024	Biomedical Science	Albania
Tomasz Nowakowski	2024	Biomedical Science	Poland
Takanori Takebe	2024	Biomedical Science	Japan
Wael Morcos	2024	Design	Lebanon
Juan Carlos Noguera	2024	Design	Guatemala
Maryam Turkey	2024	Design	Iraq
Edward Chouchani	2023	Biomedical Science	Canada
Biyu J. He	2023	Biomedical Science	China
Shixin Liu	2023	Biomedical Science	China
Arooj Aftab	2023	Music	Saudi Arabia (to Pakistani parents)
Juan Pablo Contreras	2023	Music	Canada
Ruby Ibarra	2023	Music	Philippines
Markita del Carpio Landry	2022	Biomedical Science	Canada
Hani Goodarzi	2022	Biomedical Science	Iran
Harris Wang	2022	Biomedical Science	China
Tatiana Desardouin	2022	Dance	Switzerland
Tamisha Guy	2022	Dance	Trinidad
Leonardo Sandoval	2022	Dance	Brazil
Juan Pablo González	2021	Filmmaking	Mexico
Miko Revereza	2021	Filmmaking	Philippines
Nanfu Wang	2021	Filmmaking	China
Mohamed Abou Donia	2021	Biomedical Science	Egypt
Ibrahim Cissé	2021	Biomedical Science	Niger
Silvi Rouskin	2021	Biomedical Science	Bulgaria
Kivanç Birsoy	2020	Biomedical Science	Turkey
Viviana Gradinaru	2020	Biomedical Science	Romania
Martin Jonikas	2020	Biomedical Science	France
Yaa Gyasi	2020	Literature	Ghana
Valeria Luiselli	2020	Literature	Mexico
Jenny Xie	2020	Literature	China
Amit Choudhary	2019	Biomedical Science	India
Jeanne T. Paz	2019	Biomedical Science	Georgia
Mikhail G. Shapiro	2019	Biomedical Science	Russia
Tejal Rao	2019	Culinary Arts	United Kingdom
Fabian von Hauske Valtierra	2019	Culinary Arts	Mexico
Nite Yun	2019	Culinary Arts	Thailand
Polina Anikeeva	2018	Biomedical Science	Russia
Sergiu P. Pașca	2018	Biomedical Science	Romania
Feng Zhang	2018	Biomedical Science	China
Mona Ghandi	2018	Architecture	Iran
James Leng	2018	Architecture	China
Jing Liu	2018	Architecture	China
Michaela Gack	2017	Biomedical Science	Germany
Michael Halassa	2017	Biomedical Science	Jordan
Ahmet Yildiz	2017	Biomedical Science	Turkey
Iman Issa	2017	Fine Arts	Egypt
Meleko Mokgosi	2017	Fine Arts	Botswana
Carlos Motta	2017	Fine Arts	Colombia
Fernando Camargo	2016	Biomedical Science	Peru
Roberta Capp	2016	Biomedical Science	Brazil
Houra Merrikh	2016	Biomedical Science	Iran
Sarah Benson	2016	Theatre	United Kingdom
Desdemona Chiang	2016	Theatre	Taiwan
Yi Zhao	2016	Theatre	China
Sun Hur	2015	Biomedical Science	South Korea
Rob Knight	2015	Biomedical Science	New Zealand
Franziska Michor	2015	Biomedical Science	Austria
Siki Im	2015	Fashion	Germany, to Korean parents
Natallia Pilipenka	2015	Fashion	Belarus, to Ukrainian parents
Tuyen Tran	2015	Fashion	Vietnam
Antonio Giraldez	2014	Biomedical Science	Spain
Stavros Lomvardas	2014	Biomedical Science	Greece
Pardis Sabeti	2014	Biomedical Science	Iran
Yasaman Hashemian	2014	Design	Iran
Mansour Ourasanah	2014	Design	Togo
Quilian Riano	2014	Design	Colombia
Hashim Al-Hashimi	2013	Biomedical Science	Lebanon
Michael Rape	2013	Biomedical Science	Germany
Joanna Wysocka	2013	Biomedical Science	Poland
James Abrahart	2013	Contemporary Music	United Kingdom
Samuel Bazawule	2013	Contemporary Music	Ghana
Tigran Hamasyan	2013	Contemporary Music	Armenia
Alice Ting	2012	Biomedical Science	Taiwan
Michel Kouakou	2012	Dance	Ivory Coast
Yibin Kang	2011	Biomedical Science	China
Dinaw Mengestu	2011	Literature	Ethiopia
Harmit Malik	2010	Biomedical Science	India
Varin Keokitvon	2010	Culinary Arts	Laos
Howard Chang	2009	Biomedical Science	Taiwan
Ham Tran	2009	Filmmaking	Vietnam

In 2013, the Vilcek Prizes for Creative Promise were changed from recognizing one winner and four finalists to recognizing three winners in each category. The past finalists are listed below.

Name	Year	Category	Country of Birth
Konrad Hochedlinger	2012	Biomedical Science	Austria
Andreas Hochwagen	2012	Biomedical Science	Austria
Songhai Shi	2012	Biomedical Science	China
Benjamin tenOever	2012	Biomedical Science	Canada
Fanny Ara	2012	Dance	Spain
Thang Dao	2012	Dance	Vietnam
Alice Gosti	2012	Dance	Italy
Pontus Lidberg	2012	Dance	Sweden
Katherine Fitzgerald	2011	Biomedical Science	Ireland
Ekaterina Heldwein	2011	Biomedical Science	Russia
Galit Lahav	2011	Biomedical Science	Israel
Elina Zuniga	2011	Biomedical Science	Argentina
Ilya Kaminsky	2011	Literature	Ukraine
Tea Obreht	2011	Literature	Serbia
Vu Tran	2011	Literature	Vietnam
Simon Van Booy	2011	Literature	Wales
Iannis Aifantis	2010	Biomedical Science	Greece
Rustem Ismagilov	2010	Biomedical Science	Russia
Vamsi Mootha	2010	Biomedical Science	India
Jin Zhang	2010	Biomedical Science	China
Michael Cheng	2010	Culinary Arts	Malaysia
Yoshinori Ishii	2010	Culinary Arts	Japan
Nandini Mukherjee	2010	Culinary Arts	India
Boris Portnoy	2010	Culinary Arts	Russia
Katerina Akassoglou	2009	Biomedical Science	Greece
Evgeny Nudler	2009	Biomedical Science	Russia
F. Nina Papavasiliou	2009	Biomedical Science	Greece
Aviv Regev	2009	Biomedical Science	Israel
Almudena Carracedo	2009	Film	Spain
Amin Matalqa	2009	Film	Jordan
Kirill Mikhanovsky	2009	Film	Russia
Shih-Ching Tsou	2009	Film	Taiwan

==== Marica Vilcek Prize in Art History ====
Name	Year	Citation	Country of Birth
Francesca Du Brock	2025	"Francesca Du Brock, chief curator of the Anchorage Museum of Art, is named winner of the 2025 Marica Vilcek Prize in Art History for her holistic and comprehensive approach to exhibition curation. An artist and educator, Du Brock’s work embodies the spirit of collaboration and inclusivity, emphasizing the importance of diverse perspectives in museum spaces."	United States
Monika Bincsik	2024	"Monika Bincsik receives the Marica Vilcek Prize in Art History for her curatorial approach to Japanese decorative arts and textiles that highlights the interplay of Japanese and international trade, politics, and society on material culture over the past five centuries."	Hungary
Wolfram Koeppe	2024	"Wolfram Koeppe receives the Marica Vilcek Award in Art History for his contributions to the study and curation of European decorative arts objects, and for his work to develop exhibitions and displays that engage and inspire audiences of all ages."	Germany
Pierre Terjanian	2024	"Pierre Terjanian receives the Marica Vilcek Prize in Art History for his work to foster community, dialogue, and understanding through his leadership with the Metropolitan Museum of Art, and for his thoughtful scholarship on objects of arms and armor."	France

==== Vilcek-Gold Award for Humanism in Healthcare ====
Name	Year	Citation	Country of Birth
Mona Fouad	2022	"For her leadership in health disparities research, and her career-long commitment to equity in healthcare. Fouad's work has been foundational in the development of rigorous research and interventions to make healthcare more accessible and equitable to historically underserved populations in the United States."	Egypt
Jirayut 'New' Latthivongskorn	2021	"For providing a supportive path for undocumented immigrants to pursue careers in healthcare, and for advocacy in support of undocumented immigrants in the U.S." (Awarded jointly with Denisse Rojas Marquez).	Thailand
Denisse Rojas Marquez	2021	"For providing a supportive path for undocumented immigrants to pursue careers in healthcare, and for advocacy in support of undocumented immigrants in the U.S." (Awarded jointly with Jirayut 'New' Latthivongskorn).	Mexico
Vivek Murthy	2020	"For leadership in addressing the opioid crisis and supporting public health education in the U.S."	UK, to Indian parents
Mona Hanna-Attisha	2019	"For exposing lead poisoning in Flint, Michigan, through public water supply"	UK, to Iraqi parents

== Art collections ==
The Vilcek Foundation holds several art collections that are promised gifts from founders Jan and Marica Vilcek. These collections include the American Modernism Collection, which traces the development of artists such as Oscar Bluemner, Ralston Crawford, Stuart Davis, and Marsden Hartley, as well as the movement as a whole; the Native American Pottery Collection, which consists primarily of objects by Acoma, Hopi, Cochiti, Kewa, Tesuque, Zia, and Zuni potters, dating from the 19th and 20th centuries; and the Pre-Columbian Collection, which features objects from across the pre-Columbian world, with an emphasis on the art of Mesoamerica, and a Collection of Art by Immigrant Artists.

== Events and exhibitions ==
In 2019, the Vilcek Foundation opened its new headquarters on Manhattan's Upper East Side, which includes two floors of gallery space. The gallery is the site of free, public exhibitions based on the Vilcek Foundation Art Collections. The Vilcek Foundation also partners with institutions throughout the United States and around the globe to develop and share exhibitions featuring work from the Vilcek Foundation Art Collections with the wider public.

=== Grounded in Clay: The Spirit of Pueblo Pottery (2022-2025) ===
In July 2022, the Vilcek Foundation supported the development and opening of the exhibition, Grounded in Clay: The Spirit of Pueblo Pottery at the Museum of Indian Arts and Culture in Santa Fe, New Mexico. The exhibition features works of Pueblo Pottery from the Vilcek Foundation Collection and from the collection of the Indian Arts Research Center at the School for Advanced Research. The exhibition was curated by a group of more than 60 artists, historians, and stewards of Native American art, the Pueblo Pottery Collective, and is accompanied by a catalogue from Merrell Publishers. In July 2023, the exhibition opened in New York with works on view at the Vilcek Foundation and The Metropolitan Museum of Art.

=== Nari Ward: Home of the Brave (2022-2023) ===
In May 2022, the Vilcek Foundation opened an exhibition, Nari Ward: Home of the Brave, featuring sculptures and installations by Jamaican-born artist and Vilcek Prize winner Nari Ward. The exhibition was on view by appointment in the Vilcek Foundation headquarters through March, 2023.

=== Ralston Crawford: Air + Space + War (2021-2022) ===
The Vilcek Foundation presented its second major exhibition featuring works by American Modernist Ralston Crawford, following Ralston Crawford: Adventurer in the Arts. Curated by Emily Schuchardt Navratil, this landmark exhibition collected an extensive group of drawings, paintings, and photographs that document the influence of Crawford's experiences in the U.S. military on his life and work.

Ralston Crawford: Air + Space + War centers on commissions Crawford undertook at the Curtiss-Wright Aircraft Plant in Buffalo, New York, and his assignment to document nuclear weapons tests conducted by the U.S. Joint Army/Navy Task Force at Bikini Atoll for Fortune Magazine in 1946.

Ralston Crawford: Air + Space + War opened at the Brandywine River Museum of Art in June 2021, where it was on view through September 2021. The exhibition subsequently opened at the Dayton Art Institute in October 2021, where it was on view through January 2022.

=== Ralston Crawford: Torn Signs (2019) ===
Ralston Crawford: Torn Signs was the first exhibition shown in the Vilcek Foundation's headquarters at 21 East 70th Street, New York, New York. The exhibition features works by American Modernist Ralston Crawford. Ralston Crawford: Torn Signs opened in April 2019, and was on view through November, 2019. A digital exhibition featuring selected works from the exhibition was shared on the Vilcek Foundation website from 2020 – 2021.

Curated by Emily Schuchardt Navratil, Ralston Crawford: Torn Signs explores the national and international influences on the multifaceted Canadian-born artist. Although he earned acclaim early in his career for his Precisionist paintings of an industrialized America, Crawford devoted the latter part of his career to abstract painting with a remarkable emotional dimension. Ralston Crawford: Torn Signs focuses on two series—"Torn Signs" and "Semana Santa"—that the artist developed over the last two decades of his life.

=== The Synchromists and Oscar Bluemner's Sonnet Series (2020-2022) ===
In early 2020, the Vilcek Foundation launched two concurrent exhibitions in the Vilcek Foundation's headquarters, The Synchromists, and Oscar Bluemner's Sonnet Series.

The Synchromists includes works by Morgan Russell and Stanton Macdonald-Wright, the founders of Synchromism.

Oscar Bluemner's Sonnet Series comprises a series of sketches for paintings by Oscar Bluemner based on 12 sonnets by poet Eirene Mungo-Park.

The exhibitions were displayed at the Vilcek Foundation in the spring of 2020; as a result of the COVID-19 pandemic, the foundation pivoted to launch these exhibitions online on the foundation's website. Both exhibitions are now part of the Vilcek Foundation's traveling exhibition initiative.

In Summer of 2022 The Synchromists opened at the Thyssen-Bornemisza Museum in Madrid.

=== Marsden Hartley: Adventurer in the Arts (2021) ===
Marsden Hartley: Adventurer in the Arts debuted at the Bates College Museum of Art in Lewiston, Maine in September, 2021. Curated by Emily Schuchardt Navratil, Marsden Hartley: Adventurer in the Arts brings together over 35 paintings and drawings spanning four decades of artwork by American Modernist Marsden Hartley.

To organize this unique exhibition, the Vilcek Foundation partnered with the Bates College Museum of Art, home to the Marsden Hartley Memorial Collection.

The exhibition is accompanied by a full-colour catalogue from Merrell Publishers.

=== Earlier events and exhibitions ===
The Vilcek Foundation's former headquarters, also on the Upper East Side, was the host of exhibitions and events featuring the work of immigrant artists, designers, filmmakers, and others.

Exhibition/Event	Type of Event	Year	Participant(s)	Participant's Country of Birth
Brian Doan: hôme hôme hôme	Mixed-media Installation	2013	Brian Doan	Vietnam
Pivotal Works: The Vilcek Foundation Project	Series of Dance performances	2012	Michel Kouakou; Fanny Ara; Thang Dao; Alice Gosti; Pontus Lidberg	Ivory Coast; France; Vietnam; Italy; Sweden
I Am Your Mirror	Photography, Mixed-media Installation	2012	O Zhang	China
Almost Undone	Mixed-media Installation	2011	Nicole Awai	Trinidad
String Theater	Concert	2011	Mari Kimura	Japan
The New Vernacular: Immigrant Authors in American Literature	Literature Reading	2011	Dinaw Mengestu; Ilya Kaminsky; Téa Obreht; Vu Tran; Simon Van Booy; Liesl Schillinger (host)	Ethiopia; Russia; Yugoslavia; Vietnam; United Kingdom -
Caring and Advocating for Torture Survivors	Lecture	2011	Allen Keller (Lecturer); Samten Dapka; Cheikhna Mahawa	Tibet; Mauritania
Senbazuru	Mixed-media Installation	2010	Toshiko Nishikawa	Japan
Transparency	Fashion Presentation	2010	Madina Vadache	Russia
The Vilcek Foundation Celebrates LOST	Photography Installation, Exhibition of Original Props	2010	24 Immigrant and First Generation Cast and Crew of ABC's LOST	Brazil, Chile, China, Cuba, England, Germany, Ireland, Japan, Mexico, Netherlands, New Zealand, Panama, Poland, South Africa, Philippines, South Korea, Tonga
Circumplex	Video Art Installation	2009	Kai-Duc Luong	Cambodia
enTANGOed	Concert	2009	Peter Breiner	Slovakia
Mephistophelean	Exhibition of Sculpture	2009	Ryo Toyanaga	Japan
Japanese Art Today: Takashi Murakami and "Superflat" in Context	Lecture	2009	Eleanor Heartney	
Why 1960's Japanese Art? Global Implications for Contemporary Art History	Lecture	2009	Reiko Tomii	Japan
Asian American Artist and the Transmission of the East to the American Avant-Garde	Lecture	2009	Alexandra Munroe	
American Immigrant Filmmakers on Profile	Film Screening	2008	Sarab Neelam; Sielu Avea; Stephane Gauger; Kai-Duc Luong; Christine Choy; Sherwood Hu	India; Samoa; Vietnam; Cambodia; China; China
The Gatekeeper of Emmyoin	Film Screening	2008	Reiko Tahara; Max Uesugi	Japan; Japan
Il Lee and Pouran Jinchi: Curated by Art Projects International	Exhibition of paintings and drawings	2008	Il Lee; Pouran Jinchi	South Korea; Iran

== Publications ==
- Kinsel, Rick, et al. Grounded in Clay : The Spirit of Pueblo Pottery. Merrell Publishers, 2022.
- Kinsel, Rick, et al. Ralston Crawford, Air + Space + War. Merrell Publishers Limited; in association with Vilcek Foundation, 2021.
- Kinsel, Rick, et al. Marsden Hartley : Adventurer in the Arts. Merrell Publishers Limited; in association with Vilcek Foundation, 2020.
- Agee, William C., et al. Masterpieces of American Modernism : From the Vilcek Collection. Merrell Publishers Limited, 2013.
- Langholtz, Gabrielle, and Rick Kinsel. A Place at the Table : New American Recipes from the Nation's Top Foreign-Born Chefs. Prestel, 2019.
- Agee, William C., et al. Ralston Crawford : Torn Signs. Merrell Publishers Ltd., in association with Vilcek Foundation, 2019.
- Vilcek Foundation. American Odysseys : Writings by New Americans. First Dalkey Archive edition, Dalkey Archive Press, 2013.
