= Motomura =

Motomura (written: 本村) is a Japanese surname. Notable people with the surname include:

- Gouichi Motomura (本村 剛一, born 1973), Japanese tennis player
- Hiroshi Motomura (born 1953), American legal scholar and writer
- Nobuko Motomura (本村 伸子, born 1972), Japanese communist
