= Soledad Barrio =

Spanish flamenco performer

- Born: 1964 (age 60–61); Madrid, Spain
- Occupation: Flamenco dancer

Soledad Barrio (born 1964) is a Spanish flamenco dancer. She founded the Noche Flamenca dance company where she performs and teaches, and has received critical acclaim for her performances.

== Biography ==
From her birth in 1964, Barrio grew up in Madrid under the Francoist dictatorship which imprisoned her grandfather. She began dancing from four years of age and at 19, was inspired by the 1981 flamenco film Blood Wedding to leave university to pursue dancing flamenco professionally.

She began to train to be a flamenco dancer in the studio Amor de Dios at Centro Nacional de Arte Flamenco and saved money to continue her training by dancing at hotels. Here, she would train under well-known flamenco performers including Paco Romero, Manolete, El Güito, and María Magdalena.

In 1992 while training at Amor de Dios, Barrio met her future husband, Martin Santangelo. Santangelo was an actor performing with El Teatro Campesino and a beginner in flamenco when they met. By 1993, they had moved together to New York City and founded a dance studio together, the Noche Flamenca.

== Awards ==
- Dance Magazine Exceptional Artist Award (2015)
- Bessie Award for Performer (2001)
- Bessie Award for Performer (2022)
- Vilek Prize for Dance (2022)
