= Nsé Ufot =

American voting rights activist

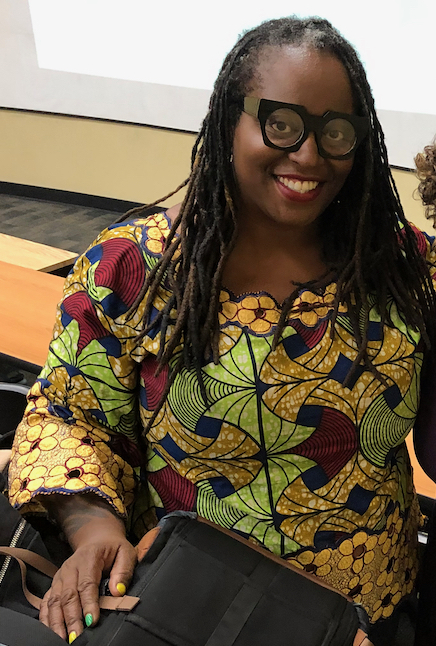
- Ufot in 2019
- Born: Nseabasi Ufot; Nigeria
- Education: Georgia Institute of Technology (BS); University of Dayton (JD)
- Employer: New Georgia Project
- Known for: Voting rights activism
- Honours: 2021 Time 100 Next

Nsé Ufot is an activist, community organizer, and the former chief executive officer of the New Georgia Project, a voter support and legal action nonprofit organization founded by Stacey Abrams in 2013. Ufot's organizing efforts in the Georgia 2020 United States presidential election and the 2021 run-off election contributed to turning the state blue. In 2021, she was named one of Time's 100 Next, nominated by Ai-jen Poo. Ufot was fired from the New Georgia Project in 2022, with the group stating that she owes hundreds of thousands of dollars in non-work related expenses.

== Early life and education ==
Ufot was born in Nigeria and was raised in Southwest Atlanta, Georgia. Ufot cites her experience as a naturalized American citizen as a driver for her commitment to ensuring voting rights. When she was 14, she served as a page for the Georgia House of Representatives. She attended the Georgia Institute of Technology for her undergraduate studies, where she received a Bachelor of Science degree in psychology in 2002. She then attended the University of Dayton School of Law, where she received her Juris Doctor degree.

== Career ==
Ufot began her career as a corporate lawyer before becoming a labor rights lobbyist and advocate. She was the assistant executive director of the Canadian Association of University Teachers, Canada's largest faculty union, and later served as the Senior Lobbyist and Government Relations Officer for the American Association of University Professors.

She then became the CEO of the New Georgia Project, a nonpartisan, non-profit organization founded by Stacey Abrams to educate and register voters of color in Georgia, and its associated action fund, which supports reforms to increase the civic participation of communities of color. Prior to the 2020 United States presidential election, the New Georgia Project registered over 50,000 Georgians to vote. In the lead-up to the January 2021 Congressional run-off election, Ufot organized volunteers to knock on over two million doors in Georgia, registering nearly 7,000 people in the 30 days following the November general election.

In 2022, Ufot was fired without notice from the New Georgia Project. Financial disclosures from the group indicate that Ufot owes the New Georgia Project hundreds of thousands of dollars in "non-work-related" expenses. The disclosures also revealed that the New Georgia Project paid $533,846 in consulting fees and a $67,500 grant to the Black Male Initiative, a charity involving Ufot's brother. Ufot denied owing money while the Black Male Initiative has denied receiving these payments.

== Award and honors ==
- 40 Under 40, Georgia Tech Alumni Association, 2020
- Time 100 Next, 2021
- "Great Immigrant, Great American" selected by the Carnegie Corporation in 2021
