= Nicole Awai =

American visual artist (born 1966)

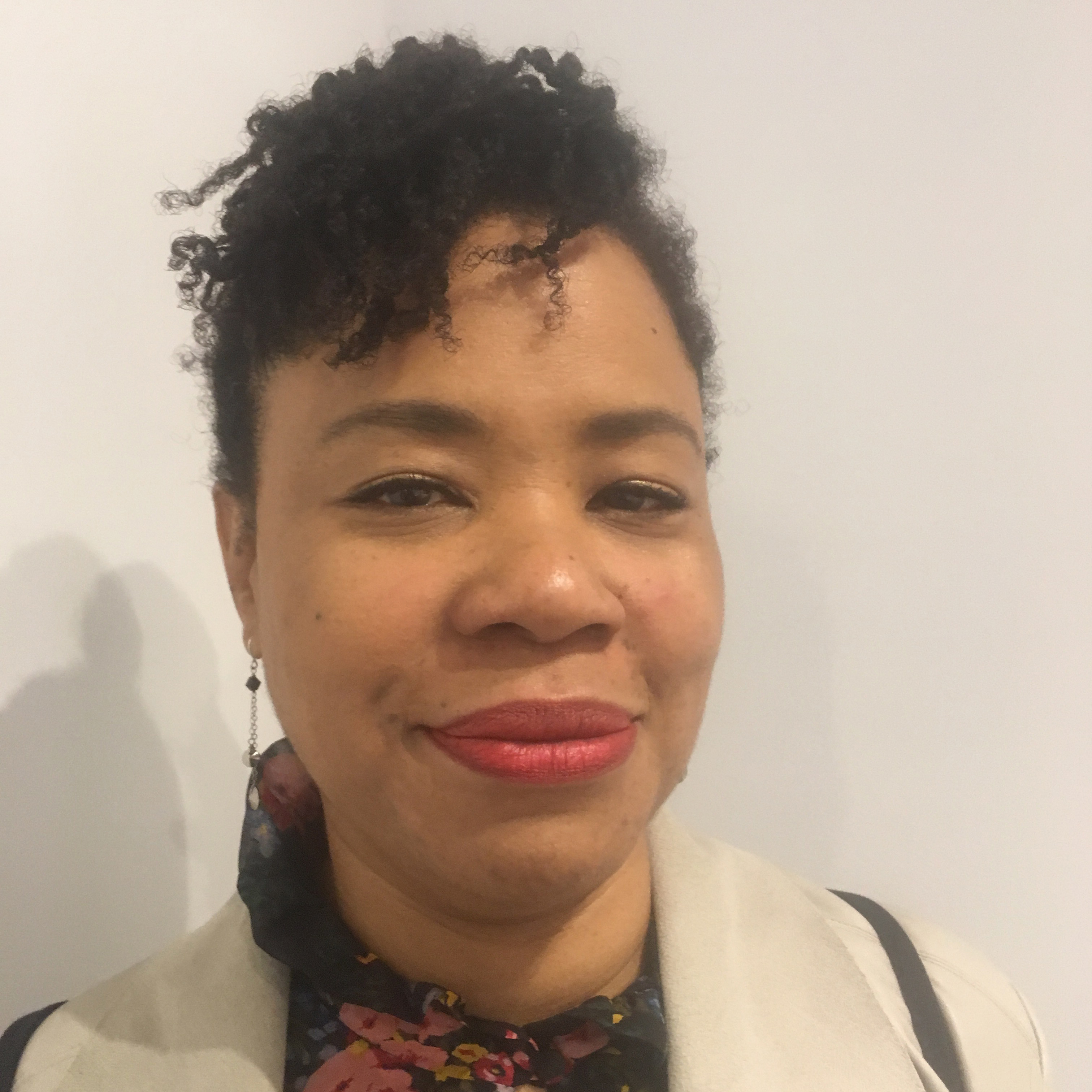
- Nicole Awai at Leslie Heller Gallery opening of group show "Said By Her" May 29, 2018
- Born: Nicole Awai; 1966 (age 59–60); Port of Spain, Trinidad
- Education: BA, MFA in Multimedia Art from the University of South Florida
- Known for: Painting, Drawing, Photography, Installation, Ceramics, Sculpture
- Awards: The Joan Mitchell Painters and Sculptors Grant (2011), Art Matters Grant (2012), Puffin Grant (1998)
- Website: https://www.nicoleawai.com/

Nicole Awai (born 1966) is an artist and educator based in Brooklyn, New York and Austin, Texas. Her work captures both Caribbean and American landscapes and experiences and engages in cultural critique. She works in many media including painting, photography, drawing, installations, ceramics, and sculpture as well as found objects.

== Early life ==
She was born in Port-of-Spain, Trinidad. She is of Afro-Asian ancestry.

== Education ==
She received her Bachelor of Arts in 1991, and a 1996 Master of Fine Arts in painting and printmaking, both from the University of South Florida. In 1997 she attended Skowhegan School of Painting and Sculpture in Maine.

== Career ==
Early in her career in 2000 Holland Cotter remarked in the New York Times that Awai's then figurative paintings were sourced with "unprettified technique and a metaphorical bent" and that West Indies Colonialism was her subject. He speculated that in her overlaid images representing memories of the island of her childhood, the shifting of backgrounds and foregrounds in her paintings was a good way to think about history. He noted that in the 2000 exhibition at the Studio Museum in Harlem curated by Thelma Golden, Awai shared with other artists such as Sanford Biggers a looser sort of cultural signage as well as a post-1990s identity fluidity.

Rocio Aranda-Alvarado, Senior Curator at El Museum del Barrio, described her layered imagery as identity politics that include both popular culture and her own personal manual of images.

In 2018 Awai became involved as an artist in the U.S. monuments dispute. Generated after the Charlottesville, Virginia demonstration of white supremacy that sparked nationwide reconsideration of monuments to the Confederacy still in existence, Awai's proposal for a new monument was one of several done by artists for a New York Times article. Her monument rendering was inspired by the Grand Army Plaza memorial arch which is a tribute to fighters for the Union, focusing on the African-American man who surveys and stands ready for battle.

When the conversation about who should be represented on a public pedestal broadened to deprecation of all indigenous peoples a commission was created to re-evaluate the monuments of New York City. Cecilia Alemani, director and chief curator of High Line Art created New Monuments for New Cities and chose Awai's rendered proposal, a street drain in the shape of a man's torso and face that reads “Reclaimed Water.” Carved into the metal at the bottom, a plaque of sorts, reads “Christopher Columbus”.

Academic Positions

From 2009 to 2015 she held the position of Critic for the Yale School of Art. She is currently assistant professor of painting and drawing at the University of Texas at Austin's Department of Art and Art History.

Artist Residences

- Artists in the Market Place, Bronx Museum of the Arts, (1997-1998)
- Artist-in-Residence, Art Center South Florida, Miami Beach, FL.(1998)
- BRIC Media Arts Fellowship Fellowship, Brooklyn, NY (1999)
- Studio Museum in Harlem (1999-2000),
- Artist-in-Residence, Hunter College, Art Department, New York, NY. (2000)
- Triangle Arts Trust's Big River International Artists' Workshop, Caribbean Contemporary Arts Port-of-Spain, Trinidad (2001)
- Emerge Program, Aljira, A Center for Contemporary Art, Newark, NJ
- Art Omi International Artist's Colony, Hudson / New York, NY (2004)
- Artist-in-Residence, Jamaica Center for Arts and Learning, Queens, NY. (2004)
- John Michael Kohler, Arts Center, Sheboygan, WI (2008)
- Smack Mellon Studio Program, (2010)
- AIR, Alice Yard, Port of Spain Trinidad, (2013)
- Lower Manhattan Cultural Council, Process Space Residency Program, (2015)
- BRIC Workspace Residency, Brooklyn, NY (2017)
- Joan Mitchell Center in April (2018)

Grants

- Payson Fellowship, Skowhegan School of Painting and Sculpture, Skowhegan, Maine / New York, NY (1997)
- Puffin Foundation Grant, Puffin Foundation LTD, Teaneck, NJ. (1998)
- Painters and Sculptors Grant, the Joan Mitchell Foundation (2011)
- Art Matters Grant, Art Matters Foundation (2012)
- Colene Brown Art Prize (2019)

== Selected works ==
Panyard (2001) The title referring to the panyard which is a practice space for steel drummers in the West Indian festival of Carnival. Ex-Trinidadians Nicole Awai and Terry Boddie (re)envision it in a Brooklyn NY gallery using elements of drawing, photography, sculpture. Historian Rocio Armanda-Alvaraz writes about their intent to reconsider minimalist art language of the 1970s to bring a sophisticated yet non-narrative version of carnival, borrowing from an ethnicized and racialized past that has asserted itself, via their installation, in the present. The installation was shown at FiveMyles Gallery in Brooklyn New York.

Local Ephemera, 2007 Subjects and objects depicted in action are drawn in a looser, colorful style. They contrast with the mechanical blueprint '"language" that other objects are rendered in "to bring clarity where there is none". Notable works from Local Ephemera include Specimen from Local Ephemera: Tension Springs (2004), Specimen from Local Ephemera: Drab Hanger (2007), Specimen from Local Ephemera: Castle Nut and Drama Queen (2007), and Specimen from Local Ephemera: Resistance with Black Ooze (2005)

Almost Undone, 2011 was the title of an exhibition in September, 2011 at The Vilcek Foundation Gallery. The sculpture incorporated a wide variety of materials such as sprayed paper, resin, plastic, nail polish, and clay, resulting in bold, complex three-dimensional structures, which seemed to pull, stretch, and tear from the wall. in conjunction with her earlier works of her Local Ephemera series The sculpture creates its own multi-dimensional adaptation from that series, reconstituting one dimension into the next.

Asphaltum Glance, 2013 was a painting on the walls of the small gallery at Alice Yard in her native Trinidad. Awai explored the origins of the viscosity and blackness that were a long-standing staples of her painting oeuvre. Through an Art Matters Grant trip in 2012 to Le Brea a childhood memory of a nearby pitch lake resonated with her so she photographed close-up details of it as the basis for wall sized paintings for the gallery. Speaking about the connection between the black ooze and Caribbean identity, Awai says, "The pitch lake is constantly replenishing itself, just like us, taking on new form." According to Awai, asphalt is, "literally the remnants of all of us, the decomposition of all flora and all fauna over the course of known time that keeps turning, churning and revealing at the same instance material and items randomly from yesterday and four hundred years ago." Before leaving Trinidad, Awai painted over Asphaltum Glance as a way of continuing her themes of "regeneration and malleability."

Notes for Material Re-pose, 2016 Critical Practices/ 21st Projects, New York, NY was the exhibition site for a sculpture intended to make viewers aware of their own material present/ presence, Awai posited a continual back and forth between narrative and matter in immediate time and perpetual history. She chose these exhibits for their "informal viewings" of artists' works, intending to set up the normative space for cultural consumption and bring the audience into a domestic setting."

Vistas, 2017 shown at Leslie Heller Gallery consists of a series Awai had been working on since 2013. As a mental view of a succession of remembered events they were partially focused on the characteristics of asphalt ooze of her prior work. “Vistas are momentary glimpse experiences. There is a feeling of impermanence, of possible shift, change or impending disappearance, illusive physicality that may actually be imagined and ephemeral. Vistas could be windows to the past, the future or even moments in the present that cannot be specified.”

Material Re-pose, 2017 In an accompanying essay historian Dorota Biczel draws attention to Awai's abrupt transformational shifts of image, patterning and materials within the same work. Awai's juxtaposition of the infinity of the black ooze, the suggested locality of the rendered skins of animals, as well as the here and now of her own figurative likeness continue her signature premise of the complexity of matter and historical narrative.

Persistent Resistance of the Liquid Land, 2018 In an installation inspired by a singular crouching black scout in a Brooklyn Civil War monument of otherwise standing group of white soldiers, “Persistent Resistance” consists of a central speckled, decorative column that looks like a Rorschach ink blot. Beneath it pooled on the floor, as if still in the process of cooling, is a pour of asphalt, resin, charcoal, nail polish over foam. Repeating butterfly-like paper shapes in dark blue, black, and gray hover around the column, often with a gray-tone image of the crouching soldier in the middle of them evoking cherubim or ethereal figures. Also in the same year, The New York Times asked artists to propose alternatives to Confederate monuments being removed from public spaces. Awai's proposal was inspired by the Grand Army Plaza memorial arch which is a tribute to fighters for the Union. Focusing on the African-American man who surveys and stands ready for battle, she creates a winged soldier waiting to do battle for a better future.

Envisioning the Liquid Land, 2019 A solo exhibition of painted relief works on paper. Purposely ambiguous spatial familiarities in multitude of parts combine into a complex mixture of visual and symbolic elements. Awai states “The history of the Americas is about malleability; the shaping and reshaping of resources and culture. It is an evolving, and revolving phenomena of transformation through the movement of bodies and materials,”
