= Polina V. Lishko =

Cellular and developmental biologist (born 1974)

- Поліна Валеріївна Лішко
- Born: 1974 (age 51–52); Kiev, Ukrainian SSR, Soviet Union (now Kyiv, Ukraine)
- Education: Bogomoletz Institute of Physiology
- Spouse: Yuriy Kirichok
- Awards: MacArthur Fellowship
- Scientific career
- Fields: Physiology
- Workplaces: UC Berkeley
- Doctoral advisor: Professor Oleg Alexandrovich Krishtal
- Other academic advisors: Professor Vadim Arshavsky and Professor Rachelle Gaudet
- Website: www.lishkolab.org

Polina Valeriivna Lishko (Note: Ukrainian: Поліна Валеріївна Лішко, romanized: Polina Valeriivna Lishko) (born 1974) is a Ukrainian-American cellular and developmental biologist. She was a 2015 Pew biomedical scholar. She is a 2020 MacArthur Fellow. She is currently an associate professor at the University of California, Berkeley as well as an adjunct professor at the Buck Institute for Research on Aging.

== Early life and education ==
Polina V. Lishko was born in Kiev, Ukrainian SSR, Soviet Union (now Kyiv, Ukraine) in 1974. Her parents were chemists who worked at Taras Shevchenko National University. In 1996, Lishko graduated with a Specialist degree from Taras Shevchenko National University. She completed her Ph.D. in 2000 under the supervision of Oleg Alexandrovich Krishtal at the Bogomoletz Institute of Physiology in Ukraine. At the Bogomoletz Institute of Physiology, she met Yuriy Kirichok, whom she would later marry.

== Career ==
After obtaining her Ph.D., Lishko was a postdoctoral fellow at Harvard University in the Rachelle Gaudet lab. From 2006 to 2011, she worked at the University of California, San Francisco. Since 2012, she has taught at the University of California, Berkeley and holds the position of associate professor.

She was the first person to successfully perform electrophysiology on human sperm. Her lab currently focuses on sperm ion channels, sperm mitochondrial uncoupling, steroid hormones and ovarian aging, and bioactive lipid signalling in the choroid plexus. In 2016, her lab discovered the mechanism for how progesterone activates spermatozoa through the protein ABHD2. In 2022 she was awarded the Senior Cranefield Award by The Journal of General Physiology and The Society of General Physiologists for her work on sex steroids on potassium channels.

In 2022, Lishko was named by Carnegie Corporation of New York as an honoree of the Great Immigrants Awards.
