= Anisa Ibrahim =

Somali-American doctor

- أنيسة إبراهيم
- Born: 1987 (age 38–39); Somalia
- Education: University of Washington School of Medicine
- Occupation: Pediatrician
- Employer: Harborview Medical Center's Pediatric Clinic
- Known for: First refugee appointed director of a U.S. clinic (Harborview Medical Center Pediatrics)
- Title: Director, Pediatric Clinic
- Awards: Carnegie Corporation of New York – Great Immigrants Award (2021)

Dr. Anisa Ibrahim (Somali: Anisa Ibrahim; Arabic: أنيسة إبراهيم) (born 1987) is a Somali-American doctor. She is the first refugee to be appointed director of a clinic, Harborview Medical Center's Pediatric Clinic in the United States.

== Early years and education ==
Ibrahim was born in Somalia. When she was five years old, she and her family fled from the civil war in Somalia in 1992 for Kenya. They spent a year in refugee camps in Kenya before relocating to the United States. In the United States, she and her siblings were treated at Harborview Medical Center's Pediatrics Clinic in Seattle.

== Education ==
Ibrahim trained as a doctor at the University of Washington School of Medicine.

== Career ==
After completing her training as a medical doctor in 2013, she did her internship and her residency at the University of Washington School of Medicine. In 2016 she joined Harborview Medical Center as a general pediatrician, the same hospital that treated her and her siblings about two decades prior. In 2019, she was appointed as director of the Harborview Medical Center, making her the first refugee to lead such a clinic in the United States. As part of her work at the clinic, she delivers outreach and care to immigrant and refugee populations, with a focus on those from East Africa.

== Personal life ==
Ibrahim is married with three children.

In 2021, Ibrahim was named by Carnegie Corporation of New York as an honoree of the Great Immigrants Award.
