= Hakki Akdeniz =

Kurdish pizza chef

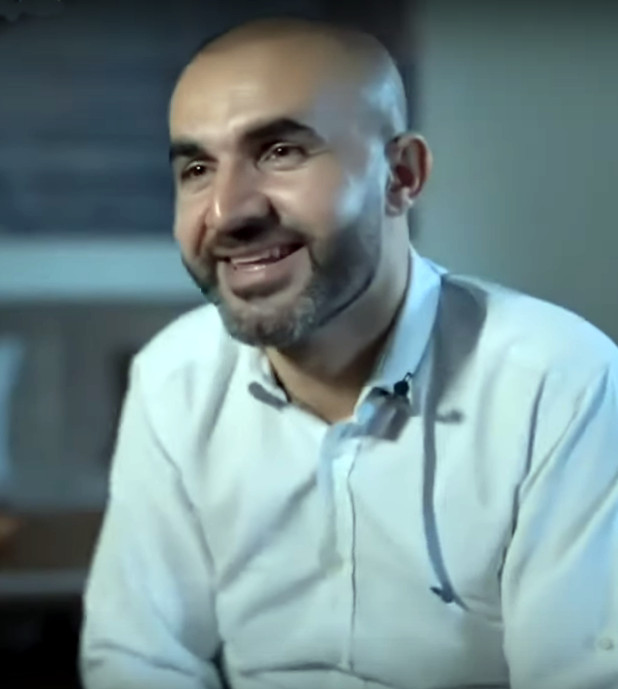
- Born: February 1, 1984 (age 42); Silvan, Diyarbakır, Turkey
- Occupations: Restaurateur, pizza chef

Hakki Akdeniz (born February 1, 1984) is an American restaurateur. He is owner and founder of the Champion Pizza pizzeria chain in New York City.

== Biography ==
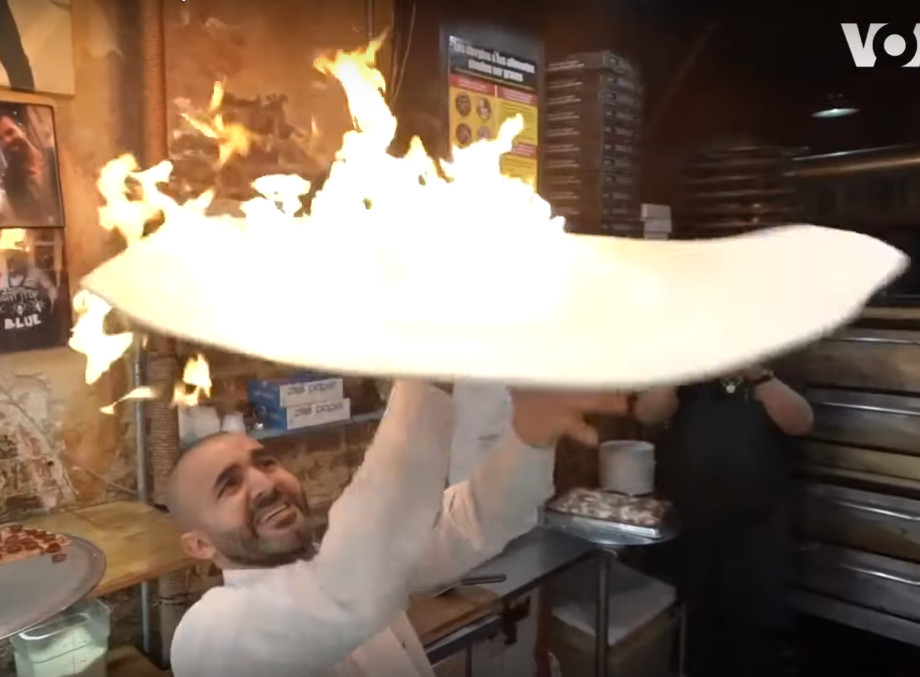
Hakki Akdeniz spinning a flaming pizza

Akdeniz was born in 1984 in Turkey to a large Kurdish family with sixteen other children. He worked in restaurants, learning to make lahmajoun flatbreads, before moving to Montreal, Canada in 1997 and working at his brother's pizzeria. In 2001, when his tourist visa expired and he was threatened with deportation, he moved to New York as an asylum-seeker. He planned to live with a friend, but became homeless when that arrangement fell through. He slept in a cheap hotel, in Grand Central Station, and in the Bowery Mission shelter for three months. He continued working in restaurants, washing dishes and then making pizzas, saving money to open his own restaurant. In 2009 he started his first pizza shop in lower Manhattan.

For years, Akdeniz entered pizza-making competitions, and in late 2010 he won the New York Pizza Showcase, performing tricks like spinning dough while it was on fire. He became the cover story of an issue of PMQ, a pizza magazine, which he distributed locally to promote his shop. Winning helped him to get an EB-1 green card and according to The New York Times, "he became something of a pizza celebrity, known for his flashy acrobatics in tossing and twirling dough, flaming or otherwise, and for building giant pizzas." He remained involved with homeless charities and activities, donating pizza and other services to shelters and other groups. In 2019, he received a Beacon Award from the Ellis Island Honors Society and American Immigrant Society, and in 2022 a Carnegie Corporation of New York Great Immigrant Award.

== Champion Pizza ==
Akdeniz opened his first pizzeria on Essex Street in Lower Manhattan at the end of 2009. The business struggled until he won the 2010 New York Pizza Showcase, receiving press attention. The nickname he received became the name of the pizzeria, Champion Pizza, and he made his story a prominent part of the business's identity. By 2024, there were 15 locations. As of 2024, locations are concentrated in New York City but include stores in Texas and Florida.

The pizza uses a thin crust and a variety of toppings, and is sold both through the pizzerias and frozen at retailers.
