= Simon Billinge =

American academic

- Education: University of Oxford
- Occupation: Researcher
- Employers: Brookhaven National Laboratory (2008–2022); Columbia University (2008–); Los Alamos National Laboratory (1992–1994); Michigan State University (1994–1999); Michigan State University (1999–2003); Michigan State University (2003–2007)
- Awards: Great Immigrants Award (2011); Bertram Eugene Warren Diffraction Physics Award (2018)

Simon J. L. Billinge is a professor of Materials Science and Applied Physics and Applied Mathematics at Columbia University, and a physicist at Brookhaven National Laboratory. He developed and applied techniques for studying local structure in materials using X-ray, neutron, and electron diffraction. His innovative work includes the development of novel data analysis methods incorporating graph theoretic, artificial intelligence, and machine learning approaches.

== Early life and education ==
Billinge earned his PhD in Materials Science and Engineering from the University of Pennsylvania in 1992.

== Career ==
After 13 years as a faculty member at Michigan State University, Billinge joined Columbia University and Brookhaven National Laboratory in 2008. His research focuses on the local structure of materials.

== Awards and honors ==
Billinge is a fellow of the American Physical Society and the Neutron Scattering Society of America. His accolades include the Fulbright and Sloan fellowships, the 2018 Warren Award of the American Crystallographic Association, the 2011 Carnegie Corporation of New York honor for contributions to the nation as an immigrant, the 2010 J.D. Hanawalt Award of the International Center for Diffraction Data, and several teaching and distinguished faculty awards at Michigan State University.
