= Elham Azizi =

Iranian-American computational biologist and biomedical engineer

- Born: 1986 (age 39–40); Tehran, Iran
- Citizenship: United States
- Education: Sharif University of Technology; Boston University
- Awards: Vilcek Prize for Creative Promise in Biomedical Science (2025); Takeda/NYAS Innovators in Science Award (2024); Allen Distinguished Investigator Award (2023)
- Scientific career
- Fields: Computational biology, Biomedical engineering, Machine learning, Cancer genomics
- Workplaces: Columbia University
- Thesis: Modeling gene regulatory networks through data integration (2014)
- Doctoral advisor: James Galagan
- Other academic advisors: Dana Pe'er
- Website: azizilab.com

Elham Azizi (Persian: الهام عزیزی; pronounced /ɛlˈhɑːm æˈziːzi/; born 1986) is an Iranian‑American computational biologist and biomedical engineer focused on cancer research. She holds the endowed Herbert & Florence Irving Associate Professorship of Cancer Data Research, and is an associate professor of biomedical engineering, at Columbia University. She is also affiliated with the Department of Computer Science, Irving Institute for Cancer Dynamics (IICD), Data Science Institute, and the Herbert Irving Comprehensive Cancer Center.

Azizi focuses on developing artificial intelligence and machine learning frameworks, alongside utilizing single‑cell genomic and imaging techniques to study cancer progression and immunotherapy response. Her awards include the Vilcek Prize for Creative Promise in Biomedical Science (2025) and the Takeda/NYAS Innovators in Science Award (2024).

== Early life and education ==
Azizi was born in Tehran, Iran, in 1986. As a high school student at Tehran Farzanegan School, she became the first Iranian recipient of the First Step to Nobel Prize in Physics, which was awarded for a two‑year experiment and statistical models of the trajectories of falling leaves. In 2008, she earned a B.S. in electrical engineering (signal processing) from the Sharif University of Technology. Afterwards, she immigrated to the United States, where she completed an M.S. in electrical engineering in 2010 and a PhD in bioinformatics at Boston University in 2014. Her thesis, supervised by James Galagan and in collaboration with Edoardo Airoldi, integrated gene‑regulatory network modelling with machine learning.

She conducted research in biomedical engineering at Boston University, in statistics at Harvard University, and computational cancer genomics at Microsoft Research. After this, she joined Columbia University as a postdoctoral research scientist under the mentorship of Dana Pe'er, an expert in computational biology, who transitioned to Memorial Sloan Kettering Cancer Center with her in 2016. In her postdoctoral research, Azizi introduced probabilistic modelling approaches to analyze single-cell genomic data, addressing statistical challenges arising from heterogeneous clinical datasets.

== Research ==
The Azizi Lab develops frameworks for machine learning, artificial intelligence, and statistics, to study the complex dynamics of tumor microenvironments. By integrating genomic, spatial, transcriptomic, and imaging data, Azizi's research investigates cancer progression, immune evasion, and therapeutic resistance.

The lab employs diverse computational techniques, including probabilistic models, deep generative models, attention-based architectures, causal discovery methods, diffusion, and foundation models.

Their deep generative model for integrating spatial transcriptomics with histological imaging characterizes spatial niches involving metabolic reprogramming and immune-suppressive environments in aggressive breast cancers, such as triple-negative and metaplastic breast cancers, and reports candidate therapeutic targets and biomarkers.

Computational modeling of tumour-immune interactions in patient specimens has demonstrated that cells driving the graft-versus-leukemia (GvL) effect in acute myeloid leukemia originate from the donor infusion, but their activation relies on a permissive and immunologically diverse bone marrow microenvironment, . The lab also employs computational models to further decouple environmental effects from tumor-intrinsic effects, for example, to quantify gene dosage effects on phenotypic plasticity and therapeutic resistance in melanoma patients undergoing immune checkpoint blockade therapy. These models have been used to reconstruct clonal evolution, and investigate genetic drivers of resistance.

The lab has also developed generative models to visualize and align diverging cell trajectories. This work has reported rare leukemia cell states and therapeutic targets linked to disrupted gene expression, with the potential to guide early detection of cancer.

== Awards and recognition ==
- Chan-Zuckerberg Initiative Science Leadership Award (2022)
- Allen Distinguished Investigator Award, Allen Institute (2023)
- Takeda and the New York Academy of Sciences Early-Career Innovator in Science Award in Cancer Immunology (2024)
- Vilcek Prize for Creative Promise in Biomedical Science (2025)

== Outreach and advocacy ==
In 2016, Azizi co‑founded the Workshop on Computational Biology held for 8 consecutive years at the International Conference on Machine Learning (ICML). She has also organized the IICD Intensive Workshop: Methods in Single-Cell Data Integration and Optimal Transport at Columbia University Irving Institute for Cancer Dynamics.

Azizi has spoken about the challenges she faced as an Iranian woman in science and her commitment to creating an inclusive environment for trainees. She has stated that "creative, collaborative and multidisciplinary scientific research demands talents from diverse backgrounds."

== Personal life ==
Azizi is married to computer scientist and entrepreneur Hossein Azari.

== See also ==
- List of Iranian Americans
- List of famous Iranian women
