= Nite Yun =

Cambodian American chef and restaurateur

- Born: 1982 (age 43–44); Khao-I-Dang Holding Center, Thailand
- Culinary career
- Cooking style: Cambodian cuisine
- Current restaurant: Lunette
- Previous restaurant: Nyum Bai (2018–2022)
- Award(s) won: Vilcek Prize for Creative Promise (2019) Great Immigrants Award (2019)

Nite Yun (Khmer: ណែត យុន; born 1982) is a Cambodian American chef and restaurateur. She is the owner of the Cambodian restaurant Lunette in the Ferry Building in San Francisco, California.

== Biography ==
Yun was born in September 1982 at the Khao-I-Dang Holding Center in Thailand. When she was two years old Yun's family was sponsored to go to Texas, but they decided to settle in Stockton, California instead, which was already home to a large Cambodian community. As a child Yun spent a lot of time in the kitchen helping her mother prepare food.

After graduating high school, she moved to San Francisco Bay Area at the age of 19 to study nursing at the San Francisco State University but dropped out during her senior year after realizing it wasn't her passion. Yun had been captivated by San Francisco's diverse food scene but she had also noticed how there were no good Cambodian restaurants. Being away from her family, Yun began learning Cambodian recipes from her mother over the phone and exploring her Cambodian roots. While eating kuyteav at a noodle stall in Phnom Penh during Yun's fifth trip to Cambodia, she had the idea of opening her own Cambodian food business.

In May 2014, Yun joined La Cocina's food entrepreneur incubator program. She earned her place in the program by serving the La Cocina's board of directors kuyteav, which later also became her restaurant's signature dish. Yun ran a pop-up restaurant in the Mission District and catered for private events before moving to a food stall in the Emeryville Public Market in February 2017.

=== Nyum Bai and breakthrough (2018–2022) ===
On 18 February 2018, after a successful Kickstarter campaign, Nyum Bai opened its first brick and mortar location at the former site of The Half Orange near Fruitvale station with an expanded menu.

The same year, Yun was named one of Eater's Young Guns and won the Eater Award as the Breakout Star of the Year, while her restaurant Nyum Bai was included in Food & Wine magazine's Biggest Restaurant Openings of 2018 list, Bon Appétit's America's Hot Ten: Best New Restaurants list, Eater's 18 Best New Restaurants in America list, Thrillist's Best New Restaurants of 2018 and San Francisco Chronicle's favorite new restaurants of the year list.

In 2019, Yun was named one of F&W Best New Chefs, included in the Time magazine's 100 Next List, and awarded the Vilcek Prize for Creative Promise in Culinary Arts, while Nyum Bai was included in Michelin Guide's Bib Gourmand Selection for San Francisco.

The Carnegie Corporation of New York honored Yun with 2019 Great Immigrant Award.

In May 2022, Nyum Bai was closed as its five-year lease near Fruitvale station came to an end. In August, Nyum Bai participated at the 2022 Outside Lands festival serving Cambodian stir-fried noodles and Khmer fried chicken.

=== Cookbook and new restaurant ===
In 2023, Yun revealed on her Instagram profile that together with writer Tien Nguyen she is working on a cookbook containing her Khmer recipes and the story of the Khmer Americans set to be released by the local imprint 4 Color Books.

In 2024, Nite was featured on Netflix's Chef's Table in an episode about noodles.

== Books ==
- Nite Yun, Tien Nguyen (2025). My Cambodia: A Khmer Cookbook. 4 Color Books. ISBN 978-1-984-86337-9
