= Marica Vilcek =

American art historian (1936–2026)

- Born: October 13, 1936; Ivanka pri Dunaji, Czechoslovakia
- Died: March 23, 2026 (aged 89); New York City, U.S.
- Occupation: Art historian
- Spouse: Jan Vilcek
- Parent(s): Dezider Gerháth (father) and Maria Hamosova (mother)

Marica Vilcek (October 13, 1936 – March 23, 2026) was an American art historian and philanthropist. She worked with museums and arts institutions in both Czechoslovakia and the United States, and was known for working with the Metropolitan Museum of Art, the New York University Institute of Fine Arts, and the Vilcek Foundation, and for her philanthropic work on the boards of the New York Youth Symphony and the Foundation for a Civil Society.

== Early life and career ==
On October 13, 1936, Marica Vilcek (née Gerháth) was born to parents Dezider Gerháth and Maria Hamosova in Ivanka pri Dunaji in Czechoslovakia. She was the second of three children in the family, with one older and one younger brother.

In the late 1950s, Marica enrolled at Comenius University in Bratislava, where she earned the degrees in art history. Following her graduation from Comenius University, Marica pursued a doctorate in art history at Charles University in Prague. She also began work at the Slovak National Gallery, where she was promoted to assistant curator. She was interested in modernist art, and by art that was created by artists in protest of the Communist regime, while also abiding by the professional and national standards of art set by the government as was dictated by the National Gallery.

In 1961, she was introduced to Jan Vilček by mutual friends, at an Easter party. In Love and Science: A Memoir, Jan recalls being impressed with her work at the Slovak National Gallery. In November 1961, Jan visited the gallery and asked her for a date. Their relationship progressed swiftly, and the pair were wed in a small civil ceremony in Bratislava in July 1962.

In 1964, Marica and Jan Vilcek were granted permission to visit friends in Vienna and made the decision to defect from communist Czechoslovakia. With two suitcases of belongings, they drove to Vienna, Austria, and then on to Frankfurt in West Germany to apply for refugee status and to pursue visas and careers in the United States. In 1965, the Vilceks immigrated to the United States, traveling to New York, where Jan had been offered a position as a research professor at New York University.

== New York, 1965–2000 ==
In New York, Vilcek began volunteering with the library of the Brooklyn Museum, to build a career in art history in the United States. In 1965, she was hired as a cataloguer in the Office of the Registrar and Catalogue Department at the Metropolitan Museum of Art; from 1974 to 1996 she was associate curator in charge of the Accessions and Catalogue Department, responsible for the museum's collections management as well as processing new acquisitions.

At the Metropolitan Museum of Art, Vilcek mentored art historians, arts management professionals and scholars, working with the museum's internship programs, and developing connections with the New York University Institute of Fine Arts. It was in this capacity that she first met Rick Kinsel, who would partner with Marica and Jan to develop the Vilcek Foundation.

== Death ==
Vilcek died on March 23, 2026, at the age of 89.

== Honors and awards ==
In 2005, Marica and Jan Vilcek were named Humanitarians of the Year by the Crohn's and Colitis Foundation of America, and in 2011 they were honored with the Outstanding New Yorker award given by the Center for an Urban Future in New York City. In 2012, Marica received the Stephen K. Fischel Distinguished Public Service Award from the American Immigration Council in Washington, DC, and accepted it on behalf of the Vilcek Foundation. In 2017, Marica and Jan were honored by the New York Landmarks Conservancy at the conservancy's 2017 Living Landmarks Celebration. In 2021, the New York University Institute of Fine Arts renamed the Great Hall of the James B. Duke House in Vilcek's honor.
