= Karen Lozano =

Researcher and academic

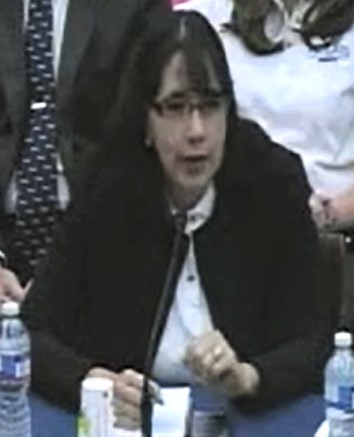
- Lozano testifies at the United States House Committee on Science, Space, and Technology in 2011
- Education: University of Monterrey; Rice University
- Awards: Elected Fellow of the National Academy of Inventors; Elected Fellow of the National Academy of Engineering; Emmy Award
- Scientific career
- Workplaces: University of Texas–Pan American; University of Texas System; Rice University
- Theses: Rheological Analysis of C60 solutions (1996); Development and characterization of a nanofiber-reinforced thermoplastic composite (1999)
- Doctoral advisor: Enrique Barrera

Karen Lozano is a Mexican-American researcher who is the department chair and Trustee Professor of Materials Science & NanoEngineering at Rice University. She studies carbon nanofiber-reinforced thermoplastic composites. She was elected Fellow of the National Academy of Inventors in 2020 and the National Academy of Engineering in 2023.

== Early life and education ==
Lozano was born in Mexico. Her mother was a seamstress. She studied mechanical engineering at the University of Monterrey and the year she graduated, she was the only woman to earn a degree in mechanical engineering. Researchers from Rice University visited Monterrey as part of an outreach project, and recruited Lozano to join for a doctoral position. She was the first Latin American woman to earn a PhD from Rice University.

== Research and career ==
Lozano joined the faculty at the University of Texas–Pan American (now University of Texas Rio Grande Valley), where she worked on new approach to mass-produce nano nanofibers. In 2009 she launched FibeRio, a company that could mass-produce nanofibers through a clean, cheap, and facile process coined Forcespinning. Fiberio makes use of Cyclone ForceSpinning Systems, which uses centrifugal forces to pull nanofibers for industrial and medical applications. She took part in a roundtable discussion with Barack Obama about entrepreneurs in the United States in 2013.

In 2009, Lozano was awarded a National Science Foundation (NSF) award to build a partnership between the University of Texas Rio Grande Valley and University of Minnesota to create a materials science research center. The center looks to train undergraduate and graduate students from Hispanic backgrounds to pursue careers in materials science.

In 2022, Lozano and her team received a Lone Star Emmy Award for their work on the educational program Energía y Tú, which focuses on energy topics and sustainability.

In 2023, Lozano, University of Texas Rio Grande Valley professor of Mechanical Engineering and Julia Beecherl Endowed Professor, was elected into the prestigious National Academy of Engineering (NAE). She is the first UTRGV professor ever to receive this honor and one of only three Texans in this year’s cohort of electees. The academy cited her “contributions to nanofiber research and commercialization and mentoring of undergraduate students from underserved populations.”

Lozano became the Chair of the Department of Materials Science and NanoEngineering at Rice University on January 1, 2025, succeeding Pulickel Ajayan.

== Awards and honors ==
- 2002 Most Promising Scientist Award Hispanic Engineer National Achievement Association Conference
- 2011 University of Texas System Regents Teaching Award
- 2015 Engineer of the Year by Great Minds in STEM (Science, Technology, Engineering and Mathematics).
- 2017 Universidad de Monterrey Historias de Exito(Alumni Success Stories).
- 2017 Insight Into Diversity Inspiring Leaders in STEM Award.
- 2017 The University of Texas Rio Grande Valley Research Excellence Award.
- 2018 American Association of Hispanics in higher education Outstanding Research Award.
- 2018 Mexicanos Distinguidos Medal
- 2018 Latina of Influence
- 2019 Presidential Award for Excellence in Science, Mathematics, and Engineering Mentoring
- 2020 Elected to the National Academy of Inventors
- 2023 Elected to the National Academy of Engineering
- 2023 Honored with the Carnegie Corporation of New York's Great Immigrant Award.

== Selected publications ==
- Villarreal, A.; Barbosa, R.; Bose, S.; Srivastava, B.; Padilla, V.; Lozano, K. (2022). "Color tunable aerogels/sponge-like structures developed from fine fiber membranes". Mater Adv. 3 (6): 2716–2725. doi:10.1039/D1MA00946J.
- Rodriguez, C.; Padilla, V.; Lozano, K.; Ahmad, F.; Chapa, A.; Mcdonald, A.; Materon, L.; Gilkerson, R. (2021). "Cell proliferative properties of Forcespinning® nopal composite nanofibers". Journal of Bioactive and Compatible Polymers. 37 (1): 28–37. doi:10.1177/08839115211060404.
- Sarkal, K.; Gomez, C.; Zambrano, S.; Ramirez, M.; de Hoyos, E.; Vasquez, H.; Lozano, K. (2010). "Electrospinning to Forcespinning™". Materials Today. 13 (11): 12–14. doi:10.1016/S1369-7021(10)70199-1. ISSN 1369-7021.
- Zhu, J.; Peng, H.; Rodriguez-Macias, F.; Margrave, J. L.; Khabashesku, V. N.; Imam, A. M.; Lozano, K.; Barrera, E. V. (2004). "Reinforcing Epoxy Polymer Composites Through Covalent Integration of Functionalized Nanotubes". Advanced Functional Materials. 14 (7): 643–648. doi:10.1002/adfm.200305162. ISSN 1616-301X. S2CID 93699161.
- Shofner, M. L.; Lozano, K.; Rodríguez-Macías, F. J.; Barrera, E. V. (2003-06-27). "Nanofiber-reinforced polymers prepared by fused deposition modeling". Journal of Applied Polymer Science. 89 (11): 3081–3090. Bibcode:2003JAPS...89.3081S. doi:10.1002/app.12496. ISSN 0021-8995.
- Lozano, K.; Barrera, E. V. (2000). "Nanofiber-reinforced thermoplastic composites. I. Thermoanalytical and mechanical analyses". Journal of Applied Polymer Science. 79 (1): 125–133. doi:10.1002/1097-4628(20010103)79:1<125::aid-app150>3.0.co;2-d. ISSN 0021-8995.
