= Julissa Arce =

American writer and advocate for immigration rights

Julissa Natzely Arce Raya is a Mexican-American writer, speaker, businesswoman, and advocate for immigration rights. She is the co-founder of Ascend Educational Fund (AEF) and the author of My (Underground) American Dream (2016), Someone Like Me (2018), and “You Sound Like a White Girl” (2022).

== Early life and education ==
Arce was born in Guerrero, Mexico. Her parents migrated to the United States for work, after which she began using a travel visa at age 11 to move between her parents' home in San Antonio and her grandmother's home in Mexico. At age 14, she remained in the United States after her visa expired making her undocumented. She remained undocumented for nearly 15 years.

Arce was able to attend college through the Texas DREAM act. She obtained a degree in finance from the University of Texas, Austin.

== Career and advocacy ==
In 2005, Arce moved to New York to start an internship at Goldman Sachs. Within seven years, she was a Vice President at the company. She left Goldman Sachs for Merrill Lynch in 2011.

Arce obtained a green card in 2009 after marrying and became a United States citizen on August 8, 2014. She shared her immigration story in a 2015 Bloomberg interview.

Arce is co-founder of the Ascend Educational Fund (AEF), a college scholarship and mentorship program for immigrant students regardless of their immigration status. The organization has awarded over $500,000 in scholarships since 2012.

Arce has authored two books about her immigrant experience; "My (Underground) American Dream" (2016), and "Someone Like Me" (2018). Her most recent book is “You Sound Like a White Girl” (2022).

Arce was named as one of People en Español’s 25 Most Powerful Women of 2017 and 2018 Woman of the Year by the City of Los Angeles. She was awarded the Los Angeles Times Latinos de Hoy Emerging Leader Award, the NAHREP's Vanguard Award, and the Hispanic Heritage Foundation Inspira Award.

== Personal life ==
Arce lives in Los Angeles with her husband.
