= Iman Abuzeid =

American doctor and entrepreneur

- Born: Saudi Arabia
- Education: University College London (MD); Wharton School (MBA)
- Occupations: Physician, businesswoman
- Employer: Incredible Health

Iman Abuzeid is a Sudanese-American physician and entrepreneur. She is the co-founder and CEO of Incredible Health, a digital nurse hiring platform.

== Early life and education ==
Abuzeid was born to Sudanese parents in Saudi Arabia, where her father, an otolaryngologist surgeon, was working. Abuzeid earned undergraduate and medical degrees from University College London, then moved to the United States to work in healthcare consulting.

She attended the Wharton School, where she earned an MBA, and worked for the consulting company McKinsey & Company.

== Career ==
Abuzeid is the co-founder and CEO of Incredible Health, a digital nurse hiring platform. She is one of only a few black female founders to lead a company worth more than $1 billion. In 2024 she was selected by Forbes as one of America's self-made women with a net worth of $350 million.
