= Pierre Terjanian =

French curator

Pierre Terjanian (born in Strasbourg, France) is the Ann and Graham Gund Director and CEO of the Museum of Fine Arts, Boston. Before his appointment as director, Terjanian served as the chief of curatorial affairs and conservation since 2024. He is also a Curator Emeritus at the Metropolitan Museum of Art in New York City, having previously been appointed Arthur Ochs Sulzberger Curator in Charge of The Met's Department of Arms and Armor. Terjanian has a graduate degree in history from the Université de Metz. Prior to his tenure at the Metropolitan Museum of Art (which he joined in 2012), he held the dual role of J. J. Medveckis Associate Curator of Arms and Armor and acting head of the Department of European Decorative Arts and Sculpture before 1700 at the Philadelphia Museum of Art.

Terjanian is the author of The Last Knight: The Art, Armor, and Ambition of Maximilian I which accompanied and augmented the exhibition he curated at the Metropolitan Museum of Art and Princely Armor in the Age of Dürer: A Renaissance Masterpiece at the Philadelphia Museum of Art".

In 2018 and 2019 Terjanian arranged a series of live events where hip hop dancers from New York City dance collective It's Showtime NYC—founded and sponsored by the South Bronx located non-profit "Dancing in the Streets"—performed in replica armor in the Emma and Georgina Bloomberg Arms and Armor Court at the Metropolitan Museum of Art.

Terjanian succeeded Matthew Teitelbaum as director of the MFA Boston, assuming the position in July 2025.
