= Jan Vilček =

Slovak-American immunologist (born 1933)

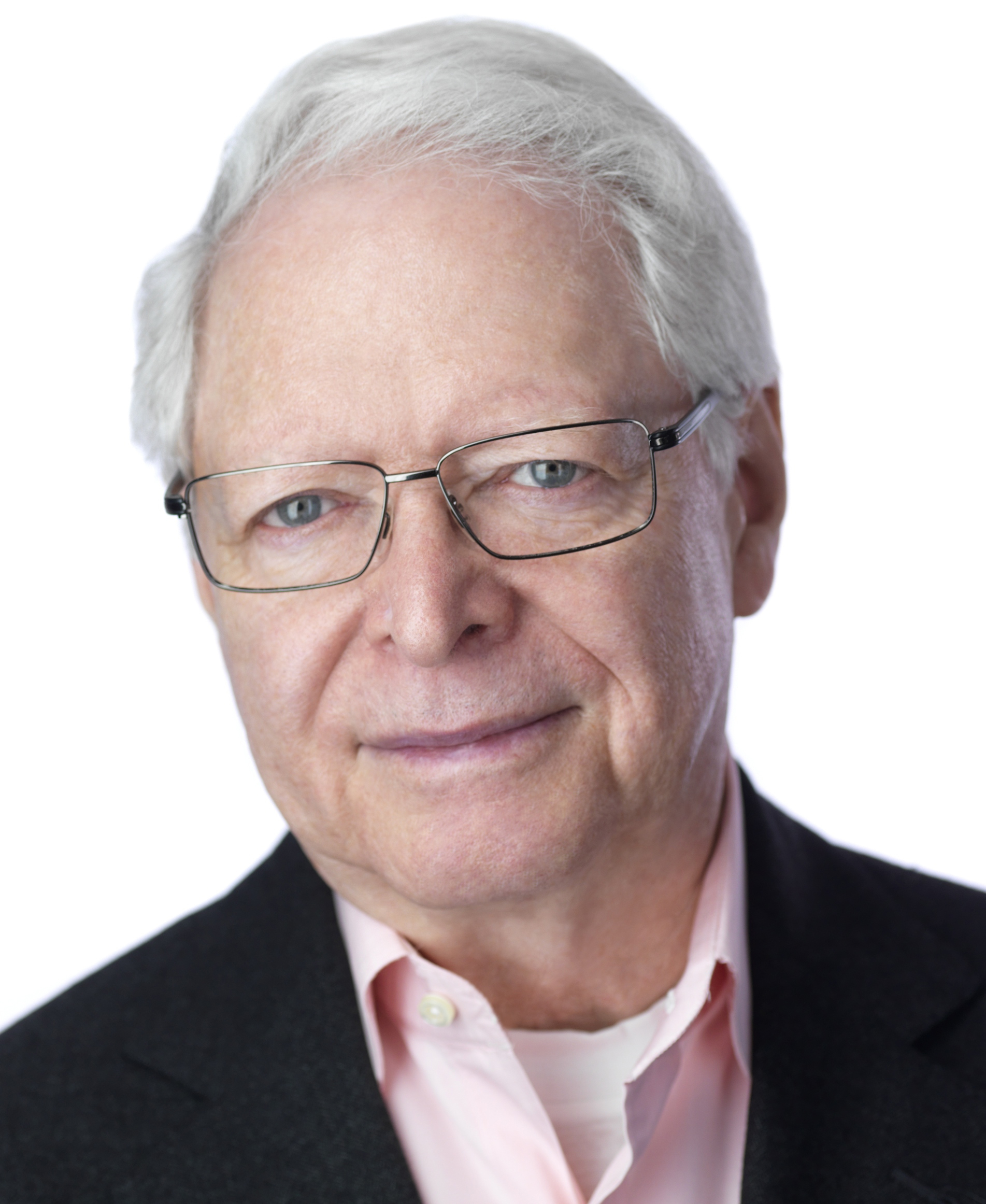
- Jan Vilček in 2014
- Born: June 17, 1933 (age 93); Bratislava, Czechoslovakia
- Education: Comenius University in Bratislava
- Spouse: Marica Vilcek
- Awards: National Medal of Technology and Innovation (2012)
- Scientific career
- Fields: microbiology, immunology
- Workplaces: Czechoslovak Academy of Sciences; New York University School of Medicine
- Website: www.janvilcek.com

Jan T. Vilček (born June 17, 1933) is a Slovak biomedical scientist, educator, inventor and philanthropist working and living in US. He is a professor in the department of microbiology at the New York University School of Medicine, and chairman and CEO of The Vilcek Foundation. Vilček received his M.D. degree from Comenius University Medical School in Bratislava in 1957; and his Ph.D. in Virology from the Institute of Virology, Czechoslovak Academy of Sciences, Bratislava, in 1962.

In 1964, Vilček with his wife Marica defected from Communist Czechoslovakia during a three-day visit to Vienna. In 1965, the Vilčeks immigrated to the United States, and have since lived in New York City. Vilček devoted his scientific career to studies of soluble mediators that regulate the immune system (cytokines), including interferon and tumor necrosis factor (TNF).

== Early years ==
Vilček was born in Bratislava, Czechoslovakia, to a middle class secular Jewish family. His mother, Friderika Fischer, was born to a German-speaking family in Budapest, Hungary. She moved with her family to Bratislava where she finished medical school, married Jan's father, Julius Vilček, and became an ophthalmologist. Jan grew up speaking three languages (Slovak, German and Hungarian). During World War II, his family was persecuted because of their Jewish heritage. To protect him from deportation to a concentration camp, in 1942 his parents placed Jan in an orphanage run by Catholic nuns. From mid-1944 through the end of the war in 1945, Vilček and his mother were hidden by a Slovak family in a remote village, while his father joined an uprising against the Nazis. After the defeat of Nazi Germany the family was reunited and moved back to Bratislava.

== Career and scientific contributions ==
Vilček became interested in research in microbiology and immunology during his medical studies. Upon completing medical school in 1957, Vilček joined the Institute of Virology, Czechoslovak Academy of Sciences in Bratislava as a research scientist. There, in 1959, he embarked on studies of interferon, a protein made in response to infection with viruses and other pathogens. At the time, interferon was still a poorly defined protein studied by only a handful of scientists across the world. In 1964, Vilček organized the first international conference on interferon that was attended by many scientists active in the field at the time. Upon emigrating to the United States in 1965, Vilček joined the faculty of NYU School of Medicine as an assistant professor of microbiology. At NYU, Vilček continued research on interferon. He helped to develop methods for the production of human fibroblast (beta) interferon that enabled its clinical utilization and molecular characterization. He and his colleagues showed that human leukocyte (alpha) and beta interferon are antigenically distinct, laying the groundwork for the later demonstration that these interferons are encoded by distinct genes that belong to the same gene family. He and his coworkers also contributed to the characterization of human immune (gamma) interferon. In the 1980s Vilček became interested in the study of another cytokine, termed tumor necrosis factor (TNF). His work helped to elucidate novel biological actions of TNF, led to the discovery of novel genes and proteins, and helped to identify signaling pathways.

Over the span of his career, Vilček published over 350 papers in scientific journals. Vilček is an Institute for Scientific Information highly cited researcher in the Immunology category. He is listed as an inventor on over 40 US patents.

== Contributions to drug development ==
In the 1970s Vilček and colleagues developed methods for the production of human interferon-beta in cultures of human diploid fibroblasts. These methods made it possible to produce natural human interferon-beta for clinical trials. Interferon-beta produced by these methods was licensed for clinical use in multiple sclerosis and some other diseases in Germany and in Japan, but eventually the production of natural interferon has been replaced by more efficient methods utilizing recombinant DNA technology.

In 1989 Vilček and NYU colleague, Junming Le, created a monoclonal antibody against TNF-alpha, a powerful promoter of inflammation. TNF-alpha is involved in the pathogenesis of numerous chronic inflammatory autoimmune diseases. Collaborating with the biotechnology company Centocor, founded by Michael Wall and Hubert Schoemaker (later acquired by Johnson & Johnson and recently renamed Janssen Biotech, Inc.), Vilček and Le helped to develop the biologic drug initially termed cA2, which is now known commercially as infliximab, or Remicade. Remicade is a potent anti-inflammatory agent used in the treatment of rheumatoid arthritis, Crohn's disease, ulcerative colitis, ankylosing spondylitis, psoriatic arthritis, plaque psoriasis and other inflammatory diseases.

Remicade was the first TNF blocking agent successfully used in patients. The success of Remicade spurred the development and regulatory approval of several other anti-TNF agents (TNF inhibitor), including adalimumab-Humira, etanercept-Enbrel, golimumab-Simponi, and certolizumab pegol-Cimzia, all of which are being used to treat numerous inflammatory autoimmune diseases. It is estimated that close to 3 million patients have been treated with Remicade, and more patients benefited from treatments with other anti-TNF agents.

== Philanthropy ==
With the royalties from the sales of Remicade, Vilček and his wife Marica established the Vilcek Foundation in 2000, devoted to increasing public awareness of the contribution of immigrants to professional, academic and artistic life in the United States. The foundation fulfills its mission by awarding annual Vilcek Prizes in biomedical science and the arts, sponsoring cultural programs, and hosting immigrant artists in its gallery space in New York City.

In 2005, the Vilčeks made a donation to NYU School of Medicine valued at over 100 million dollars, for use towards basic research. The funds have been used for the establishment of several endowed professorships, renovation of laboratories, establishment of research programs and endowment of fellowships for graduate students and postdoctoral fellows at NYU School of Medicine.

In a separate donation announced in late 2010, the Vilčeks contributed over 21 million dollars for the renovation of a dormitory for medical students and the establishment of endowed merit scholarships for medical students.

Vilček's memoir, Love and Science, was published by Seven Stories Press in 2016. An audiobook version of Love and Science was released in March 2021. The audiobook is narrated by Daniel K. Isaac.

Vilček's wife, Marica Vilcek, an art historian, endowed two curatorships in the American Wing of the Metropolitan Museum of Art. Jan Vilček is a member of the board of trustees of the NYU Langone Medical Center.

== Awards and honors ==
- Fellow of the National Academy of Inventors, 2016
- Doctor of Humane Letters, honoris causa, Graduate Center, City University of New York, 2014
- National Medal of Technology and Innovation, awarded by President Barack Obama, 2013
