= Viviana Gradinaru =

American neuroscientist and biomedical engineer

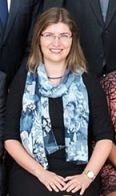
- Gradinaru among recipients of the Presidential Early Career Award for Scientists and Engineers (PECASE) in 2016
- Born: Vaslui, Romania
- Education: Stanford University (PhD); California Institute of Technology (BS); University of Bucharest
- Awards: Vilcek Prize
- Scientific career
- Workplaces: California Institute of Technology; Circuit Therapeutics
- Thesis: Mechanisms of deep brain stimulation revealed by optogenetic deconstruction of diseased brain circuitry (2010)
- Doctoral advisor: Karl Deisseroth

Viviana Grădinaru is a Romanian-American neuroscientist who is a professor of neuroscience and biological engineering at the California Institute of Technology. She develops neurotechnologies, including optogenetics CLARITY tissue clearing, and gene delivery vectors. She has been awarded the Presidential Early Career Award for Scientists and Engineers and the National Institutes of Health Director's Pioneer Award. In 2019 she was a finalist for the Blavatnik Awards for Young Scientists. In 2020 she was awarded a Vilcek Prize for Creative Promise in Biomedical Science by the Vilcek Foundation.

== Early life and education ==
Gradinaru is a native of Vaslui, Romania, and grew up with her grandparents in a small village. As a native of Eastern Europe, Gradinaru was encouraged to study science from a young age, and took part in science olympiads. She has said that she benefitted from the many "brilliant women teaching and practicing science in my home country". Gradinaru eventually studied physics at the University of Bucharest. After two years, she moved to the California Institute of Technology and graduated in biology in 2005. During her undergraduate studies, she became fascinated by neurodegeneration. She moved to Stanford University for her doctoral studies, where she specialized in neuroscience performing research with Karl Deisseroth. During her PhD, she taught summer courses at Cold Spring Harbor Laboratory and trained researchers for the Stanford Optogenetics Innovation Laboratory. She took part in ballroom dancing and competed in quickstep at an amateur level throughout graduate school.

== Research and career ==
In collaboration with her colleagues at Stanford, Gradinaru founded Circuit Therapeutics, serving as the chief technology officer and creating optogenetic therapies to treat people with disorders of the nervous system. Gradinaru joined the faculty at the California Institute of Technology, as an assistant professor in 2012 and was promoted to full professor in 2018. Since 2013, she has served as the Principal Investigator of the CLARITY, Optogenetics and Vector Engineering Research (CLOVER) Center at the California Institute of Technology.

Gradinaru has worked on the development of novel technologies for brain imaging, which she uses to understand sleep disorders and movement. These technologies include optogenetics and CLARITY. She developed viral vector screening methods to create gene delivery vehicles that can cross the blood–brain barrier. Optogenetics make use of light and photosensitive proteins to manipulate the function of cells that live within heterogenous body tissue.

She looks to use her understanding of neuronal activity to establish the mechanism of action of deep brain stimulation (DBS). In particular, she has used optogenetics to study the brain circuitry involved with Parkinson's disease. Using CLARITY, Gradinaru looks to create anatomical maps of intact brain networks and biological systems. In 2019, Gradinaru was part of a research team that demonstrated that zebrafish and mice need serotonin to sleep.

== Awards and honours ==
- 2013 World Economic Forum Young Scientist
- 2013 Pew Scholar
- 2014 Cell's 40 Under 40
- 2017 Takeda Pharmaceutical Company – New York Academy of Sciences Innovators in Science Award
- 2018 The Gill Center for Biomolecular Science at Indiana University Transformative Investigator Award
- 2018 National Institutes of Health Director's Pioneer Award
- 2019 Blavatnik Awards for Young Scientists Finalist
- 2020 Vilcek Prize for Creative Promise in Biomedical Science, Vilcek Foundation

== Publications ==
- Gradinaru, Viviana (26 December 2007). "Targeting and Readout Strategies for Fast Optical Neural Control In Vitro and In Vivo". Journal of Neuroscience. 27 (52): 14231–14238. doi:10.1523/JNEUROSCI.3578-07.2007. PMC 6673457. PMID 18160630.
- Gradinaru, Viviana (17 April 2009). "Optical Deconstruction of Parkinsonian Neural Circuitry". Science. 324 (5925): 354–359. Bibcode:2009Sci...324..354G. doi:10.1126/science.1167093. PMC 6744370. PMID 19299587.
- Gradinaru, Viviana (2 April 2010). "Molecular and Cellular Approaches for Diversifying and Extending Optogenetics". Cell. 141 (1): 22–24. doi:10.1016/j.cell.2010.02.037. PMC 4160532. PMID 20303157.
