= Joanna Wysocka =

Polish-born biologist

Joanna Krystyna Wysocka is a biologist, a professor at Stanford University, and a Howard Hughes Medical Institute Investigator. She specializes in chemical and systems biology as well as developmental biology.

Wysocka was elected to the American Academy of Arts and Sciences in 2018, as a European Molecular Biology Organization international member in 2019, and the National Academy of Sciences in 2024.

== Early life and education ==
Wysocka was born in Poland. She finished high school in Łódź. When she was in university, she spent a summer working with molecular biologist Winship Herr at Cold Spring Harbor Laboratory and was invited back to do her Ph.D. In 1998, she earned her M.Sc. from Warsaw University in molecular biology and moved to the United States for her Ph.D. in biochemistry from Institute of Biochemistry and Biophysics Polish Academy of Sciences (Instytut Biochemii i Biofizyki Polskiej Akademii Nauk) and Cold Spring Harbor Laboratory. In 2006, she completed a postdoctoral fellowship with David Allis at Rockefeller University, specializing in chromatin biology. During her postdoc, she discovered the structural fold in human proteins known as PHD fingers.

== Research ==
Wysocka's research focuses on understanding mechanisms of gene regulation. Some of her most notable scientific contributions include the discovery of chromatin signatures in primed enhancer elements. Her group has also developed new tools for visualizing regulatory regions in living cells. Her research has provided insight into how gene expression influences evolution, genomic variation and diseases.

== Awards and honors ==
- Momentum Award, the International Society for Stem Cell Research (2022)
- Valkhof Chair Award, Radboud University Nijmegen, the Netherlands (2017)
- Investigator Award, Howard Hughes Medical Institute (2015)
- Vilcek Prize for Creative Promise (2013)
- Harland Winfield Mossman Award in Developmental Biology, American Association of Anatomists (2013)
- California Institute for Regenerative Medicine Basic Biology Awards (2011)
- Outstanding Young Investigator Award, the International Society for Stem Cell Research (2010)
- W. M. Keck Distinguished Young Scholar in Medical Research Award (2008–2013)
- California Institute for Regenerative Medicine New Faculty Award (2008–2013)
- Searle Scholar Award (2007–2010)
- Baxter Foundation Award (2007)
