= Hiroshi Motomura =

Susan Westerberg Prager Professor of Law at the UCLA School of Law

- Scientific career
- Fields: immigration law
- Workplaces: UCLA School of Law

Hiroshi Motomura (born 1953) is the Susan Westerberg Prager Professor of Law at the UCLA School of Law. He is a leading scholar of American immigration and citizenship law.

== Awards ==
- 2006 PSP Award for Excellence, Law & Legal Studies from the Association of American Publishers for Americans in Waiting
- Guggenheim Fellowship (April 2017)

== Works ==
- Americans in Waiting: The Lost Story of Immigration and Citizenship in the United States. Oxford University Press, 2006. ISBN 9780195336085
- Immigration and Citizenship: Process and Policy (8th ed.) West Academic Publishing, 2016. ISBN 9781634599283
- Forced Migration: Law and Policy (2d ed.) West Academic Publishing, 2013. ISBN 9780314285331
- Immigration Outside the Law Oxford University Press, 2014. ISBN 978-0199768431
