= Tolić (surname) =

Tolić is a Croatian and Bosnian surname. People with the surname include:

- Iva Tolić, a Croatian agricultural biologist
- Dubravka Oraić Tolić, a Croatian poet
- Igor Tolić, a Bosnian football manager
- Marko Tolić, a Croatian footballer

== See also ==
- Tolić (disambiguation)
