= Faculty of Science, University of Zagreb =

Faculty of the University of Zagreb, Croatia

Faculty of Science University of Zagreb
- Prirodoslovno-matematički fakultet Sveučilišta u Zagrebu
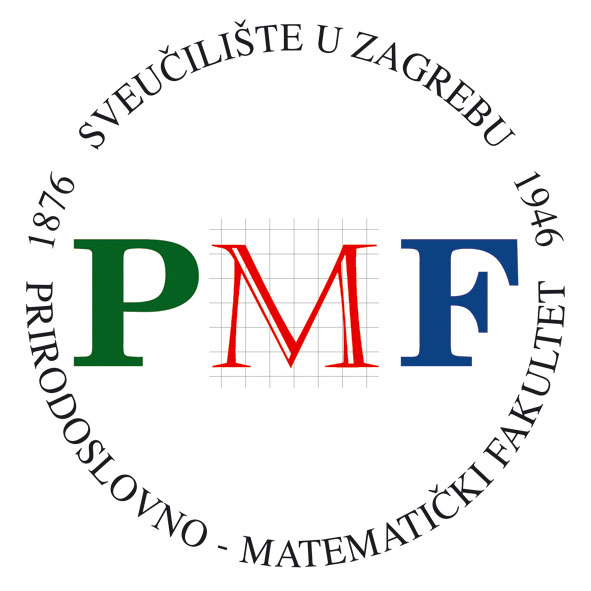
- Latin: Facultas Scientiarum Naturalium et Mathematicarum
- Other name: PMF
- Type: Public
- Established: 8 June 1946
- Dean: Ivančica Ternjej
- Faculty: 468
- Students: c. 6,000
- Location: Zagreb, Croatia
- Campus: Horvatovac
- Website: www.pmf.unizg.hr/en

Faculty of Science (Croatian: Prirodoslovno-matematički fakultet, (Note: lit. the Faculty of natural sciences and mathematics) abbr: PMF) is a faculty of the University of Zagreb that comprises seven departments - biology, physics, chemistry, mathematics, geophysics, geography and geology. The Faculty has 288 full professors, associate and assistant professors, 180 junior researchers and about 6000 students.

The Faculty of Science was formally established in 1946, although the teaching of these subjects had existed in the university since 1876. The Faculty offers undergraduate, graduate, and postgraduate study programmes, and pursues research in the fields of natural sciences and mathematics. It also encompasses the seismological service, the mareographic and meteorological stations, and the Zagreb Botanical Garden.

The Faculty of Science is engaged in excellent cooperation with numerous universities and institutes abroad. Professors of the Faculty have been invited as visiting lecturers to European and American universities, and young staff members, as well as postgraduate students, are regularly sent to international universities and institutes for further research.

== History ==
On 23 September 1669. Leopold I certified at the Jesuit Neoacademica Zagrebiensis, a three-year higher education institution, which gradually developed the studies of Philosophy, Law and Theology. At the Jesuit School philosophy was taught even earlier, and part of its first year studies were logic, physics, and metaphysics. Neither Jesuit School (until 1773), nor royal Regia Scientiarum Academica (until 1850) represented a today's concept of university. Croatian Parliament and Franz Joseph I of Austria, introduced the Law on founding the University of Zagreb. Soon after the establishing of the University of Zagreb, Faculties of Law, Theology and Philosophy started operating. The Chairs of the Faculty of Philosophy were appointed gradually. In the field of natural sciences the teaching started in 1876, with first lectures in mineralogy and geology, and then in botany, physics, mathematics, chemistry and zoology and geography. Dr. Fran Tućan (1878–1954), a popularizer of science in Croatia, who was also president of Matica hrvatska, was appointed as the first dean of the Faculty of Science.

A long endeavour of the Science Department of the Faculty of Philosophy to attain the status of Faculty, finally materialized in 1946, when the Faculty of Science was established.

== Departments ==
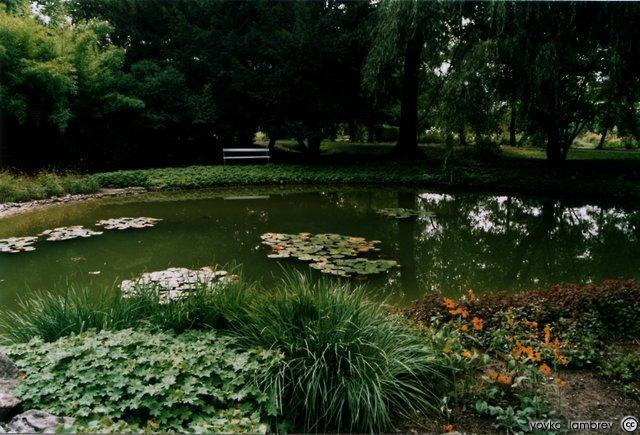
Zagreb Botanical Garden founded in 1889 by Antun Heinz is part of the Faculty

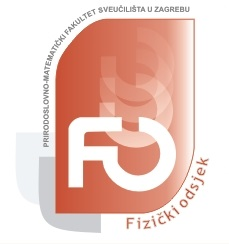

The Faculty consists of following departments:

- Department of Biology (Biološki odsjek)
- Department of Physics (Fizički odsjek)
- Department of Chemistry (Kemijski odsjek)
- Department of Mathematics (Matematički odsjek)
- Department of Geophysics (Geofizički odsjek)
- Department of Geography (Geografski odsjek)
- Department of Geology (Geološki odsjek)

=== Department of Geography ===
Department of Geography at the Faculty of Science in Zagreb is the oldest and the biggest geographic department in Croatia. The Department of Geography consists of three divisions: physical geography, human geography, and regional geography and teaching methods. The Cartographic-technical Centre with a rich Cartographic Collection and the Central Geographic Library are also part of the department. It was founded on 27 December 1883 by Petar Matković. In 1927 Institute for physical geography is being established within the department and twenty years later incorporated in the newly established Faculty of science. Central geographical library was opened in 1910 and, until 1994 it was the only geographical library in Croatia.

Professor Ivan Crkvenčić launched Geographical papers scientific journal that is still being released, as well as Acta Geographica Croatica.

=== Department of Geophysics ===
The Department of Geophysics encompasses three major fields of study: meteorology, oceanography and seismology.

It also includes the Croatian Seismological Survey, a scientific organization which monitors earthquake activity in Croatia.

== Study programmes ==
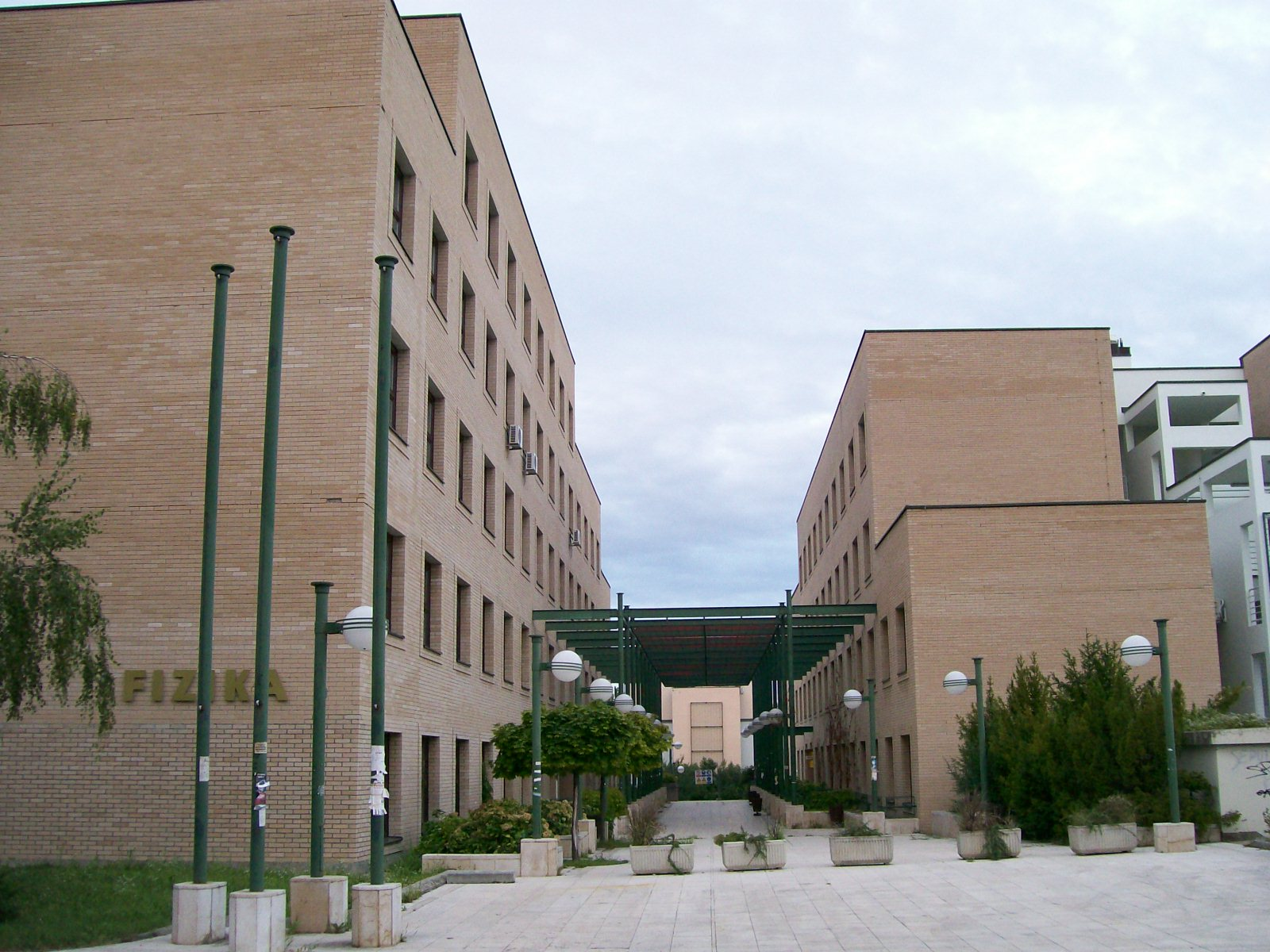
Department of Physics

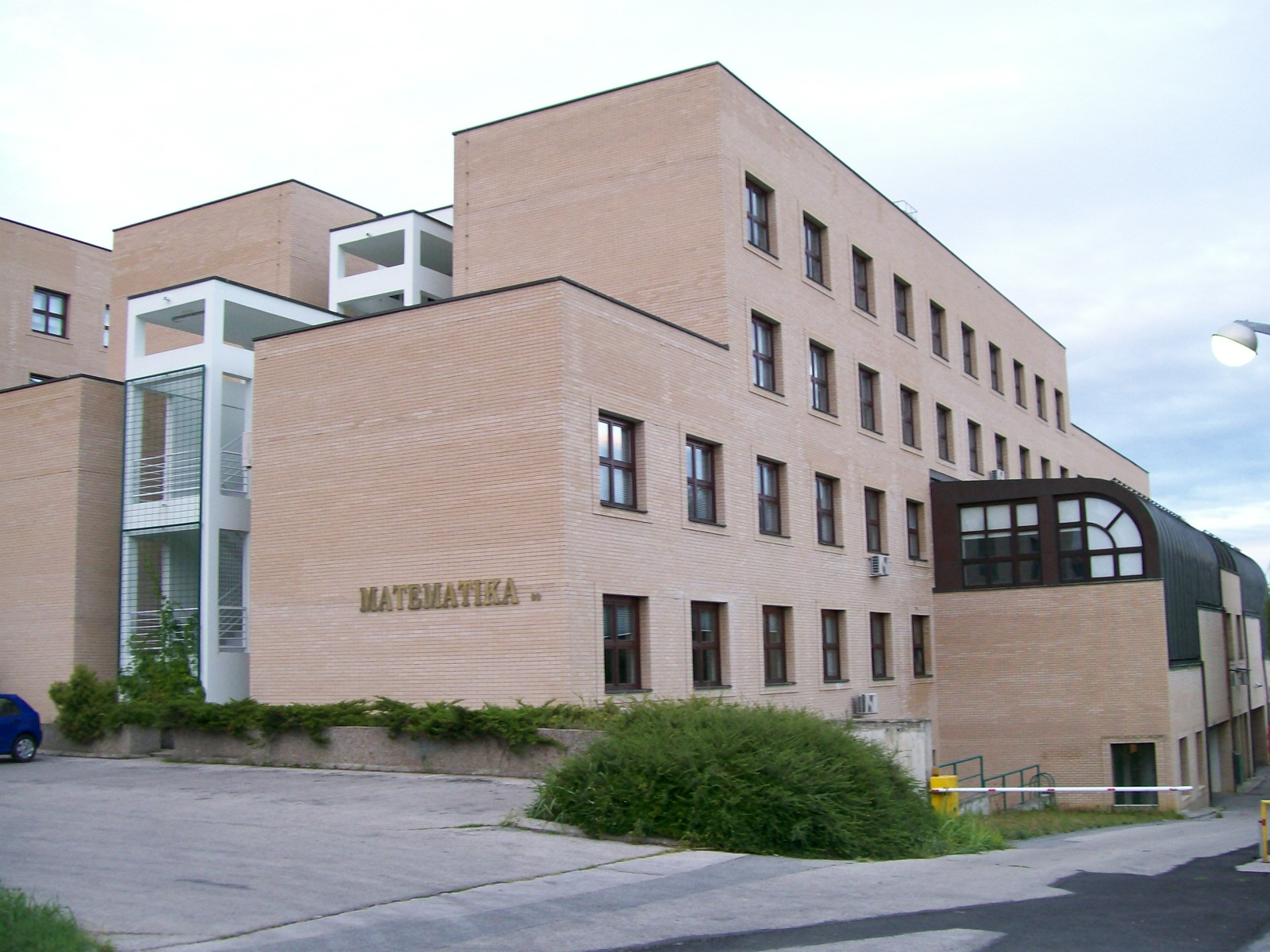
Department of Mathematics

The Faculty of Science has eight undergraduate study programmes (Bachelor degree) encompassing 3 years of studies (180 credits), 26 graduate study programmes (Master degree) encompassing two years of studies (120 credits) or five years of studies (300 credits) and seven postgraduate study programmes (PhD degree) encompassing 3 years of studies (180 credits). Education is at all levels characterized by teaching and supervision at a high academic level by staff actively involved in research. Departments of the Faculty are placed on several locations in Zagreb. The Departments of Physics, Mathematics, Geophysics, Chemistry, Geology, and the main administration of the Faculty are set at Horvatovac where a "campus of science" is being built. Departments of Biology and Geography are also going to be set at the same location in the near future.

The education of students in science and mathematics is a part of a comprehensive science education that qualifies them to work in research institutes, different branches of industry and production, the civil service (environmental protection, regional planning), public institutions (national parks, nature parks, reserves) and elsewhere, or as teachers in primary, secondary, and vocational schools.

=== List of study programmes ===
Bachelor of Science programmes (3 years study; 180 credits): Biology, Chemistry, Mathematics, Molecular Biology, Geography, Geology, Geophysics, Environmental Science.

Master of Science programmes (2 years study; 120 credits): Applied Mathematics, Chemistry, Computer Science and Mathematics, Ecology and Conservation, Environmental Science, Experimental Biology, Financial and Business Mathematics, Geography, Geology, Geophysics, Mathematics, Mathematical Statistics, Mineralogy, Molecular Biology, Pure Mathematics.

Master of Education programmes (2 years study; 120 credits): Chemistry, Mathematics and Computer Science, Geography.

Master of Science programmes (integrated undergraduate and graduate five years study; 300 credits): Physics.

Master of Education programmes (integrated undergraduate and graduate 5 years study; 300 credits): Biology and Chemistry, Geography and History, Mathematics and Physics, Physics, Physics and Chemistry, Physics and Computer Science, Physics and Technology.

Faculty also offers PhD degree programmes.

== Notable affiliates ==
=== Alumni ===
- Dr. Tanja Bosak – professor at Massachusetts Institute of Technology
- Arsen Bauk – Minister of Public Administration (Croatia)
- Mladen Bestvina – professor at University of Utah
- Jakša Cvitanić – professor at California Institute of Technology
- Silvija Gradečak, PhD – professor at Massachusetts Institute of Technology
- Dragan Miličić – professor at University of Utah
- Petrica Novosel Žic – professor at University of Zagreb
- Dr. Aleksandra Radenovic – professor at École Polytechnique Fédérale de Lausanne
- Dr. Ana Sunčana Smith – professor at University of Erlangen-Nuremberg
- Dr. Vernesa Smolčić – professor at University of Zagreb
- Dr. Iva Tolić – senior scientist at Ruđer Bošković Institute
- Krešimir Veselić – professor emeritus at University of Hagen
