= Kukura =

Kukura may be,

- Juraj Kukura (born 1947), Slovak actor
- Philipp Kukura (born 1978), Slovak physical chemist
- Kukurá language, a linguistic hoax
- Kukura, a Yadava clan in ancient India
