= List of botanical gardens in Croatia =

Botanical gardens in Croatia have collections consisting entirely of Croatia native and endemic species; most have a collection that include plants from around the world. There are botanical gardens and arboreta in all states and territories of Croatia, most are administered by local governments, some are privately owned.

This list of botanical gardens and arboretums in Croatia is intended to include all significant botanical gardens and arboretums in Croatia.

- Trsteno Arboretum, Dubrovnik
- Zagreb Botanical Garden, Zagreb
