= Tolić =

Tolić may refer to:

- Tolić, Serbia, a village in Kolubara District
- Tolić (surname)
