= Philipp Kukura =

Physical chemist

- Born: 26 March 1978 (age 48); Bratislava, Czechoslovakia
- Education: St Hugh's College, Oxford (MChem, 2002); University of California, Berkeley College of Chemistry (PhD, 2006)
- Awards: Marlow Award (2015); EBSA Young Investigator Award and Medal (2015); Royal Society Wolfson Research Merit Award (2017); Klung Wilhelmy Science Award (Chemistry) (2017); Blavatnik Awards for Young Scientists UK (Chemistry) (2019)
- Scientific career
- Fields: Physical chemistry
- Workplaces: Exeter College, Oxford
- Doctoral advisor: Richard A. Mathies

Philipp Kukura FRS FRSC (born 26 March 1978) is Professor of Chemistry at the University of Oxford, and a Fellow of Exeter College, Oxford. He is best known for pioneering contributions to femtosecond stimulated Raman spectroscopy (FSRS), interferometric scattering microscopy (iSCAT) and the development of mass photometry.

== Education and early life ==
He was born in Bratislava, then Czechoslovakia in a family of Slovak actor Juraj Kukura. In 1984, the family emigrated to Germany. In 2002, he graduated with a Master of Chemistry from the University of Oxford and competed in the 2001 and 2002 Rugby League Varsity matches. In 2006, he completed his PhD in Chemistry from the University of California, Berkeley College of Chemistry.

== Career and research ==
After completing his PhD, Kukura moved to Zürich. There he worked at the Swiss Federal Institute of Technology as a postdoctoral research assistant under the supervision of Professor Vahid Sandoghdar on nano-optics until 2010. He returned to Oxford in 2010 to work initially as an EPSRC Career Acceleration Fellow. In 2011, he was elected to a tutorial fellowship at Exeter College. In 2016 he was promoted to Full Professor of Chemistry.

In 2018, Kukura founded Refeyn Ltd. together with Justin Benesch, Daniel Cole, and Gavin Young to commercialise mass photometry.

== Selected publications ==
- Ortega Arroyo, J.; Andrecka, J.; Spillane, K. M.; Billington, N.; Takagi, Y.; Sellers, J. R.; Kukura, P. (21 March 2014). "Label-Free, All-Optical Detection, Imaging, and Tracking of a Single Protein". Nano Letters. 14 (4). American Chemical Society (ACS): 2065–2070. Bibcode:2014NanoL..14.2065O. doi:10.1021/nl500234t. ISSN 1530-6984. PMC 4186656. PMID 24597479.
- Cole, Daniel; Young, Gavin; Weigel, Alexander; Sebesta, Aleksandar; Kukura, Philipp (30 January 2017). "Label-Free Single-Molecule Imaging with Numerical-Aperture-Shaped Interferometric Scattering Microscopy". ACS Photonics. 4 (2). American Chemical Society (ACS): 211–216. doi:10.1021/acsphotonics.6b00912. ISSN 2330-4022. PMC 5323080. PMID 28255572. S2CID 40933123.
- Young, Gavin; Hundt, Nikolas; Cole, Daniel; Fineberg, Adam; Andrecka, Joanna; Tyler, Andrew; Olerinyova, Anna; Ansari, Ayla; Marklund, Erik G.; Collier, Miranda P.; Chandler, Shane A.; Tkachenko, Olga; Allen, Joel; Crispin, Max; Billington, Neil; Takagi, Yasuharu; Sellers, James R.; Eichmann, Cédric; Selenko, Philipp; Frey, Lukas; Riek, Roland; Galpin, Martin R.; Struwe, Weston B.; Benesch, Justin L. P.; Kukura, Philipp (27 April 2018). "Quantitative mass imaging of single biological macromolecules". Science. 360 (6387). American Association for the Advancement of Science (AAAS): 423–427. Bibcode:2018Sci...360..423Y. doi:10.1126/science.aar5839. ISSN 0036-8075. PMC 6103225. PMID 29700264.

== Honours and awards ==
- 2011 Royal Society of Chemistry Harrison-Meldola Award
- 2015 Royal Society of Chemistry Marlow Award
- 2017 EBSA Young Investigator Award and Medal
- 2018 Klung Wilhelmy Science Award (Chemistry)
- 2019 Blavatnik Awards for Young Scientists UK (Chemistry) Laureate
- 2021 RMS Medal for Light Microscopy
- 2022 Emil Thomas Kaiser Award
- 2022 Sosei Heptares Prize For Biophysics of the British Biophysical Society
- 2025 Fellow of the Royal Society
