= Ivan Crkvenčić =

Croatian food and regional geographer and geopolitician

Ph.D. Ivan Crkvenčić
- Born: May 24, 1923; Slanje near Ludbreg
- Died: October 24, 2011 (aged 88); Zagreb, Croatia
- Education: University of Zagreb
- Known for: Geografija SR Hrvatske (in six volumes)
- Spouse: Jasna Crkvenčić
- Children: Mladen Crkvenčić
- Scientific career
- Fields: geography of food regional geography geopolitics
- Workplaces: Faculty of Science, University of Zagreb; Institute for Geography (1964-1974)

Ivan Crkvenčić (24 May 1923 - 24 October 2011) was a prominent Croatian food and regional geographer as well as geopolitician.

He graduated at the Faculty of Science, University of Zagreb in Zagreb, where he obtained his doctorate in 1956 and lectured (1971–93). In 2000 he receives a professor emeritus title. Crkvenčić lectured as well in the United Kingdom, Norway, Germany, United States and Serbia. He was a dean of the Faculty of Science (1978–82) and founder and the only president of the Institute for Geography (1964–74) in Zagreb.

He was a founder and long-standing editor of the scientific journal Geographical Papers and author of the geographical encyclopedia in six volumes Geografija SR Hrvatske (”Geography of SR Croatia"). Other notable works include Afrika: regionalna geografija ("Africa: regional geography", 1966) and Afričko sredozemlje ("African Mediterranean", 1980). His works were published in journals Geographical Papers, Acta Croatica Geographica, Croatian Geographical Bulletin and others.
