= Dubravka Oraić Tolić =

Croatian poet, essayist, translator, and theorist of literature and culture (b. 1943)

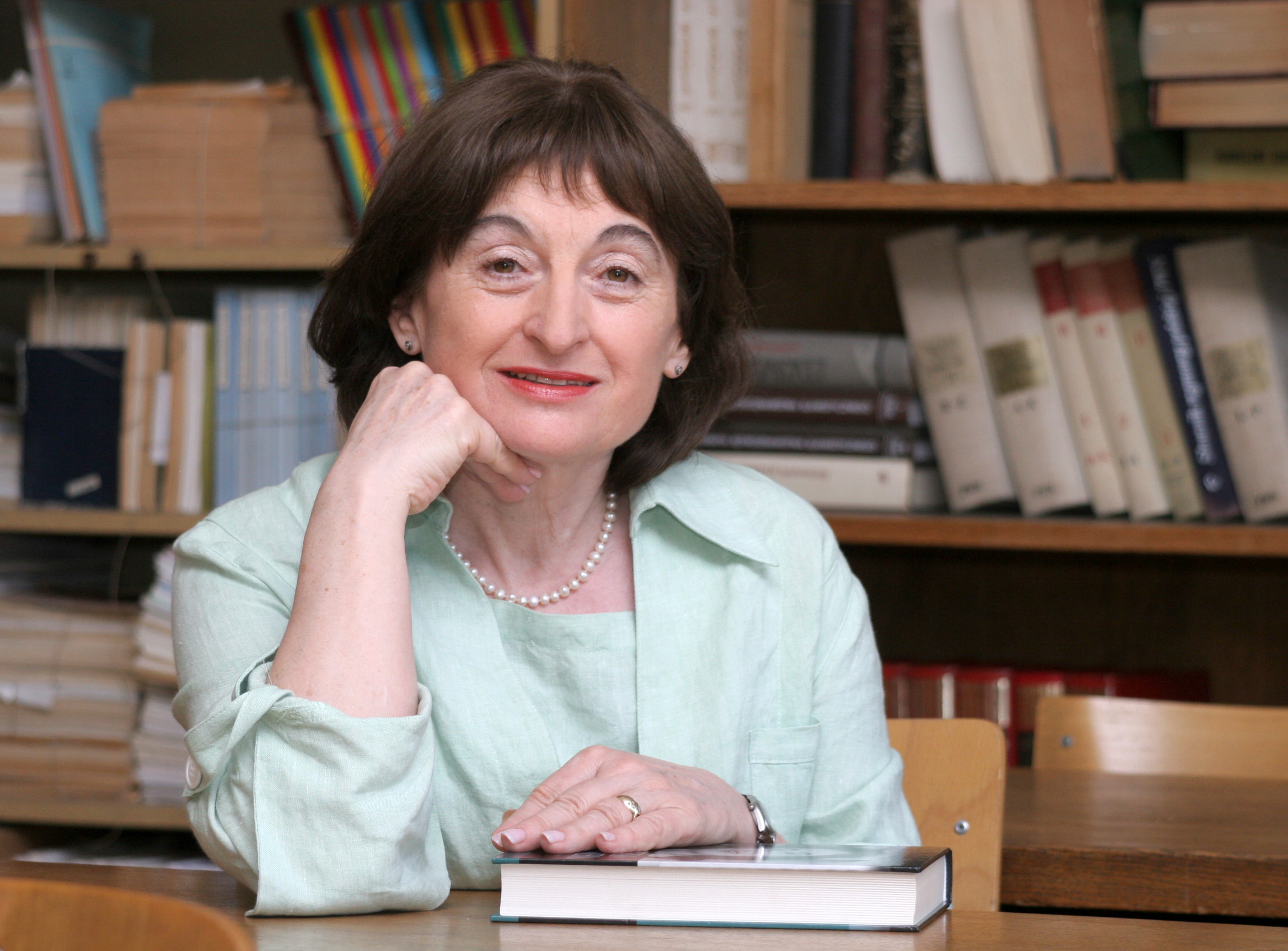
Dubravka Oraić Tolić

Dubravka Oraić Tolić (born in Slavonski Brod, on 1 August 1943) is a Croatian poet, essayist, translator, and theorist of literature and culture.

== Biography ==
Dubravka Oraić Tolić went to primary school in the village of Donji Andrijevci near Slavonski Brod, where she had met her future husband Benjamin Tolić. She studied Philosophy and Russian language with literature in Zagreb (1962–1966) and Vienna (1967–1969). She earned her master's degree with a thesis about a landscape in the opus of A. G. Matoš and her Doctorate Degree with a thesis on quotations in literature and culture.

From 1971 to 1998, she worked at the University of Zagreb Faculty of Humanities and Social Sciences’ Department of Literary Studies. She was a tenured professor of literary theory and culture until she retired in 2014. She taught as a guest professor at LMU Munich (1992) and the University of Göttingen (2007). She took part in scientific gatherings locally and abroad (Amsterdam, Bad Urach, Berlin, Bremen, Budapest, Heidelberg, Jena, Pecs, Petrograd, Rovereto, Veszprém).

In collaboration with Ivo Frangeš, she edited libraries The critical portraits of Croatian slavists and The encyclopedia of Croatian literature and also the Library L of the Institute of Literary Studies of the Faculty of Humanities and Social Sciences with Krešimir Nemec and Viktor Žmegač. She edited a series of almanacs with Ernő Kulcsár Szabó from the Eötvös Loránd University of Budapest, collaborated on Aleksandar Flaker's project The thesaurus of the Russian avantgarde and the Zagreb thesaurus of 20th-century culture, and has published around 150 scientific and professional papers in the theory of culture and Croatian and Russian literature.

She is a full member of the Croatian Academy of Sciences and Arts (HAZU), a member of the Croatian Writers Society, member of the Croatian Centre P. E. N., and a professor emeritus and vice president of the Matica hrvatska (where she also edited the Hrvatska revija magazine from 2012 to 2021). She became the editor-in-chief of Forum magazine, a monthly publication of the Croatian Academy of Sciences and Arts, in 2022.

== Personal life ==
She is the mother of Iva Tolić, a biophysicist, academic, and university professor.

== Publications ==
=== Books ===
- Oči bez domovine. Zagreb: Naprijed and Centar za kulturu Narodnoga sveučilišta grada Zagreba, 1969.
- Pejzaž u djelu A. G. Matoša. Zagreb: Nakladni zavod Matice hrvatske, 1980.
- Urlik Amerike. Zagreb: Sveučilišna naklada Liber, 1981.
- Teorija citatnosti. Zagreb: Grafički zavod Hrvatske, 1990.
- Palindromska apokalipsa. Zagreb: Durieux, 1993.
- Književnost i sudbina. Zagreb: Meandar, 1995.
- Das Zitat in Literatur und Kunst: Versuch einer Theorie. Aus dem Kroatischen übersetzt von Ulrich Dronske. Wien – Köln –Weimar: Böhlau Verlag, 1995.
- Matoševa proza. In the: Zoran Kravar and Dubravka Oraić Tolić, Lirika i proza Antuna Gustava Matoša. Zagreb: Školska knjiga, 1996.
- Paradigme 20. stoljeća. Zagreb: Zavod za znanost o književnosti Filozofskoga fakulteta Sveučilišta u Zagrebu, 1996.
- Dvadeseto stoljeće u retrovizoru. Zagreb: Školska knjiga, 2000.
- The American Scream. Palyndrome Apocalypse. Translation by Sibelan Forrester, William E. Yuill, and Sonja Bašić. Cover photo by Miroslav Šutej. Portland: Ooligan Press, 2005. The translation by Sibelan Forrester was awarded with a Heldt Prize in 2006.
- Muška moderna i ženska postmoderna: Rođenje virtualne kulture. Zagreb: Naklada Ljevak, 2005.
- Männliche Moderne und weibliche Postmoderne: Geburt der virtuellen Kultur. Aus dem Kroatischen übersetzt von Ulrich Dronske. Wien: Peter Lang, 2008.
- Akademsko pismo: Strategije i tehnike klasične retorike za suvremene studentice i studente. Zagreb: Naklada Ljevak, 2011.
- Čitanja Matoša. Zagreb: Naklada Ljevak, 2013.
- Hlebnikov i avangard. Moskva: Vest-Konsalting, 2013.
- Antun Gustav Matoš: Ein Klassiker der kroatischen Moderne. Aus dem Kroatischen übersetzt von Ulrich Dronske. Peter Lang: Frankfurt am Main – Bern – Bruxelles – New York – Oxford – Warszawa – Wien, 2014.
- Peto evanđelje: Sedam dana u Svetoj Zemlji. Zagreb: Naklada Ljevak, 2016.
- Doživljaji Karla Maloga. Zagreb: Naklada Ljevak, 2018.
- Citatnost u književnosti, umjetnosti i kulturi. Zagreb: Naklada Ljevak, 2019.
- Matoševo pjesništvo. In the: Antun Gustav Matoš: Pjesme i Epigrami / Dubravka Oraić Tolić: Matoševo pjesništvo. Zagreb: Matica hrvatska, 2020.
- Doživljaji Karla Maloga. Zagreb: Hrvatska knjižnica za slijepe, 2021.
- Zagebačka stilistička škola: Zlatno doba hrvatske znanosti o književnosti. Zagreb: Naklada Ljevak, 2022.

=== Editing ===
- Intertekstualnost & Intermedijalnost. Edited by: Z. Maković, M. Medarić, D. Oraić [Tolić], P. Pavličić. Zagreb: Zavod za znanost o književnosti Filozofskog fakulteta Sveučilišta u Zagrebu, 1988.
- Josip Sever: Borealni konj. Prepared by and introductory essay written by: Dubravka Oraić Tolić. Zagreb: Mladost, 1989.
- Antun Gustav Matoš: Putopisi. Prepared and epilogue written by: Dubravka Oraić Tolić. Vinkovci: Privlačica, 1994.
- Hrvatsko ratno pismo 1991/92//Croatian War Writing 1991/92. Documentary monography. Edited by and foreword written by: Dubravka Oraić Tolić. Zagreb: Zavod za znanost o književnosti Filozofskoga fakulteta Sveučilišta u Zagrebu, 1992. Croatian and English. Illustrations.
- Intertekstualnost & Autoreferencijalnost. Edited by: D. Oraić Tolić and V. Žmegač. Zagreb: Zavod za znanost o književnosti Filozofskog fakulteta Sveučilišta u Zagrebu, 1993.
- Kraj stoljeća – krajevi stoljeća. Papers from the international symposium, Opatija, September 28 – October 1, 1997. Edited by: D. Oraić Tolić and V. Žmegač. Umjetnost riječi (Zagreb), 1999, No. 3–4.
- Kulturni stereotipi: Koncepti identiteta u srednjoeuropskim književnostima. Papers from the international symposium, Lovran, May 19 – 23, 2004. Edited by: D. Oraić Tolić and E. Kulcsár Szabó. Zagreb: FF press, 2006.
- Kultur in Reflexion: Beiträge zur Geschichte der mitteleuropäischen Literaturwissenschaften. Edited by: E. Kulcsár Szabó and D. Oraić Tolić. Wien: Wilhelm Braumueller Universitäts-Verlagsbuchhandlung, 2008.
- Zagrebačka književnoznanstvena škola. Umjetnost riječi (Zagreb), 2009, No. 3–4.
- Reinhard Lauer: Povijest ruske književnosti. Professional redaction and afterword Dubravka Oraić Tolić. Zagreb: Golden marketing-Tehnička knjiga, 2009.
- Imaginacije prostora: Centri i periferije – metropole i provincije u književnostima i kuloturama Srednje Europe. Edited by: D. Oraić Tolić and E. E. Kulcsár Szabó. Zagreb: Disput, 2013.
- Hrvatsko proljeće u sjećanjima suvremenika: Memoarski zapisi u povodu 50-obljetnice Hrvatskoga proljeća (1971–2021).Prepared by and intro written by: Dubravka Oraić Tolić. Zagreb: Matica hrvatska, 2021.

=== Translations ===
- Valentin Katajev, Trava zaborava (Sveti zdenac, Trava zaborava, Kockica). Rijeka: Otokar Keršovani, 1975.
- Vladimir Majakovski, Rat i mir (svijet). Gordogan (Zagreb), 2, 1980, 5–6, 49–83.
- Andrej Bjeli, Petrograd. Liber, Zagreb, 1981.
- Velimir Hljebnikov, Zangezi. Dometi (Rijeka), XIV, 1981, 6, 15–35.
- Sergej Birjukov: Stihija stihova. Treći program hrvatskoga radija 2013, 85, 233–251.

== Awards and acknowledgments ==
- 1969. The first prize of the Literary youth fund “A. B. Šimić” for the collection of poems Oči bez domovine.
- 1996. Order of Morning star of Croatia with Marko Marulić face for notable contributions in culture.
- 2006. Vjesnik’s prize for the book of the year for Muška moderna i ženska postmoderna, Zagreb: Naklada Ljevak, 2005.
- 2012. The charter of the University of Zagreb’s Faculty of Humanities and Social Sciences for age-long contribution to the faculty.
- 2012. The state science award for life’s work in the academic field of the Humanities.
- 2013. The HAZU 2013 Award for the highest scientific and artistic Achievements in the Republic of Croatia in the field of literature for the book Akademsko pismo: Strategije i tehnike klasične retorike za suvremene studentice i studente, Zagreb: Naklada Ljevak, 2011.
- 2016. Josip and Ivan Kozarac’s Lifetime Achievement.
- 2018. Prize Josip and Ivan Kozarac for the book of the year for the novel Doživljaji Karla Maloga, Zagreb: Naklada Ljevak, 2018.
- 2021. Vladimir Nazor Award for Life Achievement in the field of Literature.
