= Tolić, Serbia =

Tolić Толић
- Village (Selo)
- Location within Serbia
- Coordinates: 44°13′06″N 20°03′53″E
- Country: Serbia
- District: Kolubara District
- Municipality: Mionica
- Time zone: UTC+1 (CET)
  - Summer (DST): UTC+2 (CEST)

Tolić is a village situated in Mionica municipality in Serbia.

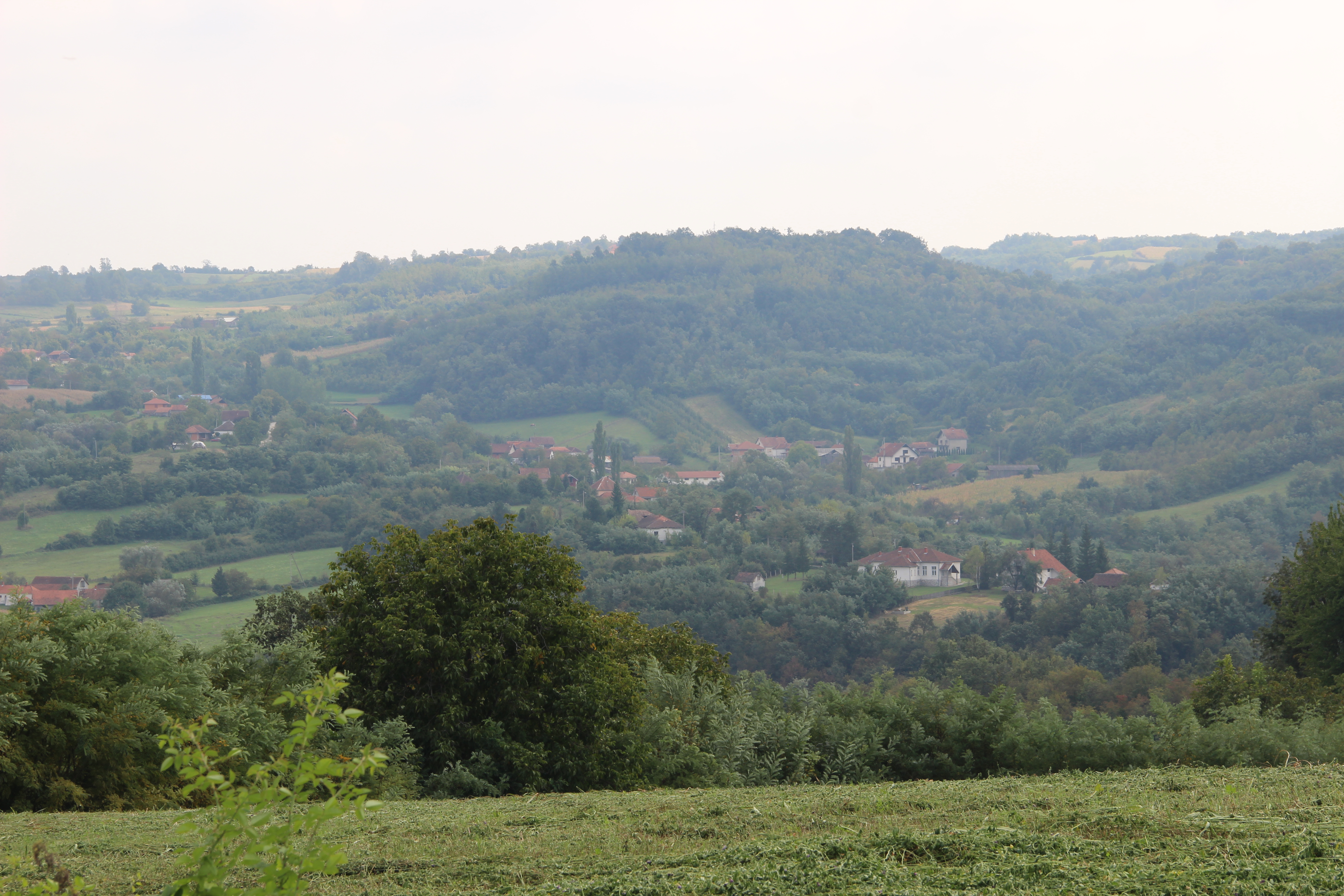
Tolić - panorama

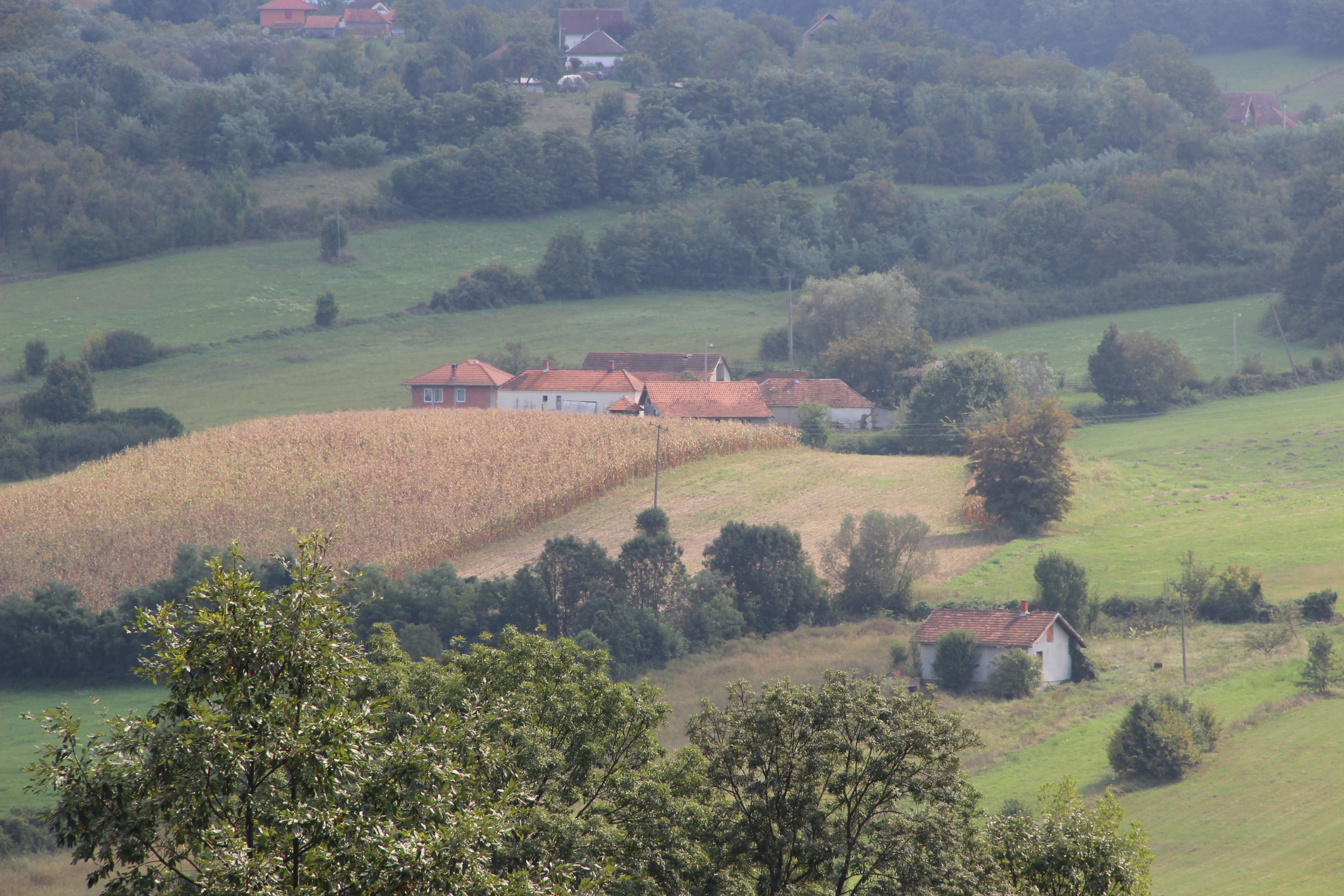
Tolić - panorama

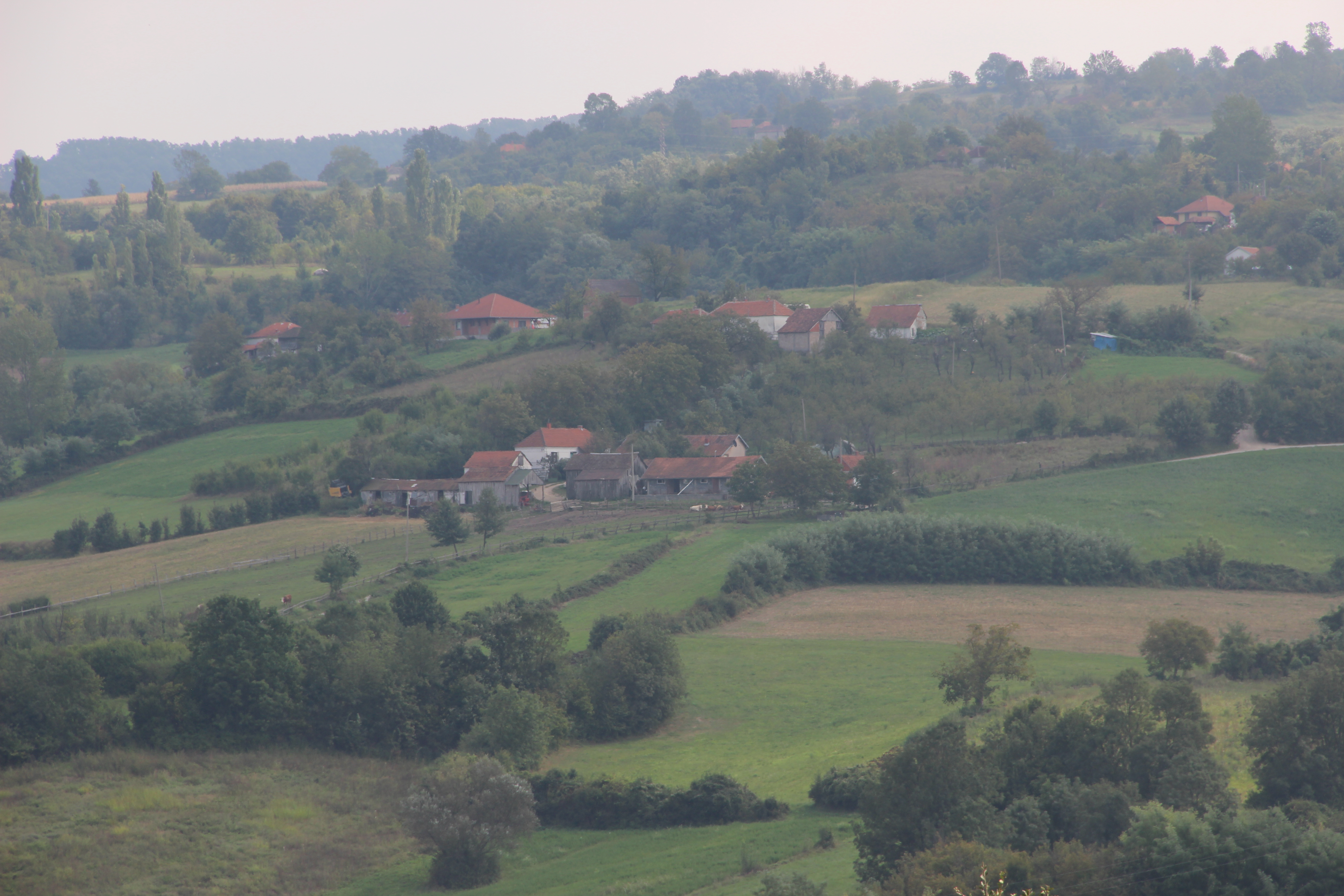
Tolić - panorama

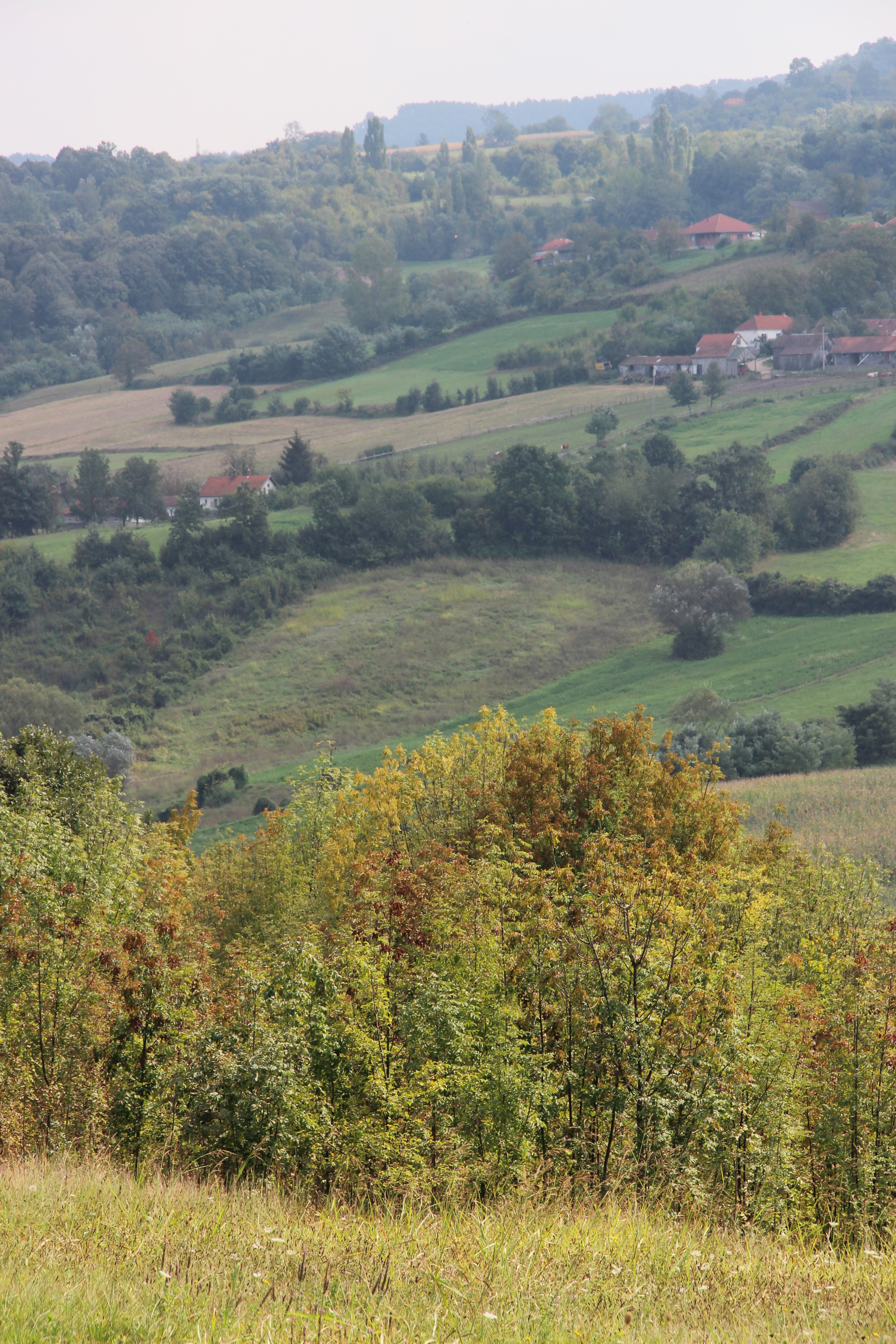
Tolić - panorama

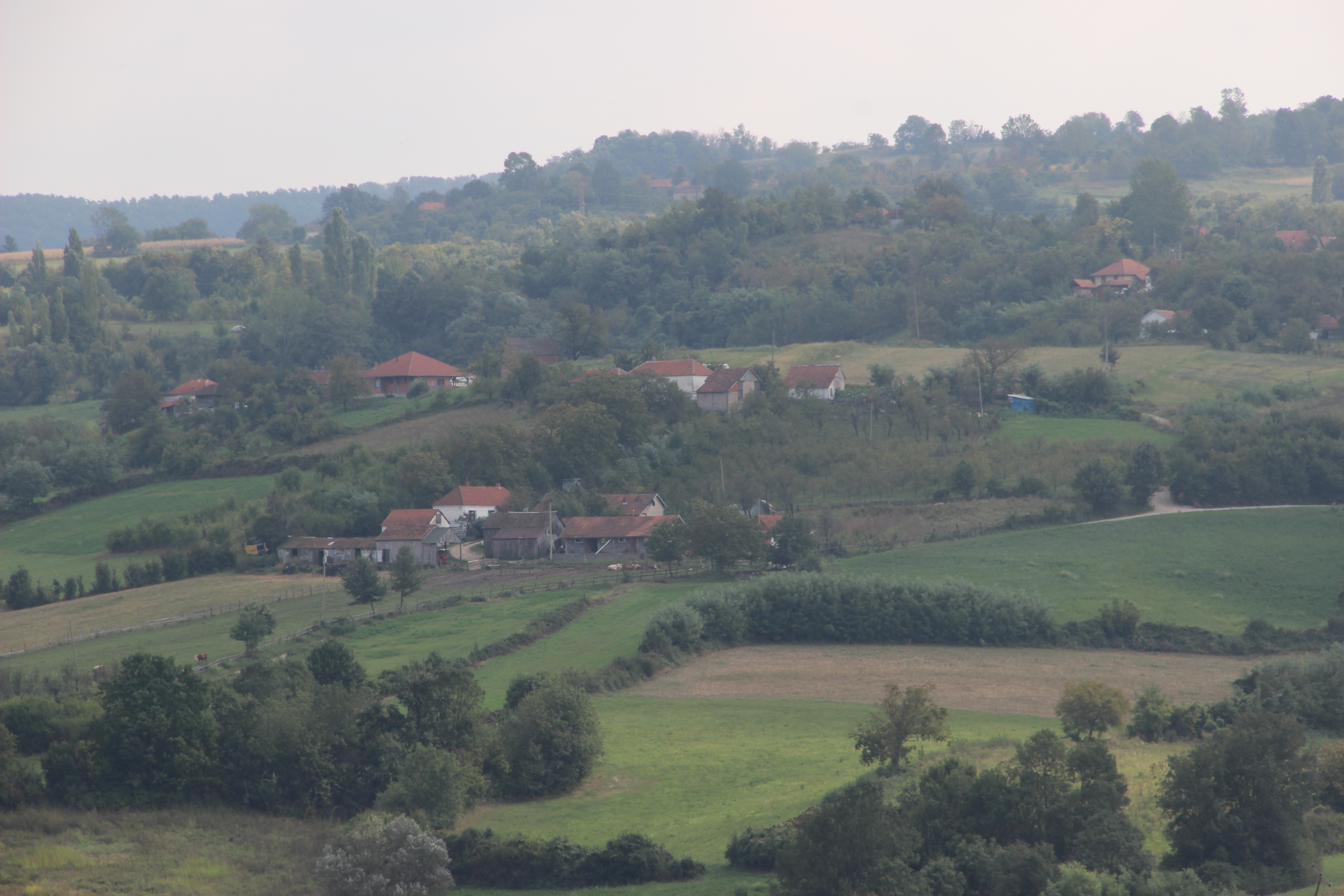
Tolić - panorama

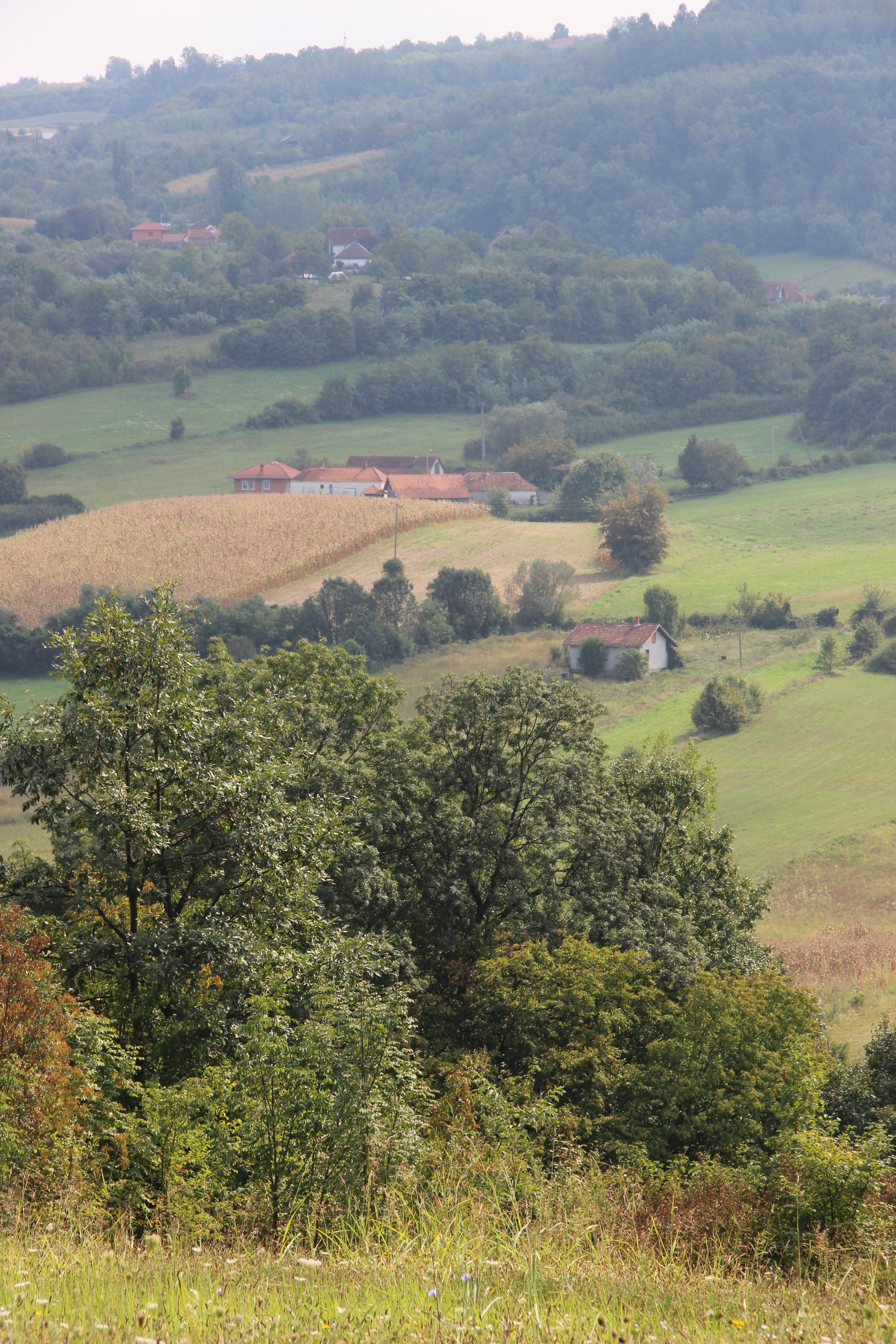
Tolić - panorama
