= Juraj Kukura =

Slovak actor (born 1947)

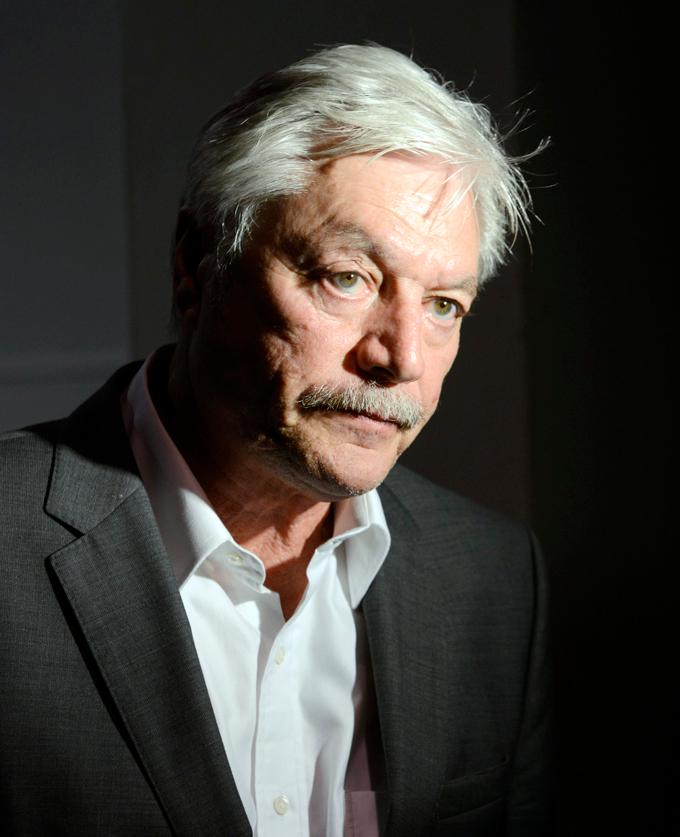
- Juraj Kukura (2014)
- Born: 15 March 1947 (age 79); Prešov, Czechoslovakia
- Occupation: Actor
- Years active: 1966–present
- Children: 2 (including Philipp Kukura)
- Parent(s): Štefan Kukura and Helena Kukurová
- Awards: Medal of Merit (2017); Pribina Cross, 1st class (2025)

Juraj Kukura (born 15 March 1947, in Prešov) is a Slovak actor.

Kukura studied acting at the Academy of Performing Arts in Bratislava (VŠMU). In 1985, when he emigrated to West Germany, his films were banned in the Czechoslovak Socialist Republic until Communist rule ended during the Velvet Revolution of 1989. Thanks to his charismatic personality he usually portrayed strong, leading characters. In 2004, he received DOSKY Award for performing Martin in The Goat, or Who is Sylvia? by Edward Albee. He served as managing director of the Arena Theatre in Bratislava from 2003 to 2025.

== Recognition ==
In October 2017, Kukura was awarded the Medal of Merit by the Czech president Miloš Zeman.

In 2020 he won a Crystal Wing Awards in the 'Theater and Audiovisual Arts' category.

In January 2025, Kukura was awarded Pribina Cross, 1st class for extraordinary contributions to development of culture in Slovakia by the president of Slovakia Peter Pellegrini.

== Personal life ==
Kukura has two children. His son Philipp Kukura is a professor of chemistry at the University of Oxford.

== Filmography ==
=== Film ===
- Zbehovia a pútnici (1968) – Dominika – hrebenár
- Eden and After (1970) – Boris
- Zlozor (1971) – Slávo
- N. a pris les dés... (1971)
- Letokruhy (1973)
- Javor a Juliana (1973) – Musician
- Den slnovratu (1974) – Pavol Jurek
- Trofej neznámeho strelca (1974) – Salo
- Do zbrane kuruci! (1974) – Hamzík
- One Silver Piece (1976) – Pitonák
- Koncert pre pozostalých (1977) – Peter Korta
- Krutá lúbost (1978)
- Shadows of a Hot Summer (1978) – Ondrej Baran
- The Ninth Heart (1979) – Aldobrandini
- The Divine Emma (1979) – Victor
- Postaveni mimo hru (1979) – Jindrich Vacula
- The Hit (1981) – Lensky
- Clny proti prudu (1981)
- Sarâb (1982) – Statkár
- Tusenie (1983) – Fero Usiak
- Salt & Gold (1983) – král Norbert
- The Roaring Fifties (1983) – Jakob Fuhrmann
- Sojky v hlave (1984) – Vojto
- Otto – Der Liebesfilm (1992) – Dr. Beierle
- It's Better to Be Wealthy and Healthy Than Poor and Ill (1992) – Robert
- Jak chutná smrt (1995) – Karel Kainar
- Workaholic (1996) – Cedrik
- Tábor padlych zien (1997) – Doctor Zigmund
- Thomas and the Falcon King (2000) – Balador
- Fragmenty z malomesta (2000)
- Apokalypse 99 – Anatomie eines Amokläufers (2000)
- Das Sams (2001) – Oberkellner
- Atina & Herakles (2006) – August
- The Last Train (2006) – Dr. Friedlich
- Máj (2008) – Schiffner
- Hotel Lux (2011) – Wassili Ulrich
- Sarajevo (2014) – Stojan Jeftanovic
- Láska hory prenásí (2022) – Juraj Kukura

=== Television ===
- Via Mala (1985) – Andreas von Richenau
- Traffik (1989) – Karl Rosshalde
- Inspektor Max (2018) – Zoltán Max
