= Iva Tolić =

Croatian agricultural biologist

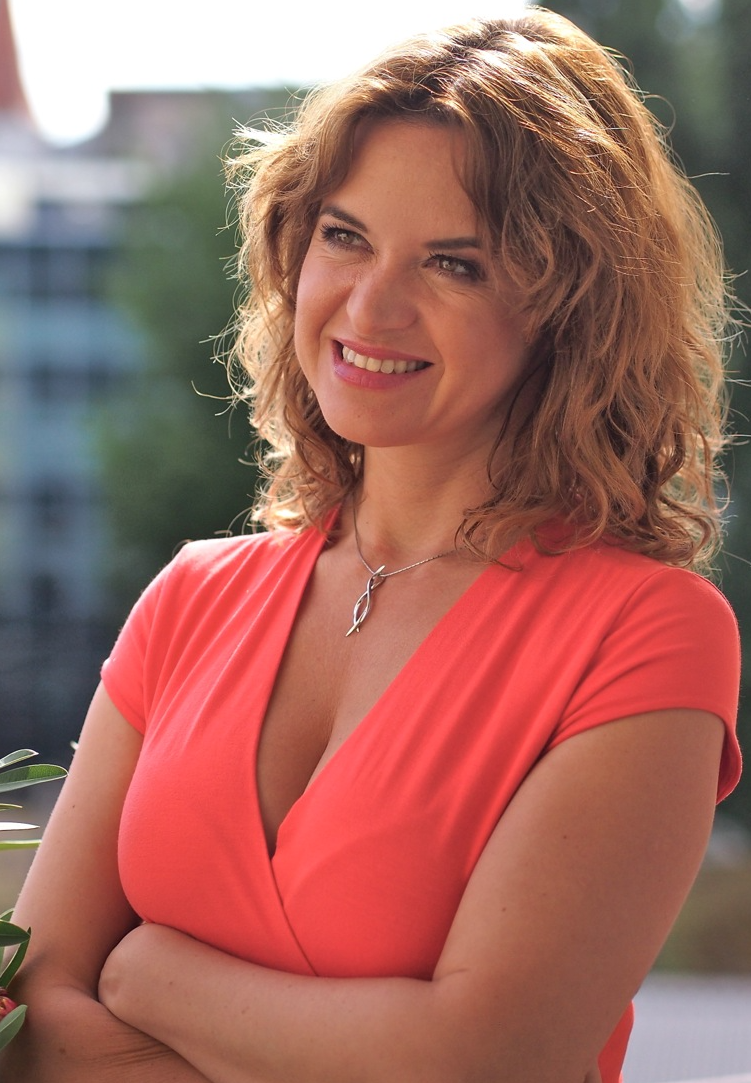
- Iva Tolić, Ruđer Bošković Institute
- Born: 24 June 1974 (age 52); Zagreb, Croatia
- Occupation: Scientist/Academic
- Spouse: Nenad Brgić (married 2014)
- Children: 2
- Awards: Lieben Prize (2017); EBSA Young Investigators' Medal and Prize (2015); Cell '40 under 40' (2014)

Academic background
- Education: PhD
- Alma mater: University of Zagreb, Croatia
- Thesis: (2002)

Academic work
- Discipline: Biology
- Sub-discipline: Biophysics
- Institutions: Max Planck Institute of Molecular Cell Biology and Genetics (Dresden, Germany); Ruđer Bošković Institute (Zagreb, Croatia)
- Website: tolic.irb.hr

Iva Marija Tolić (born 24 June 1974) is a Croatian biophysicist, known for her work on the microtubule cytoskeleton and associated motor proteins. She is currently senior research group leader and professor of biology at the Ruđer Bošković Institute in Zagreb, Croatia.

== Education ==
Tolić completed her diploma in molecular biology from the University of Zagreb, Croatia in 1996 and her graduate studies in molecular biology in the group of Nenad Trinajstić, Ruđer Bošković Institute and University of Zagreb, Croatia in 1999. Between 1999 and 2001, she completed part of her PhD work with Ning Wang, Harvard School of Public Health, Boston, United States and was awarded her doctorate in biology in 2002 by the University of Zagreb, Croatia.

== Career ==
Upon obtaining her doctorate, Tolić did her first postdoctoral training between 2001 and 2002 at the Niels Bohr Institute, Copenhagen, Denmark, working with Lene Oddershede and Kirstine Berg-Sorensen on the microrheology of cells. She then joined the European Laboratory for Non-Linear Spectroscopy, Florence, Italy for postdoctoral research with Prof. Francesco Pavone, working on lymphocyte movement and laser microsurgery on the mitotic spindle. Following her postdoctoral training, Tolić was appointed as research group leader (W1, equivalent to assistant professor) at the Max Planck Institute of Molecular Cell Biology and Genetics, Dresden, Germany in 2005 and was promoted to senior research group leader (W2, equivalent to associate professor) in 2010. In 2014, she moved to the Ruđer Bošković Institute, Zagreb, Croatia, being appointed as senior research group leader and professor of biology.

== Research ==
As independent investigator, Tolić has carried out pioneering research in the field of cell biology pertaining to the microtubule cytoskeleton and associated motor proteins, discovering: (i) a novel mechanism of kinetochore capture during mitosis by pivoting of astral microtubules around the spindle pole, (ii) a mechanism of regulation of the motor protein cytoplasmic dynein by attachment to its anchor protein in fission yeast and most recently, (iii) 'Bridging fibers' that are non-kinetochore microtubules connecting sister k-fibers and thereby balancing forces in the spindle.

In addition, her research has demonstrated that fission yeast does not undergo replicative aging, contrary to existing theories on aging.

== Personal life ==
Tolić's parents are the journalist and diplomat Benjamin Tolić and academic Dubravka Oraić Tolić. She married Nenad Brgić in 2014 and she is the mother of two children. She has stated publicly that she sees no conflict between religion and science, and describes herself as a believer.

== Awards and achievements ==
- Member of the Academia Europaea, 2022.
- ERC Synergy Grant, 2019.
- EMBO Membership, 2018.
- Lieben Prize, 2017.
- National Science Award of the Republic of Croatia, 2016.
- Croatian Women of Influence Award, 2016.
- Special award of the Ruđer Bošković Institute for outstanding contribution to the scientific excellence and international recognition of the institute, 2015.
- European Biophysics Societies Association Young Investigators' Medal and Prize, 2015.
- 5000th Grantee of the European Research Council, 2015.
- MRAK award for creativity in science awarded for the collaboration with the Ruđer Bošković Institute.
- Order of Danica Hrvatska for science, outstanding contributions to science and its promotion in the Republic of Croatia and the world, 2014
- Investigator of the Year, European Life Science Award, 2014.
- Featured on Cell "40 under 40", 2014.

== Membership in professional associations and societies ==
Tolić is a member of European Molecular Biology Organization, the Croatian Biophysical Society, the Croatian Society of Biochemistry and Molecular Biology and the Croatian Microscopy Society. In addition, she is Member of the Scientific Advisory Board of the journal Science.
