= Zagreb Botanical Garden =

Botanical garden in Zagreb, Croatia

Coordinates: 45.48°N 15.58°E

- Botanički vrt u Zagrebu
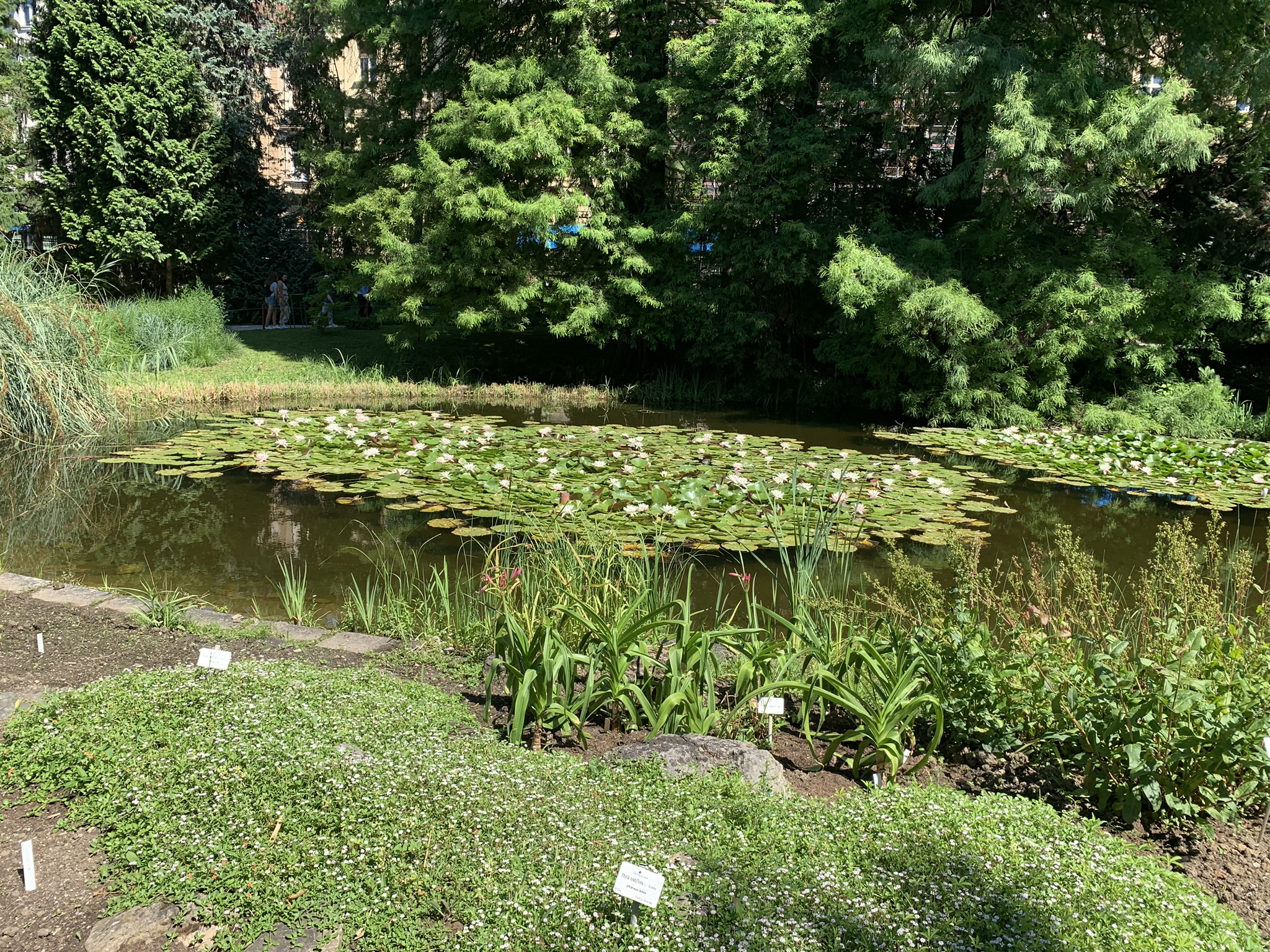
- East side of the garden
- Interactive map of Zagreb Botanical Garden
- Type: Botanical garden
- Location: Marulićev trg 9a Zagreb, Croatia
- Area: 5 hectares (12 acres)
- Opened: 1889
- Operator: Faculty of Science, University of Zagreb
- Status: Open year round
- Website: Official website

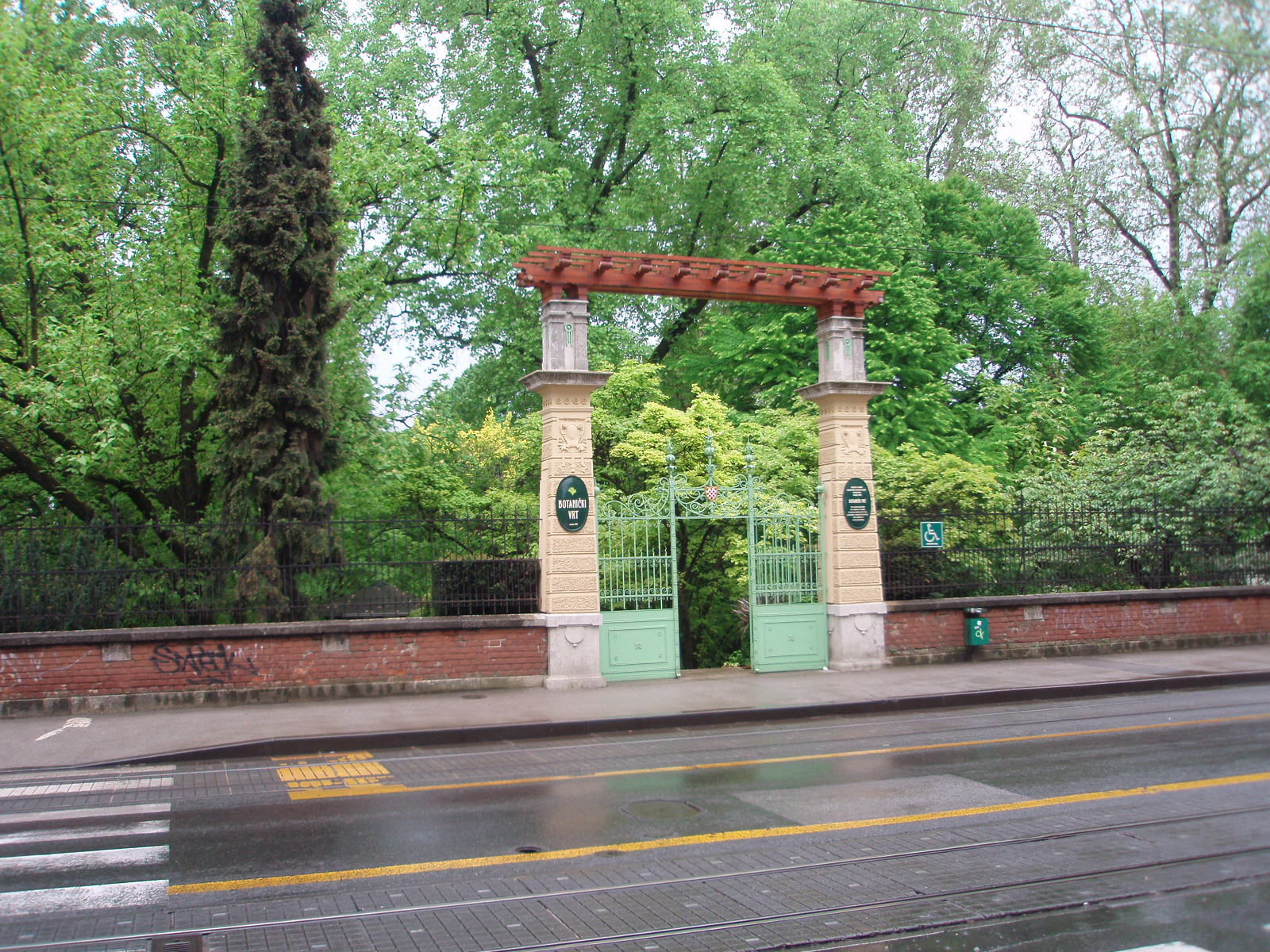
Gate entrance to the garden

The Zagreb Botanical Garden (Croatian: Botanički vrt u Zagrebu) is a botanical garden located in downtown Zagreb, Croatia. Founded in 1889 by Antun Heinz, Professor of the University of Zagreb, and opened to public in 1891, it is part of the Faculty of Science. Covering an area of 5 hectares (12 acres), the garden is situated at an altitude of 120 metres (390 ft) above sea level. It is home to over 10,000 plant species from around the world, including 1,800 exotic ones. It has large ponds for aquatic plants. Some of Slava Raškaj's most notable works were painted by the garden ponds.

== History ==
The concept of establishing a botanical garden affiliated with the University of Zagreb's Faculty of Philosophy’s Botanical and Physiological Institute was originally proposed by Professor Bohuslav Jiruš, the first botany lecturer at the University of Zagreb. It was his successor, Professor Antun Heinz, who brought the plan to life, founding the garden in 1889. Following a year-long tour of European botanical gardens, Professor Heinz—assisted by head gardener Viteslav Durhanek—crafted the master plan that would shape the garden’s future layout. Construction began in 1890, and by 1892 the first planting was underway. The vegetation was arranged not only with taxonomic relationships in mind (according to phylogenetic principles), but also with a strong emphasis on visual harmony.

The majority of the space was designed in a naturalistic, English landscape style, featuring informal clusters of trees and shrubs, winding paths, and an organic layout. In contrast, the floral parterre near the greenhouse adhered to a strict symmetrical layout, following the more formal French aesthetic.

Beyond the greenery, various structures were added over time: a greenhouse and gardener’s residence appeared early on, followed by a pavilion, public restroom, ornamental ponds, and fountains. One notable milestone came in 1908 with the garden’s first official plant-collecting expedition. The team gathered 128 native plant species from regions near Zagreb, Samobor, and Gorski Kotar. By the early 20th century, only a decade after its founding, the Botanical Garden had already evolved into a diverse and meticulously maintained haven, praised in the writings of Professor Heinz for both its scientific value and its beauty.

== Botanical garden ==
The Botanical Garden in Zagreb currently hosts around 5,000 plant species from various parts of the world, including many that are protected or endemic. The collection is dynamic, with new annual plants introduced each year. Every specimen is carefully labeled with its Latin name, so casual visitors can look up information and learn more about the species. The garden serves as a peaceful retreat for many, and it primarily supports students in the natural sciences by offering hands-on experience with the garden’s diverse ecosystem. Botanists working at the garden are actively involved in conserving native Croatian flora, conducting field research, and collecting seeds to grow and share specimens with other botanical gardens across the globe.

== Gallery ==
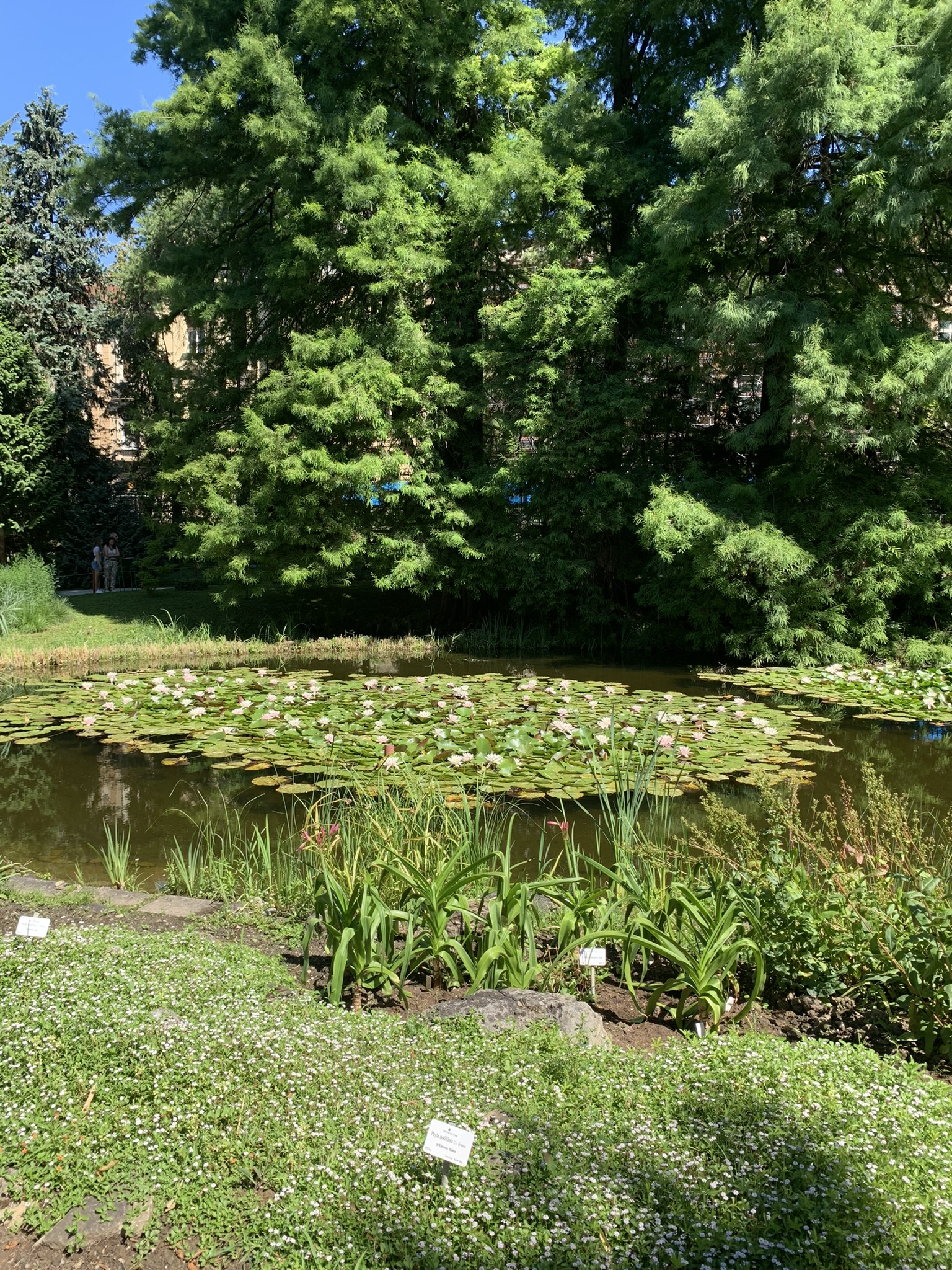
One of the lakes

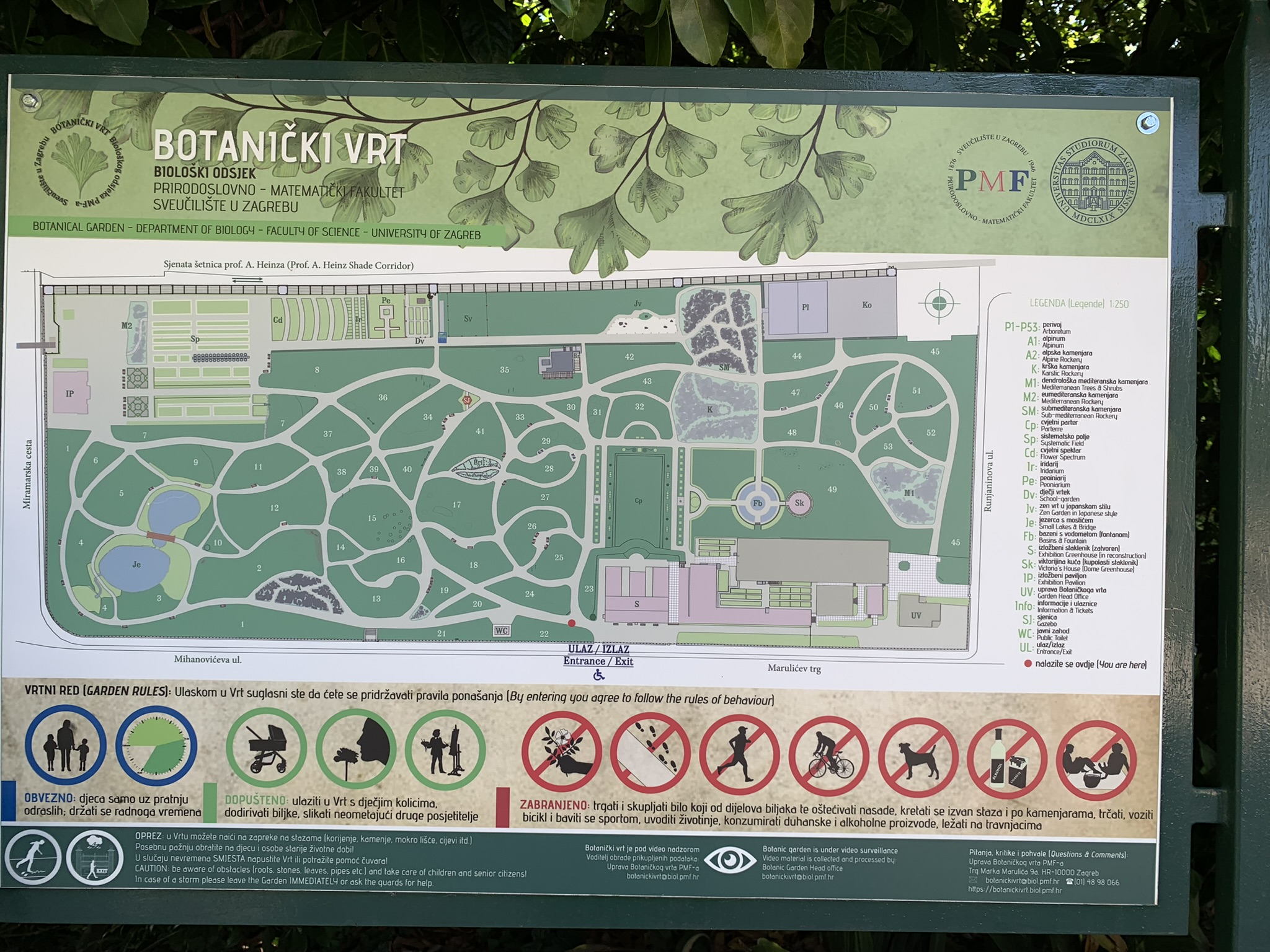
Botanical garden map

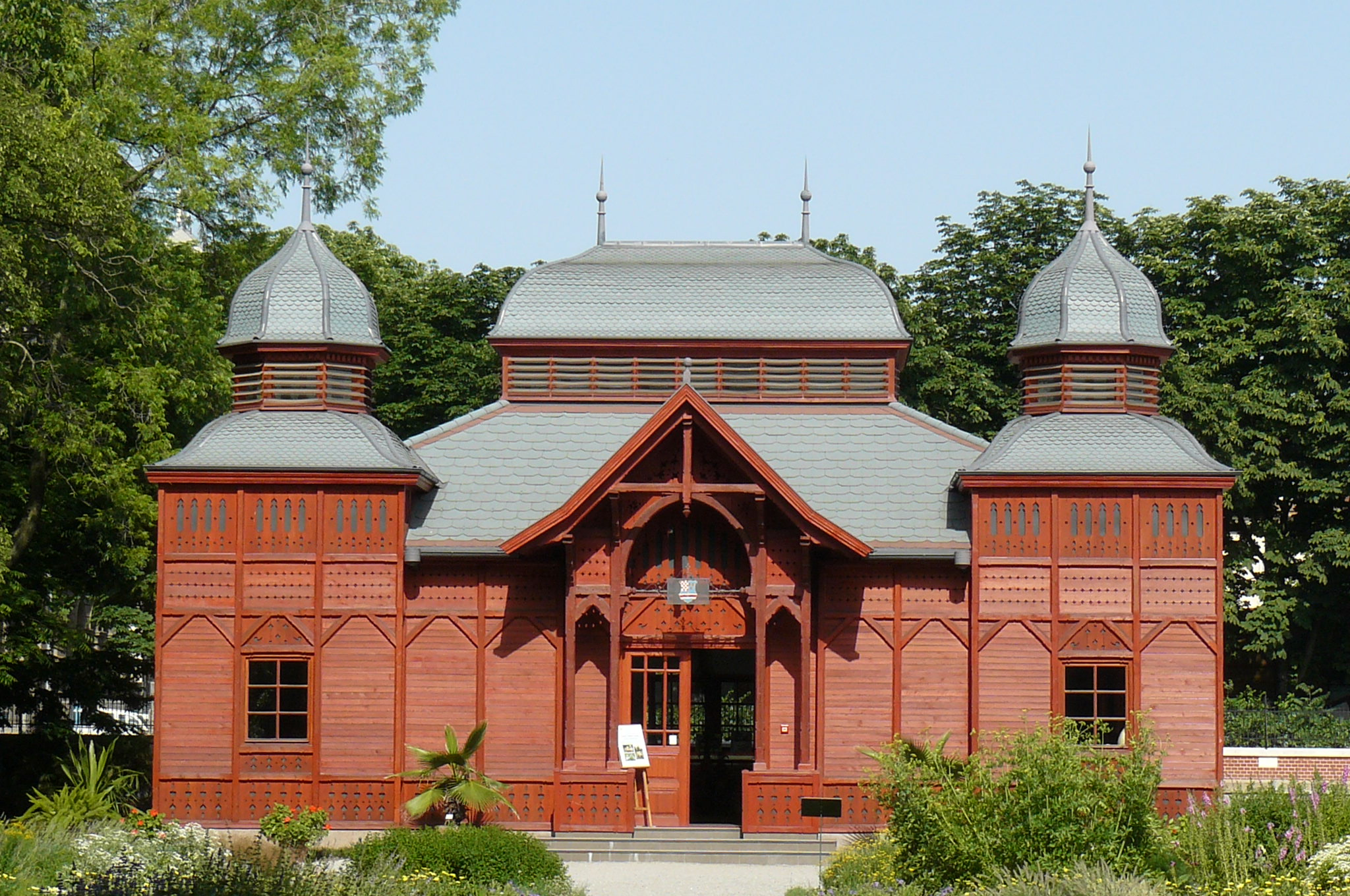
Exhibition pavillon

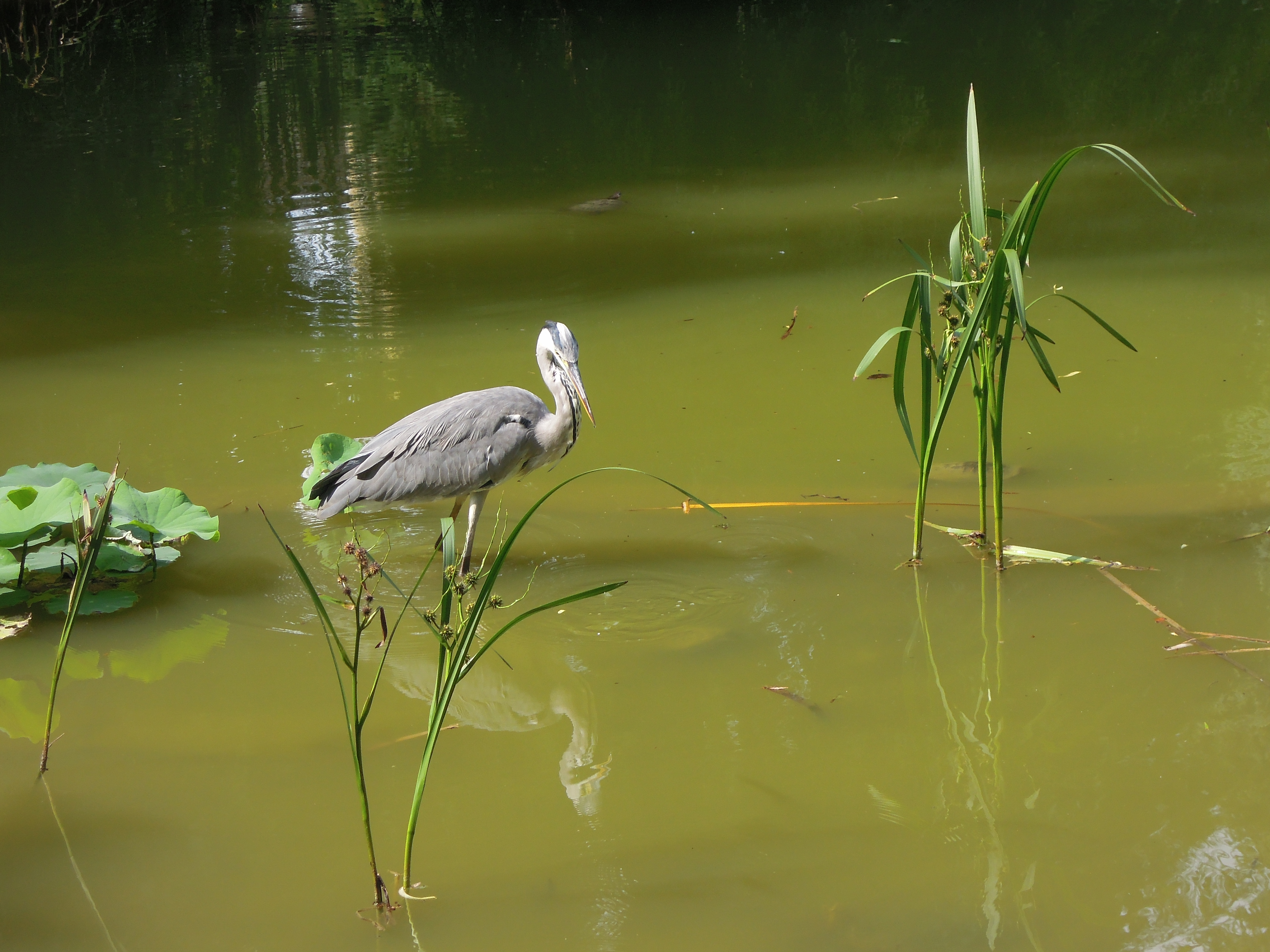
Heron

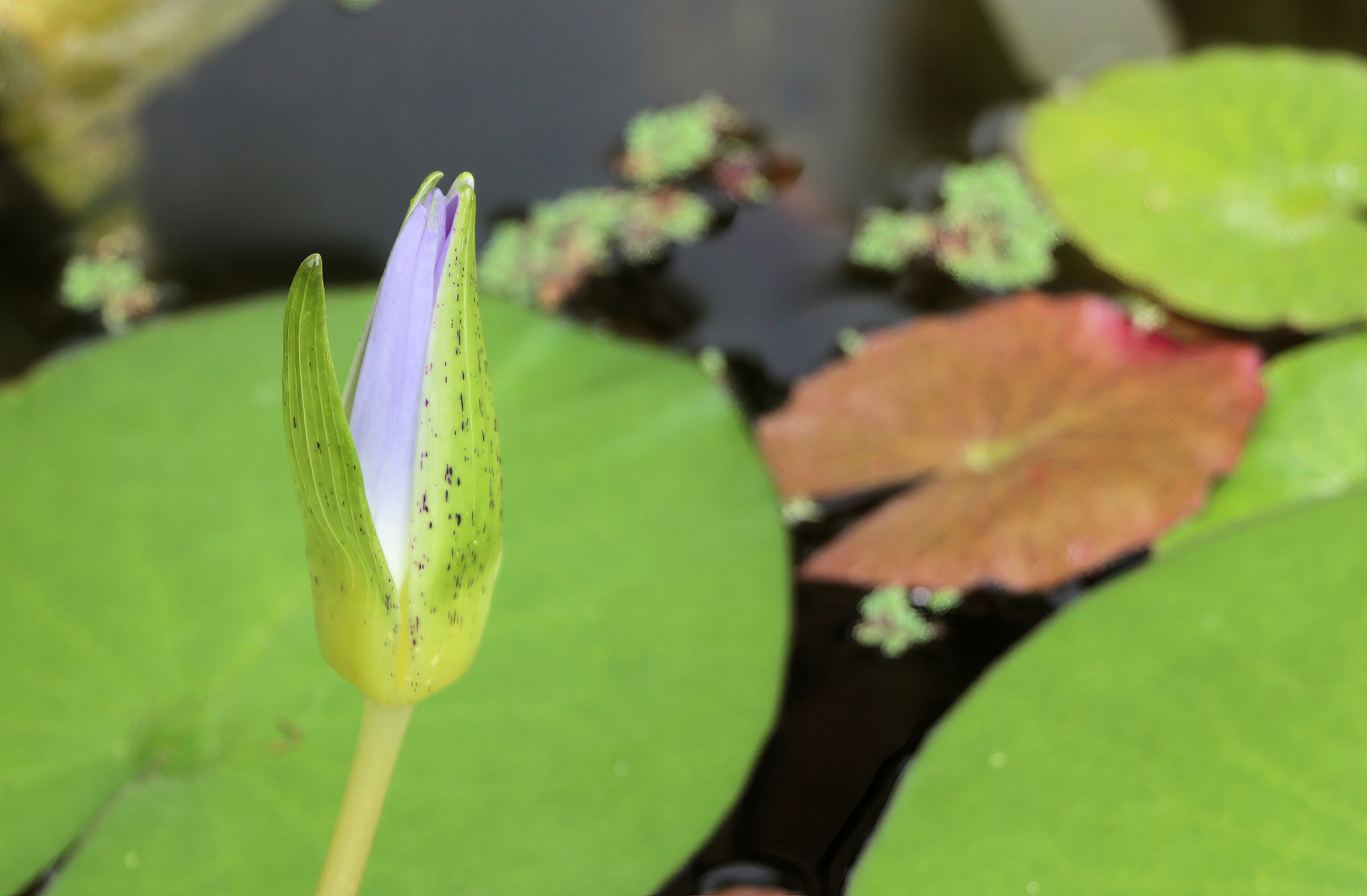
Nymphaea nouchali water lily soon to blossom

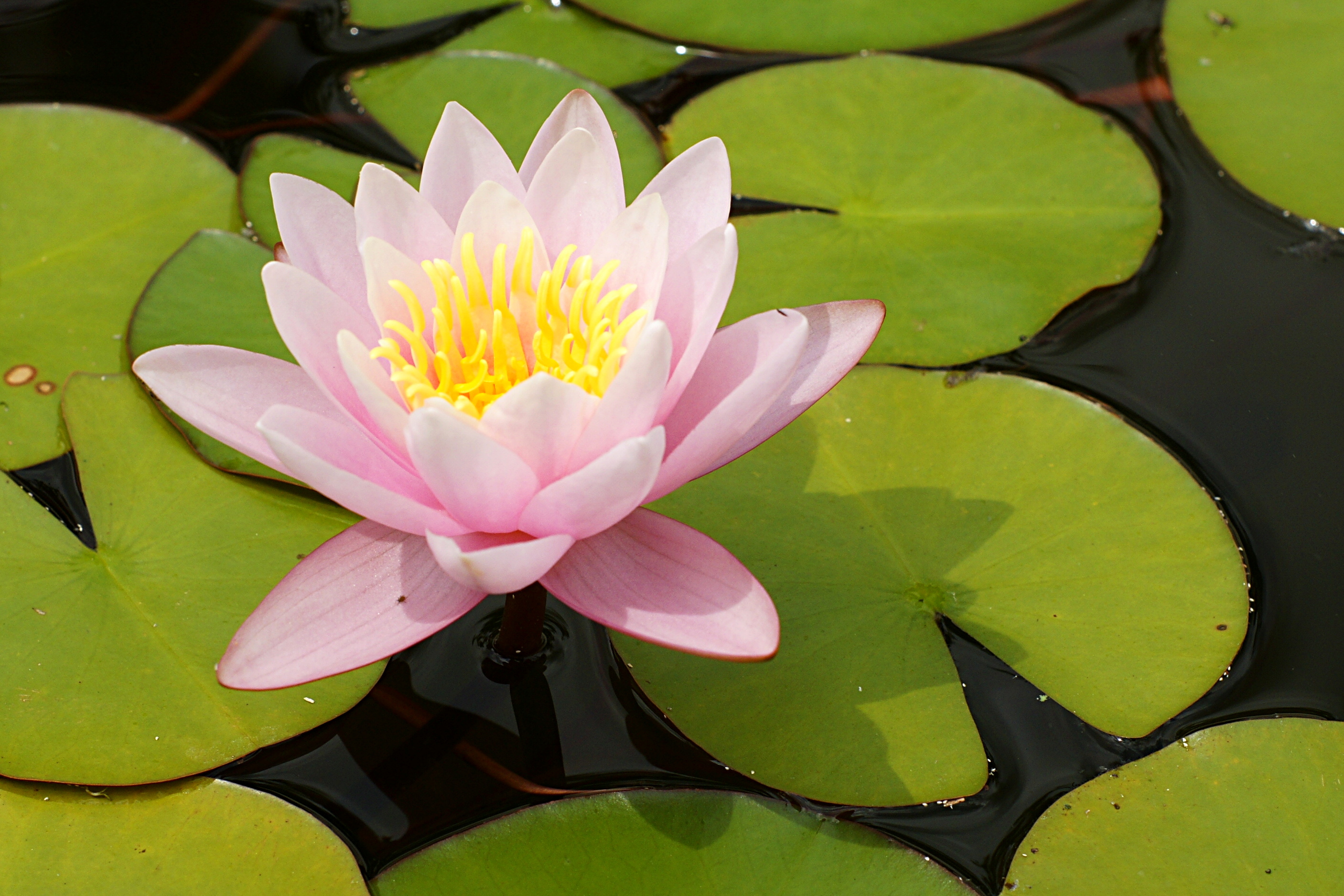
Nymphaea × marliacea Rosea

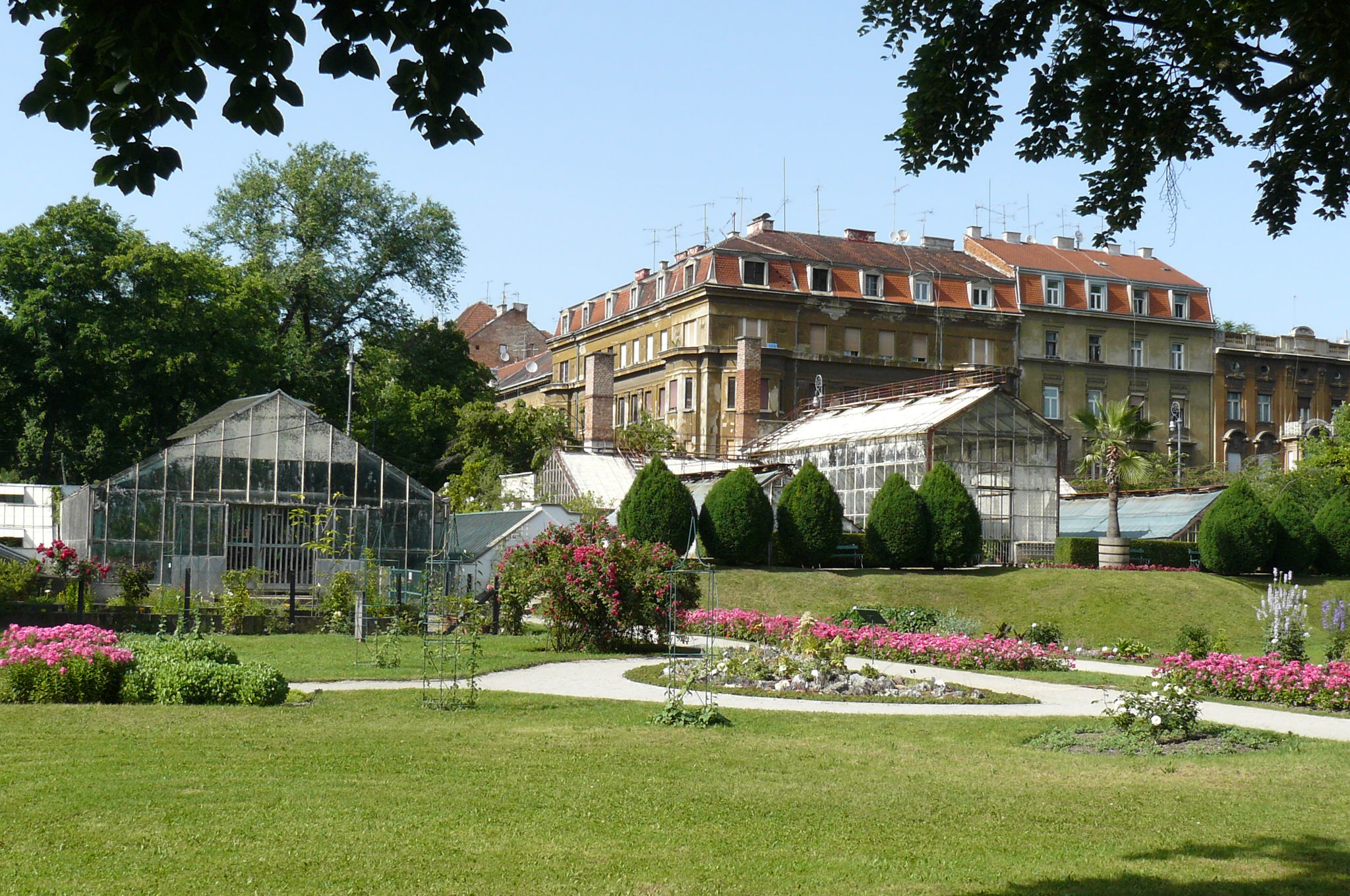
Greenhouse

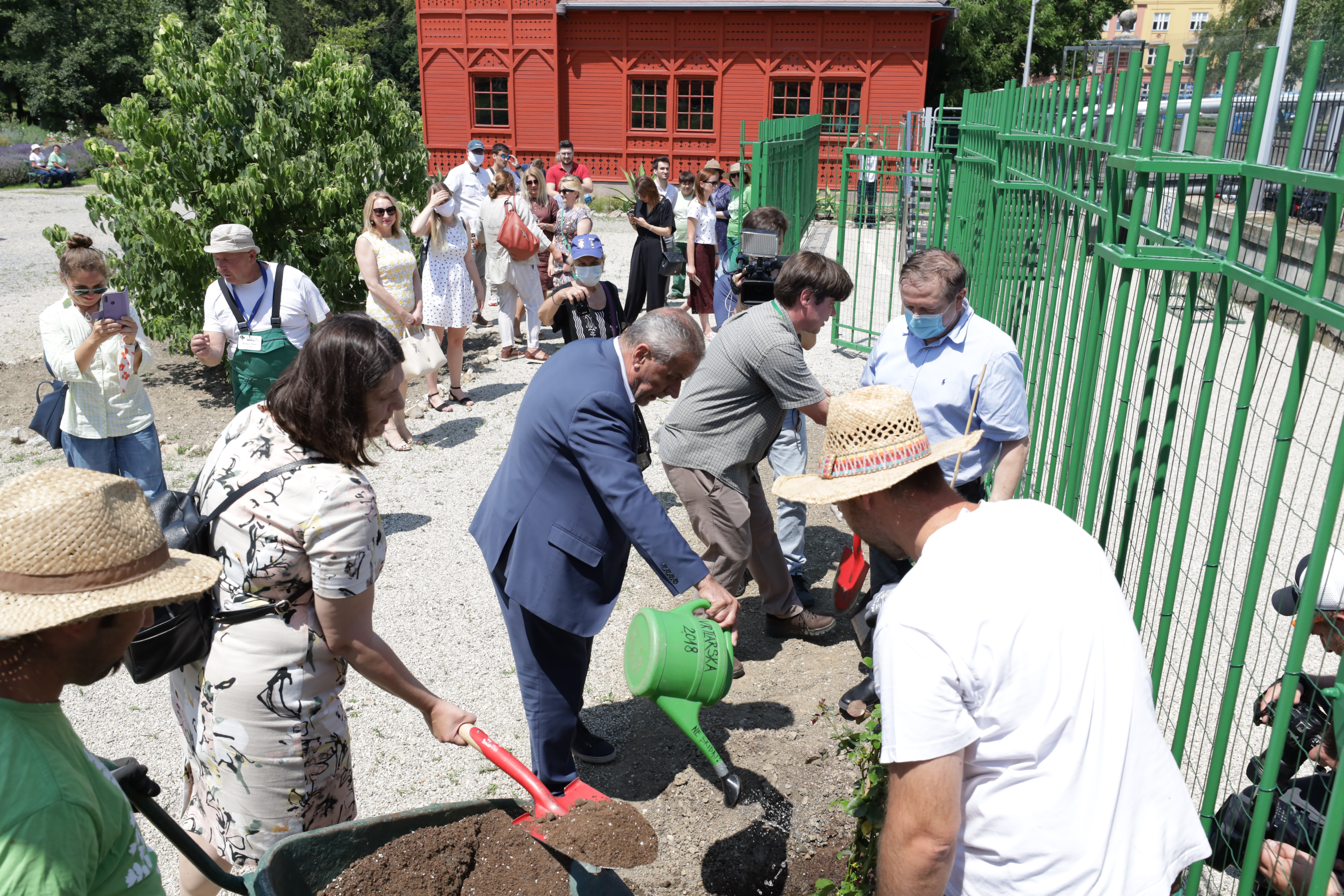
Former mayor, Milan Bandić in work around the garden

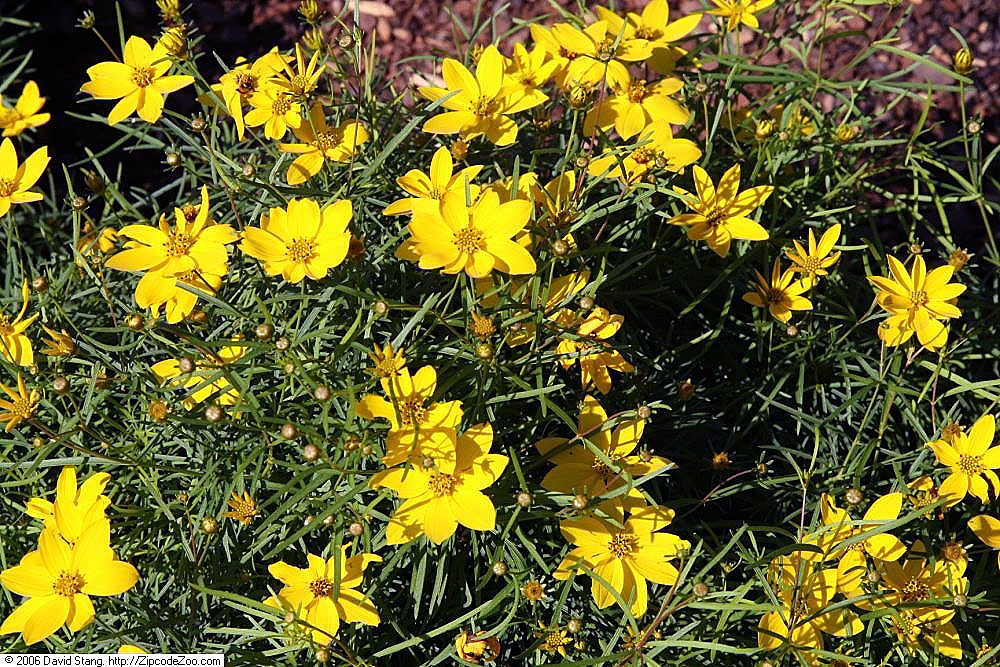
Coreopsis verticillata

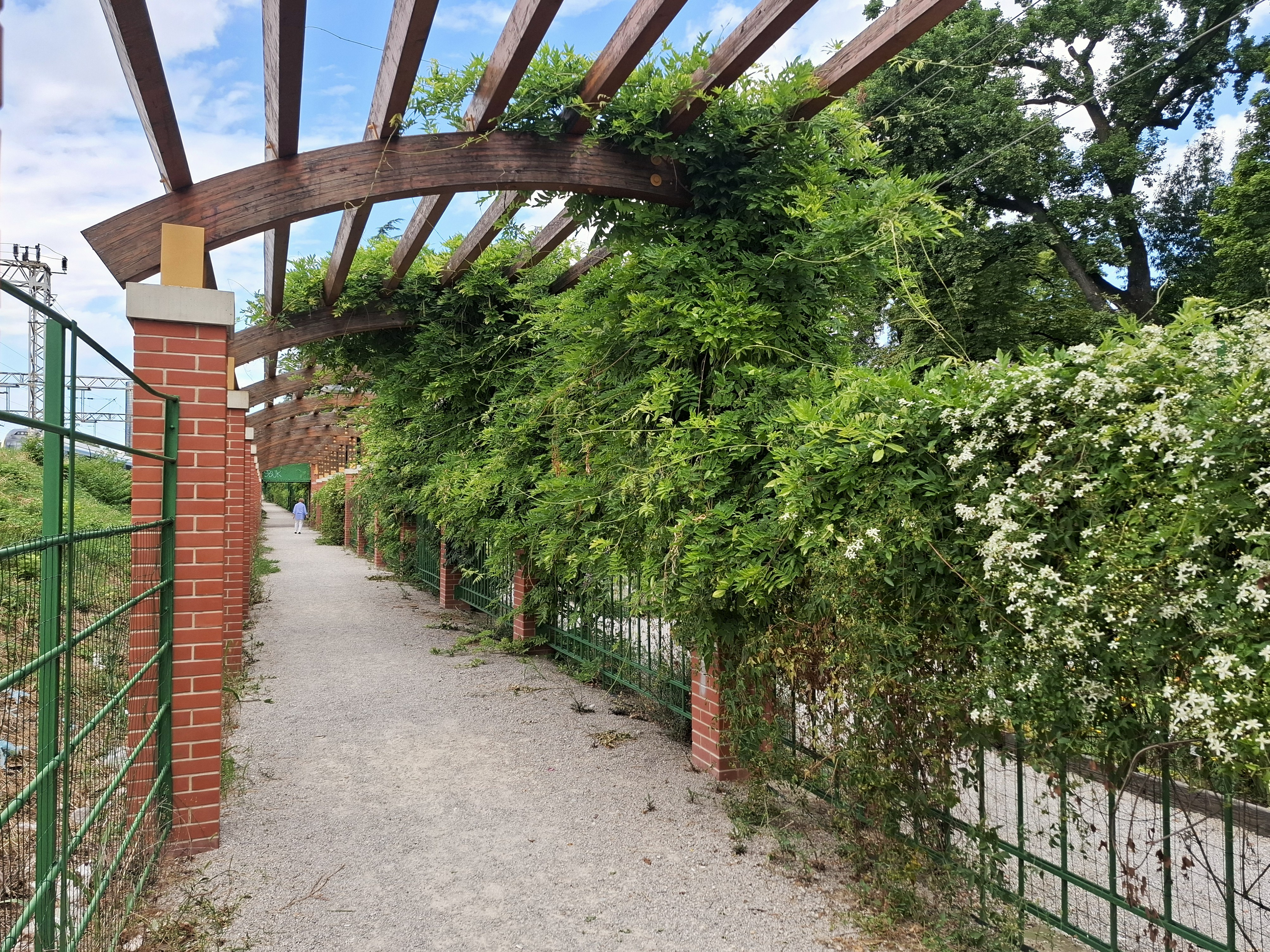
Garden walking trail

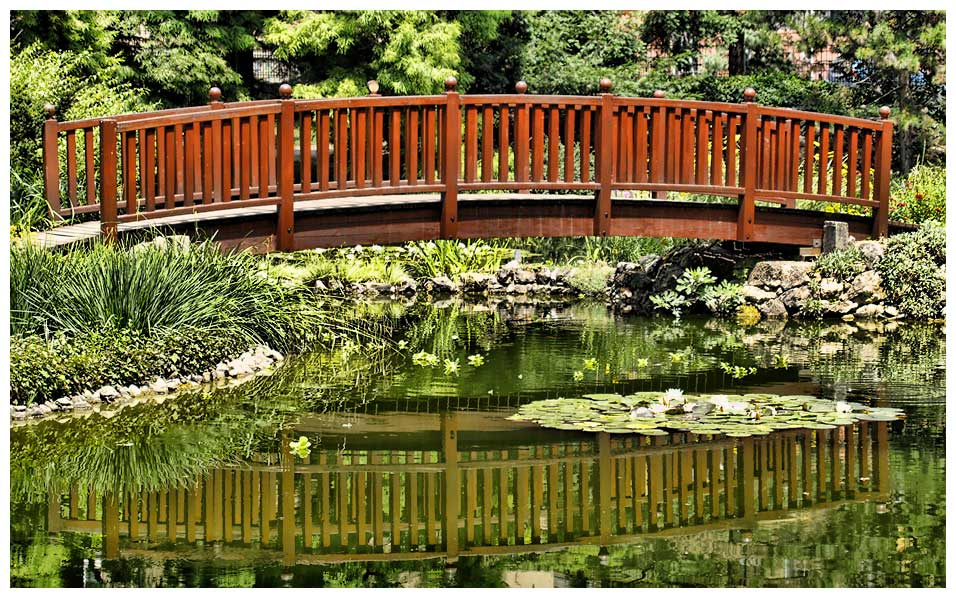
Bridge over the lake

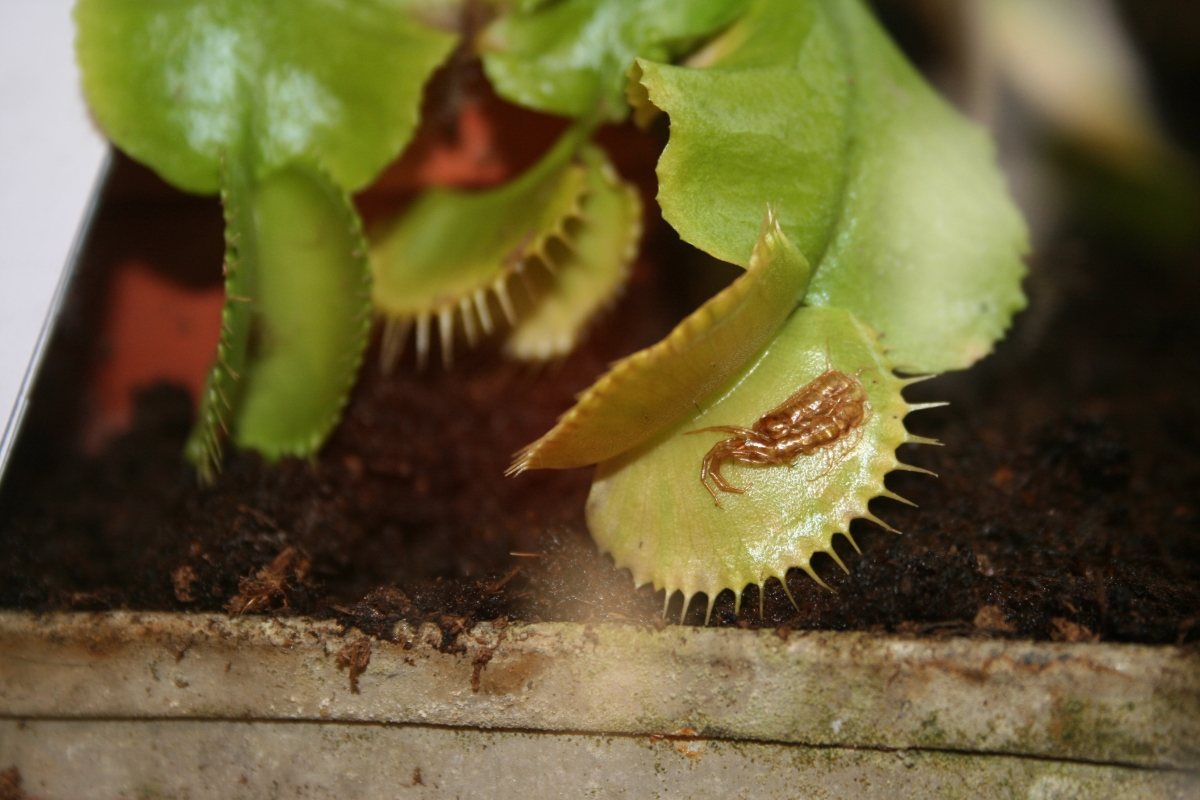
Dionaea muscipula

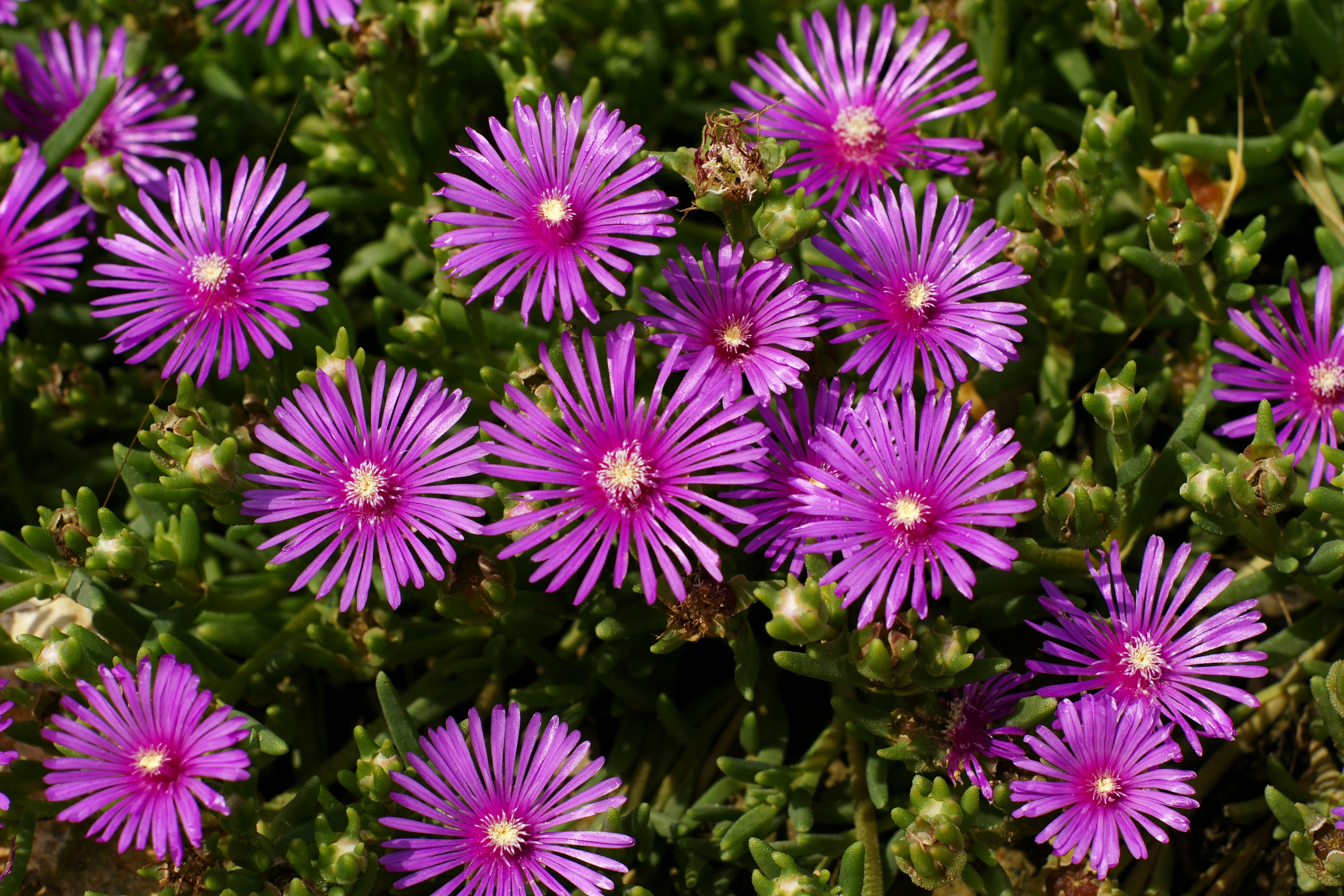
Delosperma cooperi

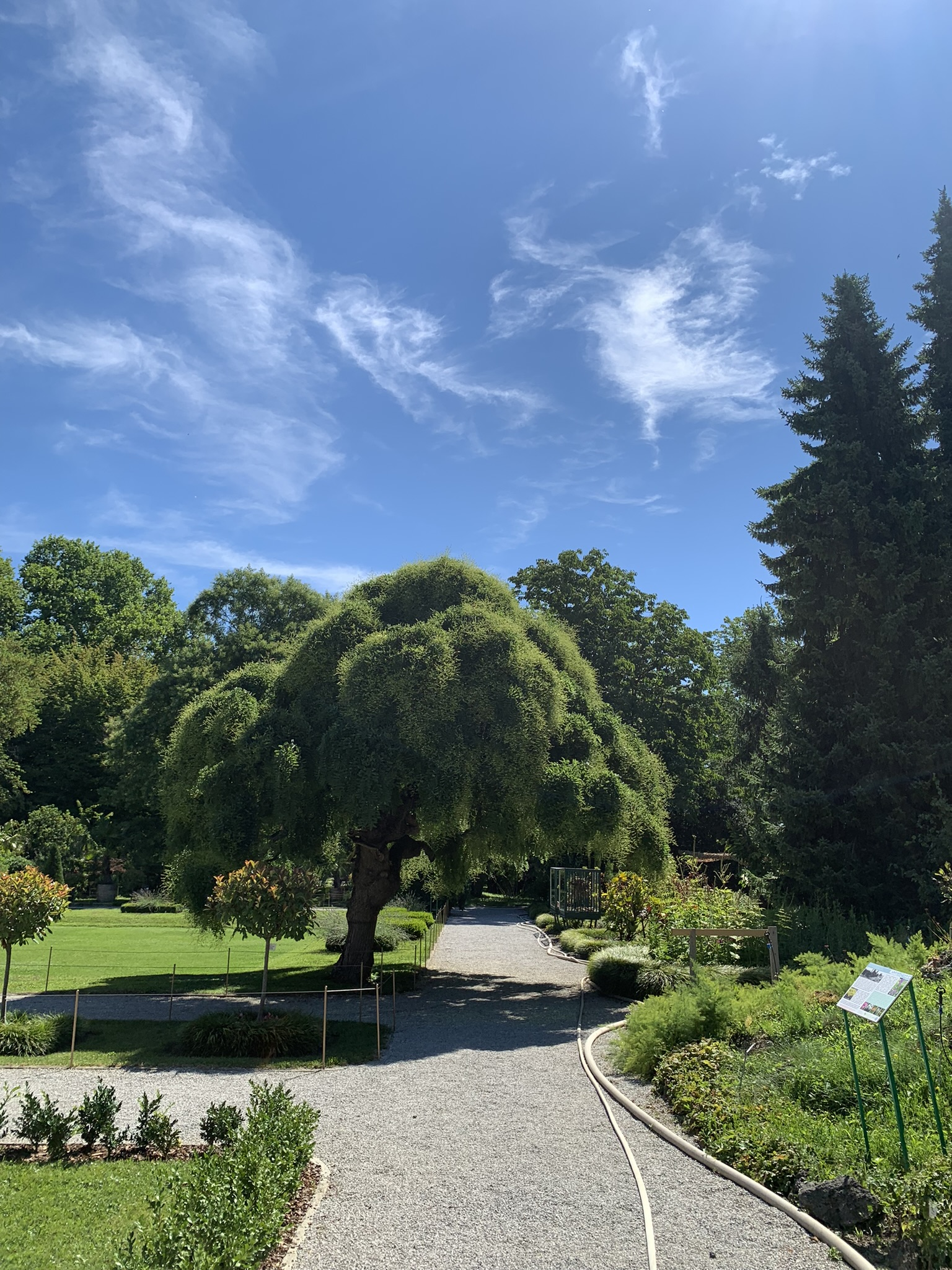
Garden path
