= Petrica Novosel Žic =

Croatian cartographer (1931–2021)

- Born: 13 May 1931; Draga Bašćanska
- Died: 16 January 2021 (aged 89)
- Other name: Petrica Žic-Novosel
- Occupations: Cartographer, geography professor

Petrica Novosel Žic (13 May 1931 – 16 January 2021) was a Croatian cartographer and geography professor at the University of Zagreb.

== Early life ==
Petrica Novosel was born in Draga Bašćanska, on the island Krk. She trained as a teacher in Rijeka. She earned a bachelor's degree in geography at the University of Zagreb in 1959, and a master's degree in 1970. In 1978, she became the first woman in Croatia to earn a PhD in geography, with a dissertation about Krk ("Otok Krk od trajekta do mosta", or "The Island of Krk from the Ferry to the Bridge").

== Career ==
Novosel Žic taught school as a young woman. She was on the faculty at the University of Zagreb from 1979, and served terms as head of the geography department, and head of the cartographic collection. She also led the Institute of Regional Geography and Methodology. She taught in Moscow and Kiev on a faculty exchange. She was president of the Zagreb Geographical Society and secretary of the Croatian Geographical Society. She was on the editorial boards of journals including Radovi Geografskog odsjeka and the journal of the Croatian Academy of Sciences and Arts. She retired in 1999.

Novosel Žic's research focused on the history of Croatian cartography in the 1500s and 1600s, especially on Stjepan Glavač's 1673 map of Croatia.

== Publications ==
- "Krk - otočni centar" (1966, article)
- "VIII. kongres geografa Jugoslavije" (1969, article)
- Indija : potkontinent najvećega kontinenta (1970, book)
- "O Stjepanu Glavaču i njegovoj karti Hrvatske iz 1673. godine" (1973, article)
- "Kuće za odmor na otoku Krku; Vacation on the Island of Krk" (1982, article)
- "O nekim kriterijima izdvajanja turističkih naselja otoka Krka" (1986, article)
- "O razvoju geografije i kartografije" (1987, article)
- Otok Krk od trajekta do mosta : socijalno-geograf. transformacija (1987, book)
- "Mjerenje površina metodom 'Monte-Carlo'" (1988, article, with Željka Richter-Novosel)
- "Problem početnog meridijana i naše geografske karte" (1990, article)
- "'Croatian Cartographers of the 16th and 17th Centuries'" (2005, book chapter, with Željka Richter-Novosel)

== Personal life ==
Novosel Žic died in Zagreb in 2021, aged 89 years.
