= European Biophysics Societies Association =

Non-profit organisation formed in 1984

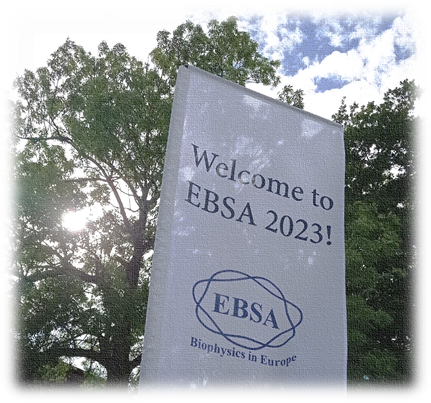

The European Biophysical Societies' Association is a non-profit making organisation (UK Charity Commission no. 1059024), to foster the exchange of scientific information among European biophysicists and biophysicists in general.

EBSA is an association of 33 Biophysical Societies in the European area. EBSA is an adherent member of the International Union for Pure and Applied Biophysics (IUPAB). EBSA maintains close links with Springer-Nature, the publishers of the European Biophysics Journal for which the copyright is owned by EBSA.

== History ==
In October 1980, at a joint conference of the Belgian, German and Netherlands Biophysical Societies in Aachen, a proposal emerged to form an Association of related European societies. In November 1981, at a meeting in Frankfurt, hosted by the German Biophysical Society and attended by representative officers of the Belgian, British, Danish, German, Italian, Netherlands, Swedish and Swiss Biophysical Societies, the concept of a European Biophysical Societies' Association was unanimously endorsed and accepted by all the National Member Societies present. A journal associated with EBSA was also proposed as an eventual objective. An Acting Executive Committee was constituted as follows: President: Anders Ehenberg (Stockholm); Vice-president: W. Kreutz (Freiburg); Secretary: Julius Clauwaert (Wilrijk); Member: Peter Bayley (London).

The first EBSA General Assembly was held in July 1984, during the 8th IUPAB Congress in Bristol. The initial eight adhering societies attended, with new applications from France and Israel, and observers from Bulgaria, Hungary, Norway, Poland, Romania, Spain, USSR and Yugoslavia.

In 1984, The formation of the European Biophysics Journal (formally "Biophysics of Structure and Mechanism". Ed. H. Stieve, Germany), published by Springer Verlag. EBJ is now published by Springer Nature and wholly owned by EBSA, with publication revenues supporting EBSA. An "Encyclopedia of Biophysics", published by Springer-Nature and edited by GKC Roberts and A Watts, is now in its 2nd Edition.

== Committees and governance ==
The EBSA Executive Committee is elected by voting members of the adherent societies at the General Assembly held at the biennial EBSA congresses, and meets biannually, with two meetings at the EBSA congress. The current President (6-year term) is usually the main organizer of the previous EBSA congress, and a President-elect is usually the organizer of the next congress. A Past-President, Secretary, Treasurer are joined by ~12 committee members and co-opted members. The Managing Editor of EBJ is an ex-officio member.

== Conferences and activities ==
Every two years EBSA organizes a European biophysics congress, hosted by a national biophysical society, and located across all parts Europe. The next Congress (2025) will be held in Rome, Italy hosted by SIBPA. In addition, EBSA offers sponsorship to organisers of multi-national meetings, workshops and schools that promote biophysics in Europe. Support can come in the form of grants to the organisers or bursaries to participants. EBSA also offers bursaries (typically 50 – 60) to individual early career scientists to enable them to participate in the biennial EBSA Congresses. Furthermore, new initiatives have been generated, such as support for working visits or bursaries to attend scientific meetings.

=== European Biophysics Congresses ===
Congresses
Year	Title	Location
1971	1st European Biophysics Congress	Baden, Austria
1997	2nd EBSA (Note: first EBSA Congress, although named as the 2nd)	Orleans
2000	3rd EBSA	Munich
2003	4th EBSA	Alicante
2005	5th EBSA	Montpellier – jointly with 15th IUPAB
2007	6th EBSA	London
2009	7th EBSA	Genoa
2011	8th EBSA	Budapest
2013	9th EBSA	Lisbon
2015	10th EBSA	Dresden
2017	11TH EBSA	Edinburgh – jointly with 19th IUPAB
2019	12TH EBSA	Madrid – jointly with 20th IUPAP
2021	13TH EBSA	Vienna
2023	14TH EBSA	Stockholm
2025	15TH EBSA	Rome
2027	16TH EBSA	Berlin – jointly with 21st IUPAB

== List of presidents ==
Presidents
From	To	President	Country
1981	1984	Anders Ehrenberg; Acting President	SE
1984	1987	Anders Ehrenberg	SE
1987	1990	?	
1990	1993	Peter Bayley	UK
1993	1997	Manuel Cortijo	SP
1997	2000	Paul Vigny	FR
2000	2003	Heinz Rütterjans	DE
2003	2005	Bernat Soria	SP
2005	2007	Erick Dufourc	FR
2007	2009	Michael Ferenczi	UK
2009	2011	Alberto Diaspro	IT
2011	2013	Laszlo Matyus	HU
2013	2015	Manuel Prieto	PT
2015	2017	Helmut Grubmüller	DE
2017	2019	Anthony Watts	UK
2019	2021	Jesus Perez-Gil	SP
2021	2023	Elena E. Pohl	AU
2023	2025	Maria Sunnerhagen	SE
2025	2027	Mauro della Serra	IT
