= Meanings of minor-planet names: 80001–81000 =

As minor planet discoveries are confirmed, they are given a permanent number by the IAU's Minor Planet Center (MPC), and the discoverers can then submit names for them, following the IAU's naming conventions. The list below concerns those minor planets in the specified number-range that have received names, and explains the meanings of those names.

Official naming citations of newly named small Solar System bodies are approved and published in a bulletin by IAU's Working Group for Small Bodies Nomenclature (WGSBN). Before May 2021, citations were published in MPC's Minor Planet Circulars for many decades. Recent citations can also be found on the JPL Small-Body Database (SBDB). Until his death in 2016, German astronomer Lutz D. Schmadel compiled these citations into the Dictionary of Minor Planet Names (DMP) and regularly updated the collection.

Based on Paul Herget's The Names of the Minor Planets, Schmadel also researched the unclear origin of numerous asteroids, most of which had been named prior to World War II. This article incorporates text from this source, which is in the public domain: SBDB New namings may only be added to this list below after official publication as the preannouncement of names is condemned. The WGSBN publishes a comprehensive guideline for the naming rules of non-cometary small Solar System bodies.

== 80001–80100 ==
Named minor planet	Provisional	This minor planet was named for...	Ref · Catalog
80008 Danielarhodes	1999 GG_{1}	Daniela Rhodes (born 1946) is an Italian chemical engineer working in scientific research. She was elected Member and Chair of the European Molecular Biology Organization Council and since 2007 has been a Fellow of the Royal Society.	JPL · 80008

== 80101–80200 ==
back to top

Named minor planet	Provisional	This minor planet was named for...	Ref · Catalog
80135 Zanzanini	1999 TA_{11}	Giuseppe Zan Zanini (1794–1869) lived in Val Bavona and Val Foiòi in Ticino, Switzerland. His history is a symbol of the hard life and fragile existence supported by the valley inhabitants of Ticino in 1800.	JPL · 80135
80179 Václavknoll	1999 VK	Václav Knoll (1964–2010) was a Czech astronomer and promoter and popularizer of astronomy, natural sciences and technologies in the Czech city and region of Pardubice and particularly for young people. Since 1994 he has been the chief of the Pardubice's observatory of Baron Arthur Kraus.	JPL · 80179
80180 Elko	1999 VS	The city of Elko in Nevada, United States, home of the National Basque Festival and the Cowboy Poetry Gathering	JPL · 80180
80184 Hekigoto	1999 VX_{22}	Hekigoto Kawahigashi (1873–1937), was a Japanese Haiku poet. He started to compose Haiku at the age of sixteen, inspired by the highly renowned Haiku poet Shiki Masaoka. He later became absorbed in free style Haiku and co-founded the avant-garde Haiku journal So-un.	JPL · 80184

== 80201–80300 ==
back to top

Named minor planet	Provisional	This minor planet was named for...	Ref · Catalog
There are no named minor planets in this number range

== 80301–80400 ==
back to top

Named minor planet	Provisional	This minor planet was named for...	Ref · Catalog
There are no named minor planets in this number range

== 80401–80500 ==
back to top

Named minor planet	Provisional	This minor planet was named for...	Ref · Catalog
80451 Alwoods	2000 AA	Alfred Lee Woods (1911–2004) was American amateur astronomer at the St. Louis Astronomical Society	JPL · 80451

== 80501–80600 ==
back to top

Named minor planet	Provisional	This minor planet was named for...	Ref · Catalog
There are no named minor planets in this number range

== 80601–80700 ==
back to top

Named minor planet	Provisional	This minor planet was named for...	Ref · Catalog
80652 Albertoangela	2000 BB	Alberto Angela (born 1962) is a well-known Italian science writer and the host of a number of popular television programs on science, technology and the environment.	JPL · 80652
80675 Kwentus	2000 BV_{22}	Peter Kwentus (1923–1985) and Virginia Kwentus (1929–2008), members and devoted supporters of the Warren Astronomical Society in Michigan.	JPL · 80675

== 80701–80800 ==
back to top

Named minor planet	Provisional	This minor planet was named for...	Ref · Catalog
There are no named minor planets in this number range

== 80801–80900 ==
back to top

Named minor planet	Provisional	This minor planet was named for...	Ref · Catalog
80801 Yiwu	2000 CP_{98}	Yiwu county, Xinjiang Uyghur Autonomous Region, Northwest China, where many shadow chasers observed the total solar eclipse of 2008 August	JPL · 80801
80807 Jimloudon	2000 CX_{112}	James "Jim" Loudon (1944–1988), American space-science lecturer with the University of Michigan	JPL · 80807
80808 Billmason	2000 CU_{114}	Bill Mason (born 1932), an adhesives and corrosion chemist.	JPL · 80808
80810 Georgewinters	2000 CC_{115}	George Winters (born 1950) is the former Secretary of the Association of Paleontological Suppliers (AAPS) and recipient of the prestigious Sternberg Medal from the AAPS in 2018.	JPL · 80810

== 80901–81000 ==
back to top

Named minor planet	Provisional	This minor planet was named for...	Ref · Catalog
80984 Santomurakami	2000 EO_{15}	Santo Murakami (1912–2005), a Japanese calligrapher and recipient of the Order of Cultural Merit Award in 1998	JPL · 80984

back to top

Preceded by 79,001–80,000	Meanings of minor-planet names List of minor planets: 80,001–81,000	Succeeded by 81,001–82,000
