= Yoshisada Shimizu =

Japanese astronomer

Minor planets discovered: 311
see § List of discovered minor planets

Yoshisada Shimizu (清水 義定, Shimizu Yoshisada; born 1943) is a Japanese amateur astronomer and a prolific discoverer of hundreds of asteroids since 1993. An orthopaedist by profession, he is also known as an astrophotographer.

The central main-belt asteroid 7300 Yoshisada, discovered by astronomer Takeshi Urata in 1992, was named in his honor. The official naming citation was published on 18 August 1997 (M.P.C. 30478).

== List of discovered minor planets ==
List of minor planets discovered by Yoshisada Shimizu

Name	Discovery Date	Listing
6160 Minakata	15 May 1993	list^{[A]}
6834 Hunfeld	11 May 1993	list^{[A]}
6838 Okuda	30 October 1995	list^{[A]}
7031 Kazumiyoshioka	31 October 1994	list^{[A]}
7032 Hitchcock	3 November 1994	list^{[A]}
7036 Kentarohirata	29 January 1995	list^{[A]}
7037 Davidlean	29 January 1995	list^{[A]}
(7135) 1993 VO	5 November 1993	list^{[A]}
7259 Gaithersburg	6 March 1994	list^{[A]}
7264 Hirohatanaka	26 March 1995	list^{[A]}
7307 Takei	13 April 1994	list^{[A]}
7308 Hattori	31 January 1995	list^{[A]}
7502 Arakida	15 November 1996	list^{[A]}
7533 Seiraiji	25 October 1995	list^{[A]}
(7534) 1995 UA_{7}	26 October 1995	list^{[A]}
7536 Fahrenheit	21 November 1995	list^{[A]}
(7609) 1995 WX_{3}	18 November 1995	list^{[A]}
(7619) 1997 AP_{21}	13 January 1997	list^{[A]}
(7662) 1994 RM_{1}	3 September 1994	list^{[A]}
(7667) 1995 BL_{3}	29 January 1995	list^{[A]}
(7676) 1995 WN_{8}	18 November 1995	list^{[A]}
(7709) 1994 RN_{1}	8 September 1994	list^{[A]}
(7712) 1995 TB_{1}	12 October 1995	list^{[A]}
(7785) 1994 QW	29 August 1994	list^{[A]}
(7786) 1994 TB_{15}	14 October 1994	list^{[A]}
(7792) 1995 WZ_{3}	18 November 1995	list^{[A]}
(7841) 1994 UE_{1}	31 October 1994	list^{[A]}
(7893) 1994 XY	2 December 1994	list^{[A]}
(7964) 1995 DD_{2}	23 February 1995	list^{[A]}
(7969) 1997 RP_{3}	5 September 1997	list^{[A]}
(8038) 1993 JG	11 May 1993	list^{[A]}
(8107) 1995 BR_{4}	31 January 1995	list^{[A]}
(8213) 1995 FE	26 March 1995	list^{[A]}
8215 Zanonato	31 March 1995	list^{[A]}
(8226) 1996 TF_{7}	5 October 1996	list^{[A]}
(8312) 1996 TJ_{12}	15 October 1996	list^{[A]}
(8415) 1996 UT	16 October 1996	list^{[A]}
(8427) 1997 TH_{17}	6 October 1997	list^{[A]}
(8559) 1995 QM_{2}	25 August 1995	list^{[A]}
8564 Anomalocaris	17 October 1995	list^{[A]}
(8714) 1995 OT	24 July 1995	list^{[A]}
(8715) 1995 OX_{1}	26 July 1995	list^{[A]}
(8718) 1995 UC_{8}	27 October 1995	list^{[A]}
8889 Mockturtle	31 July 1994	list^{[A]}
(8894) 1995 PV	2 August 1995	list^{[A]}
(8896) 1995 QG_{2}	24 August 1995	list^{[A]}
8903 Paulcruikshank	26 October 1995	list^{[A]}
(9085) 1995 QH_{2}	24 August 1995	list^{[A]}
(9089) 1995 UC_{7}	26 October 1995	list^{[A]}
(9113) 1997 CN_{5}	3 February 1997	list^{[A]}
(9219) 1995 WO_{8}	18 November 1995	list^{[A]}
(9390) 1994 NJ_{1}	12 July 1994	list^{[A]}
(9401) 1994 TS_{3}	13 October 1994	list^{[A]}
(9643) 1994 RX	2 September 1994	list^{[A]}
(9644) 1994 WQ_{3}	26 November 1994	list^{[A]}
9777 Enterprise	31 July 1994	list^{[A]}
9780 Bandersnatch	25 September 1994	list^{[A]}
9781 Jubjubbird	31 October 1994	list^{[A]}
9986 Hirokun	12 July 1996	list^{[A]}
10209 Izanaki	24 August 1997	list^{[A]}
(10229) 1997 WR_{3}	19 November 1997	list^{[A]}
10385 Amaterasu	15 October 1996	list^{[A]}
(10391) 1997 RR_{3}	5 September 1997	list^{[A]}
10412 Tsukuyomi	21 December 1997	list^{[A]}
(10580) 1995 OV	24 July 1995	list^{[A]}
10613 Kushinadahime	4 September 1997	list^{[A]}
(10614) 1997 UH_{1}	21 October 1997	list^{[A]}
10627 Ookuninushi	19 January 1998	list^{[A]}
(10868) 1996 RF_{5}	3 September 1996	list^{[A]}
(10871) 1996 TG_{7}	5 October 1996	list^{[A]}
10877 Jiangnan Tianchi	16 October 1996	list^{[A]}
10888 Yamatano-orochi	6 December 1996	list^{[A]}
(10896) 1997 UZ_{14}	26 October 1997	list^{[A]}
(10933) 1998 DC_{24}	17 February 1998	list^{[A]}
(10936) 1998 FN_{11}	22 March 1998	list^{[A]}
(10945) 1999 GS_{9}	14 April 1999	list^{[A]}
(11088) 1993 UN	19 October 1993	list^{[A]}
(11097) 1994 UD_{1}	31 October 1994	list^{[A]}
(11106) 1995 UK_{3}	17 October 1995	list^{[A]}
(11113) 1995 WW_{3}	18 November 1995	list^{[A]}
(11157) 1998 AJ	2 January 1998	list^{[A]}
(11327) 1995 SL_{2}	17 September 1995	list^{[A]}
(11330) 1995 WZ_{6}	18 November 1995	list^{[A]}
(11599) 1995 QR	16 August 1995	list^{[A]}
(11608) 1995 WU_{4}	18 November 1995	list^{[A]}
(11613) 1995 YN_{4}	23 December 1995	list^{[A]}
(11634) 1996 XU_{30}	12 December 1996	list^{[A]}
(11641) 1997 AP_{12}	7 January 1997	list^{[A]}
(11642) 1997 AN_{21}	13 January 1997	list^{[A]}
(11649) 1997 BR_{6}	29 January 1997	list^{[A]}
(11671) 1998 BG_{4}	21 January 1998	list^{[A]}
(11683) 1998 FO_{11}	22 March 1998	list^{[A]}
(11742) 1999 JZ_{5}	7 May 1999	list^{[A]}
(11961) 1994 PO	3 August 1994	list^{[A]}
(11982) 1995 UF_{6}	25 October 1995	list^{[A]}
(12425) 1995 VG_{2}	12 November 1995	list^{[A]}
(12570) 1998 WV_{5}	18 November 1998	list^{[A]}
(12831) 1997 BS_{6}	29 January 1997	list^{[A]}
(12849) 1997 QD_{2}	27 August 1997	list^{[A]}
(12921) 1998 WZ_{5}	20 November 1998	list^{[A]}
(13139) 1994 VD_{2}	3 November 1994	list^{[A]}
(13228) 1997 SJ_{25}	29 September 1997	list^{[A]}
(13371) 1998 VH_{5}	8 November 1998	list^{[A]}
(13621) 1995 GC_{7}	1 April 1995	list^{[A]}
(13685) 1997 QG_{4}	27 August 1997	list^{[A]}
(14017) 1994 NS	4 July 1994	list^{[A]}
(14029) 1994 UC_{1}	31 October 1994	list^{[A]}
(14099) 1997 RQ_{3}	5 September 1997	list^{[A]}
(14102) 1997 SG_{25}	29 September 1997	list^{[A]}
(14170) 1998 VF_{6}	11 November 1998	list^{[A]}
(14171) 1998 VO_{6}	11 November 1998	list^{[A]}
(14489) 1994 UW	31 October 1994	list^{[A]}
(14493) 1994 WP_{3}	26 November 1994	list^{[A]}
(14534) 1997 QE_{2}	27 August 1997	list^{[A]}
(14545) 1997 SK_{25}	29 September 1997	list^{[A]}
(14924) 1994 VZ	3 November 1994	list^{[A]}
(14936) 1995 BU_{2}	27 January 1995	list^{[A]}
(14992) 1997 UY_{14}	26 October 1997	list^{[A]}
(14993) 1997 UC_{15}	26 October 1997	list^{[A]}
(15070) 1999 BK_{8}	20 January 1999	list^{[A]}
(15357) 1995 FM	26 March 1995	list^{[A]}
(15405) 1997 WJ_{7}	19 November 1997	list^{[A]}
(15496) 1999 DQ_{3}	20 February 1999	list^{[A]}
(15831) 1995 BG_{3}	29 January 1995	list^{[A]}
(15844) 1995 UQ_{5}	20 October 1995	list^{[A]}
(15873) 1996 TH_{7}	5 October 1996	list^{[A]}
(15879) 1996 XH_{6}	3 December 1996	list^{[A]}
(15926) 1997 VP_{6}	5 November 1997	list^{[A]}
(15932) 1997 XL_{5}	2 December 1997	list^{[A]}
(15981) 1998 UP_{6}	18 October 1998	list^{[A]}
(16722) 1995 WG_{7}	24 November 1995	list^{[A]}
(16751) 1996 QG_{1}	18 August 1996	list^{[A]}
(16752) 1996 QP_{1}	22 August 1996	list^{[A]}
(16767) 1996 US	16 October 1996	list^{[A]}
(16773) 1996 VO_{1}	6 November 1996	list^{[A]}
(16774) 1996 VP_{1}	6 November 1996	list^{[A]}
(16786) 1997 AT_{1}	2 January 1997	list^{[A]}
(16821) 1997 VZ_{4}	5 November 1997	list^{[A]}
(16822) 1997 VA_{5}	5 November 1997	list^{[A]}
(16830) 1997 WQ_{7}	19 November 1997	list^{[A]}
(16863) 1997 YJ_{16}	31 December 1997	list^{[A]}
(16875) 1998 BD_{4}	20 January 1998	list^{[A]}
(16885) 1998 BX_{25}	25 January 1998	list^{[A]}
(17648) 1996 UU	16 October 1996	list^{[A]}
17712 Fatherwilliam	19 November 1997	list^{[A]}
(17719) 1997 XV_{1}	2 December 1997	list^{[A]}
17759 Hatta	17 February 1998	list^{[A]}
(17918) 1999 GE_{6}	14 April 1999	list^{[A]}
17942 Whiterabbit	11 May 1999	list^{[A]}
(18474) 1995 WV_{3}	18 November 1995	list^{[A]}
(18533) 1996 XJ_{6}	3 December 1996	list^{[A]}
(18538) 1996 XY_{18}	6 December 1996	list^{[A]}
(18552) 1997 AM_{21}	13 January 1997	list^{[A]}
(18594) 1998 BJ	16 January 1998	list^{[A]}
(18651) 1998 FP_{11}	22 March 1998	list^{[A]}
(19312) 1996 VR_{7}	15 November 1996	list^{[A]}
(19377) 1998 BE_{4}	21 January 1998	list^{[A]}

Name	Discovery Date	Listing
(20104) 1995 OU	24 July 1995	list^{[A]}
(20122) 1995 WH_{17}	28 November 1995	list^{[A]}
(21227) 1995 QS	16 August 1995	list^{[A]}
(21592) 1998 VJ_{5}	8 November 1998	list^{[A]}
(22018) 1999 XK_{105}	8 December 1999	list^{[A]}
(22393) 1994 QV	29 August 1994	list^{[A]}
(22407) 1995 SK_{2}	17 September 1995	list^{[A]}
(22444) 1996 TK_{12}	15 October 1996	list^{[A]}
(22504) 1997 TD_{17}	6 October 1997	list^{[A]}
(22522) 1998 EF_{6}	2 March 1998	list^{[A]}
(23594) 1995 VJ_{2}	13 November 1995	list^{[A]}
(24185) 1999 XM_{14}	3 December 1999	list^{[A]}
(24855) 1995 YM_{4}	22 December 1995	list^{[A]}
(24895) 1997 AC_{13}	9 January 1997	list^{[A]}
(25260) 1998 VN_{5}	8 November 1998	list^{[A]}
(25400) 1999 VU_{20}	9 November 1999	list^{[A]}
(26153) 1994 UY	31 October 1994	list^{[A]}
(26218) 1997 WJ_{13}	24 November 1997	list^{[A]}
(26361) 1999 AJ_{5}	10 January 1999	list^{[A]}
(26872) 1993 YR	18 December 1993	list^{[A]}
(26890) 1995 BC_{4}	27 January 1995	list^{[A]}
(26989) 1997 WO_{7}	19 November 1997	list^{[A]}
(26994) 1997 XU_{1}	2 December 1997	list^{[A]}
(26995) 1997 XS_{11}	5 December 1997	list^{[A]}
(27223) 1999 GC_{5}	7 April 1999	list^{[A]}
(27847) 1994 UT	31 October 1994	list^{[A]}
(27848) 1994 UZ	31 October 1994	list^{[A]}
(27954) 1997 QB_{4}	27 August 1997	list^{[A]}
(27965) 1997 SH_{25}	29 September 1997	list^{[A]}
(28008) 1997 XR_{11}	5 December 1997	list^{[A]}
(28024) 1998 BT_{14}	25 January 1998	list^{[A]}
(28032) 1998 DZ_{23}	17 February 1998	list^{[A]}
(28181) 1998 WW_{5}	19 November 1998	list^{[A]}
(28230) 1999 AH_{5}	10 January 1999	list^{[A]}
(28231) 1999 AL_{5}	10 January 1999	list^{[A]}
(28362) 1999 GP_{5}	7 April 1999	list^{[A]}
(29343) 1995 CK_{10}	1 February 1995	list^{[A]}
(29494) 1997 WL_{7}	19 November 1997	list^{[A]}
(29496) 1997 WE_{8}	19 November 1997	list^{[A]}
(29564) 1998 ED_{6}	2 March 1998	list^{[A]}
(29636) 1998 VH_{6}	11 November 1998	list^{[A]}
(29821) 1999 DP_{1}	17 February 1999	list^{[A]}
(29823) 1999 DS_{3}	20 February 1999	list^{[A]}
(29871) 1999 GE_{5}	7 April 1999	list^{[A]}
(30965) 1994 XW	2 December 1994	list^{[A]}
(31111) 1997 PN_{5}	11 August 1997	list^{[A]}
(31176) 1997 XL_{9}	2 December 1997	list^{[A]}
(31193) 1997 YP_{16}	31 December 1997	list^{[A]}
(31260) 1998 EE_{6}	2 March 1998	list^{[A]}
(31542) 1999 DR_{3}	20 February 1999	list^{[A]}
(31610) 1999 GC_{6}	14 April 1999	list^{[A]}
(33030) 1997 QB_{2}	27 August 1997	list^{[A]}
(33041) 1997 TG_{17}	6 October 1997	list^{[A]}
(33045) 1997 UF_{1}	21 October 1997	list^{[A]}
(33046) 1997 UF_{2}	21 October 1997	list^{[A]}
(33055) 1997 UB_{15}	26 October 1997	list^{[A]}
(33107) 1997 YL_{16}	31 December 1997	list^{[A]}
(33540) 1999 JH_{3}	7 May 1999	list^{[A]}
(33541) 1999 JF_{6}	11 May 1999	list^{[A]}
(34438) 2000 SV_{44}	26 September 2000	list^{[A]}
(35393) 1997 XJ_{5}	2 December 1997	list^{[A]}
(35428) 1998 BS_{2}	19 January 1998	list^{[A]}
(35572) 1998 HW_{6}	19 April 1998	list^{[A]}
(35681) 1999 BC_{2}	16 January 1999	list^{[A]}
(35771) 1999 JE_{6}	11 May 1999	list^{[A]}
(37794) 1997 WP_{7}	19 November 1997	list^{[A]}
(37796) 1997 WK_{13}	24 November 1997	list^{[A]}
(37816) 1998 BT_{2}	19 January 1998	list^{[A]}
(37817) 1998 BV_{2}	19 January 1998	list^{[A]}
(37824) 1998 BU_{14}	25 January 1998	list^{[A]}
(39721) 1996 VU_{7}	15 November 1996	list^{[A]}
(39826) 1998 BY_{2}	19 January 1998	list^{[A]}
(39828) 1998 BH_{4}	21 January 1998	list^{[A]}
(39866) 1998 DB_{24}	17 February 1998	list^{[A]}
(39879) 1998 EK_{8}	3 March 1998	list^{[A]}
(40237) 1998 VM_{6}	11 November 1998	list^{[A]}
(42532) 1995 OR	24 July 1995	list^{[A]}
(42561) 1996 XK_{6}	3 December 1996	list^{[A]}
(43018) 1999 VY_{2}	4 November 1999	list^{[A]}
(43021) 1999 VT_{5}	4 November 1999	list^{[A]}
(43900) 1995 VH_{2}	13 November 1995	list^{[A]}
(43909) 1995 WB_{9}	28 November 1995	list^{[A]}
(43959) 1997 CB_{26}	12 February 1997	list^{[A]}
(44006) 1997 TF_{17}	6 October 1997	list^{[A]}
(44029) 1998 BK_{4}	21 January 1998	list^{[A]}
(44354) 1998 SS_{2}	16 September 1998	list^{[A]}
(44888) 1999 VJ_{5}	4 November 1999	list^{[A]}
(45144) 1999 XA_{104}	7 December 1999	list^{[A]}
(46647) 1995 QP_{3}	28 August 1995	list^{[A]}
(46654) 1995 UB_{8}	26 October 1995	list^{[A]}
(46735) 1997 UG_{1}	21 October 1997	list^{[A]}
(47019) 1998 VM_{5}	8 November 1998	list^{[A]}
(48809) 1997 VX_{4}	4 November 1997	list^{[A]}
(49461) 1999 AK_{5}	10 January 1999	list^{[A]}
(49623) 1999 GB_{5}	7 April 1999	list^{[A]}
(51341) 2000 QP_{26}	23 August 2000	list^{[A]}
(52427) 1994 PH	2 August 1994	list^{[A]}
(52469) 1995 QV_{1}	20 August 1995	list^{[A]}
(52592) 1997 QC_{2}	27 August 1997	list^{[A]}
(52593) 1997 QF_{2}	27 August 1997	list^{[A]}
(52621) 1997 VW_{4}	4 November 1997	list^{[A]}
(53028) 1998 WX_{5}	20 November 1998	list^{[A]}
(53289) 1999 GD_{5}	7 April 1999	list^{[A]}
(53447) 1999 XL_{105}	8 December 1999	list^{[A]}
(55871) 1997 UE_{1}	21 October 1997	list^{[A]}
(55877) 1997 VZ_{6}	4 November 1997	list^{[A]}
(56086) 1999 AA_{21}	13 January 1999	list^{[A]}
(56284) 1999 LA_{2}	5 June 1999	list^{[A]}
(58355) 1995 FN	26 March 1995	list^{[A]}
(58589) 1997 SF_{25}	29 September 1997	list^{[A]}
(58676) 1997 YN_{16}	31 December 1997	list^{[A]}
(58688) 1998 BJ_{4}	21 January 1998	list^{[A]}
(59070) 1998 VG_{6}	11 November 1998	list^{[A]}
(61469) 2000 QJ_{35}	23 August 2000	list^{[A]}
(65782) 1995 UG	16 October 1995	list^{[A]}
(65874) 1997 WL_{13}	24 November 1997	list^{[A]}
(66268) 1999 JJ_{3}	7 May 1999	list^{[A]}
(67161) 2000 AA_{205}	8 January 2000	list^{[A]}
(69590) 1998 EL_{8}	3 March 1998	list^{[A]}
(69951) 1998 VK_{6}	11 November 1998	list^{[A]}
(71004) 1999 XF_{38}	3 December 1999	list^{[A]}
(73956) 1997 VQ_{6}	5 November 1997	list^{[A]}
(75055) 1999 VX_{2}	4 November 1999	list^{[A]}
(75309) 1999 XE_{38}	3 December 1999	list^{[A]}
(79791) 1998 VK_{5}	8 November 1998	list^{[A]}
(79794) 1998 VN_{6}	11 November 1998	list^{[A]}
(80183) 1999 VT_{20}	9 November 1999	list^{[A]}
(80339) 1999 XB_{104}	7 December 1999	list^{[A]}
(85329) 1995 PQ	2 August 1995	list^{[A]}
(85532) 1997 WD_{21}	23 November 1997	list^{[A]}
(90881) 1996 XN_{6}	3 December 1996	list^{[A]}
(90949) 1997 VB_{5}	6 November 1997	list^{[A]}
(90995) 1998 AK	2 January 1998	list^{[A]}
(91218) 1999 AM_{5}	10 January 1999	list^{[A]}
(96350) 1997 UA_{15}	26 October 1997	list^{[A]}
(97065) 1999 VV_{20}	9 November 1999	list^{[A]}
(100480) 1996 UK	16 October 1996	list^{[A]}
(100612) 1997 SL_{25}	29 September 1997	list^{[A]}
(100626) 1997 UE_{2}	21 October 1997	list^{[A]}
(100642) 1997 VV_{4}	4 November 1997	list^{[A]}
(100674) 1997 XX_{1}	2 December 1997	list^{[A]}
(101409) 1998 VQ_{6}	11 November 1998	list^{[A]}
(101496) 1998 XM_{3}	9 December 1998	list^{[A]}
(102620) 1999 VX_{23}	9 November 1999	list^{[A]}
(120576) 1995 QK_{2}	25 August 1995	list^{[A]}
(129609) 1997 YO_{16}	31 December 1997	list^{[A]}
(136847) 1998 BC_{4}	20 January 1998	list^{[A]}
(137046) 1998 VE_{6}	11 November 1998	list^{[A]}
(164670) 1996 XM_{6}	3 December 1996	list^{[A]}
(168394) 1998 BX_{2}	19 January 1998	list^{[A]}
(171521) 1999 CH_{3}	7 February 1999	list^{[A]}
(190315) 1997 VY_{4}	5 November 1997	list^{[A]}
(192887) 1999 XZ_{103}	3 December 1999	list^{[A]}
(219132) 1998 VP_{6}	11 November 1998	list^{[A]}
Co-discovery made with:^{A} T. Urata

== See also ==
- List of minor planet discoverers § Y. Shimizu
