= List of minor planets: 80001–81000 =

The following is a partial list of minor planets, running from minor-planet number 80001 through 81000, inclusive. The primary data for this and other partial lists is based on JPL's "Small-Body Orbital Elements" and data available from the Minor Planet Center. Critical list information is also provided by the MPC, unless otherwise specified from Lowell Observatory. A detailed description of the table's columns and additional sources are given on the main page including a complete list of every page in this series, and a statistical break-up on the dynamical classification of minor planets.

Also see the summary list of all named bodies in numerical and alphabetical order, and the corresponding naming citations for the number range of this particular list. New namings may only be added to this list after official publication, as the preannouncement of names is condemned by the Working Group for Small Bodies Nomenclature of the International Astronomical Union.

Near-Earth obj.	MBA (inner)	MBA (outer)	Centaur
Mars-crosser	MBA (middle)	Jupiter trojan	Trans-Neptunian obj.
Unclassified

== 80001–80100 ==
Designation			Discovery			Properties		Ref
Permanent	Provisional	Named after	Date	Site	Discoverer(s)	Category	Diam.	Ref
80001	1999 FX_{38}	—	March 20, 1999	Socorro	LINEAR	·	6.7 km	MPC · JPL
80002	1999 FR_{43}	—	March 20, 1999	Socorro	LINEAR	·	3.4 km	MPC · JPL
80003	1999 FW_{50}	—	March 20, 1999	Socorro	LINEAR	·	8.8 km	MPC · JPL
80004	1999 FH_{54}	—	March 20, 1999	Socorro	LINEAR	·	3.5 km	MPC · JPL
80005	1999 FK_{55}	—	March 20, 1999	Socorro	LINEAR	·	4.2 km	MPC · JPL
80006	1999 FN_{55}	—	March 20, 1999	Socorro	LINEAR	·	6.9 km	MPC · JPL
80007	1999 FE_{61}	—	March 22, 1999	Anderson Mesa	LONEOS	·	6.0 km	MPC · JPL
80008 Danielarhodes	1999 GG_{1}	Danielarhodes	April 4, 1999	San Marcello	L. Tesi, A. Boattini	EOS	5.0 km	MPC · JPL
80009	1999 GD_{2}	—	April 8, 1999	Modra	L. Kornoš, Š. Gajdoš	EOS	6.3 km	MPC · JPL
80010	1999 GQ_{2}	—	April 9, 1999	Oaxaca	Roe, J. M.	EOS	4.5 km	MPC · JPL
80011	1999 GE_{3}	—	April 7, 1999	Kitt Peak	Spacewatch	KOR	2.9 km	MPC · JPL
80012	1999 GT_{4}	—	April 11, 1999	Fountain Hills	C. W. Juels	THM	7.8 km	MPC · JPL
80013	1999 GM_{15}	—	April 15, 1999	Kitt Peak	Spacewatch	·	3.7 km	MPC · JPL
80014	1999 GN_{16}	—	April 9, 1999	Socorro	LINEAR	EOS	7.3 km	MPC · JPL
80015	1999 GT_{21}	—	April 15, 1999	Socorro	LINEAR	·	9.2 km	MPC · JPL
80016	1999 GQ_{32}	—	April 10, 1999	Socorro	LINEAR	·	1.4 km	MPC · JPL
80017	1999 GQ_{39}	—	April 12, 1999	Socorro	LINEAR	·	4.8 km	MPC · JPL
80018	1999 GE_{46}	—	April 12, 1999	Socorro	LINEAR	·	4.4 km	MPC · JPL
80019	1999 HL_{2}	—	April 23, 1999	Višnjan Observatory	K. Korlević, M. Jurić	H	2.1 km	MPC · JPL
80020	1999 HA_{4}	—	April 16, 1999	Kitt Peak	Spacewatch	slow	4.8 km	MPC · JPL
80021	1999 HR_{5}	—	April 17, 1999	Kitt Peak	Spacewatch	·	6.5 km	MPC · JPL
80022	1999 JS	—	May 4, 1999	Xinglong	SCAP	H	1.4 km	MPC · JPL
80023	1999 JY_{1}	—	May 8, 1999	Catalina	CSS	H	1.1 km	MPC · JPL
80024	1999 JJ_{4}	—	May 10, 1999	Socorro	LINEAR	H	1.4 km	MPC · JPL
80025	1999 JB_{7}	—	May 8, 1999	Catalina	CSS	·	6.2 km	MPC · JPL
80026	1999 JH_{8}	—	May 12, 1999	Socorro	LINEAR	H	1.8 km	MPC · JPL
80027	1999 JV_{11}	—	May 12, 1999	Socorro	LINEAR	H	1.3 km	MPC · JPL
80028	1999 JX_{12}	—	May 14, 1999	Catalina	CSS	·	5.5 km	MPC · JPL
80029	1999 JF_{15}	—	May 15, 1999	Catalina	CSS	·	5.8 km	MPC · JPL
80030	1999 JJ_{15}	—	May 15, 1999	Catalina	CSS	·	6.8 km	MPC · JPL
80031	1999 JF_{17}	—	May 15, 1999	Kitt Peak	Spacewatch	·	8.0 km	MPC · JPL
80032	1999 JW_{18}	—	May 10, 1999	Socorro	LINEAR	·	5.8 km	MPC · JPL
80033	1999 JY_{20}	—	May 10, 1999	Socorro	LINEAR	·	5.3 km	MPC · JPL
80034	1999 JQ_{21}	—	May 10, 1999	Socorro	LINEAR	·	11 km	MPC · JPL
80035	1999 JV_{21}	—	May 10, 1999	Socorro	LINEAR	LIX	11 km	MPC · JPL
80036	1999 JZ_{26}	—	May 10, 1999	Socorro	LINEAR	·	5.2 km	MPC · JPL
80037	1999 JP_{27}	—	May 10, 1999	Socorro	LINEAR	·	5.7 km	MPC · JPL
80038	1999 JD_{29}	—	May 10, 1999	Socorro	LINEAR	EOS	7.1 km	MPC · JPL
80039	1999 JX_{30}	—	May 10, 1999	Socorro	LINEAR	HYG	6.8 km	MPC · JPL
80040	1999 JT_{31}	—	May 10, 1999	Socorro	LINEAR	·	5.1 km	MPC · JPL
80041	1999 JK_{38}	—	May 10, 1999	Socorro	LINEAR	slow	12 km	MPC · JPL
80042	1999 JP_{38}	—	May 10, 1999	Socorro	LINEAR	EOS	4.5 km	MPC · JPL
80043	1999 JS_{39}	—	May 10, 1999	Socorro	LINEAR	EOS	5.0 km	MPC · JPL
80044	1999 JN_{40}	—	May 10, 1999	Socorro	LINEAR	·	8.6 km	MPC · JPL
80045	1999 JW_{41}	—	May 10, 1999	Socorro	LINEAR	VER	6.1 km	MPC · JPL
80046	1999 JH_{46}	—	May 10, 1999	Socorro	LINEAR	·	7.5 km	MPC · JPL
80047	1999 JN_{50}	—	May 10, 1999	Socorro	LINEAR	·	9.0 km	MPC · JPL
80048	1999 JG_{54}	—	May 10, 1999	Socorro	LINEAR	·	3.6 km	MPC · JPL
80049	1999 JV_{54}	—	May 10, 1999	Socorro	LINEAR	·	6.7 km	MPC · JPL
80050	1999 JD_{55}	—	May 10, 1999	Socorro	LINEAR	·	6.5 km	MPC · JPL
80051	1999 JO_{56}	—	May 10, 1999	Socorro	LINEAR	·	11 km	MPC · JPL
80052	1999 JV_{62}	—	May 10, 1999	Socorro	LINEAR	TIR	4.1 km	MPC · JPL
80053	1999 JY_{64}	—	May 10, 1999	Socorro	LINEAR	·	8.1 km	MPC · JPL
80054	1999 JC_{69}	—	May 12, 1999	Socorro	LINEAR	·	5.5 km	MPC · JPL
80055	1999 JL_{70}	—	May 12, 1999	Socorro	LINEAR	·	6.8 km	MPC · JPL
80056	1999 JM_{71}	—	May 12, 1999	Socorro	LINEAR	·	3.8 km	MPC · JPL
80057	1999 JV_{71}	—	May 12, 1999	Socorro	LINEAR	EOS	5.7 km	MPC · JPL
80058	1999 JV_{74}	—	May 12, 1999	Socorro	LINEAR	slow	9.4 km	MPC · JPL
80059	1999 JM_{75}	—	May 8, 1999	Xinglong	SCAP	TIR	4.0 km	MPC · JPL
80060	1999 JG_{82}	—	May 12, 1999	Socorro	LINEAR	EMA	8.6 km	MPC · JPL
80061	1999 JT_{83}	—	May 12, 1999	Socorro	LINEAR	·	4.8 km	MPC · JPL
80062	1999 JX_{85}	—	May 12, 1999	Socorro	LINEAR	LIX	9.5 km	MPC · JPL
80063	1999 JR_{88}	—	May 12, 1999	Socorro	LINEAR	·	4.5 km	MPC · JPL
80064	1999 JX_{88}	—	May 12, 1999	Socorro	LINEAR	·	3.8 km	MPC · JPL
80065	1999 JA_{91}	—	May 12, 1999	Socorro	LINEAR	·	4.8 km	MPC · JPL
80066	1999 JD_{92}	—	May 12, 1999	Socorro	LINEAR	·	5.8 km	MPC · JPL
80067	1999 JQ_{93}	—	May 12, 1999	Socorro	LINEAR	·	5.7 km	MPC · JPL
80068	1999 JM_{94}	—	May 12, 1999	Socorro	LINEAR	TIR	4.1 km	MPC · JPL
80069	1999 JV_{96}	—	May 12, 1999	Socorro	LINEAR	·	4.4 km	MPC · JPL
80070	1999 JW_{96}	—	May 12, 1999	Socorro	LINEAR	EMA	7.8 km	MPC · JPL
80071	1999 JR_{97}	—	May 12, 1999	Socorro	LINEAR	·	8.6 km	MPC · JPL
80072	1999 JT_{98}	—	May 12, 1999	Socorro	LINEAR	·	6.4 km	MPC · JPL
80073	1999 JA_{99}	—	May 12, 1999	Socorro	LINEAR	slow	7.4 km	MPC · JPL
80074	1999 JS_{99}	—	May 12, 1999	Socorro	LINEAR	·	4.6 km	MPC · JPL
80075	1999 JN_{100}	—	May 12, 1999	Socorro	LINEAR	·	7.5 km	MPC · JPL
80076	1999 JO_{101}	—	May 13, 1999	Socorro	LINEAR	·	15 km	MPC · JPL
80077	1999 JL_{115}	—	May 13, 1999	Socorro	LINEAR	·	4.8 km	MPC · JPL
80078	1999 JU_{115}	—	May 13, 1999	Socorro	LINEAR	·	6.1 km	MPC · JPL
80079	1999 JS_{119}	—	May 13, 1999	Socorro	LINEAR	·	8.2 km	MPC · JPL
80080	1999 JS_{124}	—	May 10, 1999	Socorro	LINEAR	HYG	6.9 km	MPC · JPL
80081	1999 JJ_{131}	—	May 13, 1999	Socorro	LINEAR	·	6.5 km	MPC · JPL
80082	1999 JA_{133}	—	May 13, 1999	Socorro	LINEAR	·	4.5 km	MPC · JPL
80083	1999 KD_{2}	—	May 16, 1999	Kitt Peak	Spacewatch	·	4.7 km	MPC · JPL
80084	1999 KN_{6}	—	May 23, 1999	Woomera	F. B. Zoltowski	·	5.0 km	MPC · JPL
80085	1999 KS_{6}	—	May 17, 1999	Socorro	LINEAR	TIR	4.5 km	MPC · JPL
80086	1999 KJ_{7}	—	May 17, 1999	Socorro	LINEAR	·	8.2 km	MPC · JPL
80087	1999 KC_{11}	—	May 18, 1999	Socorro	LINEAR	·	7.6 km	MPC · JPL
80088	1999 KW_{14}	—	May 18, 1999	Socorro	LINEAR	·	9.5 km	MPC · JPL
80089	1999 LR	—	June 4, 1999	Socorro	LINEAR	H	2.8 km	MPC · JPL
80090	1999 LR_{3}	—	June 6, 1999	Kitt Peak	Spacewatch	·	4.3 km	MPC · JPL
80091	1999 LX_{5}	—	June 11, 1999	Socorro	LINEAR	H	1.4 km	MPC · JPL
80092	1999 LX_{10}	—	June 8, 1999	Socorro	LINEAR	VER	6.2 km	MPC · JPL
80093	1999 LB_{12}	—	June 9, 1999	Socorro	LINEAR	H	1.4 km	MPC · JPL
80094	1999 LE_{12}	—	June 9, 1999	Socorro	LINEAR	·	9.6 km	MPC · JPL
80095	1999 LD_{28}	—	June 12, 1999	Socorro	LINEAR	LUT	7.0 km	MPC · JPL
80096	1999 LP_{29}	—	June 9, 1999	Kitt Peak	Spacewatch	H	1.2 km	MPC · JPL
80097	1999 LD_{35}	—	June 14, 1999	Socorro	LINEAR	VER	6.0 km	MPC · JPL
80098	1999 MV_{1}	—	June 20, 1999	Anderson Mesa	LONEOS	·	1.5 km	MPC · JPL
80099	1999 NR	—	July 8, 1999	Catalina	CSS	H	960 m	MPC · JPL
80100	1999 NS	—	July 8, 1999	Catalina	CSS	H	1.7 km	MPC · JPL

== 80101–80200 ==
back to top

Designation			Discovery			Properties		Ref
Permanent	Provisional	Named after	Date	Site	Discoverer(s)	Category	Diam.	Ref
80101	1999 NV_{2}	—	July 13, 1999	Socorro	LINEAR	H	1.4 km	MPC · JPL
80102	1999 NS_{42}	—	July 14, 1999	Socorro	LINEAR	·	4.4 km	MPC · JPL
80103	1999 PA	—	August 2, 1999	Gekko	T. Kagawa	·	2.5 km	MPC · JPL
80104	1999 RA_{22}	—	September 7, 1999	Socorro	LINEAR	·	1.5 km	MPC · JPL
80105	1999 RD_{24}	—	September 7, 1999	Socorro	LINEAR	·	1.5 km	MPC · JPL
80106	1999 RV_{26}	—	September 7, 1999	Socorro	LINEAR	·	1.1 km	MPC · JPL
80107	1999 RG_{29}	—	September 8, 1999	Socorro	LINEAR	·	2.5 km	MPC · JPL
80108	1999 RL_{29}	—	September 8, 1999	Socorro	LINEAR	H	1.3 km	MPC · JPL
80109	1999 RA_{34}	—	September 10, 1999	Socorro	LINEAR	H · slow	1.4 km	MPC · JPL
80110	1999 RQ_{40}	—	September 7, 1999	Socorro	LINEAR	·	1.4 km	MPC · JPL
80111	1999 RK_{42}	—	September 13, 1999	Višnjan Observatory	K. Korlević	PHO	4.2 km	MPC · JPL
80112	1999 RN_{61}	—	September 7, 1999	Socorro	LINEAR	·	1.4 km	MPC · JPL
80113	1999 RL_{78}	—	September 7, 1999	Socorro	LINEAR	MAS	1.5 km	MPC · JPL
80114	1999 RO_{88}	—	September 7, 1999	Socorro	LINEAR	·	1.8 km	MPC · JPL
80115	1999 RF_{95}	—	September 7, 1999	Socorro	LINEAR	·	1.9 km	MPC · JPL
80116	1999 RZ_{109}	—	September 8, 1999	Socorro	LINEAR	·	1.5 km	MPC · JPL
80117	1999 RS_{111}	—	September 9, 1999	Socorro	LINEAR	TIR	4.0 km	MPC · JPL
80118	1999 RO_{134}	—	September 9, 1999	Socorro	LINEAR	·	1.9 km	MPC · JPL
80119	1999 RY_{138}	—	September 9, 1999	Socorro	LINEAR	L5	28 km	MPC · JPL
80120	1999 RU_{139}	—	September 9, 1999	Socorro	LINEAR	·	2.1 km	MPC · JPL
80121	1999 RV_{144}	—	September 9, 1999	Socorro	LINEAR	·	8.4 km	MPC · JPL
80122	1999 RY_{155}	—	September 9, 1999	Socorro	LINEAR	·	1.6 km	MPC · JPL
80123	1999 RB_{170}	—	September 9, 1999	Socorro	LINEAR	·	2.0 km	MPC · JPL
80124	1999 RF_{171}	—	September 9, 1999	Socorro	LINEAR	·	1.4 km	MPC · JPL
80125	1999 RG_{176}	—	September 9, 1999	Socorro	LINEAR	·	2.0 km	MPC · JPL
80126	1999 RF_{190}	—	September 10, 1999	Socorro	LINEAR	·	1.5 km	MPC · JPL
80127	1999 RP_{198}	—	September 9, 1999	Socorro	LINEAR	·	1.7 km	MPC · JPL
80128	1999 RO_{210}	—	September 8, 1999	Socorro	LINEAR	·	1.9 km	MPC · JPL
80129	1999 RD_{225}	—	September 7, 1999	Socorro	LINEAR	·	2.0 km	MPC · JPL
80130	1999 SZ_{1}	—	September 18, 1999	Socorro	LINEAR	H	1.8 km	MPC · JPL
80131	1999 ST_{5}	—	September 30, 1999	Socorro	LINEAR	PHO	3.2 km	MPC · JPL
80132	1999 SV_{10}	—	September 30, 1999	Catalina	CSS	·	1.4 km	MPC · JPL
80133	1999 SB_{11}	—	September 30, 1999	Catalina	CSS	·	3.2 km	MPC · JPL
80134	1999 TE_{8}	—	October 5, 1999	Fountain Hills	C. W. Juels	·	1.6 km	MPC · JPL
80135 Zanzanini	1999 TA_{11}	Zanzanini	October 7, 1999	Gnosca	S. Sposetti	·	2.0 km	MPC · JPL
80136	1999 TV_{22}	—	October 3, 1999	Kitt Peak	Spacewatch	·	1.5 km	MPC · JPL
80137	1999 TT_{25}	—	October 3, 1999	Socorro	LINEAR	·	1.7 km	MPC · JPL
80138	1999 TY_{35}	—	October 10, 1999	Xinglong	SCAP	·	1.4 km	MPC · JPL
80139	1999 TA_{46}	—	October 3, 1999	Kitt Peak	Spacewatch	·	1.3 km	MPC · JPL
80140	1999 TC_{56}	—	October 6, 1999	Kitt Peak	Spacewatch	·	1.0 km	MPC · JPL
80141	1999 TF_{68}	—	October 8, 1999	Kitt Peak	Spacewatch	·	1.1 km	MPC · JPL
80142	1999 TX_{89}	—	October 2, 1999	Socorro	LINEAR	·	1.4 km	MPC · JPL
80143	1999 TD_{92}	—	October 2, 1999	Socorro	LINEAR	·	1.4 km	MPC · JPL
80144	1999 TY_{124}	—	October 4, 1999	Socorro	LINEAR	·	1.4 km	MPC · JPL
80145	1999 TD_{153}	—	October 7, 1999	Socorro	LINEAR	·	1.2 km	MPC · JPL
80146	1999 TJ_{155}	—	October 7, 1999	Socorro	LINEAR	·	1.9 km	MPC · JPL
80147	1999 TV_{171}	—	October 10, 1999	Socorro	LINEAR	NYS	2.1 km	MPC · JPL
80148	1999 TA_{174}	—	October 10, 1999	Socorro	LINEAR	NYS	2.0 km	MPC · JPL
80149	1999 TV_{177}	—	October 10, 1999	Socorro	LINEAR	·	1.5 km	MPC · JPL
80150	1999 TL_{179}	—	October 10, 1999	Socorro	LINEAR	·	1.2 km	MPC · JPL
80151	1999 TO_{180}	—	October 10, 1999	Socorro	LINEAR	·	2.8 km	MPC · JPL
80152	1999 TF_{195}	—	October 12, 1999	Socorro	LINEAR	·	1.6 km	MPC · JPL
80153	1999 TP_{196}	—	October 12, 1999	Socorro	LINEAR	·	1.8 km	MPC · JPL
80154	1999 TL_{200}	—	October 12, 1999	Socorro	LINEAR	·	3.3 km	MPC · JPL
80155	1999 TN_{206}	—	October 13, 1999	Socorro	LINEAR	·	1.9 km	MPC · JPL
80156	1999 TV_{211}	—	October 15, 1999	Socorro	LINEAR	·	1.5 km	MPC · JPL
80157	1999 TC_{213}	—	October 15, 1999	Socorro	LINEAR	·	2.0 km	MPC · JPL
80158	1999 TN_{223}	—	October 2, 1999	Socorro	LINEAR	·	3.7 km	MPC · JPL
80159	1999 TL_{232}	—	October 5, 1999	Catalina	CSS	·	1.5 km	MPC · JPL
80160	1999 TT_{239}	—	October 4, 1999	Catalina	CSS	·	1.7 km	MPC · JPL
80161	1999 TK_{247}	—	October 8, 1999	Catalina	CSS	·	1.3 km	MPC · JPL
80162	1999 TZ_{248}	—	October 8, 1999	Catalina	CSS	·	1.3 km	MPC · JPL
80163	1999 TG_{258}	—	October 9, 1999	Socorro	LINEAR	·	1.5 km	MPC · JPL
80164	1999 TZ_{264}	—	October 3, 1999	Socorro	LINEAR	H	1.1 km	MPC · JPL
80165	1999 TL_{285}	—	October 9, 1999	Socorro	LINEAR	·	1.4 km	MPC · JPL
80166	1999 TP_{291}	—	October 10, 1999	Socorro	LINEAR	·	1.7 km	MPC · JPL
80167	1999 TL_{293}	—	October 12, 1999	Socorro	LINEAR	·	3.6 km	MPC · JPL
80168	1999 TD_{321}	—	October 10, 1999	Socorro	LINEAR	·	1.7 km	MPC · JPL
80169	1999 TD_{328}	—	October 12, 1999	Socorro	LINEAR	·	1.7 km	MPC · JPL
80170	1999 UP_{5}	—	October 29, 1999	Catalina	CSS	·	1.4 km	MPC · JPL
80171	1999 UO_{6}	—	October 28, 1999	Xinglong	SCAP	·	1.9 km	MPC · JPL
80172	1999 UV_{8}	—	October 29, 1999	Catalina	CSS	·	1.2 km	MPC · JPL
80173	1999 UQ_{12}	—	October 29, 1999	Catalina	CSS	fast	2.0 km	MPC · JPL
80174	1999 UN_{23}	—	October 28, 1999	Catalina	CSS	·	3.9 km	MPC · JPL
80175	1999 UP_{26}	—	October 30, 1999	Catalina	CSS	·	2.0 km	MPC · JPL
80176	1999 UL_{38}	—	October 29, 1999	Anderson Mesa	LONEOS	·	1.8 km	MPC · JPL
80177	1999 US_{43}	—	October 28, 1999	Catalina	CSS	·	1.8 km	MPC · JPL
80178	1999 UX_{49}	—	October 30, 1999	Catalina	CSS	NYS	1.8 km	MPC · JPL
80179 Václavknoll	1999 VK	Václavknoll	November 1, 1999	Ondřejov	L. Kotková	·	2.0 km	MPC · JPL
80180 Elko	1999 VS	Elko	November 3, 1999	Wiggins Observatory	P. Wiggins, Phaneuf, H.	·	2.0 km	MPC · JPL
80181	1999 VD_{11}	—	November 7, 1999	Višnjan Observatory	K. Korlević	·	1.7 km	MPC · JPL
80182	1999 VF_{13}	—	November 1, 1999	Socorro	LINEAR	PHO	3.4 km	MPC · JPL
80183	1999 VT_{20}	—	November 9, 1999	Nachi-Katsuura	Y. Shimizu, T. Urata	·	5.3 km	MPC · JPL
80184 Hekigoto	1999 VX_{22}	Hekigoto	November 10, 1999	Kuma Kogen	A. Nakamura	·	1.3 km	MPC · JPL
80185	1999 VO_{29}	—	November 3, 1999	Socorro	LINEAR	·	4.2 km	MPC · JPL
80186	1999 VD_{32}	—	November 3, 1999	Socorro	LINEAR	·	1.5 km	MPC · JPL
80187	1999 VJ_{34}	—	November 3, 1999	Socorro	LINEAR	·	3.3 km	MPC · JPL
80188	1999 VC_{37}	—	November 3, 1999	Socorro	LINEAR	·	1.6 km	MPC · JPL
80189	1999 VE_{37}	—	November 3, 1999	Socorro	LINEAR	·	2.1 km	MPC · JPL
80190	1999 VF_{38}	—	November 10, 1999	Socorro	LINEAR	·	3.4 km	MPC · JPL
80191	1999 VG_{38}	—	November 10, 1999	Socorro	LINEAR	·	1.6 km	MPC · JPL
80192	1999 VS_{38}	—	November 10, 1999	Socorro	LINEAR	·	1.3 km	MPC · JPL
80193	1999 VO_{43}	—	November 1, 1999	Catalina	CSS	·	1.3 km	MPC · JPL
80194	1999 VE_{44}	—	November 3, 1999	Catalina	CSS	·	1.4 km	MPC · JPL
80195	1999 VF_{45}	—	November 4, 1999	Catalina	CSS	·	1.6 km	MPC · JPL
80196	1999 VV_{48}	—	November 3, 1999	Socorro	LINEAR	·	2.2 km	MPC · JPL
80197	1999 VG_{49}	—	November 3, 1999	Socorro	LINEAR	·	1.4 km	MPC · JPL
80198	1999 VC_{50}	—	November 3, 1999	Socorro	LINEAR	·	1.4 km	MPC · JPL
80199	1999 VW_{52}	—	November 3, 1999	Socorro	LINEAR	·	1.9 km	MPC · JPL
80200	1999 VM_{53}	—	November 4, 1999	Socorro	LINEAR	·	1.8 km	MPC · JPL

== 80201–80300 ==
back to top

Designation			Discovery			Properties		Ref
Permanent	Provisional	Named after	Date	Site	Discoverer(s)	Category	Diam.	Ref
80201	1999 VG_{54}	—	November 4, 1999	Socorro	LINEAR	·	1.2 km	MPC · JPL
80202	1999 VU_{57}	—	November 4, 1999	Socorro	LINEAR	·	1.5 km	MPC · JPL
80203	1999 VA_{58}	—	November 4, 1999	Socorro	LINEAR	(1338) (FLO)	1.6 km	MPC · JPL
80204	1999 VF_{58}	—	November 4, 1999	Socorro	LINEAR	·	1.4 km	MPC · JPL
80205	1999 VV_{59}	—	November 4, 1999	Socorro	LINEAR	·	1.4 km	MPC · JPL
80206	1999 VU_{69}	—	November 4, 1999	Socorro	LINEAR	·	1.8 km	MPC · JPL
80207	1999 VH_{73}	—	November 1, 1999	Kitt Peak	Spacewatch	·	2.1 km	MPC · JPL
80208	1999 VG_{81}	—	November 4, 1999	Socorro	LINEAR	·	1.9 km	MPC · JPL
80209	1999 VK_{89}	—	November 4, 1999	Socorro	LINEAR	NYS	1.2 km	MPC · JPL
80210	1999 VN_{90}	—	November 5, 1999	Socorro	LINEAR	·	1.6 km	MPC · JPL
80211	1999 VF_{95}	—	November 9, 1999	Socorro	LINEAR	·	1.5 km	MPC · JPL
80212	1999 VQ_{96}	—	November 9, 1999	Socorro	LINEAR	·	1.3 km	MPC · JPL
80213	1999 VS_{105}	—	November 9, 1999	Socorro	LINEAR	·	1.3 km	MPC · JPL
80214	1999 VG_{107}	—	November 9, 1999	Socorro	LINEAR	·	2.8 km	MPC · JPL
80215	1999 VM_{111}	—	November 9, 1999	Socorro	LINEAR	·	1.6 km	MPC · JPL
80216	1999 VL_{112}	—	November 9, 1999	Socorro	LINEAR	·	1.3 km	MPC · JPL
80217	1999 VX_{114}	—	November 9, 1999	Catalina	CSS	·	1.5 km	MPC · JPL
80218	1999 VO_{123}	—	November 5, 1999	Kitt Peak	Spacewatch	moon	1.3 km	MPC · JPL
80219	1999 VA_{124}	—	November 5, 1999	Kitt Peak	Spacewatch	·	1.6 km	MPC · JPL
80220	1999 VC_{144}	—	November 11, 1999	Catalina	CSS	AGN	2.2 km	MPC · JPL
80221	1999 VM_{144}	—	November 11, 1999	Catalina	CSS	·	1.6 km	MPC · JPL
80222	1999 VP_{144}	—	November 11, 1999	Catalina	CSS	·	1.3 km	MPC · JPL
80223	1999 VH_{151}	—	November 14, 1999	Socorro	LINEAR	·	1.6 km	MPC · JPL
80224	1999 VH_{160}	—	November 14, 1999	Socorro	LINEAR	·	1.4 km	MPC · JPL
80225	1999 VT_{160}	—	November 14, 1999	Socorro	LINEAR	·	1.5 km	MPC · JPL
80226	1999 VP_{166}	—	November 14, 1999	Socorro	LINEAR	·	1.4 km	MPC · JPL
80227	1999 VH_{168}	—	November 14, 1999	Socorro	LINEAR	fast	1.7 km	MPC · JPL
80228	1999 VN_{170}	—	November 14, 1999	Socorro	LINEAR	·	1.6 km	MPC · JPL
80229	1999 VA_{171}	—	November 14, 1999	Socorro	LINEAR	·	3.0 km	MPC · JPL
80230	1999 VH_{171}	—	November 14, 1999	Socorro	LINEAR	V	1.4 km	MPC · JPL
80231	1999 VF_{187}	—	November 15, 1999	Socorro	LINEAR	·	1.2 km	MPC · JPL
80232	1999 VQ_{188}	—	November 15, 1999	Socorro	LINEAR	NYS	1.3 km	MPC · JPL
80233	1999 VB_{190}	—	November 15, 1999	Socorro	LINEAR	·	1.7 km	MPC · JPL
80234	1999 VK_{195}	—	November 3, 1999	Catalina	CSS	V	1.1 km	MPC · JPL
80235	1999 VO_{201}	—	November 3, 1999	Socorro	LINEAR	·	1.5 km	MPC · JPL
80236	1999 VX_{201}	—	November 3, 1999	Socorro	LINEAR	·	2.2 km	MPC · JPL
80237	1999 VR_{208}	—	November 10, 1999	Kitt Peak	Spacewatch	·	1.4 km	MPC · JPL
80238	1999 VH_{218}	—	November 5, 1999	Socorro	LINEAR	PHO	6.0 km	MPC · JPL
80239	1999 VM_{220}	—	November 3, 1999	Socorro	LINEAR	·	2.5 km	MPC · JPL
80240	1999 VZ_{223}	—	November 5, 1999	Socorro	LINEAR	·	2.2 km	MPC · JPL
80241	1999 VH_{225}	—	November 5, 1999	Socorro	LINEAR	(2076)	1.1 km	MPC · JPL
80242	1999 WT	—	November 18, 1999	Oohira	T. Urata	·	1.5 km	MPC · JPL
80243	1999 WL_{1}	—	November 28, 1999	Kleť	Kleť	·	1.8 km	MPC · JPL
80244	1999 WY_{1}	—	November 25, 1999	Višnjan Observatory	K. Korlević	·	1.6 km	MPC · JPL
80245	1999 WM_{4}	—	November 28, 1999	Oizumi	T. Kobayashi	·	2.1 km	MPC · JPL
80246	1999 WW_{6}	—	November 28, 1999	Višnjan Observatory	K. Korlević	·	1.6 km	MPC · JPL
80247	1999 WD_{7}	—	November 28, 1999	Višnjan Observatory	K. Korlević	·	1.8 km	MPC · JPL
80248	1999 WL_{7}	—	November 28, 1999	Višnjan Observatory	K. Korlević	·	1.7 km	MPC · JPL
80249	1999 WB_{9}	—	November 30, 1999	Zeno	T. Stafford	·	2.4 km	MPC · JPL
80250	1999 WW_{9}	—	November 30, 1999	Oizumi	T. Kobayashi	·	2.1 km	MPC · JPL
80251	1999 WW_{11}	—	November 28, 1999	Kitt Peak	Spacewatch	L4	10 km	MPC · JPL
80252	1999 WD_{12}	—	November 28, 1999	Kitt Peak	Spacewatch	·	1.2 km	MPC · JPL
80253	1999 WF_{13}	—	November 30, 1999	Kitt Peak	Spacewatch	·	2.8 km	MPC · JPL
80254	1999 WG_{13}	—	November 30, 1999	Kitt Peak	Spacewatch	·	1.1 km	MPC · JPL
80255	1999 WZ_{19}	—	November 16, 1999	Catalina	CSS	·	1.6 km	MPC · JPL
80256	1999 XD_{1}	—	December 2, 1999	Oizumi	T. Kobayashi	·	1.9 km	MPC · JPL
80257	1999 XF_{3}	—	December 4, 1999	Catalina	CSS	·	2.4 km	MPC · JPL
80258	1999 XE_{5}	—	December 4, 1999	Catalina	CSS	·	1.5 km	MPC · JPL
80259	1999 XW_{5}	—	December 4, 1999	Catalina	CSS	·	1.3 km	MPC · JPL
80260	1999 XR_{6}	—	December 4, 1999	Catalina	CSS	·	1.6 km	MPC · JPL
80261	1999 XV_{9}	—	December 4, 1999	Kitt Peak	Spacewatch	·	1.7 km	MPC · JPL
80262	1999 XY_{13}	—	December 5, 1999	Socorro	LINEAR	·	3.6 km	MPC · JPL
80263	1999 XQ_{15}	—	December 5, 1999	Višnjan Observatory	K. Korlević	V	1.8 km	MPC · JPL
80264	1999 XR_{15}	—	December 5, 1999	Višnjan Observatory	K. Korlević	·	1.6 km	MPC · JPL
80265	1999 XV_{21}	—	December 5, 1999	Socorro	LINEAR	·	3.5 km	MPC · JPL
80266	1999 XE_{22}	—	December 5, 1999	Socorro	LINEAR	·	3.1 km	MPC · JPL
80267	1999 XX_{25}	—	December 6, 1999	Socorro	LINEAR	·	1.6 km	MPC · JPL
80268	1999 XU_{27}	—	December 6, 1999	Socorro	LINEAR	·	1.6 km	MPC · JPL
80269	1999 XW_{28}	—	December 6, 1999	Socorro	LINEAR	·	1.6 km	MPC · JPL
80270	1999 XJ_{29}	—	December 6, 1999	Socorro	LINEAR	·	1.6 km	MPC · JPL
80271	1999 XY_{29}	—	December 6, 1999	Socorro	LINEAR	·	3.2 km	MPC · JPL
80272	1999 XJ_{30}	—	December 6, 1999	Socorro	LINEAR	·	1.7 km	MPC · JPL
80273	1999 XQ_{30}	—	December 6, 1999	Socorro	LINEAR	·	1.7 km	MPC · JPL
80274	1999 XW_{30}	—	December 6, 1999	Socorro	LINEAR	·	1.4 km	MPC · JPL
80275	1999 XY_{31}	—	December 6, 1999	Socorro	LINEAR	NYS	2.2 km	MPC · JPL
80276	1999 XL_{32}	—	December 6, 1999	Socorro	LINEAR	·	3.7 km	MPC · JPL
80277	1999 XQ_{32}	—	December 6, 1999	Socorro	LINEAR	(5)	2.8 km	MPC · JPL
80278	1999 XH_{33}	—	December 6, 1999	Socorro	LINEAR	·	2.2 km	MPC · JPL
80279	1999 XP_{33}	—	December 6, 1999	Socorro	LINEAR	·	3.2 km	MPC · JPL
80280	1999 XX_{33}	—	December 6, 1999	Socorro	LINEAR	·	2.8 km	MPC · JPL
80281	1999 XS_{34}	—	December 6, 1999	Socorro	LINEAR	·	3.2 km	MPC · JPL
80282	1999 XF_{35}	—	December 7, 1999	Socorro	LINEAR	·	1.6 km	MPC · JPL
80283	1999 XF_{36}	—	December 6, 1999	Oizumi	T. Kobayashi	·	2.5 km	MPC · JPL
80284	1999 XH_{39}	—	December 6, 1999	Socorro	LINEAR	·	2.2 km	MPC · JPL
80285	1999 XH_{40}	—	December 7, 1999	Socorro	LINEAR	·	1.7 km	MPC · JPL
80286	1999 XZ_{43}	—	December 7, 1999	Socorro	LINEAR	·	1.5 km	MPC · JPL
80287	1999 XZ_{44}	—	December 7, 1999	Socorro	LINEAR	·	1.6 km	MPC · JPL
80288	1999 XU_{48}	—	December 7, 1999	Socorro	LINEAR	V	1.2 km	MPC · JPL
80289	1999 XP_{49}	—	December 7, 1999	Socorro	LINEAR	·	1.5 km	MPC · JPL
80290	1999 XK_{53}	—	December 7, 1999	Socorro	LINEAR	·	1.4 km	MPC · JPL
80291	1999 XB_{55}	—	December 7, 1999	Socorro	LINEAR	·	1.2 km	MPC · JPL
80292	1999 XX_{55}	—	December 7, 1999	Socorro	LINEAR	·	1.4 km	MPC · JPL
80293	1999 XS_{56}	—	December 7, 1999	Socorro	LINEAR	·	1.8 km	MPC · JPL
80294	1999 XU_{57}	—	December 7, 1999	Socorro	LINEAR	·	1.4 km	MPC · JPL
80295	1999 XY_{57}	—	December 7, 1999	Socorro	LINEAR	·	1.9 km	MPC · JPL
80296	1999 XM_{58}	—	December 7, 1999	Socorro	LINEAR	·	1.1 km	MPC · JPL
80297	1999 XS_{59}	—	December 7, 1999	Socorro	LINEAR	NYS	1.6 km	MPC · JPL
80298	1999 XE_{60}	—	December 7, 1999	Socorro	LINEAR	·	1.6 km	MPC · JPL
80299	1999 XJ_{60}	—	December 7, 1999	Socorro	LINEAR	·	2.2 km	MPC · JPL
80300	1999 XV_{63}	—	December 7, 1999	Socorro	LINEAR	·	1.2 km	MPC · JPL

== 80301–80400 ==
back to top

Designation			Discovery			Properties		Ref
Permanent	Provisional	Named after	Date	Site	Discoverer(s)	Category	Diam.	Ref
80301	1999 XZ_{63}	—	December 7, 1999	Socorro	LINEAR	·	2.3 km	MPC · JPL
80302	1999 XC_{64}	—	December 7, 1999	Socorro	LINEAR	L4	20 km	MPC · JPL
80303	1999 XG_{65}	—	December 7, 1999	Socorro	LINEAR	·	1.3 km	MPC · JPL
80304	1999 XT_{70}	—	December 7, 1999	Socorro	LINEAR	·	2.5 km	MPC · JPL
80305	1999 XX_{70}	—	December 7, 1999	Socorro	LINEAR	NYS	2.2 km	MPC · JPL
80306	1999 XJ_{71}	—	December 7, 1999	Socorro	LINEAR	·	1.1 km	MPC · JPL
80307	1999 XU_{71}	—	December 7, 1999	Socorro	LINEAR	·	2.5 km	MPC · JPL
80308	1999 XX_{71}	—	December 7, 1999	Socorro	LINEAR	NYS	2.0 km	MPC · JPL
80309	1999 XA_{74}	—	December 7, 1999	Socorro	LINEAR	MAS	1.5 km	MPC · JPL
80310	1999 XH_{74}	—	December 7, 1999	Socorro	LINEAR	·	1.7 km	MPC · JPL
80311	1999 XO_{75}	—	December 7, 1999	Socorro	LINEAR	·	2.3 km	MPC · JPL
80312	1999 XO_{76}	—	December 7, 1999	Socorro	LINEAR	·	2.2 km	MPC · JPL
80313	1999 XW_{76}	—	December 7, 1999	Socorro	LINEAR	·	2.7 km	MPC · JPL
80314	1999 XE_{77}	—	December 7, 1999	Socorro	LINEAR	MAS	1.1 km	MPC · JPL
80315	1999 XF_{77}	—	December 7, 1999	Socorro	LINEAR	·	1.5 km	MPC · JPL
80316	1999 XC_{80}	—	December 7, 1999	Socorro	LINEAR	·	1.8 km	MPC · JPL
80317	1999 XG_{80}	—	December 7, 1999	Socorro	LINEAR	·	1.7 km	MPC · JPL
80318	1999 XH_{80}	—	December 7, 1999	Socorro	LINEAR	MAS	1.4 km	MPC · JPL
80319	1999 XE_{81}	—	December 7, 1999	Socorro	LINEAR	·	1.9 km	MPC · JPL
80320	1999 XR_{83}	—	December 7, 1999	Socorro	LINEAR	·	2.8 km	MPC · JPL
80321	1999 XJ_{85}	—	December 7, 1999	Socorro	LINEAR	·	2.7 km	MPC · JPL
80322	1999 XJ_{87}	—	December 7, 1999	Socorro	LINEAR	NYS	3.2 km	MPC · JPL
80323	1999 XV_{88}	—	December 7, 1999	Socorro	LINEAR	·	1.9 km	MPC · JPL
80324	1999 XC_{89}	—	December 7, 1999	Socorro	LINEAR	·	2.1 km	MPC · JPL
80325	1999 XT_{89}	—	December 7, 1999	Socorro	LINEAR	·	1.8 km	MPC · JPL
80326	1999 XW_{89}	—	December 7, 1999	Socorro	LINEAR	·	2.8 km	MPC · JPL
80327	1999 XY_{89}	—	December 7, 1999	Socorro	LINEAR	·	1.4 km	MPC · JPL
80328	1999 XK_{90}	—	December 7, 1999	Socorro	LINEAR	·	2.8 km	MPC · JPL
80329	1999 XH_{91}	—	December 7, 1999	Socorro	LINEAR	·	2.0 km	MPC · JPL
80330	1999 XD_{92}	—	December 7, 1999	Socorro	LINEAR	·	1.6 km	MPC · JPL
80331	1999 XM_{92}	—	December 7, 1999	Socorro	LINEAR	·	1.6 km	MPC · JPL
80332	1999 XL_{93}	—	December 7, 1999	Socorro	LINEAR	·	2.3 km	MPC · JPL
80333	1999 XL_{94}	—	December 7, 1999	Socorro	LINEAR	·	3.0 km	MPC · JPL
80334	1999 XR_{94}	—	December 7, 1999	Socorro	LINEAR	·	3.1 km	MPC · JPL
80335	1999 XG_{95}	—	December 7, 1999	Oizumi	T. Kobayashi	·	2.1 km	MPC · JPL
80336	1999 XY_{97}	—	December 7, 1999	Socorro	LINEAR	NYS	2.6 km	MPC · JPL
80337	1999 XE_{101}	—	December 7, 1999	Socorro	LINEAR	(2076)	3.4 km	MPC · JPL
80338	1999 XX_{102}	—	December 7, 1999	Socorro	LINEAR	V	1.2 km	MPC · JPL
80339	1999 XB_{104}	—	December 7, 1999	Nachi-Katsuura	Y. Shimizu, T. Urata	·	2.6 km	MPC · JPL
80340	1999 XR_{108}	—	December 4, 1999	Catalina	CSS	·	1.6 km	MPC · JPL
80341	1999 XQ_{109}	—	December 4, 1999	Catalina	CSS	·	2.2 km	MPC · JPL
80342	1999 XL_{110}	—	December 4, 1999	Catalina	CSS	·	1.6 km	MPC · JPL
80343	1999 XJ_{111}	—	December 7, 1999	Catalina	CSS	PHO	2.8 km	MPC · JPL
80344	1999 XM_{112}	—	December 10, 1999	Socorro	LINEAR	·	2.8 km	MPC · JPL
80345	1999 XQ_{114}	—	December 11, 1999	Socorro	LINEAR	·	1.8 km	MPC · JPL
80346	1999 XT_{114}	—	December 11, 1999	Socorro	LINEAR	·	2.1 km	MPC · JPL
80347	1999 XJ_{115}	—	December 4, 1999	Catalina	CSS	(2076)	2.2 km	MPC · JPL
80348	1999 XO_{115}	—	December 4, 1999	Catalina	CSS	·	1.3 km	MPC · JPL
80349	1999 XW_{116}	—	December 5, 1999	Catalina	CSS	·	1.7 km	MPC · JPL
80350	1999 XE_{117}	—	December 5, 1999	Catalina	CSS	·	1.8 km	MPC · JPL
80351	1999 XM_{119}	—	December 5, 1999	Catalina	CSS	·	1.9 km	MPC · JPL
80352	1999 XX_{119}	—	December 5, 1999	Catalina	CSS	·	1.6 km	MPC · JPL
80353	1999 XM_{120}	—	December 5, 1999	Catalina	CSS	·	2.9 km	MPC · JPL
80354	1999 XJ_{121}	—	December 5, 1999	Catalina	CSS	NYS	2.0 km	MPC · JPL
80355	1999 XL_{123}	—	December 7, 1999	Catalina	CSS	·	1.7 km	MPC · JPL
80356	1999 XM_{124}	—	December 7, 1999	Catalina	CSS	·	1.8 km	MPC · JPL
80357	1999 XF_{125}	—	December 7, 1999	Catalina	CSS	·	2.8 km	MPC · JPL
80358	1999 XA_{126}	—	December 7, 1999	Catalina	CSS	·	1.2 km	MPC · JPL
80359	1999 XO_{126}	—	December 7, 1999	Catalina	CSS	·	1.9 km	MPC · JPL
80360	1999 XM_{130}	—	December 12, 1999	Socorro	LINEAR	·	4.0 km	MPC · JPL
80361	1999 XZ_{130}	—	December 12, 1999	Socorro	LINEAR	·	1.3 km	MPC · JPL
80362	1999 XD_{134}	—	December 12, 1999	Socorro	LINEAR	·	2.4 km	MPC · JPL
80363	1999 XE_{134}	—	December 12, 1999	Socorro	LINEAR	·	2.4 km	MPC · JPL
80364	1999 XS_{135}	—	December 8, 1999	Socorro	LINEAR	·	2.3 km	MPC · JPL
80365	1999 XF_{139}	—	December 6, 1999	Kitt Peak	Spacewatch	·	1.9 km	MPC · JPL
80366	1999 XA_{142}	—	December 12, 1999	Socorro	LINEAR	PHO · slow	2.9 km	MPC · JPL
80367	1999 XX_{145}	—	December 7, 1999	Kitt Peak	Spacewatch	·	1.1 km	MPC · JPL
80368	1999 XV_{151}	—	December 7, 1999	Kitt Peak	Spacewatch	·	2.5 km	MPC · JPL
80369	1999 XW_{151}	—	December 7, 1999	Kitt Peak	Spacewatch	·	1.9 km	MPC · JPL
80370	1999 XG_{154}	—	December 8, 1999	Socorro	LINEAR	V	1.4 km	MPC · JPL
80371	1999 XM_{154}	—	December 8, 1999	Socorro	LINEAR	·	2.6 km	MPC · JPL
80372	1999 XT_{154}	—	December 8, 1999	Socorro	LINEAR	V	1.3 km	MPC · JPL
80373	1999 XF_{155}	—	December 8, 1999	Socorro	LINEAR	NYS	1.9 km	MPC · JPL
80374	1999 XN_{155}	—	December 8, 1999	Socorro	LINEAR	·	1.5 km	MPC · JPL
80375	1999 XN_{157}	—	December 8, 1999	Socorro	LINEAR	·	2.7 km	MPC · JPL
80376	1999 XQ_{157}	—	December 8, 1999	Socorro	LINEAR	V	1.2 km	MPC · JPL
80377	1999 XM_{158}	—	December 8, 1999	Socorro	LINEAR	·	2.1 km	MPC · JPL
80378	1999 XE_{159}	—	December 8, 1999	Socorro	LINEAR	NYS	1.7 km	MPC · JPL
80379	1999 XV_{159}	—	December 8, 1999	Socorro	LINEAR	·	3.6 km	MPC · JPL
80380	1999 XZ_{159}	—	December 8, 1999	Socorro	LINEAR	·	2.2 km	MPC · JPL
80381	1999 XD_{160}	—	December 8, 1999	Socorro	LINEAR	·	1.8 km	MPC · JPL
80382	1999 XG_{160}	—	December 8, 1999	Socorro	LINEAR	·	1.6 km	MPC · JPL
80383	1999 XP_{160}	—	December 8, 1999	Socorro	LINEAR	(5)	2.5 km	MPC · JPL
80384	1999 XG_{163}	—	December 8, 1999	Kitt Peak	Spacewatch	·	1.8 km	MPC · JPL
80385	1999 XC_{164}	—	December 8, 1999	Socorro	LINEAR	·	1.3 km	MPC · JPL
80386	1999 XR_{164}	—	December 8, 1999	Socorro	LINEAR	·	2.3 km	MPC · JPL
80387	1999 XG_{168}	—	December 10, 1999	Socorro	LINEAR	·	2.5 km	MPC · JPL
80388	1999 XO_{168}	—	December 10, 1999	Socorro	LINEAR	·	3.3 km	MPC · JPL
80389	1999 XC_{170}	—	December 10, 1999	Socorro	LINEAR	·	2.3 km	MPC · JPL
80390	1999 XJ_{171}	—	December 10, 1999	Socorro	LINEAR	·	1.9 km	MPC · JPL
80391	1999 XL_{171}	—	December 10, 1999	Socorro	LINEAR	NYS	2.3 km	MPC · JPL
80392	1999 XC_{172}	—	December 10, 1999	Socorro	LINEAR	·	1.6 km	MPC · JPL
80393	1999 XB_{173}	—	December 10, 1999	Socorro	LINEAR	·	2.7 km	MPC · JPL
80394	1999 XF_{173}	—	December 10, 1999	Socorro	LINEAR	·	2.1 km	MPC · JPL
80395	1999 XO_{173}	—	December 10, 1999	Socorro	LINEAR	·	2.9 km	MPC · JPL
80396	1999 XW_{173}	—	December 10, 1999	Socorro	LINEAR	·	2.4 km	MPC · JPL
80397	1999 XV_{174}	—	December 10, 1999	Socorro	LINEAR	(2076)	1.9 km	MPC · JPL
80398	1999 XS_{175}	—	December 10, 1999	Socorro	LINEAR	·	2.9 km	MPC · JPL
80399	1999 XC_{176}	—	December 10, 1999	Socorro	LINEAR	·	2.9 km	MPC · JPL
80400	1999 XU_{178}	—	December 10, 1999	Socorro	LINEAR	·	2.2 km	MPC · JPL

== 80401–80500 ==
back to top

Designation			Discovery			Properties		Ref
Permanent	Provisional	Named after	Date	Site	Discoverer(s)	Category	Diam.	Ref
80401	1999 XO_{179}	—	December 10, 1999	Socorro	LINEAR	·	3.1 km	MPC · JPL
80402	1999 XR_{179}	—	December 10, 1999	Socorro	LINEAR	NYS	2.2 km	MPC · JPL
80403	1999 XH_{182}	—	December 12, 1999	Socorro	LINEAR	·	2.2 km	MPC · JPL
80404	1999 XD_{184}	—	December 12, 1999	Socorro	LINEAR	·	4.0 km	MPC · JPL
80405	1999 XF_{186}	—	December 12, 1999	Socorro	LINEAR	·	2.3 km	MPC · JPL
80406	1999 XC_{187}	—	December 12, 1999	Socorro	LINEAR	·	2.7 km	MPC · JPL
80407	1999 XQ_{189}	—	December 12, 1999	Socorro	LINEAR	·	1.9 km	MPC · JPL
80408	1999 XO_{193}	—	December 12, 1999	Socorro	LINEAR	·	2.0 km	MPC · JPL
80409	1999 XC_{195}	—	December 12, 1999	Socorro	LINEAR	·	1.6 km	MPC · JPL
80410	1999 XA_{197}	—	December 12, 1999	Socorro	LINEAR	·	1.8 km	MPC · JPL
80411	1999 XM_{198}	—	December 12, 1999	Socorro	LINEAR	·	1.6 km	MPC · JPL
80412	1999 XV_{198}	—	December 12, 1999	Socorro	LINEAR	ERI	2.7 km	MPC · JPL
80413	1999 XE_{200}	—	December 12, 1999	Socorro	LINEAR	·	1.8 km	MPC · JPL
80414	1999 XG_{201}	—	December 12, 1999	Socorro	LINEAR	·	2.4 km	MPC · JPL
80415	1999 XB_{202}	—	December 12, 1999	Socorro	LINEAR	·	2.3 km	MPC · JPL
80416	1999 XN_{202}	—	December 12, 1999	Socorro	LINEAR	V	1.4 km	MPC · JPL
80417	1999 XK_{203}	—	December 12, 1999	Socorro	LINEAR	V	1.9 km	MPC · JPL
80418	1999 XA_{206}	—	December 12, 1999	Socorro	LINEAR	·	2.6 km	MPC · JPL
80419	1999 XR_{207}	—	December 12, 1999	Socorro	LINEAR	V	1.5 km	MPC · JPL
80420	1999 XB_{210}	—	December 13, 1999	Socorro	LINEAR	·	2.7 km	MPC · JPL
80421	1999 XP_{213}	—	December 14, 1999	Socorro	LINEAR	·	1.6 km	MPC · JPL
80422	1999 XT_{214}	—	December 14, 1999	Socorro	LINEAR	·	1.9 km	MPC · JPL
80423	1999 XJ_{215}	—	December 14, 1999	Socorro	LINEAR	BAP	2.8 km	MPC · JPL
80424	1999 XE_{217}	—	December 13, 1999	Kitt Peak	Spacewatch	·	2.0 km	MPC · JPL
80425	1999 XV_{218}	—	December 15, 1999	Kitt Peak	Spacewatch	·	2.1 km	MPC · JPL
80426	1999 XP_{222}	—	December 15, 1999	Socorro	LINEAR	·	2.2 km	MPC · JPL
80427	1999 XZ_{222}	—	December 15, 1999	Socorro	LINEAR	·	3.4 km	MPC · JPL
80428	1999 XM_{224}	—	December 13, 1999	Kitt Peak	Spacewatch	·	2.6 km	MPC · JPL
80429	1999 XV_{225}	—	December 13, 1999	Kitt Peak	Spacewatch	·	2.4 km	MPC · JPL
80430	1999 XC_{227}	—	December 15, 1999	Kitt Peak	Spacewatch	MAS	1.0 km	MPC · JPL
80431	1999 XS_{227}	—	December 15, 1999	Kitt Peak	Spacewatch	NYS	1.9 km	MPC · JPL
80432	1999 XU_{229}	—	December 7, 1999	Catalina	CSS	·	1.9 km	MPC · JPL
80433	1999 XW_{233}	—	December 4, 1999	Anderson Mesa	LONEOS	slow	2.4 km	MPC · JPL
80434	1999 XO_{234}	—	December 3, 1999	Anderson Mesa	LONEOS	·	2.0 km	MPC · JPL
80435	1999 XQ_{238}	—	December 4, 1999	Catalina	CSS	·	3.0 km	MPC · JPL
80436	1999 XE_{246}	—	December 5, 1999	Socorro	LINEAR	V	1.2 km	MPC · JPL
80437	1999 XW_{248}	—	December 6, 1999	Socorro	LINEAR	·	1.2 km	MPC · JPL
80438	1999 XX_{249}	—	December 6, 1999	Socorro	LINEAR	V	1.3 km	MPC · JPL
80439	1999 XH_{259}	—	December 8, 1999	Socorro	LINEAR	·	1.8 km	MPC · JPL
80440	1999 XY_{263}	—	December 12, 1999	Socorro	LINEAR	·	1.8 km	MPC · JPL
80441	1999 YL_{3}	—	December 18, 1999	Socorro	LINEAR	·	2.9 km	MPC · JPL
80442	1999 YM_{4}	—	December 28, 1999	Olathe	Olathe	·	1.6 km	MPC · JPL
80443	1999 YO_{8}	—	December 27, 1999	Kitt Peak	Spacewatch	·	2.0 km	MPC · JPL
80444	1999 YG_{9}	—	December 31, 1999	Višnjan Observatory	K. Korlević	·	3.8 km	MPC · JPL
80445	1999 YO_{10}	—	December 27, 1999	Kitt Peak	Spacewatch	·	1.5 km	MPC · JPL
80446	1999 YW_{13}	—	December 31, 1999	Višnjan Observatory	K. Korlević	·	2.6 km	MPC · JPL
80447	1999 YQ_{14}	—	December 31, 1999	Prescott	P. G. Comba	NYS	2.1 km	MPC · JPL
80448	1999 YA_{17}	—	December 31, 1999	Kitt Peak	Spacewatch	·	4.1 km	MPC · JPL
80449	1999 YG_{17}	—	December 31, 1999	Kitt Peak	Spacewatch	NYS	2.3 km	MPC · JPL
80450	1999 YW_{27}	—	December 30, 1999	Socorro	LINEAR	·	5.1 km	MPC · JPL
80451 Alwoods	2000 AA	Alwoods	January 1, 2000	Oaxaca	Roe, J. M.	·	1.7 km	MPC · JPL
80452	2000 AK	—	January 2, 2000	Fountain Hills	C. W. Juels	·	2.6 km	MPC · JPL
80453	2000 AO_{2}	—	January 3, 2000	Oizumi	T. Kobayashi	·	2.6 km	MPC · JPL
80454	2000 AW_{3}	—	January 3, 2000	Socorro	LINEAR	·	2.0 km	MPC · JPL
80455	2000 AZ_{3}	—	January 3, 2000	Socorro	LINEAR	·	2.7 km	MPC · JPL
80456	2000 AA_{8}	—	January 2, 2000	Socorro	LINEAR	·	2.7 km	MPC · JPL
80457	2000 AH_{9}	—	January 2, 2000	Socorro	LINEAR	·	2.8 km	MPC · JPL
80458	2000 AJ_{9}	—	January 2, 2000	Socorro	LINEAR	·	2.5 km	MPC · JPL
80459	2000 AV_{10}	—	January 3, 2000	Socorro	LINEAR	·	2.5 km	MPC · JPL
80460	2000 AJ_{12}	—	January 3, 2000	Socorro	LINEAR	NYS	2.0 km	MPC · JPL
80461	2000 AP_{14}	—	January 3, 2000	Socorro	LINEAR	·	2.0 km	MPC · JPL
80462	2000 AH_{18}	—	January 3, 2000	Socorro	LINEAR	·	2.0 km	MPC · JPL
80463	2000 AK_{19}	—	January 3, 2000	Socorro	LINEAR	·	1.9 km	MPC · JPL
80464	2000 AU_{19}	—	January 3, 2000	Socorro	LINEAR	·	2.3 km	MPC · JPL
80465	2000 AQ_{20}	—	January 3, 2000	Socorro	LINEAR	·	1.6 km	MPC · JPL
80466	2000 AJ_{22}	—	January 3, 2000	Socorro	LINEAR	·	2.8 km	MPC · JPL
80467	2000 AT_{23}	—	January 3, 2000	Socorro	LINEAR	NYS	2.3 km	MPC · JPL
80468	2000 AE_{26}	—	January 3, 2000	Socorro	LINEAR	·	2.1 km	MPC · JPL
80469	2000 AH_{28}	—	January 3, 2000	Socorro	LINEAR	·	1.9 km	MPC · JPL
80470	2000 AJ_{29}	—	January 3, 2000	Socorro	LINEAR	NYS	1.8 km	MPC · JPL
80471	2000 AK_{29}	—	January 3, 2000	Socorro	LINEAR	·	4.3 km	MPC · JPL
80472	2000 AN_{29}	—	January 3, 2000	Socorro	LINEAR	·	2.6 km	MPC · JPL
80473	2000 AQ_{29}	—	January 3, 2000	Socorro	LINEAR	·	1.8 km	MPC · JPL
80474	2000 AV_{29}	—	January 3, 2000	Socorro	LINEAR	·	1.8 km	MPC · JPL
80475	2000 AB_{30}	—	January 3, 2000	Socorro	LINEAR	·	1.9 km	MPC · JPL
80476	2000 AE_{30}	—	January 3, 2000	Socorro	LINEAR	·	1.5 km	MPC · JPL
80477	2000 AL_{30}	—	January 3, 2000	Socorro	LINEAR	·	2.5 km	MPC · JPL
80478	2000 AC_{31}	—	January 3, 2000	Socorro	LINEAR	NYS	2.7 km	MPC · JPL
80479	2000 AH_{31}	—	January 3, 2000	Socorro	LINEAR	(2076)	2.4 km	MPC · JPL
80480	2000 AS_{32}	—	January 3, 2000	Socorro	LINEAR	·	1.7 km	MPC · JPL
80481	2000 AJ_{33}	—	January 3, 2000	Socorro	LINEAR	PHO	2.0 km	MPC · JPL
80482	2000 AV_{33}	—	January 3, 2000	Socorro	LINEAR	NYS	2.7 km	MPC · JPL
80483	2000 AE_{34}	—	January 3, 2000	Socorro	LINEAR	·	2.2 km	MPC · JPL
80484	2000 AN_{36}	—	January 3, 2000	Socorro	LINEAR	·	2.6 km	MPC · JPL
80485	2000 AM_{38}	—	January 3, 2000	Socorro	LINEAR	·	2.4 km	MPC · JPL
80486	2000 AT_{38}	—	January 3, 2000	Socorro	LINEAR	MIS	4.1 km	MPC · JPL
80487	2000 AW_{39}	—	January 3, 2000	Socorro	LINEAR	·	2.1 km	MPC · JPL
80488	2000 AE_{41}	—	January 3, 2000	Socorro	LINEAR	·	2.5 km	MPC · JPL
80489	2000 AR_{44}	—	January 5, 2000	Kitt Peak	Spacewatch	·	1.9 km	MPC · JPL
80490	2000 AW_{44}	—	January 5, 2000	Kitt Peak	Spacewatch	·	1.9 km	MPC · JPL
80491	2000 AJ_{45}	—	January 3, 2000	Socorro	LINEAR	·	2.0 km	MPC · JPL
80492	2000 AT_{46}	—	January 4, 2000	Socorro	LINEAR	NYS	2.2 km	MPC · JPL
80493	2000 AK_{47}	—	January 4, 2000	Socorro	LINEAR	NYS	2.5 km	MPC · JPL
80494	2000 AM_{47}	—	January 4, 2000	Socorro	LINEAR	·	1.7 km	MPC · JPL
80495	2000 AO_{48}	—	January 3, 2000	Socorro	LINEAR	·	1.2 km	MPC · JPL
80496	2000 AX_{48}	—	January 5, 2000	Socorro	LINEAR	·	3.4 km	MPC · JPL
80497	2000 AN_{49}	—	January 5, 2000	Socorro	LINEAR	(10369)	6.4 km	MPC · JPL
80498	2000 AG_{50}	—	January 5, 2000	Višnjan Observatory	K. Korlević	·	2.2 km	MPC · JPL
80499	2000 AR_{50}	—	January 5, 2000	Fountain Hills	C. W. Juels	·	3.3 km	MPC · JPL
80500	2000 AP_{53}	—	January 4, 2000	Socorro	LINEAR	·	3.0 km	MPC · JPL

== 80501–80600 ==
back to top

Designation			Discovery			Properties		Ref
Permanent	Provisional	Named after	Date	Site	Discoverer(s)	Category	Diam.	Ref
80501	2000 AX_{53}	—	January 4, 2000	Socorro	LINEAR	·	3.6 km	MPC · JPL
80502	2000 AD_{54}	—	January 4, 2000	Socorro	LINEAR	·	2.7 km	MPC · JPL
80503	2000 AE_{54}	—	January 4, 2000	Socorro	LINEAR	·	3.0 km	MPC · JPL
80504	2000 AS_{54}	—	January 4, 2000	Socorro	LINEAR	MAS	1.3 km	MPC · JPL
80505	2000 AW_{54}	—	January 4, 2000	Socorro	LINEAR	·	2.3 km	MPC · JPL
80506	2000 AP_{55}	—	January 4, 2000	Socorro	LINEAR	·	2.1 km	MPC · JPL
80507	2000 AU_{55}	—	January 4, 2000	Socorro	LINEAR	·	1.8 km	MPC · JPL
80508	2000 AC_{56}	—	January 4, 2000	Socorro	LINEAR	NYS	3.2 km	MPC · JPL
80509	2000 AE_{56}	—	January 4, 2000	Socorro	LINEAR	·	2.4 km	MPC · JPL
80510	2000 AJ_{57}	—	January 4, 2000	Socorro	LINEAR	·	1.6 km	MPC · JPL
80511	2000 AK_{57}	—	January 4, 2000	Socorro	LINEAR	·	1.6 km	MPC · JPL
80512	2000 AM_{57}	—	January 4, 2000	Socorro	LINEAR	·	3.4 km	MPC · JPL
80513	2000 AS_{57}	—	January 4, 2000	Socorro	LINEAR	V	2.1 km	MPC · JPL
80514	2000 AV_{58}	—	January 4, 2000	Socorro	LINEAR	NYS	4.2 km	MPC · JPL
80515	2000 AA_{59}	—	January 4, 2000	Socorro	LINEAR	·	1.8 km	MPC · JPL
80516	2000 AL_{59}	—	January 4, 2000	Socorro	LINEAR	·	3.2 km	MPC · JPL
80517	2000 AM_{59}	—	January 4, 2000	Socorro	LINEAR	·	4.6 km	MPC · JPL
80518	2000 AS_{59}	—	January 4, 2000	Socorro	LINEAR	·	3.6 km	MPC · JPL
80519	2000 AQ_{60}	—	January 4, 2000	Socorro	LINEAR	NYS ·	4.6 km	MPC · JPL
80520	2000 AV_{60}	—	January 4, 2000	Socorro	LINEAR	·	2.4 km	MPC · JPL
80521	2000 AP_{61}	—	January 4, 2000	Socorro	LINEAR	·	2.1 km	MPC · JPL
80522	2000 AT_{61}	—	January 4, 2000	Socorro	LINEAR	·	1.9 km	MPC · JPL
80523	2000 AN_{62}	—	January 4, 2000	Socorro	LINEAR	NYS	2.1 km	MPC · JPL
80524	2000 AD_{63}	—	January 4, 2000	Socorro	LINEAR	·	2.6 km	MPC · JPL
80525	2000 AP_{63}	—	January 4, 2000	Socorro	LINEAR	V	1.7 km	MPC · JPL
80526	2000 AC_{64}	—	January 4, 2000	Socorro	LINEAR	·	3.2 km	MPC · JPL
80527	2000 AS_{64}	—	January 4, 2000	Socorro	LINEAR	PHO	3.4 km	MPC · JPL
80528	2000 AZ_{64}	—	January 4, 2000	Socorro	LINEAR	NYS	2.1 km	MPC · JPL
80529	2000 AR_{66}	—	January 4, 2000	Socorro	LINEAR	·	3.0 km	MPC · JPL
80530	2000 AX_{70}	—	January 5, 2000	Socorro	LINEAR	·	1.7 km	MPC · JPL
80531	2000 AY_{70}	—	January 5, 2000	Socorro	LINEAR	·	2.8 km	MPC · JPL
80532	2000 AV_{71}	—	January 5, 2000	Socorro	LINEAR	·	1.7 km	MPC · JPL
80533	2000 AW_{72}	—	January 5, 2000	Socorro	LINEAR	V	1.4 km	MPC · JPL
80534	2000 AB_{73}	—	January 5, 2000	Socorro	LINEAR	(2076)	1.7 km	MPC · JPL
80535	2000 AH_{73}	—	January 5, 2000	Socorro	LINEAR	·	3.6 km	MPC · JPL
80536	2000 AT_{74}	—	January 5, 2000	Socorro	LINEAR	·	1.5 km	MPC · JPL
80537	2000 AA_{75}	—	January 5, 2000	Socorro	LINEAR	·	4.2 km	MPC · JPL
80538	2000 AT_{78}	—	January 5, 2000	Socorro	LINEAR	NYS	1.7 km	MPC · JPL
80539	2000 AT_{79}	—	January 5, 2000	Socorro	LINEAR	NYS	2.8 km	MPC · JPL
80540	2000 AZ_{81}	—	January 5, 2000	Socorro	LINEAR	·	1.7 km	MPC · JPL
80541	2000 AL_{82}	—	January 5, 2000	Socorro	LINEAR	·	2.5 km	MPC · JPL
80542	2000 AD_{84}	—	January 5, 2000	Socorro	LINEAR	·	1.7 km	MPC · JPL
80543	2000 AO_{84}	—	January 5, 2000	Socorro	LINEAR	·	1.8 km	MPC · JPL
80544	2000 AZ_{84}	—	January 5, 2000	Socorro	LINEAR	MAS	2.1 km	MPC · JPL
80545	2000 AD_{85}	—	January 5, 2000	Socorro	LINEAR	·	1.5 km	MPC · JPL
80546	2000 AO_{85}	—	January 5, 2000	Socorro	LINEAR	·	2.7 km	MPC · JPL
80547	2000 AR_{85}	—	January 5, 2000	Socorro	LINEAR	V	1.9 km	MPC · JPL
80548	2000 AW_{85}	—	January 5, 2000	Socorro	LINEAR	·	2.3 km	MPC · JPL
80549	2000 AX_{88}	—	January 5, 2000	Socorro	LINEAR	·	2.2 km	MPC · JPL
80550	2000 AK_{89}	—	January 5, 2000	Socorro	LINEAR	·	2.1 km	MPC · JPL
80551	2000 AL_{89}	—	January 5, 2000	Socorro	LINEAR	·	2.3 km	MPC · JPL
80552	2000 AF_{90}	—	January 5, 2000	Socorro	LINEAR	·	2.0 km	MPC · JPL
80553	2000 AN_{90}	—	January 5, 2000	Socorro	LINEAR	NYS	2.5 km	MPC · JPL
80554	2000 AJ_{91}	—	January 5, 2000	Socorro	LINEAR	·	3.2 km	MPC · JPL
80555	2000 AO_{93}	—	January 5, 2000	Socorro	LINEAR	·	1.8 km	MPC · JPL
80556	2000 AB_{95}	—	January 4, 2000	Socorro	LINEAR	V	1.7 km	MPC · JPL
80557	2000 AS_{96}	—	January 4, 2000	Socorro	LINEAR	·	2.6 km	MPC · JPL
80558	2000 AQ_{102}	—	January 5, 2000	Socorro	LINEAR	V	1.4 km	MPC · JPL
80559	2000 AR_{103}	—	January 5, 2000	Socorro	LINEAR	·	1.8 km	MPC · JPL
80560	2000 AX_{103}	—	January 5, 2000	Socorro	LINEAR	·	1.9 km	MPC · JPL
80561	2000 AZ_{104}	—	January 5, 2000	Socorro	LINEAR	·	3.5 km	MPC · JPL
80562	2000 AY_{106}	—	January 5, 2000	Socorro	LINEAR	·	1.8 km	MPC · JPL
80563	2000 AH_{107}	—	January 5, 2000	Socorro	LINEAR	·	1.8 km	MPC · JPL
80564	2000 AX_{109}	—	January 5, 2000	Socorro	LINEAR	·	1.9 km	MPC · JPL
80565	2000 AN_{110}	—	January 5, 2000	Socorro	LINEAR	·	2.2 km	MPC · JPL
80566	2000 AG_{111}	—	January 5, 2000	Socorro	LINEAR	·	1.9 km	MPC · JPL
80567	2000 AQ_{111}	—	January 5, 2000	Socorro	LINEAR	V	1.2 km	MPC · JPL
80568	2000 AJ_{112}	—	January 5, 2000	Socorro	LINEAR	·	2.3 km	MPC · JPL
80569	2000 AG_{115}	—	January 5, 2000	Socorro	LINEAR	·	2.8 km	MPC · JPL
80570	2000 AJ_{115}	—	January 5, 2000	Socorro	LINEAR	·	5.0 km	MPC · JPL
80571	2000 AQ_{116}	—	January 5, 2000	Socorro	LINEAR	·	2.2 km	MPC · JPL
80572	2000 AZ_{116}	—	January 5, 2000	Socorro	LINEAR	PHO	3.8 km	MPC · JPL
80573	2000 AO_{118}	—	January 5, 2000	Socorro	LINEAR	·	2.1 km	MPC · JPL
80574	2000 AO_{119}	—	January 5, 2000	Socorro	LINEAR	·	2.8 km	MPC · JPL
80575	2000 AD_{120}	—	January 5, 2000	Socorro	LINEAR	·	1.7 km	MPC · JPL
80576	2000 AE_{120}	—	January 5, 2000	Socorro	LINEAR	·	1.6 km	MPC · JPL
80577	2000 AQ_{120}	—	January 5, 2000	Socorro	LINEAR	V	1.6 km	MPC · JPL
80578	2000 AJ_{121}	—	January 5, 2000	Socorro	LINEAR	V	1.8 km	MPC · JPL
80579	2000 AF_{123}	—	January 5, 2000	Socorro	LINEAR	·	1.8 km	MPC · JPL
80580	2000 AG_{123}	—	January 5, 2000	Socorro	LINEAR	·	2.4 km	MPC · JPL
80581	2000 AS_{124}	—	January 5, 2000	Socorro	LINEAR	·	4.8 km	MPC · JPL
80582	2000 AY_{125}	—	January 5, 2000	Socorro	LINEAR	V	2.3 km	MPC · JPL
80583	2000 AL_{127}	—	January 5, 2000	Socorro	LINEAR	·	3.1 km	MPC · JPL
80584	2000 AN_{127}	—	January 5, 2000	Socorro	LINEAR	·	1.6 km	MPC · JPL
80585	2000 AV_{128}	—	January 5, 2000	Socorro	LINEAR	ERI	3.8 km	MPC · JPL
80586	2000 AU_{129}	—	January 5, 2000	Socorro	LINEAR	EUN	2.5 km	MPC · JPL
80587	2000 AU_{131}	—	January 3, 2000	Socorro	LINEAR	·	2.8 km	MPC · JPL
80588	2000 AW_{132}	—	January 3, 2000	Socorro	LINEAR	NYS	2.0 km	MPC · JPL
80589	2000 AL_{135}	—	January 4, 2000	Socorro	LINEAR	·	2.8 km	MPC · JPL
80590	2000 AP_{135}	—	January 4, 2000	Socorro	LINEAR	·	2.5 km	MPC · JPL
80591	2000 AA_{136}	—	January 4, 2000	Socorro	LINEAR	ERI	4.0 km	MPC · JPL
80592	2000 AM_{143}	—	January 5, 2000	Socorro	LINEAR	·	2.7 km	MPC · JPL
80593	2000 AG_{144}	—	January 5, 2000	Socorro	LINEAR	·	4.7 km	MPC · JPL
80594	2000 AA_{145}	—	January 5, 2000	Socorro	LINEAR	·	4.0 km	MPC · JPL
80595	2000 AO_{145}	—	January 6, 2000	Socorro	LINEAR	·	1.9 km	MPC · JPL
80596	2000 AZ_{145}	—	January 7, 2000	Socorro	LINEAR	·	2.4 km	MPC · JPL
80597	2000 AD_{147}	—	January 6, 2000	Črni Vrh	Mikuž, H.	V	1.6 km	MPC · JPL
80598	2000 AQ_{147}	—	January 5, 2000	Socorro	LINEAR	·	1.4 km	MPC · JPL
80599	2000 AB_{148}	—	January 5, 2000	Socorro	LINEAR	V	2.4 km	MPC · JPL
80600	2000 AC_{149}	—	January 7, 2000	Socorro	LINEAR	V	1.7 km	MPC · JPL

== 80601–80700 ==
back to top

Designation			Discovery			Properties		Ref
Permanent	Provisional	Named after	Date	Site	Discoverer(s)	Category	Diam.	Ref
80601	2000 AL_{149}	—	January 7, 2000	Socorro	LINEAR	·	3.0 km	MPC · JPL
80602	2000 AH_{153}	—	January 9, 2000	Grasslands	McGaha, J.	·	2.7 km	MPC · JPL
80603	2000 AE_{154}	—	January 2, 2000	Socorro	LINEAR	·	1.6 km	MPC · JPL
80604	2000 AD_{155}	—	January 3, 2000	Socorro	LINEAR	·	1.8 km	MPC · JPL
80605	2000 AP_{155}	—	January 3, 2000	Socorro	LINEAR	·	2.0 km	MPC · JPL
80606	2000 AD_{159}	—	January 3, 2000	Socorro	LINEAR	NYS	2.4 km	MPC · JPL
80607	2000 AN_{159}	—	January 3, 2000	Socorro	LINEAR	·	2.4 km	MPC · JPL
80608	2000 AB_{160}	—	January 3, 2000	Socorro	LINEAR	·	2.3 km	MPC · JPL
80609	2000 AU_{162}	—	January 4, 2000	Socorro	LINEAR	NYS	3.8 km	MPC · JPL
80610	2000 AE_{163}	—	January 5, 2000	Socorro	LINEAR	·	2.1 km	MPC · JPL
80611	2000 AU_{163}	—	January 5, 2000	Socorro	LINEAR	·	2.8 km	MPC · JPL
80612	2000 AM_{167}	—	January 8, 2000	Socorro	LINEAR	PHO	2.9 km	MPC · JPL
80613	2000 AY_{167}	—	January 8, 2000	Socorro	LINEAR	·	3.5 km	MPC · JPL
80614	2000 AO_{168}	—	January 12, 2000	Prescott	P. G. Comba	NYS	2.2 km	MPC · JPL
80615	2000 AK_{170}	—	January 7, 2000	Socorro	LINEAR	·	2.4 km	MPC · JPL
80616	2000 AV_{173}	—	January 7, 2000	Socorro	LINEAR	·	1.8 km	MPC · JPL
80617	2000 AG_{174}	—	January 7, 2000	Socorro	LINEAR	·	2.9 km	MPC · JPL
80618	2000 AO_{175}	—	January 7, 2000	Socorro	LINEAR	·	3.5 km	MPC · JPL
80619	2000 AW_{176}	—	January 7, 2000	Socorro	LINEAR	·	1.9 km	MPC · JPL
80620	2000 AY_{178}	—	January 7, 2000	Socorro	LINEAR	·	3.4 km	MPC · JPL
80621	2000 AQ_{181}	—	January 7, 2000	Socorro	LINEAR	·	3.2 km	MPC · JPL
80622	2000 AD_{182}	—	January 7, 2000	Socorro	LINEAR	V	1.4 km	MPC · JPL
80623	2000 AE_{184}	—	January 7, 2000	Socorro	LINEAR	·	2.0 km	MPC · JPL
80624	2000 AB_{186}	—	January 8, 2000	Socorro	LINEAR	·	1.9 km	MPC · JPL
80625	2000 AN_{193}	—	January 8, 2000	Socorro	LINEAR	·	3.5 km	MPC · JPL
80626	2000 AE_{194}	—	January 8, 2000	Socorro	LINEAR	·	3.0 km	MPC · JPL
80627	2000 AT_{196}	—	January 8, 2000	Socorro	LINEAR	·	2.7 km	MPC · JPL
80628	2000 AP_{197}	—	January 8, 2000	Socorro	LINEAR	·	3.0 km	MPC · JPL
80629	2000 AJ_{204}	—	January 14, 2000	Kleť	Kleť	·	3.3 km	MPC · JPL
80630	2000 AL_{204}	—	January 14, 2000	Kleť	Kleť	·	2.6 km	MPC · JPL
80631	2000 AW_{204}	—	January 10, 2000	Socorro	LINEAR	PHO	2.0 km	MPC · JPL
80632	2000 AL_{205}	—	January 15, 2000	Prescott	P. G. Comba	·	1.8 km	MPC · JPL
80633	2000 AU_{205}	—	January 15, 2000	Višnjan Observatory	K. Korlević	·	2.4 km	MPC · JPL
80634	2000 AV_{209}	—	January 5, 2000	Kitt Peak	Spacewatch	·	1.5 km	MPC · JPL
80635	2000 AL_{211}	—	January 5, 2000	Kitt Peak	Spacewatch	·	2.1 km	MPC · JPL
80636	2000 AV_{214}	—	January 7, 2000	Kitt Peak	Spacewatch	slow?	1.5 km	MPC · JPL
80637	2000 AK_{215}	—	January 7, 2000	Kitt Peak	Spacewatch	(2076)	2.7 km	MPC · JPL
80638	2000 AM_{217}	—	January 8, 2000	Kitt Peak	Spacewatch	L4	18 km	MPC · JPL
80639	2000 AT_{218}	—	January 8, 2000	Kitt Peak	Spacewatch	·	1.1 km	MPC · JPL
80640	2000 AM_{220}	—	January 8, 2000	Kitt Peak	Spacewatch	·	2.2 km	MPC · JPL
80641	2000 AD_{221}	—	January 8, 2000	Kitt Peak	Spacewatch	·	1.9 km	MPC · JPL
80642	2000 AN_{223}	—	January 9, 2000	Kitt Peak	Spacewatch	V	1.6 km	MPC · JPL
80643	2000 AO_{223}	—	January 9, 2000	Kitt Peak	Spacewatch	·	2.1 km	MPC · JPL
80644	2000 AP_{223}	—	January 9, 2000	Kitt Peak	Spacewatch	NYS	2.3 km	MPC · JPL
80645	2000 AN_{227}	—	January 10, 2000	Kitt Peak	Spacewatch	·	3.0 km	MPC · JPL
80646	2000 AG_{233}	—	January 4, 2000	Socorro	LINEAR	·	3.2 km	MPC · JPL
80647	2000 AX_{238}	—	January 6, 2000	Socorro	LINEAR	EUN	2.6 km	MPC · JPL
80648	2000 AZ_{238}	—	January 6, 2000	Socorro	LINEAR	·	2.0 km	MPC · JPL
80649	2000 AF_{239}	—	January 6, 2000	Socorro	LINEAR	·	1.7 km	MPC · JPL
80650	2000 AY_{246}	—	January 5, 2000	Socorro	LINEAR	·	2.2 km	MPC · JPL
80651	2000 AJ_{251}	—	January 4, 2000	Socorro	LINEAR	NYS	2.1 km	MPC · JPL
80652 Albertoangela	2000 BB	Albertoangela	January 16, 2000	Cavezzo	Cavezzo	·	1.8 km	MPC · JPL
80653	2000 BR_{1}	—	January 27, 2000	Kitt Peak	Spacewatch	NYS	2.4 km	MPC · JPL
80654	2000 BE_{2}	—	January 25, 2000	Višnjan Observatory	K. Korlević	·	2.6 km	MPC · JPL
80655	2000 BO_{3}	—	January 27, 2000	Oizumi	T. Kobayashi	·	1.9 km	MPC · JPL
80656	2000 BT_{7}	—	January 29, 2000	Socorro	LINEAR	·	1.8 km	MPC · JPL
80657	2000 BH_{8}	—	January 29, 2000	Socorro	LINEAR	·	2.7 km	MPC · JPL
80658	2000 BP_{8}	—	January 29, 2000	Socorro	LINEAR	·	2.7 km	MPC · JPL
80659	2000 BM_{9}	—	January 26, 2000	Kitt Peak	Spacewatch	MAS	1.4 km	MPC · JPL
80660	2000 BN_{9}	—	January 26, 2000	Kitt Peak	Spacewatch	·	3.3 km	MPC · JPL
80661	2000 BF_{10}	—	January 26, 2000	Kitt Peak	Spacewatch	·	4.2 km	MPC · JPL
80662	2000 BS_{10}	—	January 28, 2000	Kitt Peak	Spacewatch	·	2.2 km	MPC · JPL
80663	2000 BX_{10}	—	January 28, 2000	Les Tardieux Obs.	Boeuf, M.	V	1.6 km	MPC · JPL
80664	2000 BZ_{10}	—	January 26, 2000	Dynic	A. Sugie	·	2.0 km	MPC · JPL
80665	2000 BD_{11}	—	January 28, 2000	Gekko	T. Kagawa	·	2.2 km	MPC · JPL
80666	2000 BP_{14}	—	January 28, 2000	Oizumi	T. Kobayashi	·	2.6 km	MPC · JPL
80667	2000 BA_{15}	—	January 31, 2000	Oizumi	T. Kobayashi	·	3.3 km	MPC · JPL
80668	2000 BD_{15}	—	January 31, 2000	Oizumi	T. Kobayashi	·	2.6 km	MPC · JPL
80669	2000 BR_{15}	—	January 29, 2000	Socorro	LINEAR	·	3.1 km	MPC · JPL
80670	2000 BD_{16}	—	January 29, 2000	Socorro	LINEAR	V	1.6 km	MPC · JPL
80671	2000 BM_{17}	—	January 30, 2000	Socorro	LINEAR	·	1.9 km	MPC · JPL
80672	2000 BU_{17}	—	January 30, 2000	Socorro	LINEAR	(2076)	1.6 km	MPC · JPL
80673	2000 BO_{18}	—	January 30, 2000	Socorro	LINEAR	V	1.4 km	MPC · JPL
80674	2000 BW_{19}	—	January 26, 2000	Kitt Peak	Spacewatch	·	2.3 km	MPC · JPL
80675 Kwentus	2000 BV_{22}	Kwentus	January 30, 2000	Catalina	CSS	·	2.2 km	MPC · JPL
80676	2000 BM_{25}	—	January 30, 2000	Socorro	LINEAR	·	2.3 km	MPC · JPL
80677	2000 BN_{25}	—	January 29, 2000	Kitt Peak	Spacewatch	·	2.0 km	MPC · JPL
80678	2000 BR_{25}	—	January 30, 2000	Socorro	LINEAR	V	1.8 km	MPC · JPL
80679	2000 BR_{28}	—	January 30, 2000	Socorro	LINEAR	fast	2.1 km	MPC · JPL
80680	2000 BW_{29}	—	January 30, 2000	Socorro	LINEAR	·	2.4 km	MPC · JPL
80681	2000 BC_{30}	—	January 30, 2000	Socorro	LINEAR	·	2.8 km	MPC · JPL
80682	2000 BN_{30}	—	January 27, 2000	Višnjan Observatory	K. Korlević	·	1.8 km	MPC · JPL
80683	2000 BP_{30}	—	January 28, 2000	Kitt Peak	Spacewatch	·	1.6 km	MPC · JPL
80684	2000 BW_{32}	—	January 28, 2000	Kitt Peak	Spacewatch	V	1.6 km	MPC · JPL
80685	2000 BB_{33}	—	January 29, 2000	Kitt Peak	Spacewatch	·	1.8 km	MPC · JPL
80686	2000 BX_{33}	—	January 30, 2000	Catalina	CSS	·	3.1 km	MPC · JPL
80687	2000 BL_{34}	—	January 30, 2000	Catalina	CSS	·	2.3 km	MPC · JPL
80688	2000 BO_{34}	—	January 30, 2000	Catalina	CSS	·	3.5 km	MPC · JPL
80689	2000 BB_{36}	—	January 31, 2000	Socorro	LINEAR	·	2.5 km	MPC · JPL
80690	2000 BX_{47}	—	January 27, 2000	Kitt Peak	Spacewatch	MAS	1.0 km	MPC · JPL
80691	2000 BE_{52}	—	January 27, 2000	Kitt Peak	Spacewatch	·	2.5 km	MPC · JPL
80692	2000 CD	—	February 2, 2000	Tebbutt	F. B. Zoltowski	PHO	2.5 km	MPC · JPL
80693	2000 CH	—	February 1, 2000	Prescott	P. G. Comba	·	2.3 km	MPC · JPL
80694	2000 CN	—	February 2, 2000	Prescott	P. G. Comba	·	2.1 km	MPC · JPL
80695	2000 CP	—	February 2, 2000	Prescott	P. G. Comba	MRX	2.2 km	MPC · JPL
80696	2000 CB_{1}	—	February 3, 2000	Višnjan Observatory	K. Korlević	·	3.2 km	MPC · JPL
80697	2000 CC_{1}	—	February 3, 2000	Višnjan Observatory	K. Korlević	·	2.0 km	MPC · JPL
80698	2000 CH_{1}	—	February 4, 2000	Baton Rouge	W. R. Cooney Jr.	·	3.4 km	MPC · JPL
80699	2000 CM_{1}	—	February 4, 2000	Višnjan Observatory	K. Korlević	·	3.1 km	MPC · JPL
80700	2000 CA_{2}	—	February 2, 2000	Uenohara	N. Kawasato	·	3.4 km	MPC · JPL

== 80701–80800 ==
back to top

Designation			Discovery			Properties		Ref
Permanent	Provisional	Named after	Date	Site	Discoverer(s)	Category	Diam.	Ref
80701	2000 CP_{4}	—	February 2, 2000	Socorro	LINEAR	NYS	2.3 km	MPC · JPL
80702	2000 CC_{5}	—	February 2, 2000	Socorro	LINEAR	·	2.9 km	MPC · JPL
80703	2000 CJ_{5}	—	February 2, 2000	Socorro	LINEAR	·	3.9 km	MPC · JPL
80704	2000 CM_{5}	—	February 2, 2000	Socorro	LINEAR	·	1.8 km	MPC · JPL
80705	2000 CU_{8}	—	February 2, 2000	Socorro	LINEAR	NYS	2.6 km	MPC · JPL
80706	2000 CL_{16}	—	February 2, 2000	Socorro	LINEAR	·	3.3 km	MPC · JPL
80707	2000 CD_{17}	—	February 2, 2000	Socorro	LINEAR	·	2.1 km	MPC · JPL
80708	2000 CS_{18}	—	February 2, 2000	Socorro	LINEAR	·	2.8 km	MPC · JPL
80709	2000 CH_{19}	—	February 2, 2000	Socorro	LINEAR	·	2.5 km	MPC · JPL
80710	2000 CK_{19}	—	February 2, 2000	Socorro	LINEAR	·	3.3 km	MPC · JPL
80711	2000 CN_{19}	—	February 2, 2000	Socorro	LINEAR	·	2.2 km	MPC · JPL
80712	2000 CL_{20}	—	February 2, 2000	Socorro	LINEAR	·	2.4 km	MPC · JPL
80713	2000 CM_{20}	—	February 2, 2000	Socorro	LINEAR	NYS	2.5 km	MPC · JPL
80714	2000 CR_{20}	—	February 2, 2000	Socorro	LINEAR	·	2.4 km	MPC · JPL
80715	2000 CO_{21}	—	February 2, 2000	Socorro	LINEAR	V	1.4 km	MPC · JPL
80716	2000 CQ_{21}	—	February 2, 2000	Socorro	LINEAR	·	2.3 km	MPC · JPL
80717	2000 CX_{22}	—	February 2, 2000	Socorro	LINEAR	·	2.5 km	MPC · JPL
80718	2000 CW_{23}	—	February 2, 2000	Socorro	LINEAR	NYS	2.5 km	MPC · JPL
80719	2000 CG_{24}	—	February 2, 2000	Socorro	LINEAR	·	3.1 km	MPC · JPL
80720	2000 CO_{24}	—	February 2, 2000	Socorro	LINEAR	·	2.5 km	MPC · JPL
80721	2000 CS_{24}	—	February 2, 2000	Socorro	LINEAR	·	3.4 km	MPC · JPL
80722	2000 CS_{25}	—	February 2, 2000	Socorro	LINEAR	V	990 m	MPC · JPL
80723	2000 CB_{26}	—	February 2, 2000	Socorro	LINEAR	·	1.9 km	MPC · JPL
80724	2000 CC_{26}	—	February 2, 2000	Socorro	LINEAR	·	2.9 km	MPC · JPL
80725	2000 CD_{26}	—	February 2, 2000	Socorro	LINEAR	NYS	1.8 km	MPC · JPL
80726	2000 CP_{26}	—	February 2, 2000	Socorro	LINEAR	MAS	1.4 km	MPC · JPL
80727	2000 CW_{27}	—	February 2, 2000	Socorro	LINEAR	·	2.5 km	MPC · JPL
80728	2000 CB_{28}	—	February 2, 2000	Socorro	LINEAR	·	3.3 km	MPC · JPL
80729	2000 CS_{28}	—	February 2, 2000	Socorro	LINEAR	NYS	2.5 km	MPC · JPL
80730	2000 CM_{29}	—	February 2, 2000	Socorro	LINEAR	·	2.9 km	MPC · JPL
80731	2000 CQ_{29}	—	February 2, 2000	Socorro	LINEAR	·	2.6 km	MPC · JPL
80732	2000 CK_{30}	—	February 2, 2000	Socorro	LINEAR	·	2.9 km	MPC · JPL
80733	2000 CQ_{31}	—	February 2, 2000	Socorro	LINEAR	·	3.4 km	MPC · JPL
80734	2000 CQ_{32}	—	February 2, 2000	Socorro	LINEAR	·	2.8 km	MPC · JPL
80735	2000 CT_{32}	—	February 2, 2000	Socorro	LINEAR	·	3.7 km	MPC · JPL
80736	2000 CX_{32}	—	February 2, 2000	Socorro	LINEAR	·	2.8 km	MPC · JPL
80737	2000 CA_{33}	—	February 2, 2000	Socorro	LINEAR	·	2.2 km	MPC · JPL
80738	2000 CW_{33}	—	February 4, 2000	Višnjan Observatory	K. Korlević	NYS	3.6 km	MPC · JPL
80739	2000 CK_{34}	—	February 5, 2000	Višnjan Observatory	K. Korlević	slow	2.2 km	MPC · JPL
80740	2000 CX_{34}	—	February 2, 2000	Socorro	LINEAR	·	2.3 km	MPC · JPL
80741	2000 CV_{36}	—	February 2, 2000	Socorro	LINEAR	·	2.9 km	MPC · JPL
80742	2000 CH_{37}	—	February 2, 2000	Socorro	LINEAR	NYS	2.8 km	MPC · JPL
80743	2000 CQ_{37}	—	February 3, 2000	Socorro	LINEAR	MAS	1.5 km	MPC · JPL
80744	2000 CV_{38}	—	February 3, 2000	Socorro	LINEAR	·	2.0 km	MPC · JPL
80745	2000 CD_{39}	—	February 4, 2000	Socorro	LINEAR	·	2.0 km	MPC · JPL
80746	2000 CL_{41}	—	February 2, 2000	Socorro	LINEAR	·	2.5 km	MPC · JPL
80747	2000 CN_{42}	—	February 2, 2000	Socorro	LINEAR	V	1.3 km	MPC · JPL
80748	2000 CE_{43}	—	February 2, 2000	Socorro	LINEAR	V	1.3 km	MPC · JPL
80749	2000 CQ_{43}	—	February 2, 2000	Socorro	LINEAR	·	2.9 km	MPC · JPL
80750	2000 CR_{44}	—	February 2, 2000	Socorro	LINEAR	slow	3.3 km	MPC · JPL
80751	2000 CB_{46}	—	February 2, 2000	Socorro	LINEAR	·	3.1 km	MPC · JPL
80752	2000 CG_{49}	—	February 2, 2000	Socorro	LINEAR	·	1.9 km	MPC · JPL
80753	2000 CO_{49}	—	February 2, 2000	Socorro	LINEAR	·	2.8 km	MPC · JPL
80754	2000 CV_{49}	—	February 2, 2000	Socorro	LINEAR	·	4.9 km	MPC · JPL
80755	2000 CN_{50}	—	February 2, 2000	Socorro	LINEAR	·	3.1 km	MPC · JPL
80756	2000 CK_{52}	—	February 2, 2000	Socorro	LINEAR	·	2.4 km	MPC · JPL
80757	2000 CS_{52}	—	February 2, 2000	Socorro	LINEAR	·	5.3 km	MPC · JPL
80758	2000 CU_{52}	—	February 2, 2000	Socorro	LINEAR	·	3.0 km	MPC · JPL
80759	2000 CL_{53}	—	February 2, 2000	Socorro	LINEAR	·	4.3 km	MPC · JPL
80760	2000 CY_{53}	—	February 2, 2000	Socorro	LINEAR	·	1.8 km	MPC · JPL
80761	2000 CA_{54}	—	February 2, 2000	Socorro	LINEAR	NYS	2.6 km	MPC · JPL
80762	2000 CG_{54}	—	February 2, 2000	Socorro	LINEAR	(5)	4.3 km	MPC · JPL
80763	2000 CM_{55}	—	February 4, 2000	Socorro	LINEAR	·	1.6 km	MPC · JPL
80764	2000 CP_{55}	—	February 4, 2000	Socorro	LINEAR	·	1.8 km	MPC · JPL
80765	2000 CB_{57}	—	February 5, 2000	Socorro	LINEAR	·	2.3 km	MPC · JPL
80766	2000 CT_{57}	—	February 5, 2000	Socorro	LINEAR	NYS	2.6 km	MPC · JPL
80767	2000 CN_{60}	—	February 2, 2000	Socorro	LINEAR	V	1.4 km	MPC · JPL
80768	2000 CP_{60}	—	February 2, 2000	Socorro	LINEAR	V	1.8 km	MPC · JPL
80769	2000 CX_{60}	—	February 2, 2000	Socorro	LINEAR	V	2.1 km	MPC · JPL
80770	2000 CB_{61}	—	February 2, 2000	Socorro	LINEAR	·	9.0 km	MPC · JPL
80771	2000 CJ_{61}	—	February 2, 2000	Socorro	LINEAR	·	3.9 km	MPC · JPL
80772	2000 CX_{61}	—	February 2, 2000	Socorro	LINEAR	·	3.2 km	MPC · JPL
80773	2000 CY_{63}	—	February 2, 2000	Socorro	LINEAR	·	9.9 km	MPC · JPL
80774	2000 CD_{64}	—	February 2, 2000	Socorro	LINEAR	BRU	6.6 km	MPC · JPL
80775	2000 CN_{65}	—	February 4, 2000	Socorro	LINEAR	V	1.4 km	MPC · JPL
80776	2000 CV_{65}	—	February 4, 2000	Socorro	LINEAR	PHO	5.2 km	MPC · JPL
80777	2000 CN_{66}	—	February 6, 2000	Socorro	LINEAR	·	3.4 km	MPC · JPL
80778	2000 CA_{69}	—	February 1, 2000	Kitt Peak	Spacewatch	NYS	2.2 km	MPC · JPL
80779	2000 CP_{76}	—	February 10, 2000	Višnjan Observatory	K. Korlević	·	2.5 km	MPC · JPL
80780	2000 CM_{77}	—	February 8, 2000	Prescott	P. G. Comba	·	2.8 km	MPC · JPL
80781	2000 CD_{78}	—	February 7, 2000	Kitt Peak	Spacewatch	MAS	1.6 km	MPC · JPL
80782	2000 CJ_{78}	—	February 7, 2000	Kitt Peak	Spacewatch	NYS	2.4 km	MPC · JPL
80783	2000 CR_{79}	—	February 8, 2000	Kitt Peak	Spacewatch	·	2.9 km	MPC · JPL
80784	2000 CG_{80}	—	February 8, 2000	Kitt Peak	Spacewatch	·	2.6 km	MPC · JPL
80785	2000 CD_{81}	—	February 4, 2000	Socorro	LINEAR	·	2.7 km	MPC · JPL
80786	2000 CH_{81}	—	February 4, 2000	Socorro	LINEAR	·	3.5 km	MPC · JPL
80787	2000 CM_{83}	—	February 4, 2000	Socorro	LINEAR	·	2.7 km	MPC · JPL
80788	2000 CU_{84}	—	February 4, 2000	Socorro	LINEAR	·	2.3 km	MPC · JPL
80789	2000 CC_{85}	—	February 4, 2000	Socorro	LINEAR	NYS ·	4.9 km	MPC · JPL
80790	2000 CS_{85}	—	February 4, 2000	Socorro	LINEAR	MAS	1.6 km	MPC · JPL
80791	2000 CE_{86}	—	February 4, 2000	Socorro	LINEAR	(5)	2.4 km	MPC · JPL
80792	2000 CN_{86}	—	February 4, 2000	Socorro	LINEAR	·	7.4 km	MPC · JPL
80793	2000 CX_{86}	—	February 4, 2000	Socorro	LINEAR	·	2.4 km	MPC · JPL
80794	2000 CC_{87}	—	February 4, 2000	Socorro	LINEAR	MAS	1.3 km	MPC · JPL
80795	2000 CE_{87}	—	February 4, 2000	Socorro	LINEAR	·	2.6 km	MPC · JPL
80796	2000 CG_{87}	—	February 4, 2000	Socorro	LINEAR	MAS	1.6 km	MPC · JPL
80797	2000 CX_{87}	—	February 4, 2000	Socorro	LINEAR	·	2.1 km	MPC · JPL
80798	2000 CP_{89}	—	February 4, 2000	Socorro	LINEAR	V	2.1 km	MPC · JPL
80799	2000 CV_{94}	—	February 8, 2000	Socorro	LINEAR	·	2.6 km	MPC · JPL
80800	2000 CU_{96}	—	February 6, 2000	Socorro	LINEAR	·	2.8 km	MPC · JPL

== 80801–80900 ==
back to top

Designation			Discovery			Properties		Ref
Permanent	Provisional	Named after	Date	Site	Discoverer(s)	Category	Diam.	Ref
80801 Yiwu	2000 CP_{98}	Yiwu	February 8, 2000	Kitt Peak	Spacewatch	·	2.1 km	MPC · JPL
80802	2000 CD_{99}	—	February 8, 2000	Kitt Peak	Spacewatch	·	2.5 km	MPC · JPL
80803	2000 CX_{100}	—	February 12, 2000	Kitt Peak	Spacewatch	·	2.7 km	MPC · JPL
80804	2000 CG_{102}	—	February 2, 2000	Socorro	LINEAR	·	2.2 km	MPC · JPL
80805	2000 CU_{103}	—	February 8, 2000	Socorro	LINEAR	V	1.8 km	MPC · JPL
80806	2000 CM_{105}	—	February 6, 2000	Kitt Peak	M. W. Buie	cubewano (cold) · moon	157 km	MPC · JPL
80807 Jimloudon	2000 CX_{112}	Jimloudon	February 7, 2000	Catalina	CSS	·	3.6 km	MPC · JPL
80808 Billmason	2000 CU_{114}	Billmason	February 1, 2000	Catalina	CSS	·	2.4 km	MPC · JPL
80809	2000 CX_{114}	—	February 1, 2000	Kitt Peak	Spacewatch	·	1.8 km	MPC · JPL
80810 Georgewinters	2000 CC_{115}	Georgewinters	February 1, 2000	Catalina	CSS	BRA	3.4 km	MPC · JPL
80811	2000 CN_{116}	—	February 3, 2000	Socorro	LINEAR	·	2.4 km	MPC · JPL
80812	2000 CY_{116}	—	February 3, 2000	Socorro	LINEAR	EUN · slow	3.2 km	MPC · JPL
80813	2000 CZ_{120}	—	February 2, 2000	Socorro	LINEAR	·	3.4 km	MPC · JPL
80814	2000 CT_{121}	—	February 3, 2000	Socorro	LINEAR	·	1.7 km	MPC · JPL
80815	2000 CD_{122}	—	February 3, 2000	Socorro	LINEAR	·	4.5 km	MPC · JPL
80816	2000 CR_{122}	—	February 3, 2000	Socorro	LINEAR	·	2.6 km	MPC · JPL
80817	2000 CK_{125}	—	February 3, 2000	Socorro	LINEAR	NYS	2.4 km	MPC · JPL
80818	2000 CY_{125}	—	February 3, 2000	Socorro	LINEAR	·	2.3 km	MPC · JPL
80819	2000 CH_{127}	—	February 3, 2000	Socorro	LINEAR	·	1.7 km	MPC · JPL
80820	2000 CQ_{129}	—	February 3, 2000	Kitt Peak	Spacewatch	·	1.3 km	MPC · JPL
80821	2000 CQ_{137}	—	February 4, 2000	Kitt Peak	Spacewatch	·	1.8 km	MPC · JPL
80822	2000 CD_{140}	—	February 4, 2000	Kitt Peak	Spacewatch	·	2.5 km	MPC · JPL
80823	2000 DP	—	February 23, 2000	Višnjan Observatory	K. Korlević	NYS	4.3 km	MPC · JPL
80824	2000 DX	—	February 24, 2000	Oizumi	T. Kobayashi	·	2.3 km	MPC · JPL
80825	2000 DZ	—	February 24, 2000	Oizumi	T. Kobayashi	·	3.1 km	MPC · JPL
80826	2000 DH_{1}	—	February 26, 2000	Rock Finder	W. K. Y. Yeung	·	3.5 km	MPC · JPL
80827	2000 DV_{1}	—	February 26, 2000	Kitt Peak	Spacewatch	·	1.5 km	MPC · JPL
80828	2000 DF_{2}	—	February 26, 2000	Kitt Peak	Spacewatch	ADE	7.0 km	MPC · JPL
80829	2000 DX_{2}	—	February 27, 2000	Kitt Peak	Spacewatch	·	1.9 km	MPC · JPL
80830	2000 DS_{3}	—	February 25, 2000	Socorro	LINEAR	·	4.0 km	MPC · JPL
80831	2000 DQ_{4}	—	February 28, 2000	Socorro	LINEAR	·	3.4 km	MPC · JPL
80832	2000 DX_{4}	—	February 28, 2000	Socorro	LINEAR	·	3.2 km	MPC · JPL
80833	2000 DR_{5}	—	February 25, 2000	Socorro	LINEAR	·	3.1 km	MPC · JPL
80834	2000 DS_{5}	—	February 25, 2000	Socorro	LINEAR	PHO	2.0 km	MPC · JPL
80835	2000 DK_{7}	—	February 29, 2000	Oizumi	T. Kobayashi	·	3.9 km	MPC · JPL
80836	2000 DU_{7}	—	February 28, 2000	Kitt Peak	Spacewatch	·	1.8 km	MPC · JPL
80837	2000 DV_{7}	—	February 28, 2000	Kitt Peak	Spacewatch	·	1.7 km	MPC · JPL
80838	2000 DJ_{12}	—	February 27, 2000	Kitt Peak	Spacewatch	·	3.0 km	MPC · JPL
80839	2000 DS_{12}	—	February 27, 2000	Kitt Peak	Spacewatch	·	2.6 km	MPC · JPL
80840	2000 DT_{13}	—	February 28, 2000	Kitt Peak	Spacewatch	·	2.0 km	MPC · JPL
80841	2000 DR_{14}	—	February 25, 2000	Catalina	CSS	·	2.7 km	MPC · JPL
80842	2000 DW_{14}	—	February 26, 2000	Catalina	CSS	·	3.9 km	MPC · JPL
80843	2000 DO_{17}	—	February 29, 2000	Socorro	LINEAR	HNS	2.6 km	MPC · JPL
80844	2000 DK_{18}	—	February 28, 2000	Socorro	LINEAR	NYS	2.4 km	MPC · JPL
80845	2000 DZ_{18}	—	February 29, 2000	Socorro	LINEAR	·	4.3 km	MPC · JPL
80846	2000 DL_{19}	—	February 29, 2000	Socorro	LINEAR	·	2.2 km	MPC · JPL
80847	2000 DX_{19}	—	February 29, 2000	Socorro	LINEAR	·	2.0 km	MPC · JPL
80848	2000 DY_{19}	—	February 29, 2000	Socorro	LINEAR	·	2.7 km	MPC · JPL
80849	2000 DM_{20}	—	February 29, 2000	Socorro	LINEAR	NYS	2.1 km	MPC · JPL
80850	2000 DN_{20}	—	February 29, 2000	Socorro	LINEAR	·	1.6 km	MPC · JPL
80851	2000 DX_{20}	—	February 29, 2000	Socorro	LINEAR	EUN	1.8 km	MPC · JPL
80852	2000 DF_{21}	—	February 29, 2000	Socorro	LINEAR	NYS	2.1 km	MPC · JPL
80853	2000 DK_{22}	—	February 29, 2000	Socorro	LINEAR	·	2.1 km	MPC · JPL
80854	2000 DQ_{22}	—	February 29, 2000	Socorro	LINEAR	·	2.6 km	MPC · JPL
80855	2000 DD_{23}	—	February 29, 2000	Socorro	LINEAR	·	2.7 km	MPC · JPL
80856	2000 DF_{23}	—	February 29, 2000	Socorro	LINEAR	·	2.9 km	MPC · JPL
80857	2000 DJ_{24}	—	February 29, 2000	Socorro	LINEAR	·	2.8 km	MPC · JPL
80858	2000 DL_{24}	—	February 29, 2000	Socorro	LINEAR	·	2.2 km	MPC · JPL
80859	2000 DD_{25}	—	February 29, 2000	Socorro	LINEAR	·	2.6 km	MPC · JPL
80860	2000 DZ_{25}	—	February 29, 2000	Socorro	LINEAR	V	2.1 km	MPC · JPL
80861	2000 DU_{26}	—	February 29, 2000	Socorro	LINEAR	MAS	1.6 km	MPC · JPL
80862	2000 DV_{26}	—	February 29, 2000	Socorro	LINEAR	·	1.8 km	MPC · JPL
80863	2000 DT_{27}	—	February 29, 2000	Socorro	LINEAR	·	2.8 km	MPC · JPL
80864	2000 DZ_{27}	—	February 29, 2000	Socorro	LINEAR	·	2.5 km	MPC · JPL
80865	2000 DH_{28}	—	February 29, 2000	Socorro	LINEAR	MAS	1.8 km	MPC · JPL
80866	2000 DN_{28}	—	February 29, 2000	Socorro	LINEAR	MAS	1.8 km	MPC · JPL
80867	2000 DO_{28}	—	February 29, 2000	Socorro	LINEAR	MAS	1.5 km	MPC · JPL
80868	2000 DX_{28}	—	February 29, 2000	Socorro	LINEAR	MAS	1.1 km	MPC · JPL
80869	2000 DA_{31}	—	February 29, 2000	Socorro	LINEAR	·	2.1 km	MPC · JPL
80870	2000 DY_{31}	—	February 29, 2000	Socorro	LINEAR	·	2.7 km	MPC · JPL
80871	2000 DM_{32}	—	February 29, 2000	Socorro	LINEAR	·	2.0 km	MPC · JPL
80872	2000 DN_{33}	—	February 29, 2000	Socorro	LINEAR	·	3.5 km	MPC · JPL
80873	2000 DS_{33}	—	February 29, 2000	Socorro	LINEAR	NYS	2.4 km	MPC · JPL
80874	2000 DF_{35}	—	February 29, 2000	Socorro	LINEAR	·	2.3 km	MPC · JPL
80875	2000 DU_{35}	—	February 29, 2000	Socorro	LINEAR	·	3.2 km	MPC · JPL
80876	2000 DA_{37}	—	February 29, 2000	Socorro	LINEAR	·	2.4 km	MPC · JPL
80877	2000 DR_{37}	—	February 29, 2000	Socorro	LINEAR	MAS	1.0 km	MPC · JPL
80878	2000 DY_{37}	—	February 29, 2000	Socorro	LINEAR	·	3.7 km	MPC · JPL
80879	2000 DB_{39}	—	February 29, 2000	Socorro	LINEAR	·	2.3 km	MPC · JPL
80880	2000 DT_{39}	—	February 29, 2000	Socorro	LINEAR	·	3.0 km	MPC · JPL
80881	2000 DV_{40}	—	February 29, 2000	Socorro	LINEAR	NYS	2.3 km	MPC · JPL
80882	2000 DX_{40}	—	February 29, 2000	Socorro	LINEAR	·	2.4 km	MPC · JPL
80883	2000 DY_{40}	—	February 29, 2000	Socorro	LINEAR	·	2.6 km	MPC · JPL
80884	2000 DC_{42}	—	February 29, 2000	Socorro	LINEAR	·	4.8 km	MPC · JPL
80885	2000 DJ_{42}	—	February 29, 2000	Socorro	LINEAR	NYS	2.2 km	MPC · JPL
80886	2000 DO_{42}	—	February 29, 2000	Socorro	LINEAR	·	2.7 km	MPC · JPL
80887	2000 DQ_{42}	—	February 29, 2000	Socorro	LINEAR	(5)	2.6 km	MPC · JPL
80888	2000 DT_{42}	—	February 29, 2000	Socorro	LINEAR	MRX	2.4 km	MPC · JPL
80889	2000 DM_{43}	—	February 29, 2000	Socorro	LINEAR	·	2.8 km	MPC · JPL
80890	2000 DY_{45}	—	February 29, 2000	Socorro	LINEAR	·	2.8 km	MPC · JPL
80891	2000 DP_{48}	—	February 29, 2000	Socorro	LINEAR	V	1.2 km	MPC · JPL
80892	2000 DO_{50}	—	February 29, 2000	Socorro	LINEAR	·	2.3 km	MPC · JPL
80893	2000 DL_{51}	—	February 29, 2000	Socorro	LINEAR	·	2.1 km	MPC · JPL
80894	2000 DK_{52}	—	February 29, 2000	Socorro	LINEAR	·	1.9 km	MPC · JPL
80895	2000 DM_{52}	—	February 29, 2000	Socorro	LINEAR	·	1.9 km	MPC · JPL
80896	2000 DF_{53}	—	February 29, 2000	Socorro	LINEAR	·	2.1 km	MPC · JPL
80897	2000 DV_{53}	—	February 29, 2000	Socorro	LINEAR	(5)	2.7 km	MPC · JPL
80898	2000 DA_{54}	—	February 29, 2000	Socorro	LINEAR	(5)	2.1 km	MPC · JPL
80899	2000 DO_{54}	—	February 29, 2000	Socorro	LINEAR	·	2.3 km	MPC · JPL
80900	2000 DQ_{54}	—	February 29, 2000	Socorro	LINEAR	·	2.5 km	MPC · JPL

== 80901–81000 ==
back to top

Designation			Discovery			Properties		Ref
Permanent	Provisional	Named after	Date	Site	Discoverer(s)	Category	Diam.	Ref
80901	2000 DY_{55}	—	February 29, 2000	Socorro	LINEAR	NYS	4.3 km	MPC · JPL
80902	2000 DA_{56}	—	February 29, 2000	Socorro	LINEAR	·	3.2 km	MPC · JPL
80903	2000 DD_{56}	—	February 29, 2000	Socorro	LINEAR	·	2.8 km	MPC · JPL
80904	2000 DO_{56}	—	February 29, 2000	Socorro	LINEAR	(5)	3.8 km	MPC · JPL
80905	2000 DC_{58}	—	February 29, 2000	Socorro	LINEAR	·	2.0 km	MPC · JPL
80906	2000 DK_{58}	—	February 29, 2000	Socorro	LINEAR	·	3.7 km	MPC · JPL
80907	2000 DS_{58}	—	February 29, 2000	Socorro	LINEAR	·	2.0 km	MPC · JPL
80908	2000 DF_{59}	—	February 29, 2000	Socorro	LINEAR	·	2.2 km	MPC · JPL
80909	2000 DL_{59}	—	February 29, 2000	Socorro	LINEAR	NYS	3.0 km	MPC · JPL
80910	2000 DL_{60}	—	February 29, 2000	Socorro	LINEAR	·	2.4 km	MPC · JPL
80911	2000 DT_{60}	—	February 29, 2000	Socorro	LINEAR	·	2.8 km	MPC · JPL
80912	2000 DA_{62}	—	February 29, 2000	Socorro	LINEAR	·	2.5 km	MPC · JPL
80913	2000 DK_{62}	—	February 29, 2000	Socorro	LINEAR	·	2.9 km	MPC · JPL
80914	2000 DE_{63}	—	February 29, 2000	Socorro	LINEAR	MAS	1.2 km	MPC · JPL
80915	2000 DK_{63}	—	February 29, 2000	Socorro	LINEAR	NYS	3.2 km	MPC · JPL
80916	2000 DF_{65}	—	February 29, 2000	Socorro	LINEAR	PHO	2.8 km	MPC · JPL
80917	2000 DN_{67}	—	February 29, 2000	Socorro	LINEAR	·	3.5 km	MPC · JPL
80918	2000 DY_{67}	—	February 29, 2000	Socorro	LINEAR	·	2.0 km	MPC · JPL
80919	2000 DG_{68}	—	February 29, 2000	Socorro	LINEAR	·	2.4 km	MPC · JPL
80920	2000 DV_{69}	—	February 29, 2000	Socorro	LINEAR	·	2.6 km	MPC · JPL
80921	2000 DA_{70}	—	February 29, 2000	Socorro	LINEAR	·	2.3 km	MPC · JPL
80922	2000 DF_{70}	—	February 29, 2000	Socorro	LINEAR	·	3.1 km	MPC · JPL
80923	2000 DF_{73}	—	February 29, 2000	Socorro	LINEAR	·	2.6 km	MPC · JPL
80924	2000 DJ_{73}	—	February 29, 2000	Socorro	LINEAR	·	3.1 km	MPC · JPL
80925	2000 DR_{73}	—	February 29, 2000	Socorro	LINEAR	·	4.0 km	MPC · JPL
80926	2000 DG_{74}	—	February 29, 2000	Socorro	LINEAR	·	3.2 km	MPC · JPL
80927	2000 DJ_{74}	—	February 29, 2000	Socorro	LINEAR	·	2.3 km	MPC · JPL
80928	2000 DL_{75}	—	February 29, 2000	Socorro	LINEAR	(5) · fast	2.0 km	MPC · JPL
80929	2000 DM_{75}	—	February 29, 2000	Socorro	LINEAR	·	2.3 km	MPC · JPL
80930	2000 DV_{75}	—	February 29, 2000	Socorro	LINEAR	·	3.1 km	MPC · JPL
80931	2000 DX_{76}	—	February 29, 2000	Socorro	LINEAR	·	3.4 km	MPC · JPL
80932	2000 DK_{78}	—	February 29, 2000	Socorro	LINEAR	·	2.5 km	MPC · JPL
80933	2000 DQ_{78}	—	February 29, 2000	Socorro	LINEAR	·	2.8 km	MPC · JPL
80934	2000 DM_{79}	—	February 28, 2000	Socorro	LINEAR	·	2.4 km	MPC · JPL
80935	2000 DZ_{79}	—	February 28, 2000	Socorro	LINEAR	NYS	2.9 km	MPC · JPL
80936	2000 DS_{80}	—	February 28, 2000	Socorro	LINEAR	MAS	1.3 km	MPC · JPL
80937	2000 DU_{80}	—	February 28, 2000	Socorro	LINEAR	NYS	2.8 km	MPC · JPL
80938	2000 DA_{83}	—	February 28, 2000	Socorro	LINEAR	·	1.7 km	MPC · JPL
80939	2000 DS_{85}	—	February 29, 2000	Socorro	LINEAR	·	1.6 km	MPC · JPL
80940	2000 DD_{86}	—	February 29, 2000	Socorro	LINEAR	·	2.8 km	MPC · JPL
80941	2000 DN_{86}	—	February 29, 2000	Socorro	LINEAR	·	4.6 km	MPC · JPL
80942	2000 DX_{87}	—	February 29, 2000	Socorro	LINEAR	·	1.9 km	MPC · JPL
80943	2000 DX_{89}	—	February 27, 2000	Kitt Peak	Spacewatch	·	3.1 km	MPC · JPL
80944	2000 DN_{92}	—	February 27, 2000	Kitt Peak	Spacewatch	·	3.9 km	MPC · JPL
80945	2000 DN_{93}	—	February 28, 2000	Socorro	LINEAR	·	2.8 km	MPC · JPL
80946	2000 DX_{94}	—	February 28, 2000	Socorro	LINEAR	·	3.3 km	MPC · JPL
80947	2000 DZ_{95}	—	February 28, 2000	Socorro	LINEAR	·	2.3 km	MPC · JPL
80948	2000 DE_{96}	—	February 29, 2000	Socorro	LINEAR	·	2.2 km	MPC · JPL
80949	2000 DG_{96}	—	February 29, 2000	Socorro	LINEAR	·	3.1 km	MPC · JPL
80950	2000 DJ_{96}	—	February 29, 2000	Socorro	LINEAR	·	2.6 km	MPC · JPL
80951	2000 DK_{96}	—	February 29, 2000	Socorro	LINEAR	·	2.0 km	MPC · JPL
80952	2000 DF_{98}	—	February 29, 2000	Socorro	LINEAR	·	2.5 km	MPC · JPL
80953	2000 DK_{98}	—	February 29, 2000	Socorro	LINEAR	·	3.1 km	MPC · JPL
80954	2000 DZ_{98}	—	February 29, 2000	Socorro	LINEAR	·	3.2 km	MPC · JPL
80955	2000 DL_{101}	—	February 29, 2000	Socorro	LINEAR	·	3.5 km	MPC · JPL
80956	2000 DV_{101}	—	February 29, 2000	Socorro	LINEAR	ADE	5.5 km	MPC · JPL
80957	2000 DL_{104}	—	February 29, 2000	Socorro	LINEAR	·	6.3 km	MPC · JPL
80958	2000 DM_{104}	—	February 29, 2000	Socorro	LINEAR	·	2.4 km	MPC · JPL
80959	2000 DK_{105}	—	February 29, 2000	Socorro	LINEAR	·	4.9 km	MPC · JPL
80960	2000 DE_{106}	—	February 29, 2000	Socorro	LINEAR	·	3.2 km	MPC · JPL
80961	2000 DU_{106}	—	February 29, 2000	Socorro	LINEAR	·	2.0 km	MPC · JPL
80962	2000 DX_{107}	—	February 28, 2000	Socorro	LINEAR	·	2.0 km	MPC · JPL
80963	2000 DZ_{108}	—	February 29, 2000	Socorro	LINEAR	·	2.0 km	MPC · JPL
80964	2000 DM_{109}	—	February 29, 2000	Socorro	LINEAR	·	4.3 km	MPC · JPL
80965	2000 DE_{111}	—	February 29, 2000	Socorro	LINEAR	·	2.0 km	MPC · JPL
80966	2000 DP_{111}	—	February 29, 2000	Socorro	LINEAR	NYS	3.4 km	MPC · JPL
80967	2000 DV_{111}	—	February 29, 2000	Socorro	LINEAR	·	2.1 km	MPC · JPL
80968	2000 DK_{112}	—	February 29, 2000	Socorro	LINEAR	EUN	3.1 km	MPC · JPL
80969	2000 DL_{112}	—	February 29, 2000	Socorro	LINEAR	·	2.6 km	MPC · JPL
80970	2000 DS_{112}	—	February 29, 2000	Socorro	LINEAR	(5)	4.5 km	MPC · JPL
80971	2000 DX_{114}	—	February 27, 2000	Kitt Peak	Spacewatch	MAS	1.2 km	MPC · JPL
80972	2000 DM_{116}	—	February 25, 2000	Catalina	CSS	·	2.0 km	MPC · JPL
80973	2000 EQ	—	March 3, 2000	Prescott	P. G. Comba	·	2.4 km	MPC · JPL
80974	2000 ER	—	March 3, 2000	Prescott	P. G. Comba	·	5.0 km	MPC · JPL
80975	2000 EX_{1}	—	March 3, 2000	Socorro	LINEAR	MAS	1.1 km	MPC · JPL
80976	2000 EK_{3}	—	March 3, 2000	Socorro	LINEAR	·	3.1 km	MPC · JPL
80977	2000 EE_{7}	—	March 3, 2000	Kitt Peak	Spacewatch	·	2.5 km	MPC · JPL
80978	2000 EG_{8}	—	March 3, 2000	Socorro	LINEAR	MAS	1.2 km	MPC · JPL
80979	2000 EX_{8}	—	March 3, 2000	Socorro	LINEAR	·	2.2 km	MPC · JPL
80980	2000 EV_{9}	—	March 3, 2000	Socorro	LINEAR	·	2.3 km	MPC · JPL
80981	2000 EK_{10}	—	March 3, 2000	Socorro	LINEAR	EUN	2.4 km	MPC · JPL
80982	2000 EU_{12}	—	March 4, 2000	Socorro	LINEAR	·	3.7 km	MPC · JPL
80983	2000 EV_{12}	—	March 4, 2000	Socorro	LINEAR	·	2.6 km	MPC · JPL
80984 Santomurakami	2000 EO_{15}	Santomurakami	March 6, 2000	Kuma Kogen	A. Nakamura	V	1.9 km	MPC · JPL
80985	2000 EN_{16}	—	March 3, 2000	Socorro	LINEAR	·	4.2 km	MPC · JPL
80986	2000 EM_{17}	—	March 4, 2000	Socorro	LINEAR	·	2.3 km	MPC · JPL
80987	2000 EN_{17}	—	March 4, 2000	Socorro	LINEAR	EUN	2.1 km	MPC · JPL
80988	2000 EK_{19}	—	March 5, 2000	Socorro	LINEAR	NYS	2.5 km	MPC · JPL
80989	2000 EC_{23}	—	March 3, 2000	Kitt Peak	Spacewatch	·	2.2 km	MPC · JPL
80990	2000 ER_{23}	—	March 8, 2000	Kitt Peak	Spacewatch	·	4.2 km	MPC · JPL
80991	2000 ES_{24}	—	March 8, 2000	Kitt Peak	Spacewatch	·	2.4 km	MPC · JPL
80992	2000 EK_{25}	—	March 8, 2000	Kitt Peak	Spacewatch	·	2.1 km	MPC · JPL
80993	2000 EY_{26}	—	March 7, 2000	Farpoint	G. Hug	·	4.5 km	MPC · JPL
80994	2000 ES_{27}	—	March 4, 2000	Socorro	LINEAR	V	1.4 km	MPC · JPL
80995	2000 ED_{28}	—	March 4, 2000	Socorro	LINEAR	V	1.5 km	MPC · JPL
80996	2000 ER_{28}	—	March 4, 2000	Socorro	LINEAR	EUN	1.8 km	MPC · JPL
80997	2000 EH_{29}	—	March 5, 2000	Socorro	LINEAR	·	2.8 km	MPC · JPL
80998	2000 EJ_{29}	—	March 5, 2000	Socorro	LINEAR	·	1.9 km	MPC · JPL
80999	2000 EZ_{29}	—	March 5, 2000	Socorro	LINEAR	NYS	2.1 km	MPC · JPL
81000	2000 ED_{31}	—	March 5, 2000	Socorro	LINEAR	·	2.8 km	MPC · JPL

back to top

== See also ==
- Meanings of minor-planet names: 80001–81000
