= List of biophysicists =

This is a list of notable people known for their research in biophysics.

== A ==
- Gary Ackers (American, 1939–2011) — thermodynamics of protein assembly into complexes, protein-DNA interactions and enzyme subunit interactions
- David A. Agard, Protein chemist at the University of California, San Francisco.
- Christian B. Anfinsen (American, 1916–1995) — author of the postulate about spontaneous protein folding, for which he received a Nobel Prize

== B ==
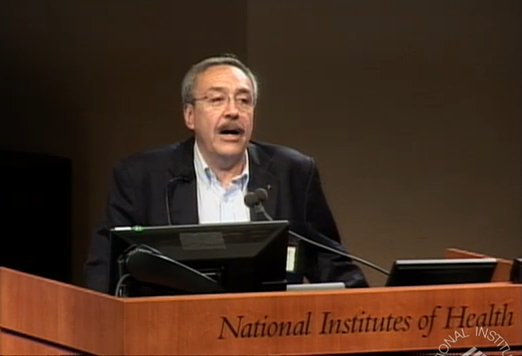
Carlos Bustamante

- David Baker (American, 1962–) — Protein structure prediction; protein design; Rosetta software
- Adriaan (Ad) Bax (Dutch-born American, 1956–) — development of methodology for NMR (Nuclear magnetic resonance) spectroscopy
- Georg von Békésy (Hungarian, 1899–1972) — research on the human ear
- Boris Pavlovich Belousov (Soviet, 1893–1970) — known for discovery of Belousov–Zhabotinsky reaction
- Howard Berg (American, 1934–2021) — characterized properties of bacterial chemotaxis
- Helen M. Berman (American, 1943–) — pioneer in study of nucleic acid structure; head of the worldwide Protein Data Bank
- John Desmond Bernal (Irish-born English, 1901–1971) — X-ray crystallography of plant viruses and proteins
- Pamela J. Bjorkman (American, 1956–) — first X-ray crystallography of human histocompatibility complex; studies immune recognition, homologs of MHC proteins, and improved antibodies against HIV
- Steven Block (American, 1952–) — observed the motions of enzymes such as kinesin and RNA polymerase with optical tweezers
- Tom Blundell (British, 1942–) — crystal structures of HIV protease, renin, insulin and other hormones, growth factors, receptors, and proteins important in cell signalling and DNA repair; developed structure-guided and fragment-based approaches to drug design
- Jagadish Chandra Bose (Indian, 1858–1937). Known for research on microwaves and plant growth
- Detlev Wulf Bronk (American, 1897–1975). Administrator known also for research on nerve conduction.
- Axel Brunger (German American, 1956–) — developed the free R cross-validation index and the X-PLOR/CNS software for macromolecular crystallography
- Carlos Bustamante (Peruvian-born American, 1951–) — known for single-molecule biophysics of molecular motors and biological polymer physics

== C ==
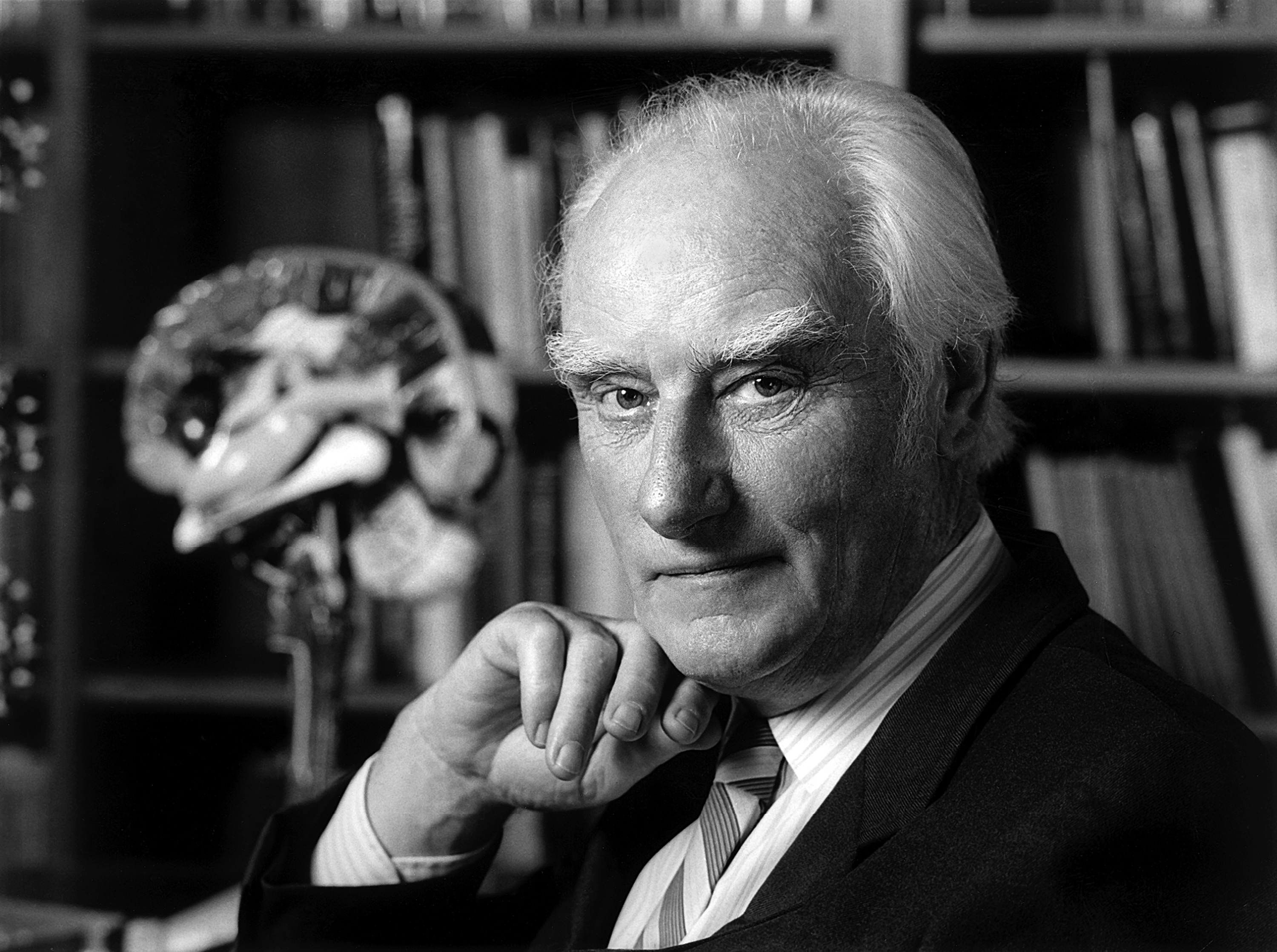
Francis Crick

- Charles Cantor (1942–) — Director, Center for Advanced Biotechnology, Boston University. Cantor is a molecular geneticist who developed pulse field electrophoresis for very large DNA molecules with David C. Schwartz in 1984, by adding an alternating voltage gradient to standard gel electrophoresis.
- Carlos Chagas Filho (Brazilian, 1910–2000) Neuroscientist
- Donald Caspar (American, 1927–2021) — theory of quasi-equivalence in icosahedral viruses
- Alexander Chizhevsky (Soviet, 1897–1964) — founder of heliobiology
- Wah Chiu (Hong Kong-born American, 1947–) — cryo electron microscopy; virus structure; high-resolution cryoEM
- Steven Chu (American, 1948–) — Nobel laureate who helped develop optical trapping techniques used by many biophysicists
- G. Marius Clore FRS (British and American) — pioneer of multidimensional macromolecular NMR spectroscopy laying foundations of 3D structure determination of proteins in solution, and discovery of rare, invisible conformational states of macromolecules
- Carolyn Cohen (American, 1929–2017} — in 1969, Cohen codiscovered the molecular structure of tropomyosin as a polar coiled coil, also being the first protein crystal structure determined with a 20Å resolution via x-ray crystallography. On the route to this discovery, she also discovered a novel crystal structure, termed the Cohen-Longley paracrystal with 400Å periodicity, in 1966.
- Robert Corey (American, 1897–1971) — co-discoverer (with Linus Pauling) of the α helix and β sheet structures in proteins
- Allan McLeod Cormack — development (with Godfrey Hounsfield) of computer assisted tomography
- Christoph Cremer — overcoming the conventional limit of resolution that applies to light based investigations (the Abbe limit) by a range of different methods like SPDM and SMI
- Francis Crick — co-discoverer of the structure of DNA. Later participated in the Crick, Brenner et al. experiment which established the basis for understanding the genetic code.

== D ==
- Johann Deisenhofer (German and American, 1943–) — solved first three-dimensional structure of membrane protein
- Max Delbrück (German, American, 1906–1981) — discovered that bacteria become resistant to phages as a result of genetic mutations. Delbrück, Salvador Luria, and Alfred Hershey shared the 1969 Nobel Prize in Physiology or Medicine "for their discoveries concerning the replication mechanism and the genetic structure of viruses"
- Emilio Del Giudice (Italian, 1940–2014) — water research
- Friedrich Dessauer (German, 1881–1963) — research on radiation, especially X-rays
- Ken A. Dill (American, 1947–) — research on folding pathways of proteins.
- Christopher Dobson (British, 1949–2019) — protein folding and misfolding
- Jennifer Doudna (American, 1964–) — structures of large RNAs; pioneer in CRISPR research
- Leslie Dutton (British and American) — Oxidoreductase function and design.

== E ==
- Richard H. Ebright (American, 1959–) — single-molecule enzymology; structure and function of RNA polymerases
- Gerald M. Edelman (American, 1929–2014) — Nobel laureate, structure of antibodies
- David Eisenberg (American, 1939–) Biochemist and biophysicist working on structural biology and computational molecular biology
- Donald Engelman (American, 1941–) Biophysics working on biological membranes
- Richard R. Ernst (Swiss, 1933–2021) — developer of two-dimensional nuclear magnetic resonance spectroscopy

== F ==
- George Feher (American, 1924–2017) — photosynthesis mechanisms for plants and bacteria
- Julio M. Fernandez (Chilean) – interplay between mechanics and biology
- Alan Fersht (British, 1943–) — pioneered work on protein folding
- Adolf Eugen Fick (German, 1828–1901) — responsible for Fick's law of diffusion and a method to determine cardiac output
- Joachim Frank (German and American, 1940–) — pioneered single-particle reconstruction in electron microscopy; studied structure and dynamics of ribosomes.
- Rosalind Franklin (British, 1920–1958) — pioneer of DNA crystallography and co-discoverer of the structure of DNA
- Clara Franzini-Armstrong (Italian and American, 1938–) Electron microscopy of muscles
- Hans Frauenfelder (American, 1922–2022) — pioneering work on experiment and theory to understand dynamic behavior in protein structure

== G ==
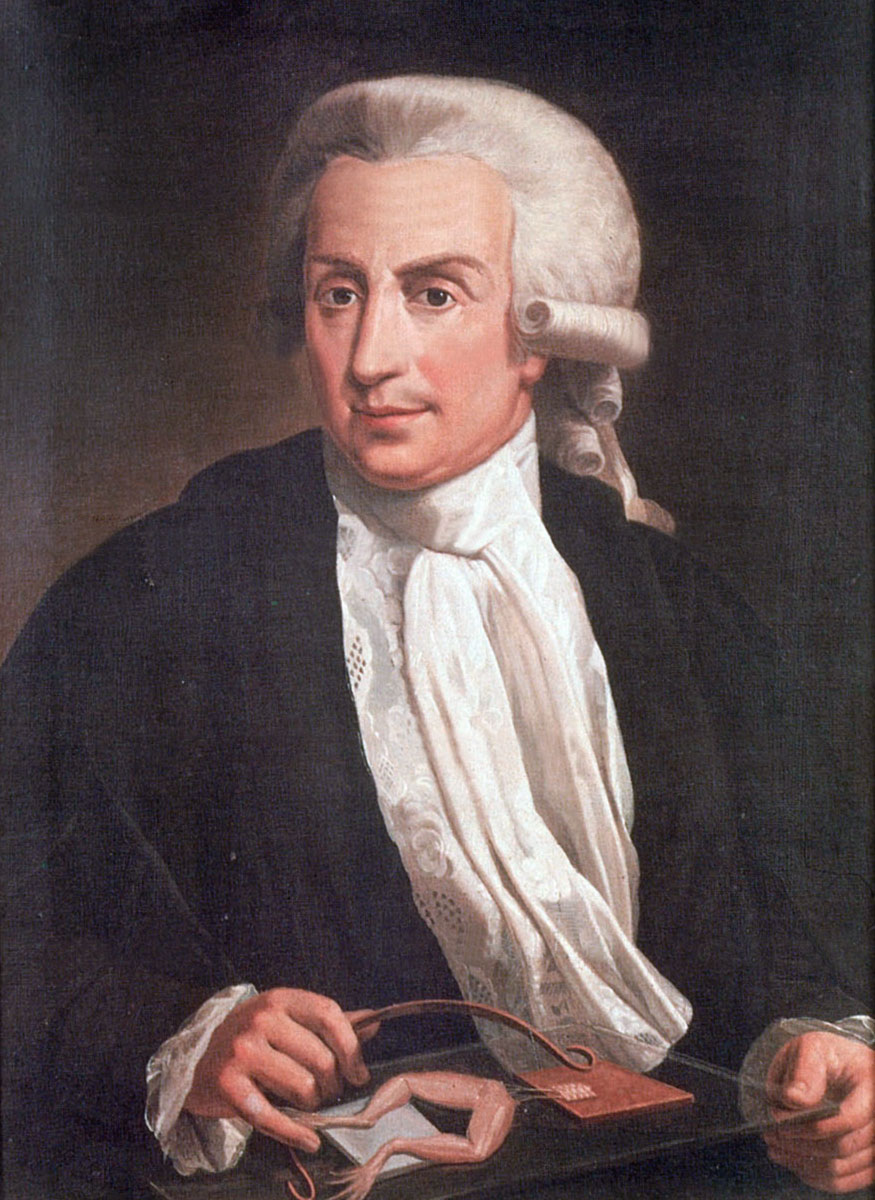
Luigi Galvani

- Luigi Galvani (Italian, 1737–1798) — discoverer of bioelectricity
- Walter Gilbert (American, 1932–) — Nobel laureate; introduced intron/exon concept, proposed RNA world hypothesis
- Martin Gruebele (German and American, 1964–) — Protein Folding

== H ==
- Taekjip Ha (South-Korean-born American, 1968–) — single-molecule biophysics
- Hermann von Helmholtz (Prussian-born German, 1821–1894) — first to measure the velocity of nerve impulses; studied hearing and vision
- Stefan Hell (Romanian and German, 1962–) — developed the principle of STED microscopy
- Richard Henderson (British, 1945–) — scientist at the MRC Laboratory of Molecular Biology, developed the use of cryo-EM to study membrane protein structures.
- Wayne Hendrickson (American, 1941–) — developed robust methods of phasing and refinement for protein crystallography
- A.V. Hill (English, 1886–1977) — Nobel laureate, Hill coefficient for cooperativity in enzyme kinetics, physics of nerves and muscles
- Alan Hodgkin (British, 1914–1998) — mathematical theory of how ion fluxes produce nerve impulses (with Andrew Huxley)
- Dorothy Hodgkin (English, 1910–1994) — winner of the 1964 Nobel Prize in Chemistry, known for determining the structures of penicillin, vitamin B12, and insulin
- Alexander Hollaender (American, 1898–1986) — founded the science of radiation biology; early evidence for nucleic acid as the genetic material
- Barry H. Honig (American, 1941–) — pioneered theory and computation for electrostatics in biological macromolecules
- John J. Hopfield (American, 1933–) — worked on error correction in transcription and translation (kinetic proofreading), and associative memory models (Hopfield net)
- Arthur L. Horwich (American, 1951–) — research into protein folding to understand the action of chaperonins
- Godfrey Hounsfield (British, 1919–2004) — development (with Allan Cormack) of computer assisted tomography
- Wayne L. Hubbell (American, 1943–) — research on the visual system
- Andrew Huxley (British, 1917–2012) — mathematical theory of how ion fluxes produce nerve impulses (with Alan Hodgkin)
- Hugh Huxley (English, 1924–2013) — muscle structure and contraction
- James S. Hyde (American, 1934–2022) — Developer of EPR and MRI instrumentation

== I ==
- Shinya Inoué (Japanese-born American, 1921–2019) — cytoskeletal dynamics

== J ==
- Jagadish Chandra Bose (Indian, 1858–1937) — biologist, physicist, botanist, and an early writer of science fiction
- Louise Johnson (English, 1940–2012) — Crystal structure of lysozyme (1st enzyme) with David Phillips, then glycogen phosphorylase. Wrote influential crystallography textbook with Tom Blundell.

== K ==
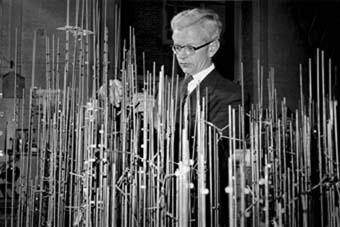
John Kendrew with model of myoglobin in progress.

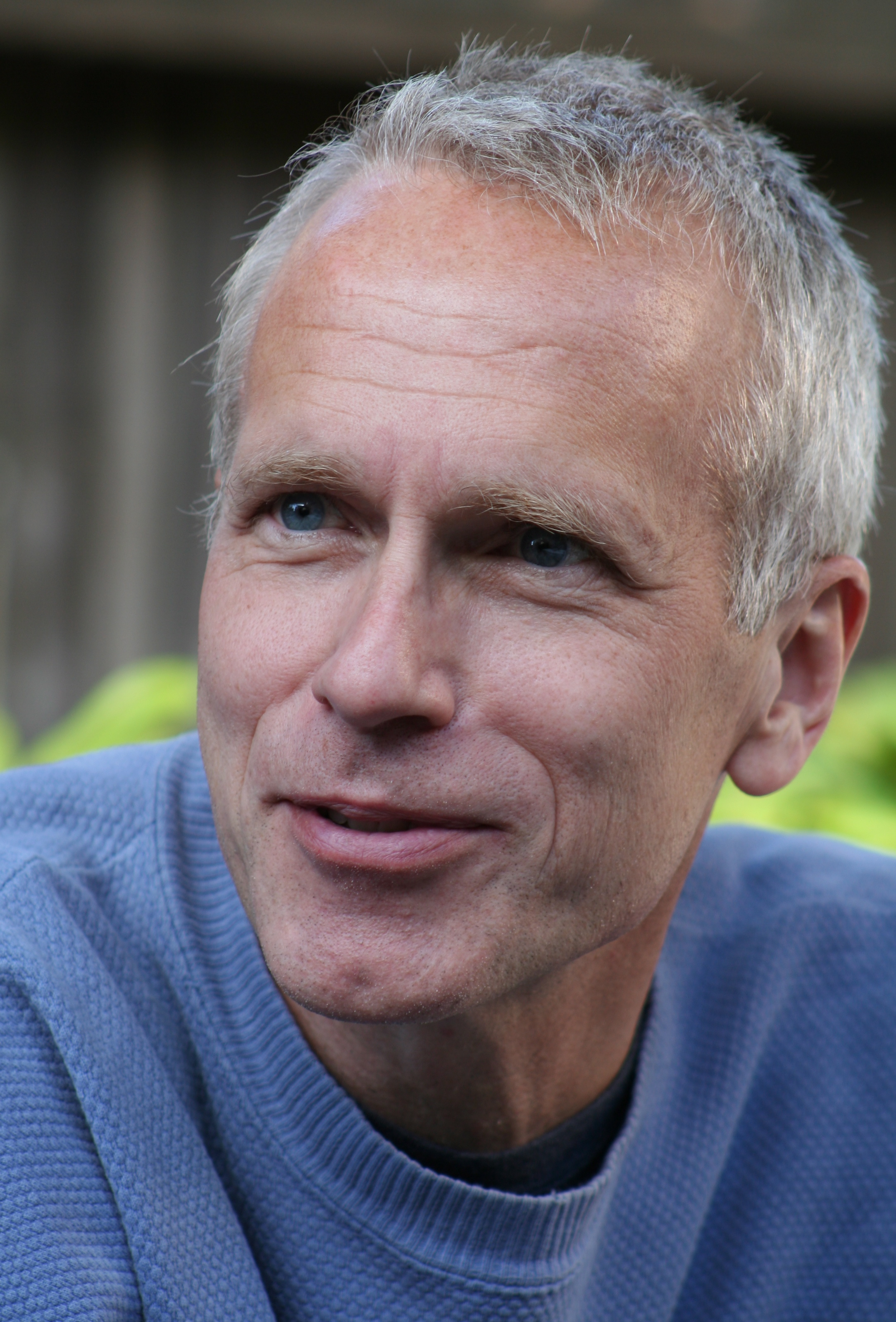
Brian Kobilka

- Martin Karplus (American, 1930–2024) — research on molecular dynamical simulations of biological macromolecules.
- Michael Kasha (American, 1920–2013) — founder of Institute of Molecular Biophysics at Florida State University
- Bernard Katz (British, 1911–2003) — discovered how synapses work
- Ephraim Katzir (Israeli, 1918–2009) — President of Israel and biophysicist involved in enzyme engineering
- Walter Kauzmann (American, 1916–2009) — one of the first to recognize the role of hydrophobic effect in protein folding
- Jeffery W. Kelly (American, 1960–) — protein misfolding and aggregation
- John Kendrew (British, 1917–1997) — pioneer of protein crystallography
- Dorothee Kern (German, 1968–) — studies protein folding with NMR
- Aaron Klug (British, 1926–2018) — winner of the 1982 Nobel Prize in Chemistry for his development of crystallographic electron microscopy and his structural elucidation of biologically important nucleic acid-protein complexes
- Brian Kobilka (American, 1955–) — winner of the 2012 Nobel Prize in Chemistry (with Robert Lefkowitz) for his work on the structure and activity of G-protein-coupled receptors
- Stephen Kowalczykowski (American, PhD 1976) — "visual biochemistry" of DNA repair and homologous recombination
- John Kuriyan (American) – x-ray crystallography of proteins

== L ==
- Robert S. Langer (American, 1948–) — biotechnology, drug delivery, and tissue engineering; Wolf Prize in Chemistry; Priestley Medal
- Paul Lauterbur (American, 1929–2007) — development of magnetic resonance imaging
- Stephen D. Levene (American) — DNA-protein Interactions, DNA looping, and DNA topology
- Michael Levitt (South African, British, American and Israeli, 1947–) — winner of the 2013 Nobel Prize in Chemistry (with Arieh Warshel) for the development of multiscale models for complex chemical systems
- Karolin Luger (Austrian and American) — studies of chromatin and nucleosome structure.

== M ==
- Roderick MacKinnon (American, 1956–) — determined first three-dimensional structure of voltage-gated transmembrane ion channel
- David H. MacLennan (Canadian, 1937–2020) – proteins that regulate calcium flux through the sarcoplasmic reticulum
- Peter Mansfield (British, 1933–2017) — development of magnetic resonance imaging
- Brian W. Matthews (Australian-born American, 1938–) — explicated the energetic and structural effects of mutations in proteins, using phage T4 lysozyme studied by protein crystallography
- Ann McDermott (American, PhD 1988) — study of biological samples using solid-state NMR
- Peter D. Mitchell British, 1920–1992) — developed the chemiosmotic theory of ATP synthesis
- Manuel Morales (Honduran-born American, 1919–2009) — molecular basis of muscle contraction
- Hermann Joseph Muller (American, 1890–1967) — discovered that X-rays cause mutations

== N ==
- Erwin Neher (German, 1944–) — development of the patch clamp and single-channel recording (along with Bert Sakmann)
- Eva Nogales (Spanish and American, PhD 1988) — electron microscopy; microtubule dynamics

== O ==
- Seiji Ogawa (Japanese, 1934–) — development of functional magnetic resonance imaging
- Wilma Olson (American, about 1945–) — interaction between DNA and structural proteins such as histones

== P ==
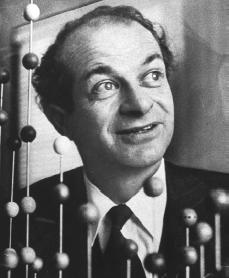
Linus Pauling

- George Palade (Romanian and American, 1912–2008) — protein secretion and cell ultra-structure from electron microscopy studies
- Linus Pauling (American, 1901–1994) — co-discoverer (with Robert Corey) of the α helix and β sheet structures in proteins
- Max Perutz (British of Austrian origin, 1914–2002) — pioneer of protein crystallography
- Ernest C. Pollard (British, 1906–1997) — physics of living cells, founder of the Biophysical Society
- Fritz-Albert Popp (German, 1938–2018) — biophoton research and coherence systems in biology
- Bernard Pullman (French, 1919–1996) — pioneered applications of Quantum Chemistry in Biology

== R ==
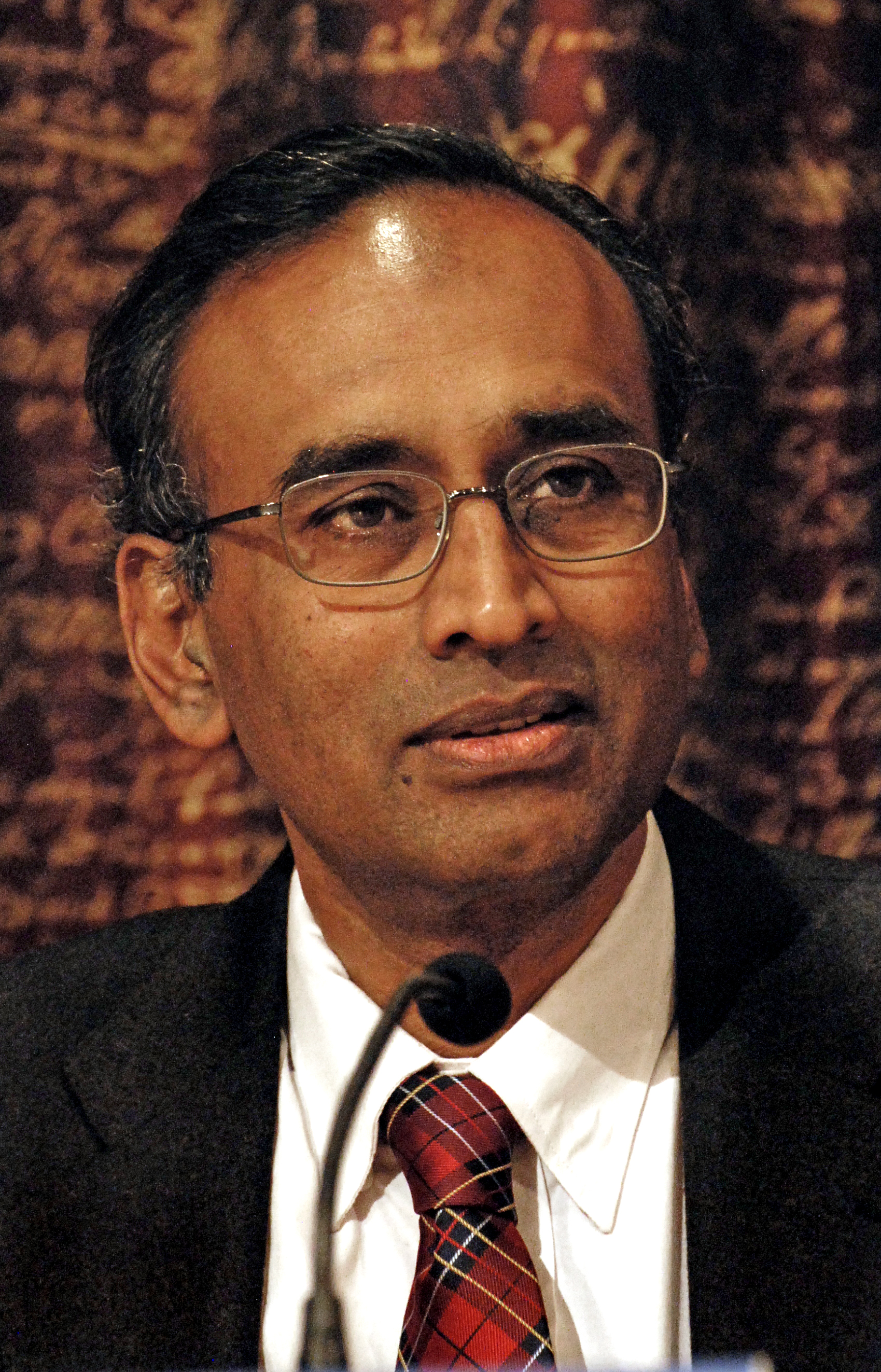
Venki Ramakrishnan

- George Radda (Hungarian and British, 1936–2024) — early developer of Magnetic Resonance Imaging
- Ronald T. Raines (American, 1958–) — structure and function of enzymes and other proteins
- Gopalasamudram Narayana Iyer Ramachandran (Indian, 1922–2001) — known for the Ramachandran plot of protein backbone conformation
- Venkatraman (Venki) Ramakrishnan (Indian-born American and British, 1952– ) — winner of 2009 Nobel Prize in Chemistry (with Steitz and Yonath) for crystal structure of the 30S subunit of the bacterial ribosome
- Ayyalusamy Ramamoorthy (Indian, PhD 1990) — solid-state NMR
- John Randall (British, 1905–1984) — X-ray and neutron diffraction of proteins and DNA
- Zihe Rao (Chinese, 1950–) — structural biologist, member Chinese Academy of Sciences, president of Nankai University
- Nicolas Rashevsky (American of Ukrainian origin, 1899–1972), former Editor of the first journal of mathematical and theoretical biophysics entitled " The Bulletin of Mathematical Biophysics " (1940–1973) and author of the two-factor model of neuronal excitation, biotopology and organismic set theory
- Jacques Ricard (French, 1928–2018) — enzymologist known for the concept of enzyme memory
- Frederic M. Richards (American, 1925–2009) — crystal structure of the ribonuclease S
- Jane Richardson (American, 1941–) — developed the ribbon diagram for representing the 3D structure of proteins; with husband David, developed MolProbity structure-validation web service
- Michael Rossmann (German and American, 1930–2019) — worked with Max Perutz on the crystal structure of hemoglobin, then in his own lab solved structures of enzymes including lactate dehydrogenase, the prototype of the Rossmann fold, and of many viruses including the common cold virus.
- Benoît Roux (Canadian, PhD 1990) — classical molecular dynamics and other theoretical techniques to determine the molecular function of biological systems.

== S ==
- Erich Sackmann (German, 1934–2024) — founder of the bottom-up approach to understanding of the cell mechanics and adhesion
- Bert Sakmann (German, 1942–) — development of the patch clamp and single-channel recording (along with Erwin Neher)
- Francis O. Schmitt (American, 1903–1995) – electron microscopist
- Simon Shnoll (Russian, 1930–2021) — worked in the fields of chemical clocks, Chronobiology and Astrobiology.
- James Spudich (American, 1942-) — molecular motors
- Joan Steitz (American, 1941–) — interaction of ribosomes with messenger RNA
- Thomas A. Steitz (American, 1940–2018) — structure and function of the ribosome
- Lubert Stryer (American, 1938–2024) — interplay of light and life
- Attila Szabo (Hungarian, 1947–) — theoretical analysis of biophysics experiments

== T ==
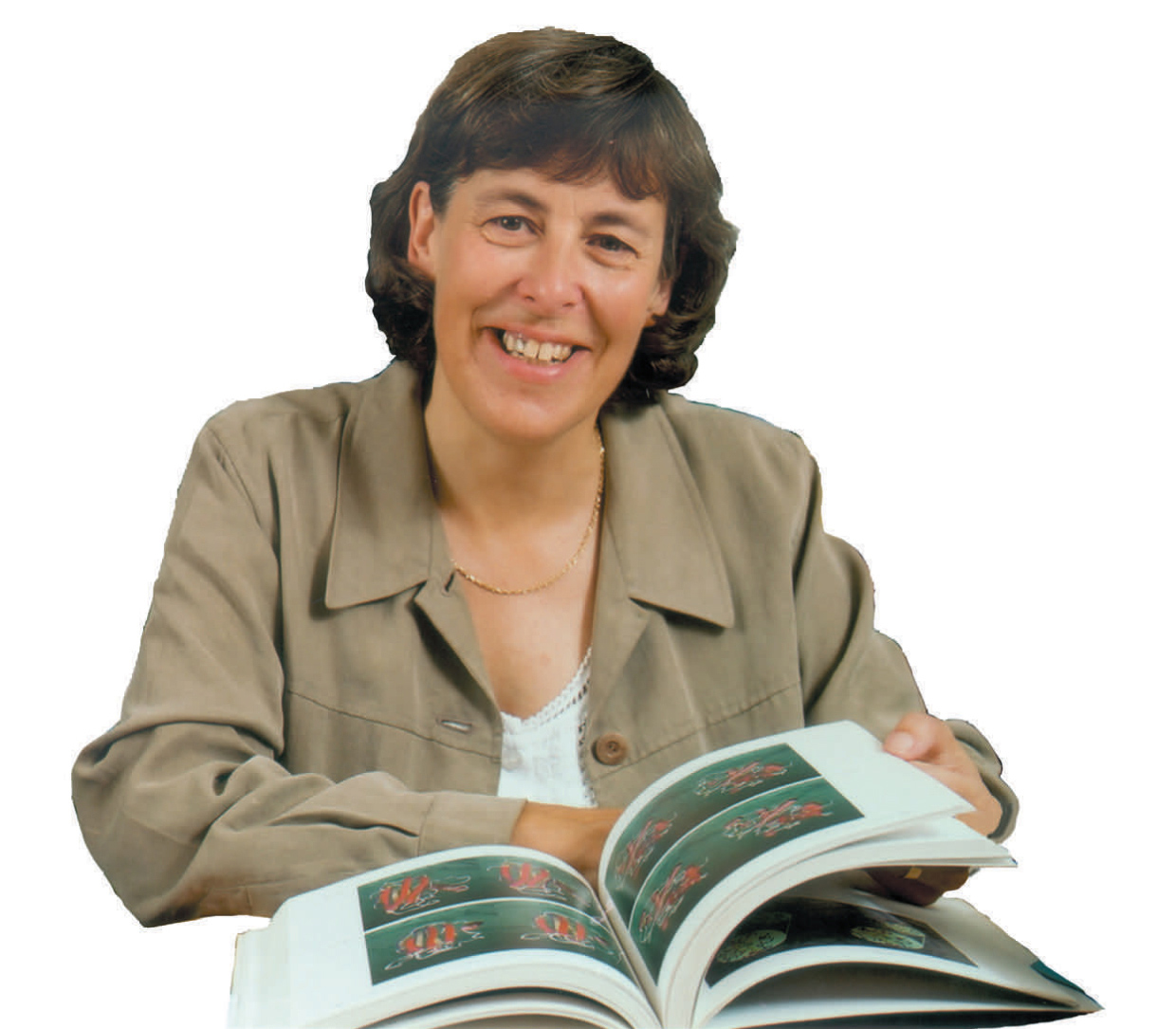
Dame Janet M. Thornton

- Janet Thornton (British, 1949–) — Director of the European Bioinformatics Institute; early pioneer in structural and functional bioinformatics, including the development of ProCheck for structure validation and CATH for protein structure classification
- Nikolay Timofeev-Ressovsky (Russian, 1900–1981) — pioneer of radiation biology
- Ignacio Tinoco (American, 1930–2016) — RNA folding and the secondary structures of ribonucleic acid.
- Chikashi Toyoshima (Japanese, 1954–) — Ca-ATPase ion pump
- Roger Tsien (American, 1952–2016) — Nobel laureate who pioneered the use of green fluorescent protein for biological imaging

== V ==
- Jerome Vinograd (American, 1913–1976) — developed density gradient ultracentrifugation
- Steven Vogel (American, 1940–2015) — biomechanics
- Mikhail Volkenstein (Russian, 1912–1992) — quantum biophysics, chemistry of biopolymers

== W ==
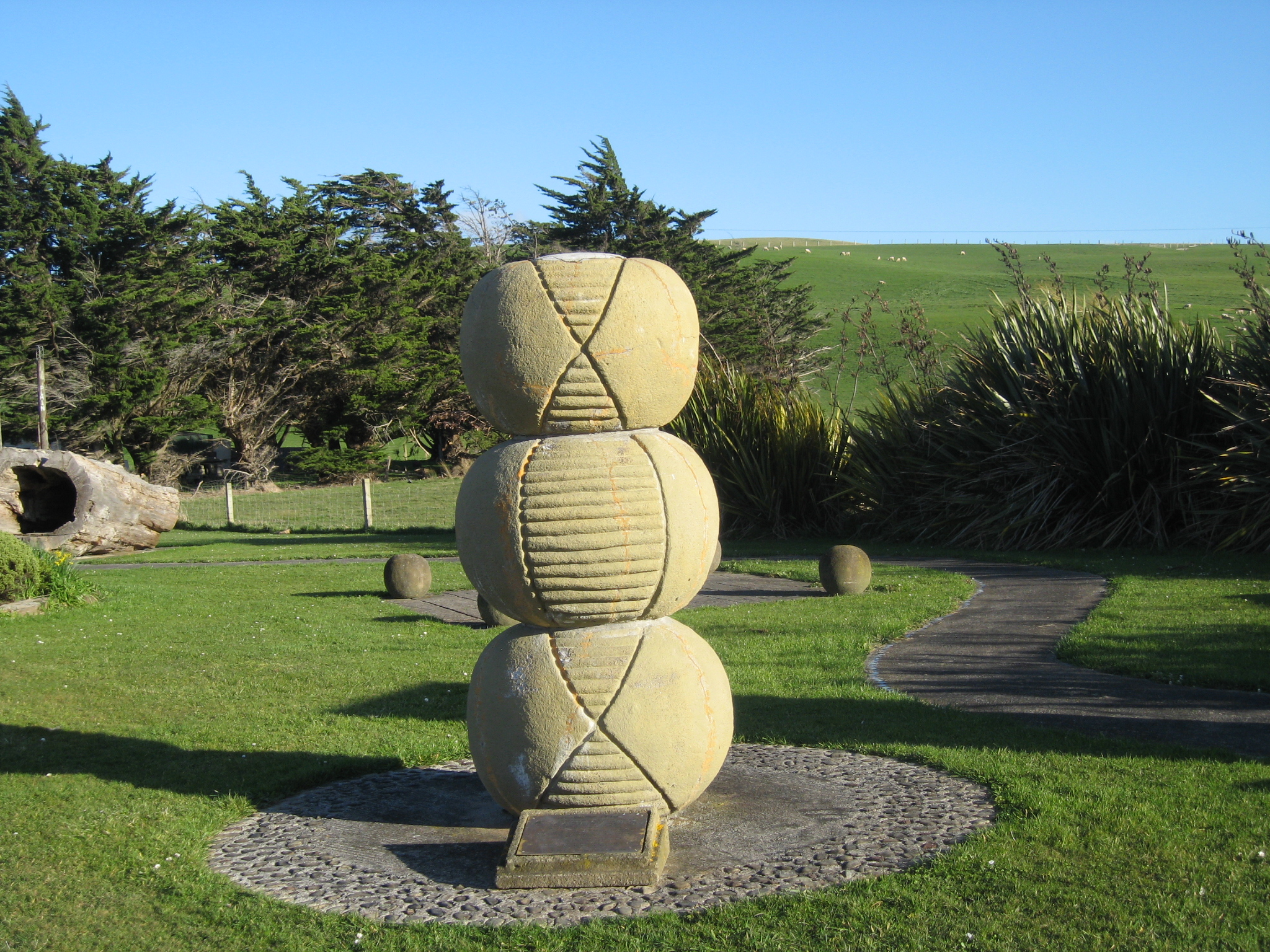
Monument to Maurice Wilkins & DNA, Pongoroa NZ

- Douglas Warrick (American, PhD 1997) — specializing in bird flight (hummingbirds and pigeons)
- Arieh Warshel (Israeli-born American, 1940–) — development of QM/MM approaches for a quantitative understanding of enzymatic reactions; introduction of molecular dynamics simulations in biology; introduction of consistent electrostatic calculations in proteins.
- James D. Watson (American, 1928–2025) — co-discoverer of the structure of DNA.
- Anthony Watts (British, 1950–) — early proponent of the idea of both structural and functional significance of “Lipid-protein interactions”, and developer of solid state NMR for biology.
- Watt W. Webb (American, 1927–2020) — developer of multiphoton microscopy
- Gregorio Weber (Argentinian, 1916–1997) fluorescence spectroscopy and protein chemistry
- John Wikswo (American, 1949–) — biomagnetism and cardiac electrophysiology
- Don Craig Wiley (American, 1944–2001) — applied molecular biophysics to study of viruses
- Maurice Wilkins (New Zealand-born British, 1916–2004) — pioneer of DNA crystallography and co-discoverer of the structure of DNA.
- Kurt Wüthrich (Swiss, 1938–) — Nobel Laureate in physiology or medicine for 2D-FT NMR of protein structure in solution

== X ==
- Sunney Xie (Chinese, 1962) — single-molecule enzymology

== Y ==
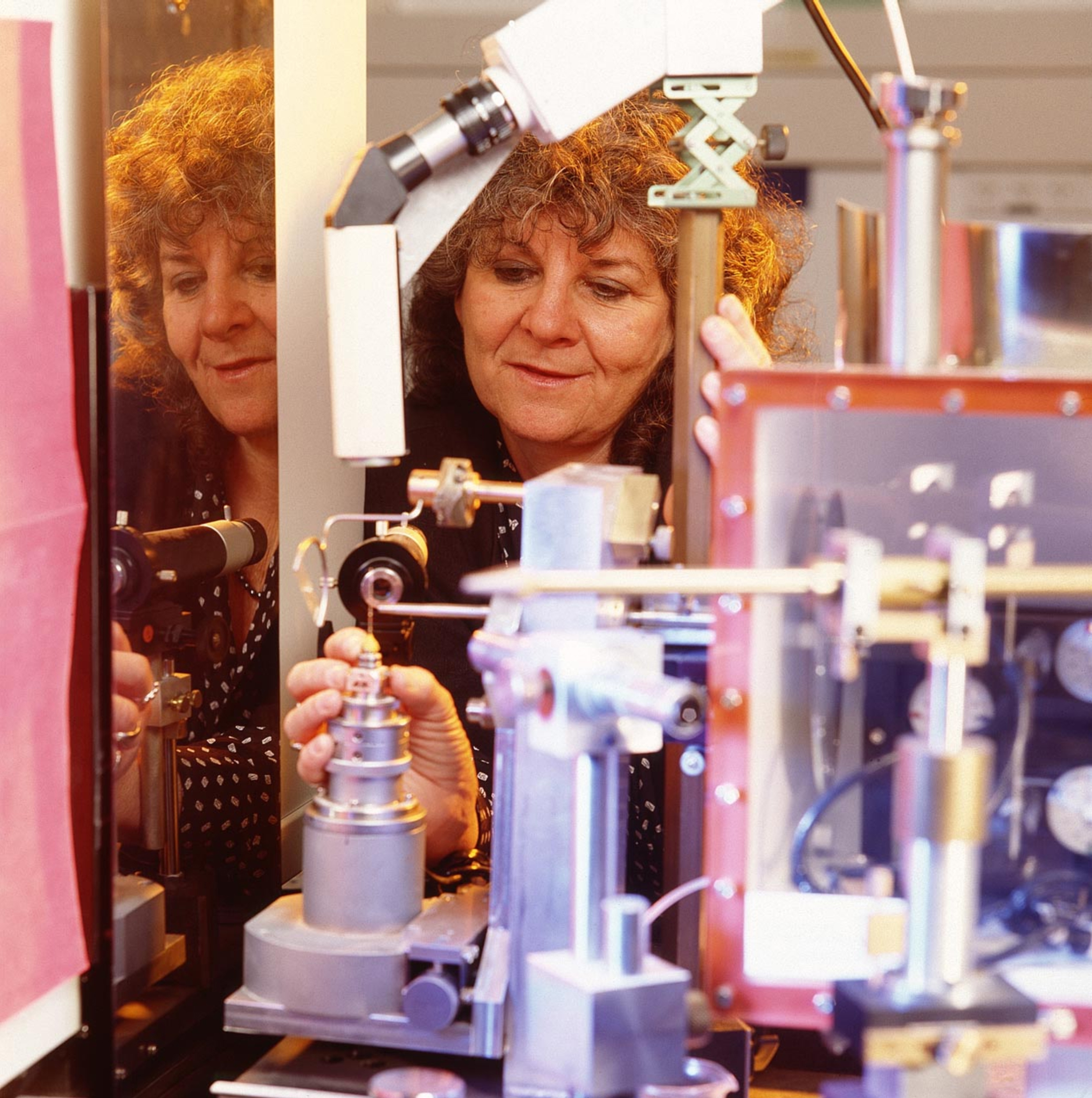
Ada Yonath at the Weizmann Institute

- King-Wai Yau (Chinese-born American, 1948–) — fundamental contributions to understanding the mechanisms of sensory transduction in rod, cone, and non-image visual systems and in olfaction
- Ada Yonath (Israeli, 1939–2026) — winner of the 2009 Nobel Prize in Chemistry (with Steitz and Ramakrishnan) for solving the crystal structure of the large subunit of the ribosome
- Douglas Youvan (American, 1955–) — light reactions of photosynthesis, genetic code, imaging spectroscopy and directed evolution

== Z ==
- Bruno Zimm (American, 1920–2005) — co-developer of the Zimm-Bragg model of helix formation

== See also ==
- List of members of the National Academy of Sciences (Biophysics and computational biology)
- Heineken Prizes
- Alexander Hollaender Award in Biophysics
