= Max Planck Institute for Biology =

Research institute located in Tübingen, Germany

The Max Planck Institute for Biology Tübingen is a research institute located in Tübingen, Germany, and was formerly known as the Max Planck Institute for Developmental Biology. A predecessor institution operated under the same name from 1948 to 2004.

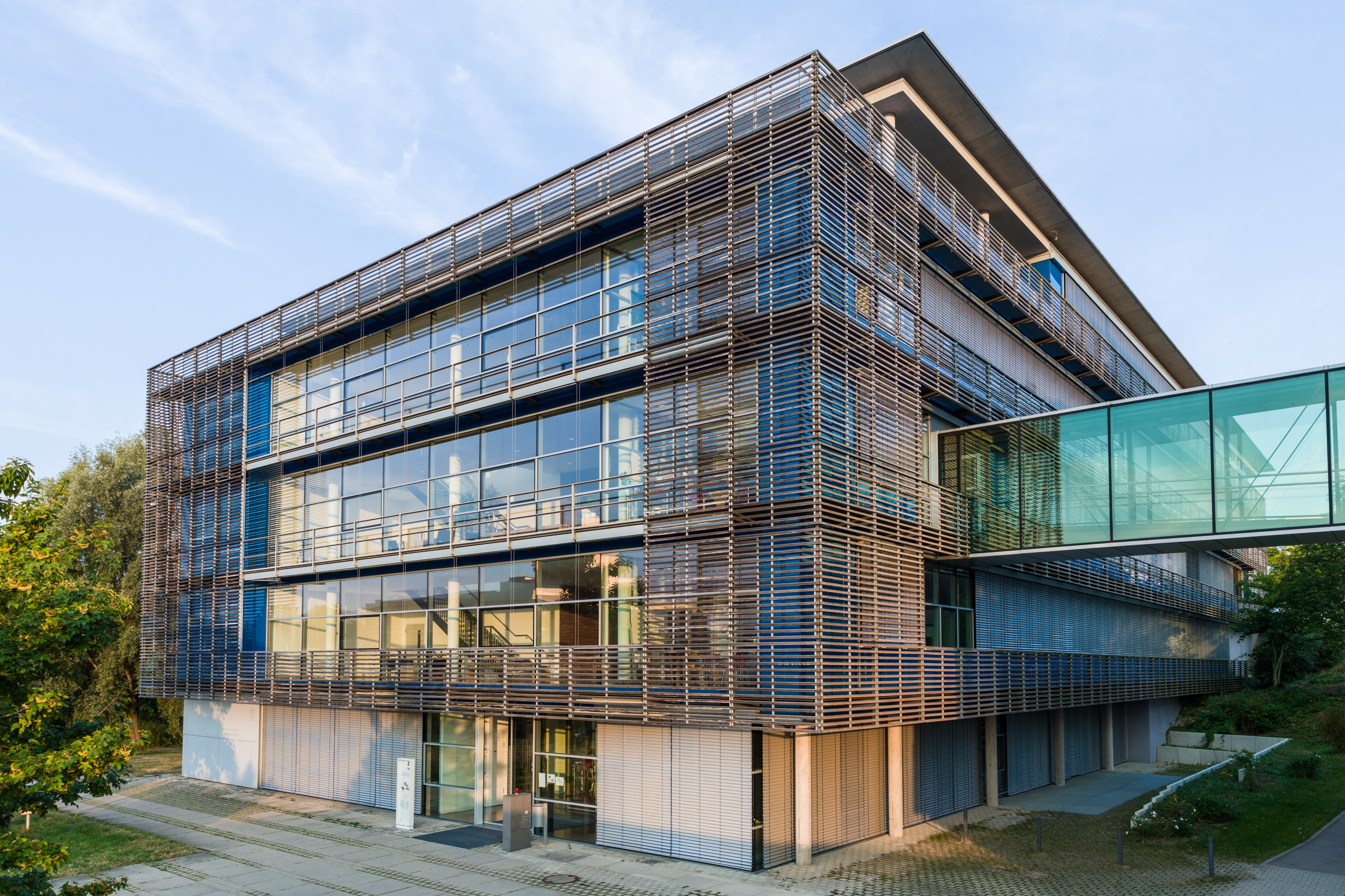
Max Planck Institute for Biology in Tübingen, Germany

The Kaiser Wilhelm Society, the forerunner to the Max Planck Society, established various natural science research institutes in the Berlin district of Dahlem in the beginning of the 20th century. Among them was the Kaiser Wilhelm Institute for Biology. The main aim of the newly established institutes was to supplement the universities and academies with research in the natural sciences and thus also to keep Germany internationally competitive.

In the following decades, scientists there and at the Institute of Biochemistry realized the importance of viruses as model organisms for understanding biological processes. Thus, they established a working group in the field of virus research. In 1941, Nobel Prize winner Adolf Butenandt, together with his colleagues Alfred Kühn and Fritz von Wettstein, set up their own working group for virus research. Two years later, parts of the Kaiser Wilhelm Institute for Biology moved to the safer city of Tübingen. After the foundation of the Max Planck Society in 1948, the institute was renamed as the Max Planck Institute for Biology, which closed in 2004 as part of consolidation measures.

The aforementioned subsidiary institute for virus research had already broadened its base with a new focus on developmental biology, and was renamed as the Max Planck Institute for Developmental Biology in 1985. Christiane Nüsslein-Volhard, who was appointed as Director of Department for Genetics in that year, later won the Nobel Prize for Physiology in 1995.

The Max Planck Institute for Developmental Biology further broadened its research fields, which now range from biochemistry and cell biology to genome research in an evolutionary and ecological context, and was renamed the Max Planck Institute for Biology Tübingen in January 2022.

== Departments ==
The Max Planck Institute has the following departments, with leaders listed

- Protein Evolution - Andrei Lupaș
- Complex Biological Interactions - Yen-Ping Hsueh
- Microbiome Science - Ruth E. Ley
- Evolutionary Biology - Ralf J. Sommer
- Algal Development and Evolution - Susana Coelho
- Molecular Biology - Detlef Weigel (Gottfried Wilhelm Leibniz Prize, Member of the US National Academy of Sciences, Foreign Member of the Royal Society)

== See also ==
- Max Planck Society
