= Wolfgang Baumeister =

German molecular biologist and biophysicist (born 1946)

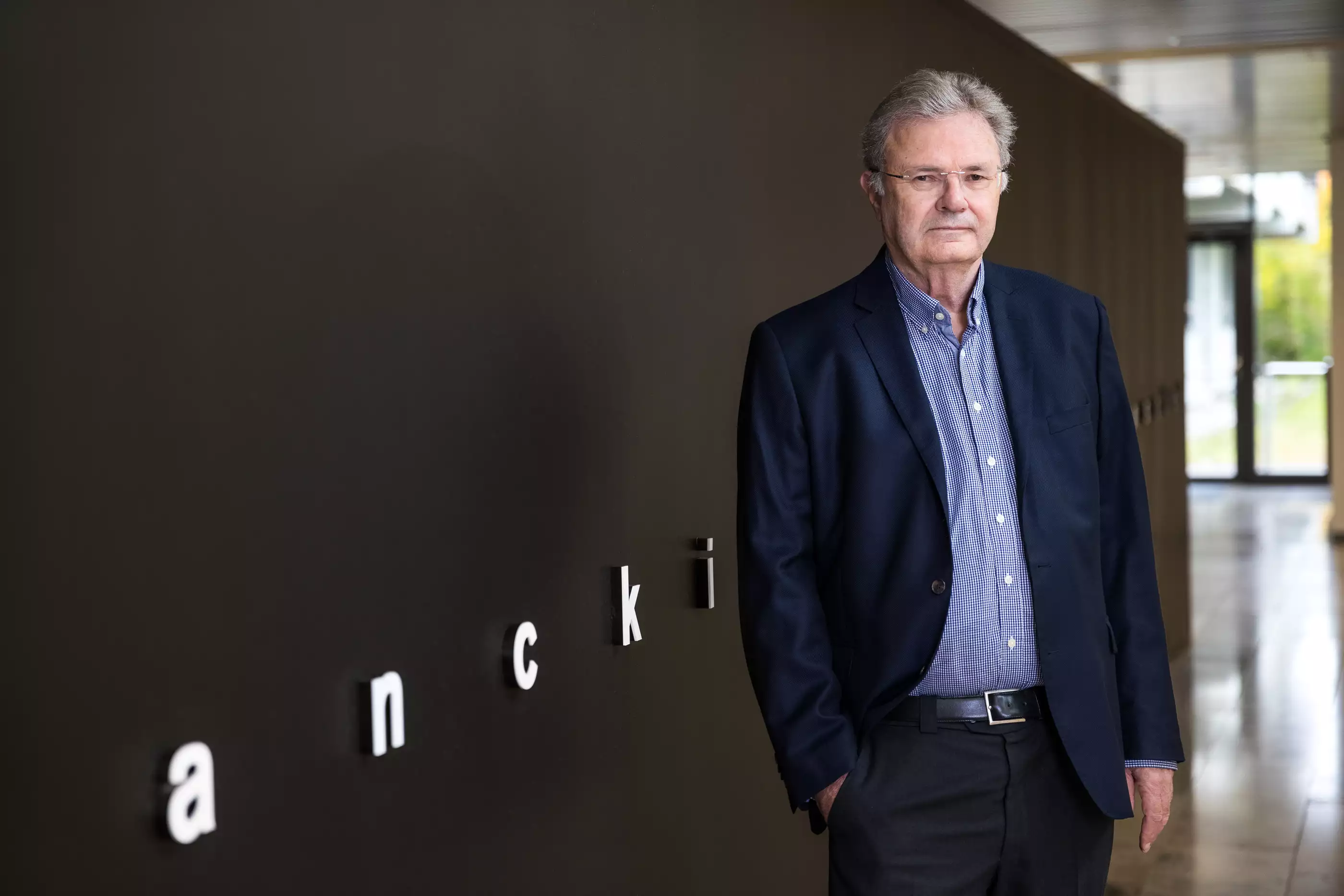
- Born: November 22, 1946 (age 79); Wesseling, Germany
- Education: University of Münster; University of Bonn; Heinrich Heine University Düsseldorf
- Known for: Cryoelectron tomography
- Scientific career
- Institutions: Max Planck Institute of Biochemistry; Technical University of Munich
- Doctoral advisor: Helmut Ruska
- Notable students: Andrei Lupaș (postdoc); Elizabeth Villa (postdoc); Julia Mahamid (postdoc)
- Website: www.biochem.mpg.de/baumeister

Wolfgang P. Baumeister (born 22 November 1946, in Wesseling bordering Cologne) is a German molecular biologist and biophysicist. His research has been pivotal in the development of Cryoelectron tomography.

== Education and career ==
After completing his Abitur, Wolfgang Baumeister studied biology, chemistry, and physics from 1966 to 1967 at the University of Münster and from 1967 to 1969 at the University of Bonn. At the Heinrich Heine University Düsseldorf he was a graduate student from 1970 to 1973 and a research associate from 1973 to 1980 in the department of biophysics. He received his Promotion in 1973 and his Habilitation in 1978. From 1981 to 1982 he was a Heisenberg Fellow at the physics department of the Cavendish Laboratory of England's University of Cambridge.

From 1983 to 1987 he was group leader (with rank C3, Professor Extraordinarius) of the "Molecular Structural Biology" working group at the Max Planck Institute of Biochemistry in Martinsried near Munich. The MPI's research department of "Molecular Structural Biology" does research involving molecular biological structures revealed by electron microscopy, cryoelectron tomography, protein and cell structure, and protein degradation He was an außerplanmäßiger Professor from 1984 to 1987 at the University of Düsseldorf and is since 1987 an außerplanmäßiger Professor in the Faculty of Chemistry of the Technical University of Munich. Since 1988 he is the head of the Max Planck Institute of Biochemistry's department of structural biology. Since 2000 he has also been an honorary professor in the Faculty of Physics of the Technical University of Munich.

Baumeister has served on the editorial boards of several journals, including Current Biology, the Journal of Microscopy, the Journal of Structural Biology, and Trends in Cell Biology. He is now the editor-in-chief of Biochemical and Biophysical Research Communications.

== Honors and awards ==
- 1998 – Otto Warburg Medal
- 2000 – elected a member of the Bavarian Academy of Sciences,
- 2001 – elected a member of the German National Academy of Sciences Leopoldina,
- 2003 – elected fellow of the American Academy of Arts and Sciences.
- 2003 – Louis-Jeantet Prize
- 2003 – I. & H. Wachter Award,
- 2005 – Harvey Prize
- 2005 – Schleiden Medal
- 2006 – Ernst Schering Prize
- 2008 – Bijvoet Medal of the Bijvoet Centre for Biomolecular Research of Utrecht University,
- 2010 – elected a member of the National Academy of Sciences.
- 2018 – Ernst Jung Gold Medal for Medicine.
- 2022 – Alexander Hollaender Award in Biophysics
- 2023 – Rosenstiel Award
- 2025 – Shaw Prize in Life Sciences.
- 2026 – Canada Gairdner International Award.
