= Alexander Hollaender Award in Biophysics =

- Awarded for: Outstanding contributions in biophysics
- Sponsored by: United States National Academy of Sciences
- Country: United States
- First award: 1998

The Alexander Hollaender Award in Biophysics is awarded by the U.S. National Academy of Sciences "for outstanding contributions in biophysics". Named in honor of Alexander Hollaender, it has been awarded every three years since 1998.

The award consists of a prize of $20,000, accompanied by a medal and a diploma, and is presented every three years. Notable recipients of the award include Wayne A. Hendrickson (1998) for his pioneering work in X-ray crystallography, and Wolfgang Baumeister (2022) for his fundamental contributions to structural biology through cryo-electron tomography.

== Recipients of Alexander Hollaender Award in Biophysics ==
Source: National Academy of Sciences

Year	Laureate	Citation
2025	Lewis E. Kay	"For his seminal contributions to expand understanding of protein folding, dynamics, and function."
2022	Wolfgang Baumeister	"For his pioneering contributions in the field of cryogenic electron tomography and obtaining biological insights into large macromolecular assemblies, especially the proteasome, and proteins involved in neurodegeneration."
2019	Jane S. Richardson	"For her innovative contributions to assess quality and accuracy of macromolecular structures through the development of methods for the analysis, representation, and validation of atomic models. Her ribbon representations of protein structures have made them easily comprehensible by the entire scientific community."
2016	Richard Henderson	"For his pioneering work in the determination of atomic structure of a macromolecule by electron microscopy (EM)."
2013	King-Wai Yau	"For innovative, rigorous, and fundamental contributions to the biophysics of sensory transduction in rod, cone, and non-image visual systems and in olfaction."
2010	Watt W. Webb	"For pioneering the applications of rigorous physical principles to the development of optical tools that have broadly impacted our ability to examine biological systems."
2007	Barry H. Honig	"For pioneering theoretical and computational studies of electrostatic interactions in biological macromolecules and of the energetics of protein folding."
2004	Carlos J. Bustamante	"For his ingenious use of atomic force microscopy and laser tweezers to study the biophysical properties of proteins, DNA, and RNA, one molecule at a time."
2001	David J. DeRosier	"For his development of three-dimensional image reconstruction methods, which have revolutionized electron microscopy of subcellular structures, and his analytical visualization of cellular motility mechanisms."
1998	Wayne A. Hendrickson	"For his contributions to macromolecular crystallography, in the development of robust methods of phasing and refinement, and in determination of complex and biologically important structures."

== See also ==
- List of biology awards
- List of physics awards
- Prizes named after people
