= Elizabeth Villa =

American biophysicist

Elizabeth Villa Rodriguez
- Education: University of Illinois Urbana-Champaign; National Autonomous University of Mexico
- Scientific career
- Workplaces: Max Planck Institute of Biochemistry; University of California, San Diego
- Thesis: Multiscale Modeling of Biomolecular Complexes (2008)

Elizabeth Villa is an American biophysicist who is Associate Professor at the University of California, San Diego. Her research considers the development of Cryo Electron Tomography and structural biology. She was named a Howard Hughes Medical Institute Research Investigator in 2021.

== Early life and education ==
Villa grew up in Mexico, which is where she first studied physics. She earned her doctorate at the University of Illinois Urbana-Champaign, where she worked as a Fulbright Fellow. She completed her research in the laboratory of Klaus Schulten on the modeling of biomolecular complexes. During her doctorate, she was introduced to cryogenic electron microscopy, and worked with Joachim Frank on approaches to combine X-ray crystallography with Cryo EM and molecular dynamics. She moved to the Max Planck Institute of Biochemistry as a Marie Skłodowska-Curie Actions as a postdoctoral fellow.

== Research and career ==
Villa joined the Department of Chemistry at the University of California, San Diego in 2014. She was selected a Pew Research Scholar in 2017. In 2021, Villa was named a Howard Hughes Medical Institute Fellow.

Villa has developed novel techniques to explore cellular machinery. This machinery includes bulky molecular complexes, which are composed of nucleic acids, carbohydrates and proteins. Her early work developed tags for Cryo Electron Tomography (cryo-ET), for which she was awarded an National Institutes of Health Director's Award. She developed cryo focused ion beam milling, which makes use of an ion beam to remove ultra-thin layers of cellular material. Images can be acquired from various angles using a transmission electron microscope and reconstructed to form a three-dimensional picture.

Villa determined the structure of the LRRK2 protein. Mutations in LRRK2 are the most frequent cause of Parkinson's disease. The protein includes a 14 Å structure with a pathogenic mutation that forms a right-handed double helix around left-handed tubules. By understanding the 3D structure of LRRK2, Villa hopes to design new treatments for Parkinson's disease.

== Selected publications ==
- James C Phillips; Rosemary Braun; Wei Wang; et al. (December 2005). "Scalable molecular dynamics with NAMD". Journal of Computational Chemistry. 26 (16): 1781–802. doi:10.1002/jcc.20289. ISSN 0192-8651. PMC 2486339. PMID 16222654. Wikidata Q27860718.
- Leonardo G Trabuco; Elizabeth Villa; Kakoli Mitra; Joachim Frank; Klaus Schulten (1 May 2008). "Flexible fitting of atomic structures into electron microscopy maps using molecular dynamics". Structure. 16 (5): 673–683. doi:10.1016/j.str.2008.03.005. ISSN 0969-2126. PMC 2430731. PMID 18462672. Wikidata Q29616808.
- Keren Lasker; Friedrich Förster; Stefan Bohn; et al. (31 January 2012). "Molecular architecture of the 26S proteasome holocomplex determined by an integrative approach". Proceedings of the National Academy of Sciences of the United States of America. 109 (5): 1380–7. Bibcode:2012PNAS..109.1380L. doi:10.1073/pnas.1120559109. ISSN 0027-8424. PMC 3277140. PMID 22307589. Wikidata Q28259014.
