= Joshua Jortner =

Israeli physical chemist (born 1933)

- יהושע יורטנר
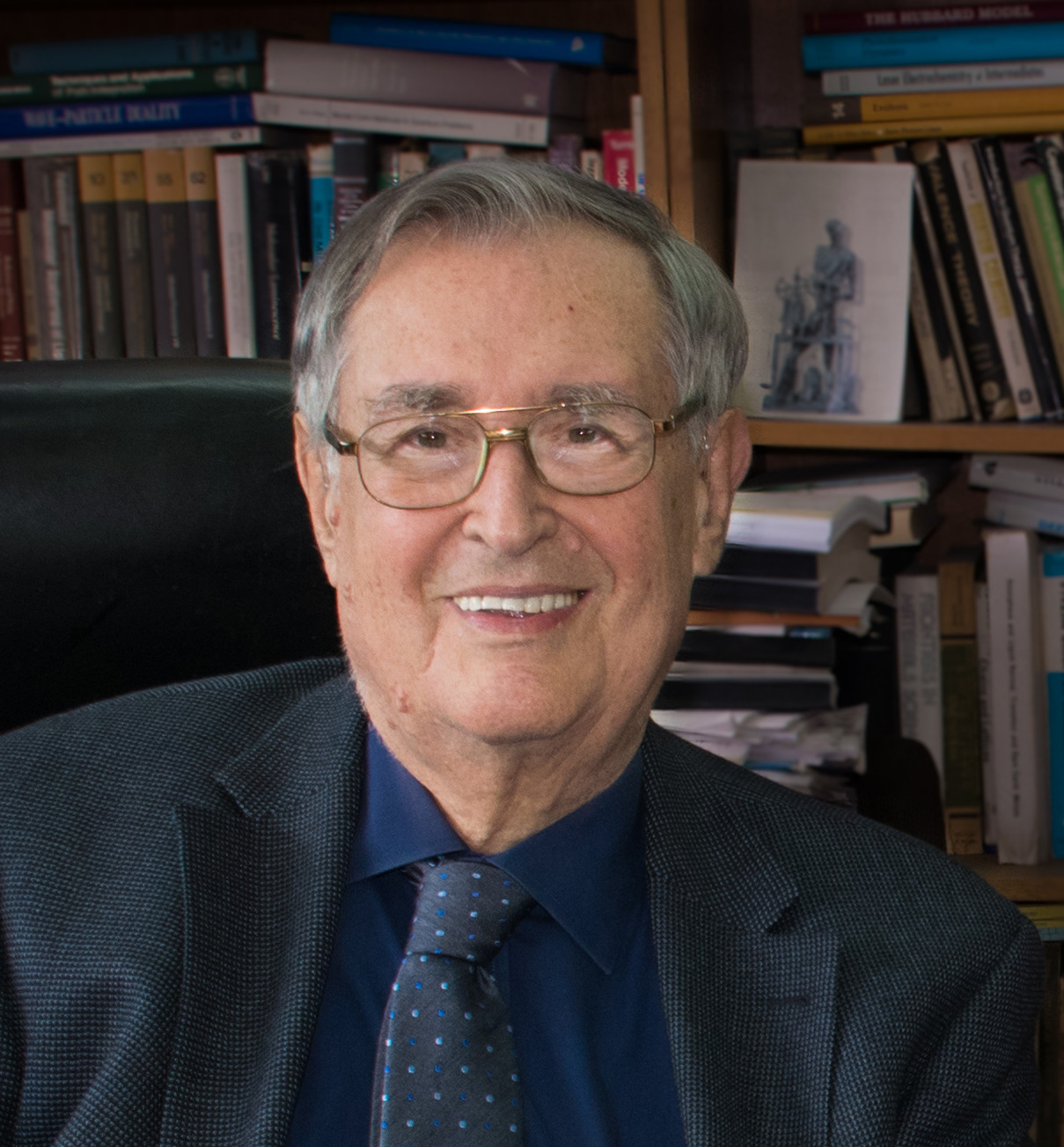
- Born: March 14, 1933 (age 93); Tarnów, Poland
- Education: Hebrew University of Jerusalem; University of Chicago; Tel Aviv University
- Awards: Wolf Prize; Weizmann Prize
- Scientific career
- Fields: Physical chemistry
- Workplaces: Hebrew University of Jerusalem
- Doctoral students: Barry H. Honig; Shaul Mukamel

Joshua Jortner (Hebrew: יהושע יורטנר; March 14, 1933) is an Israeli physical chemist. He is a professor emeritus at the School of Chemistry, The Sackler Faculty of Exact Sciences, Tel Aviv University in Tel Aviv, Israel.

== Birth and education ==
Jortner was born on March 14, 1933, in Tarnów, Poland, to a Jewish family. He migrated with his parents to Palestine under the British Mandate during the Second World War in 1940. He received his Ph.D. from the Hebrew University of Jerusalem in 1960.

== Academic career ==
After completing his Ph.D., Jortner became a lecturer in the Department of Physical Chemistry at the Hebrew University of Jerusalem from 1961 to 1963. From 1962 to 1964, he was a research associate at the University of Chicago. In 1964, he was appointed to a professorship in the Department of Chemistry at Tel Aviv University and was its first chairman. From 1966 to 1972, he was deputy rector, acting rector and vice president of Tel Aviv University. Since 1973, he has held the position of the Heinemann Professor of Chemistry at the School of Chemistry, the Raymond and Beverly Sackler Faculty of Exact Sciences of Tel Aviv University. He also held a professorship at the University of Chicago from 1964 to 1971 as a part-time appointment. He was a visiting professor at the University of Copenhagen in 1974 and 1978 and at the University of California, Berkeley, in 1975.

He also held honorary fellowships, lectureships and chairs at the California Institute of Technology in 1997, St Catherine's College, Oxford, in 1995 and the École Normale Supérieure in Paris from 1998 to 2000. Since 1973, he has been a member of the Israel Academy of Sciences and Humanities and was its president from 1986 to 1995. He is an Honorary Foreign Member of 13 Academies of Sciences in the United States, Europe (The Netherlands, 1998) and Asia.

== Research ==
Jortner has undertaken research on a broad range of areas in both physical and theoretical chemistry, involving dynamical phenomena in chemical systems. His research focuses on the relations between structure, spectroscopy, dynamics and function in microscopic and macroscopic systems. He made some central contributions to the elucidation of the mechanisms of energy acquisition, storage and disposal in large molecules, clusters, condensed phase and biophysical systems, as explored from the microscopic point of view.

He is known for the recognition and elucidation of the intramolecular nature of radiationless dissipation of energy in molecules of large and medium size. Based on a simple theoretical model, in 1968 he proposed, in collaboration with Mordechai Bixon, the basic notions specifying the energy acquisition process, the interstate coupling modes, and the mechanisms of energy disposal were laid open. Subsequently, he developed the theory of molecular wavepacket dynamics and quantum beats.

His contributions became seminal to the study of laser chemistry, multiphoton processes in molecules, relaxation phenomena in condensed phases and the dynamics of biophysical systems, and had an indelible impact on the modern development of chemical physics and theoretical chemistry.

His research covers a vast range of fields, such as the theory of solvated electrons, properties of excited electronic states of molecules, coherent multiphoton processes, charge transfer in polar solvents and in biophysical systems and the dynamics of supercooled large molecules and of molecular clusters.

== Awards ==
- In 1982, Jortner received the Israel Prize, in chemistry.
- In 1988, Jortner was awarded the Wolf Prize in Chemistry along with Raphael David Levine of Hebrew University of Jerusalem for "their incisive theoretical studies elucidating energy acquisition and disposal in molecular systems and mechanisms for dynamical selectivity and specificity".
- In 1990, Jortner was elected an International member of the American Philosophical Society.
- In 1991 Jortner was elected to the American Academy of Arts and Sciences.
- In 1995 he became a member of the German Academy of Sciences Leopoldina.
- In 1997, he was elected an International member of the United States National Academy of Sciences.
- In 2008, he received the "Emet" prize.

== Personal life ==
He is married to Ruth T. Jortner, a cardiologist. His son Roni is a biologist and his daughter Iris is a cellist.

== See also ==
- List of Israel Prize recipients
