= Andrei Lupaș =

German-Romanian biochemist (born 1963)

- Born: September 6, 1963 (age 62); Bucharest, Romania
- Education: Technical University of Munich; Princeton University
- Scientific career
- Institutions: Beecham Pharmaceuticals; Max Planck Institute for Developmental Biology; Max Planck Institute for Biology; Max Planck Institute of Biochemistry
- Doctoral advisor: Jeffry Stock
- Other academic advisors: Andreas Plückthun; Wolfgang Baumeister
- Website: www.eb.tuebingen.mpg.de/de/protein-evolution/

Andrei N. Lupaș (born September 6, 1963) is a German-Romanian biochemist, molecular biologist, and bioinformatician.

== Education and career ==
Lupaș was born in Bucharest, Romania, he began his studies in biology at the Technical University of Munich in 1982 before continuing his studies in molecular biology at Princeton University, where he received his PhD in 1991 with Jeffry Stock on the mechanism of signal transduction in bacterial chemotaxis. He then worked at the Max Planck Institute of Biochemistry in Martinsried in the Wolfgang Baumeister's department until 1997. From 1997 to 2001, he worked at SmithKline Beecham Pharmaceuticals in Collegeville. Since 2001, he has been the Director and Scientific Member at the Max Planck Institute for Developmental Biology (now Max Planck Institute for Biology).

== Research ==
Lupaș' research is largely on bioinformatics in combination with experimental structural biology. His earlier research focused on the prediction of coiled-coil structural elements and of proteins, as well as calculations of structural homologies. Other areas of focus for his research are the origins of early peptides and their evolution into modern domains and ultimately into proteins.

In addition, his research group was involved in the development of the MPI Bioinformatics Toolkit. His research has been funded by the German Research Foundation, the Volkswagen Foundation, the Wellcome Trust, and the Howard Hughes Medical Institute.

Lupaș was one of the judges at CASP14, where AlphaFold won.
