= Max Planck Institute for Biology Tübingen =

German research institute

The Max Planck Institute for Biology Tübingen is a research institute in Tübingen, Germany; it is one of the Max Planck Institutes located throughout Germany. It was founded in 1954 as the Max Planck Institute for Virus Research. From 1984 to 2021, it was named the Max Planck Institute for Developmental Biology. The areas of scientific research conducted at the institute include biochemistry, cell and developmental biology, evolutionary and ecological genetics, functional genomics and bioinformatics, and immunology. The institute's research aims address fundamental questions in microbial, plant, and animal biology, including the interaction between different organisms.

== Departments ==
- Protein Evolution - Andrei Lupaș
- Complex Biological Interactions - Yen-Ping Hsueh
- Microbiome Science - Ruth E. Ley
- Evolutionary Biology - Ralf J. Sommer
- Algal Development and Evolution - Susana Coelho
- Molecular Biology - Detlef Weigel (Gottfried Wilhelm Leibniz Prize, Member of the US National Academy of Sciences, Foreign Member of the Royal Society)
- (former department) Genetics - C. Nüsslein-Volhard (emeritus; Nobel Prize in Physiology or Medicine in 1995, Gottfried Wilhelm Leibniz Prize, Member of the US National Academy of Sciences, Foreign Member of the Royal Society)
- (former department) Cell Biology - Gerd Jürgens (emeritus; Gottfried Wilhelm Leibniz Prize)

== See also ==
- Max Planck Society
