= Joachim Frank =

German-born American biophysicist and Nobel laureate (born 1940)

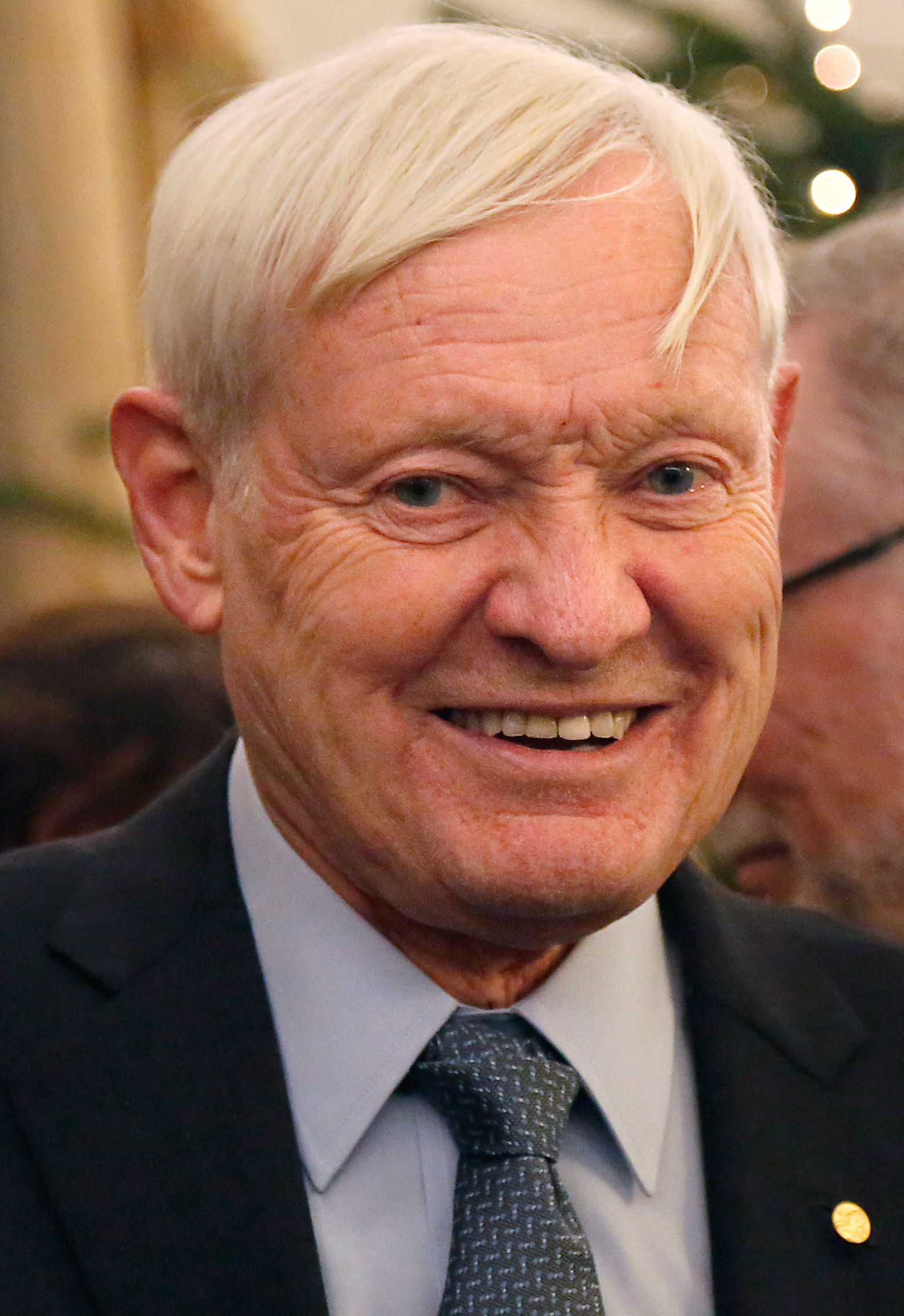
- Joachim Frank under Nobel Prize press conference in Stockholm, December 2017
- Born: September 12, 1940 (age 85); Siegen, Germany
- Citizenship: United States, Germany
- Education: University of Freiburg (BS); LMU Munich (MS); Max Planck Society; Technical University of Munich (PhD) Cornell University
- Known for: Single-particle cryo-electron microscopy Ribosome structure and dynamics
- Spouse: Gerda Cathy Frank (m. 1968) Carol Saginaw (m. 1983)
- Children: Ze Frank & Mariel Frank
- Awards: Benjamin Franklin Medal in Life Science (2014); Wiley Prize in Biomedical Sciences (2017); Nobel Prize in Chemistry (2017); Honorary Fellow of the Royal Microscopical Society (2018)
- Scientific career
- Fields: Structural biology Cryo-electron microscopy
- Institutions: University at Albany, Department of Biomedical Sciences; Columbia University College of Physicians and Surgeons, Department of Biochemistry and Molecular Biophysics
- Thesis: Untersuchungen von elektronenmikroskopischen Aufnahmen hoher Auflösung mit Bilddifferenz- und Rekonstruktionsverfahren (1970)
- Doctoral advisor: Walter Hoppe
- Other academic advisors: Robert Glaeser, Robert Nathan

Joachim Frank (German pronunciation: [ˈjoːaxɪm ˈfʁaŋk]) HonFRMS; born September 12, 1940) is a German-American biophysicist at Columbia University and a Nobel laureate. He is regarded as the founder of single-particle cryo-electron microscopy (cryo-EM), for which he shared the Nobel Prize in Chemistry in 2017 with Jacques Dubochet and Richard Henderson. He also made significant contributions to structure and function of the ribosome from bacteria and eukaryotes.

== Life and career ==
Frank was born in Siegen in the borough of Weidenau. After completing his Vordiplom (B.S.) degree in physics at the University of Freiburg (1963) and his Diplom under Walter Rollwagen's mentorship at LMU Munich with the thesis "Untersuchung der Sekundärelektronen-Emission von Gold am Schmelzpunkt" (Investigation of secondary electron emission of gold at its melting point) (1967), Frank obtained his Ph.D. from the Technical University of Munich for graduate studies in Walter Hoppe's lab at the Max Planck Institut für Eiweiss- und Lederforschung (now Max Planck Institute of Biochemistry) with the dissertation Untersuchungen von elektronenmikroskopischen Aufnahmen hoher Auflösung mit Bilddifferenz- und Rekonstruktionsverfahren (Investigations of high-resolution electron micrographs using image difference and reconstruction methods) (1970). The thesis explores the use of digital image processing and optical diffraction in the analysis of electron micrographs, and alignment of images using the cross-correlation function.

As a Harkness postdoctoral fellow, he had the opportunity to study for two years in the United States: with Robert Nathan at the Jet Propulsion Laboratory, California Institute of Technology; with Robert M. Glaeser at Donner Lab, University of California, Berkeley and with Benjamin M. Siegel at Cornell University, Ithaca, New York. In the fall of 1972 he returned briefly to the Max Planck Institute of Biochemistry in Martinsried as research assistant, working on the theory of partial coherence in electron microscopy, then, in 1973, he joined the Cavendish Laboratory, University of Cambridge as Senior Research Assistant under Vernon Ellis Cosslett.

In 1975 Frank was offered a position of senior research scientist in the Division of Laboratories and Research (now Wadsworth Center), New York State Department of Health, where he started working on single-particle approaches in electron microscopy. In 1985 he was appointed associate and then (1986) full professor at the newly formed Department of Biomedical Sciences of the University at Albany, State University of New York. In 1987 and 1994, he went on sabbaticals in Europe, one to work with Richard Henderson, Laboratory of Molecular Biology Medical Research Council in Cambridge and the other as a Humboldt Research Award winner with Kenneth C. Holmes, Max Planck Institute for Medical Research in Heidelberg. In 1998 Frank was appointed investigator of the Howard Hughes Medical Institute (HHMI). Since 2003 he was also lecturer at Columbia University, and he joined Columbia University in 2008 as professor of Biochemistry and Molecular Biophysics and of biological sciences.

== Awards (selection) ==
- 1994 Humboldt Research Award of the Alexander von Humboldt Foundation
- 2006 Fellow of the American Academy of Arts and Sciences
- 2006 Member of the National Academy of Sciences
- 2014 Benjamin Franklin Medal in Life Science of the Franklin Institute
- 2017 Wiley Prize in Biomedical Sciences
- 2017 Nobel Prize in Chemistry
- 2018 Honorary Doctorate, University of Siegen (Germany)
- 2018 Honorary Fellow of the Royal Microscopical Society

== Selected publications ==
=== Books ===
- Frank, Joachim (2014), Found in Translation – Collection of Original Articles on Single-Particle Reconstruction and the Structural Basis of Protein Synthesis, Singapore: World Scientific Press, ISBN 978-981-4522-80-9.
- Herman, Gabor T.; Frank, Joachim (2014), Computational Methods for Three-Dimensional Microscopy Reconstruction, springer, ISBN 978-1-4614-9520-8.
- Frank, Joachim (2011), Molecular Machines in Biology: Workshop of the Cell, Cambridge: Cambridge University Press, ISBN 978-0-521-19428-0.
- Glaeser, Robert M.; Downing, Ken; Chiu, Wah; Frank, Joachim; DeRosier, David (2007), Electron Crystallography of Biological Macromolecules, Oxford: Oxford University Press, ISBN 978-0-19-508871-7.
- Frank, Joachim (2006), Electron Tomography (2nd ed.), New York: Springer, ISBN 978-0-387-31234-7.
- Frank, Joachim (2006), Three-Dimensional Electron Microscopy of Macromolecular Assemblies (2nd ed.), Oxford: Oxford University Press, ISBN 978-0-19-518218-7.

=== Articles ===
- Frank, Joachim (2015). "Generalized single-particle cryo-EM – a historical perspective". Microscopy. 65 (1): 3–8. doi:10.1093/jmicro/dfv358. PMC 4749046. PMID 26566976.
- Frank, Joachim; Gonzalez, Jr., Ruben L. (2010). "Structure and dynamics of a processive Brownian motor: the translating ribosome". Annu. Rev. Biochem. 79: 381–412. doi:10.1146/annurev-biochem-060408-173330. PMC 2917226. PMID 20235828.
- Frank, Joachim; Spahn, Christian M.T. (2010). "The ribosome and the mechanism of protein synthesis". Rep. Prog. Phys. 69 (5): 1383–1417. doi:10.1088/0034-4885/69/5/R03. S2CID 121917680.
- Frank, Joachim (2009). "Single-particle reconstruction of biological macromolecules in electron microscopy -- 30 years". Q. Rev. Biophys. 42 (3): 139–158. doi:10.1017/S0033583509990059. PMC 2844734. PMID 20025794.
