= Barry H. Honig =

American biochemist

Barry Honig
- Born: Barry H. Honig; November 30, 1941 (age 84)
- Citizenship: United States
- Education: Polytechnic Institute of Brooklyn; Johns Hopkins University; Weizmann Institute of Science
- Awards: Member of the National Academy of Sciences (2004); Alexander Hollaender Award in Biophysics (2007); ISCB Fellow (2016)
- Scientific career
- Fields: Biophysics; Bioinformatics
- Workplaces: Columbia University
- Doctoral advisor: Joshua Jortner
- Website: honig.c2b2.columbia.edu

Barry H. Honig (born 1941) is an American biochemist, molecular biophysicist, and computational biophysicist, who develops theoretical methods and computer software for "analyzing the structure and function of biological macromolecules."

== Education ==
Honig graduated in 1963 from the Polytechnic Institute of Brooklyn with a B.Sc. summa cum laude in chemistry and in 1964 with a M.Sc. degree from Johns Hopkins University. He received his Ph.D. in chemical physics in 1968 from the Weizmann Institute with thesis advisor Joshua Jortner.

== Career and research ==
Honig was a postdoc under Martin Karplus at Harvard from 1968 to 1970 and at Columbia under Cyrus Levinthal from 1970 to 1973. He was an associate professor in the Chemistry Department of the Hebrew University, Jerusalem from 1973 to 1979 and in the Biophysics Department of the University of Illinois Urbana-Champaign from 1979 to1981. Since 1981, Honig has been a professor at the Columbia University Vagelos College of Physicians and Surgeons. He is currently a professor in the Departments of Systems Biology, Biochemistry and Molecular Biophysics and Medicine and is a member of the Zuckerman Mind, Brain Behavior Institute. He was an investigator for the Howard Hughes Medical Institute (HHMI) from 2000 to 2019. He has trained over 100 students and postdocs over the course of his career.

Honig is particularly noted for innovating methods to compute and display the electrostatic potentials of macromolecules based on their 3D structures. The computer programs DelPhi and GRASP were developed in his laboratory and are widely used by the academic and industrial communities.

He has also made seminal contributions to the understanding of the spectroscopic and photochemical properties of visual pigments, to the computational prediction of protein structure and function, to the structural basis of protein-DNA interactions, and to the molecular principles that underlie cell-cell recognition. His current research focus in on the genome-wide prediction of protein-protein interactions and their dysregulation in human disease.

=== Awards and honors ===
Honig is a member of the National Academy of Sciences, the American Academy of Arts and Sciences and Fellow of the American Association for Advancement of Science. He is recipient of numerous awards including: in 2007, the Alexander Hollaender Award in Biophysics from the National Academy for "pioneering theoretical and computational studies of electrostatic interactions in biological macromolecules and of the energetics of protein folding"; and in 2012, the DeLano Award for Computational Biosciences, from the American Society of Biochemistry and Molecular Biology and the Christian B. Anfinsen Award from the Protein Society. He is also an elected fellow of the International Society for Computational Biology (ISCB) and the Biophysical Society.
