= Wayne Hendrickson =

American biophysicist (born 1941)

Wayne A. Hendrickson
- Born: April 25, 1941 (age 85); Spring Valley, Wisconsin, USA
- Education: University of Wisconsin-River Falls; Johns Hopkins University
- Known for: Multi-wavelength Anomalous Dispersion
- Awards: Christian B. Anfinsen Award (1997); Alexander Hollaender Award in Biophysics (1998); Gairdner Foundation International Award (2003); Harvey Prize (2004)
- Scientific career
- Fields: Biochemistry, Molecular Biophysics
- Workplaces: Columbia University
- Doctoral advisor: Warner Love
- Other academic advisors: Jerome Karle

Wayne A. Hendrickson (born April 25, 1941, New York City) is an American biophysicist and university professor at Columbia University. Dr. Hendrickson is a university professor at Columbia University in the department of biochemistry and molecular biophysics. He is also Chief Life Scientist in the Photon Sciences Directorate at Brookhaven National Laboratory and scientific director of the New York Structural Biology Center.

== Early life and education ==
Hendrickson grew up on a farm in Spring Valley, Wisconsin, the son of Norwegian immigrants. He obtained a B.A. in biophysics from University of Wisconsin-River Falls. He later received his Ph.D. in biophysics from Johns Hopkins University with Warner Love, and postdoctoral research experience with Jerome Karle at the Naval Research Laboratory (NRL).

== Scientific contributions ==
Hendrickson is best known for innovating the use of multi-wavelength anomalous dispersion as an analytical tool for protein crystallography.

Hendrickson and his colleagues use biochemistry and x-ray crystallography to study molecular properties in atomic detail with current emphasis on membrane receptors and cellular signaling, on viral proteins and HIV infection, on molecular chaperones and protein folding, and on structural genomics of membrane proteins.

== Recognition ==
Hendrickson's honors include the Aminoff Prize of the Royal Swedish Academy of Sciences, Christian B. Anfinsen Award the Gairdner Foundation International Award, the Harvey Prize, and the thirteenth IUCr Ewald Prize in 2023. He is a fellow of the American Academy of Arts and Sciences and a member of the National Academy of Sciences. On June 2, 1995 he received an honorary doctorate from the Faculty of Science and Technology at Uppsala University, Sweden
