= Jane S. Richardson =

American biophysicist

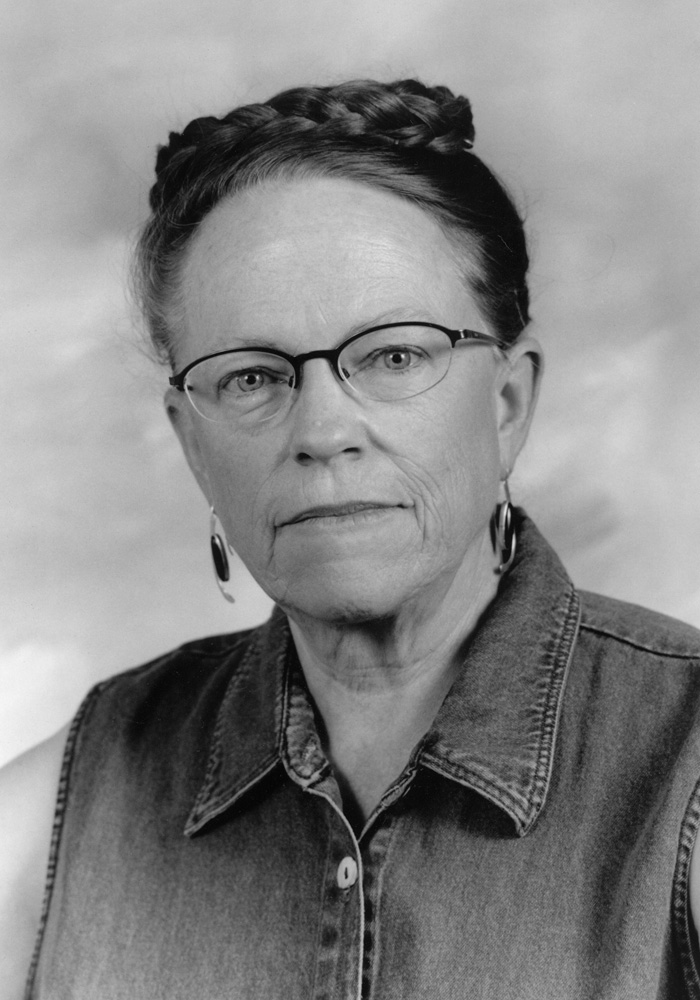
- Richardson in 2002
- Born: January 25, 1941 (age 85); Teaneck, New Jersey, U.S.
- Education: Swarthmore College; Harvard University
- Known for: Ribbon diagram, structure validation
- Spouse: David C. Richardson
- Awards: MacArthur Fellowship (1985), Alexander Hollaender Award in Biophysics (2019)
- Scientific career
- Fields: Structural biology, Biophysics
- Workplaces: Duke University

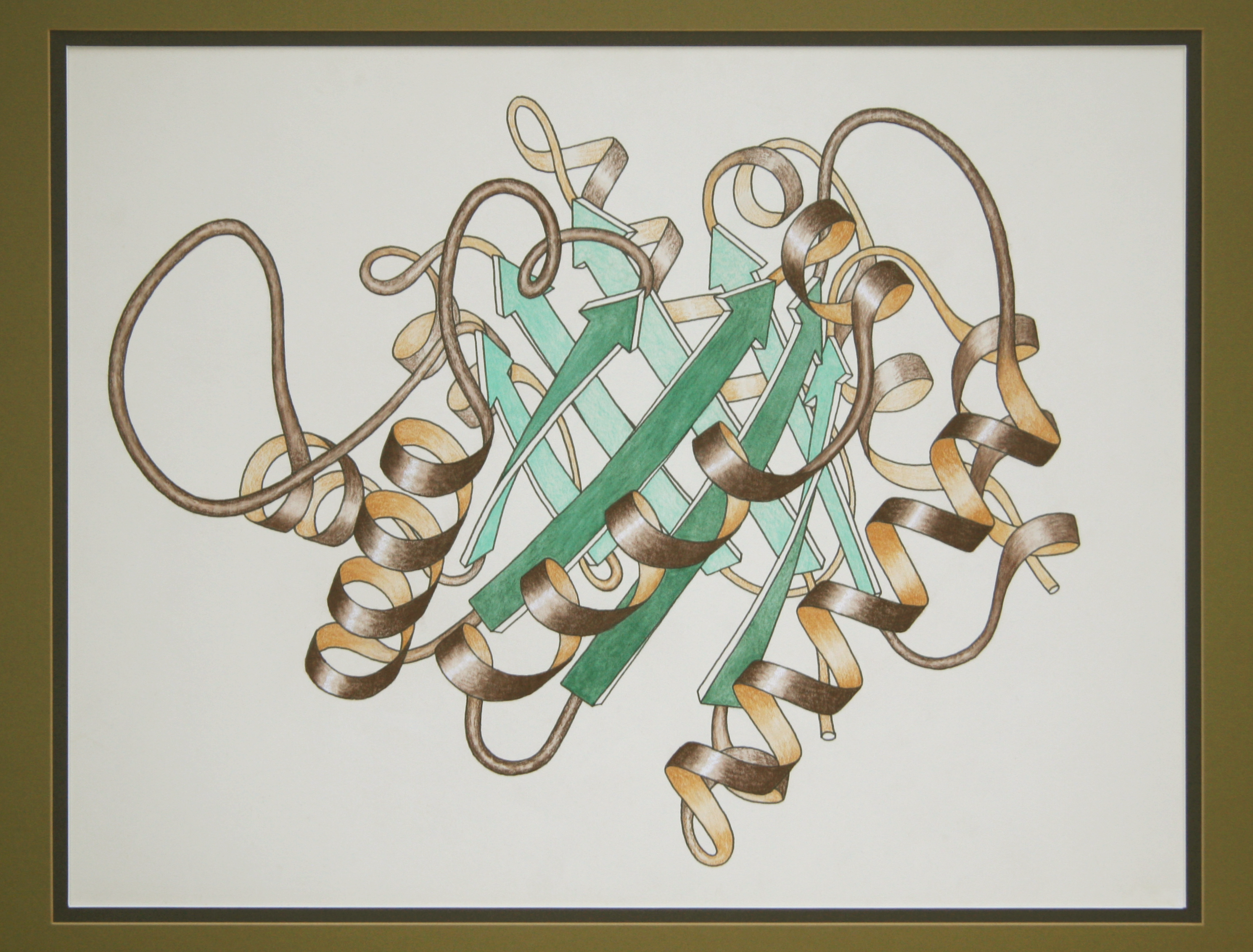
Ribbon schematic of Triosephosphate isomerase, hand-drawn by Jane Richardson

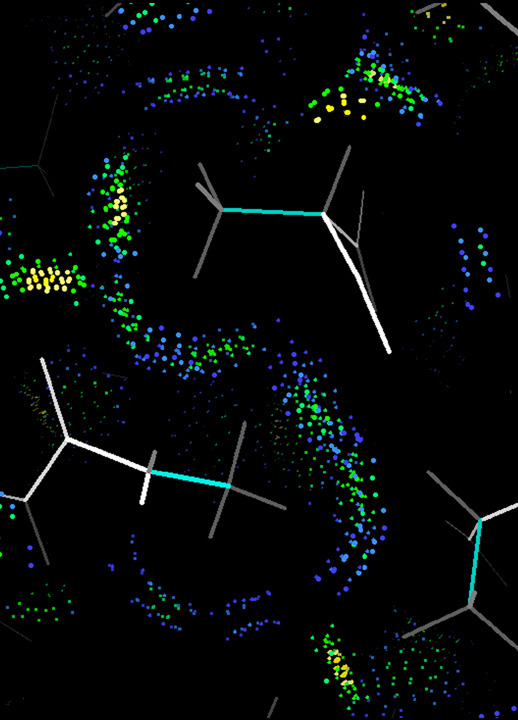
All-atom contact dots for two well-packed Ala residues

Jane Shelby Richardson (born January 25, 1941) is an American biophysicist best known for developing the Richardson diagram, or ribbon diagram, a method of representing the 3D structure of proteins. Ribbon diagrams have become a standard representation of protein structures that has facilitated further investigation of protein structure and function globally. With interests in astronomy, math, physics, botany, and philosophy, Richardson took an unconventional route to establishing a science career. Richardson is a professor in biochemistry at Duke University.

== Biography ==
Richardson was born on January 25, 1941, and grew up in Teaneck, New Jersey. Her father was an electrical engineer and her mother was an English teacher. Her parents encouraged an interest in science and she was a member of local astronomy clubs as early as elementary school. She attended Teaneck High School and in 1958 won third place in the Westinghouse Science Talent Search, the most prestigious science fair in the United States, with calculations of the satellite Sputnik's orbit from her own observations.

She continued her education intending to study mathematics, astronomy and physics at Swarthmore College. However, Richardson instead graduated Phi Beta Kappa with a bachelor's degree in philosophy and a minor in physics in 1962 before she pursued graduate work in philosophy at Harvard University. Meanwhile, she was able to enroll in plant taxonomy and evolution courses at Harvard that would later contribute to her big-picture approach to studying protein structure. Since Harvard's philosophy focused on modern philosophy instead of Richardson's interest, classical philosophy, Richardson left with her master's degree from Harvard in 1966. Post-graduation, Richardson tried teaching high school, but soon realized that this career path was not for her. She subsequently rejoined the scientific world, working as a technician at Massachusetts Institute of Technology in the same laboratory as her husband, David Richardson, whom she met at Swarthmore College. At MIT, David Richardson was pursuing his doctorate in Al Cotton's lab using X-ray crystallography to study the structure of staphylococcal nuclease. Jane Richardson learned the necessary technical skills and scientific background in biochemistry and biophysics through work at the lab as she worked alongside her husband, whom she still works with today. Richardson later began drawing her eponymous diagrams as a method of interpreting the structures of protein molecules. Over the course of her career, Richardson has been recognized by many prestigious institutions of the scientific community. In July 1985 she was awarded a MacArthur Fellowship for her work in biochemistry. She was elected to the National Academy of Sciences and the American Academy of Arts and Sciences in 1991 and to the Institute of Medicine in 2006. As part of her role in the National Academy of Sciences, Richardson serves on panels that advise the White House and the Pentagon regarding nationally important scientific matters (e.g.,). For the 2012-2013 year, Richardson was elected president of the Biophysical Society for the 2012-2013 year, and she became a fellow of the American Crystallographic Association in 2012. Richardson is currently a James B. Duke Professor of Biochemistry at Duke University.

The Richardsons continue to jointly head a research group at Duke University.

Richardson is a contributor to Wikipedia, where she is a prominent member of WikiProject Biophysics.

== Scientific work and contributions ==
Richardson's first forays into science were in the field of astronomy. By observing the position of Sputnik – at the time, the only artificial satellite – on two successive nights, she managed to calculate its predicted orbit. She submitted her results to the Westinghouse Science Talent Search, winning third place in 1958.

Richardson joined her husband David C. Richardson, then completing his PhD work at MIT, in studying the 3-dimensional structure of the staphylococcal nuclease protein (1SNS) by X-ray crystallography for his doctoral thesis. Staphylococcal nuclease was among the first dozen protein structures solved. Classes in botany and evolution that she had taken while pursuing her degree shaped her thinking about the work she was doing in the chemistry laboratory. During her crystallographic studies, Jane Richardson had come to realize that a general classification scheme can be developed from the recurring structural motifs of the proteins. In the meantime, Jane and David Richardson had moved to Duke University in 1970, where they solved the first crystal structure of superoxide dismutase (2SOD). By 1977 she published her findings on protein relatedness in Nature, with a paper entitled "β-sheet topology and the relatedness of proteins".

As Richardson developed the ribbon diagram to illustrate her findings over the course of her taxonomic research, her iconic images first appeared in the review journal Advances in Protein Chemistry in an article titled "The anatomy and taxonomy of protein structure" 1981, an early hallmark publication in structural bioinformatics. The diagrams have since become a standard way of visualizing protein structure, specifically depicting beta-sheet topology and connections between amino acid sequences, or peptides, that make up proteins. The protein folding process involves four levels: primary structures, secondary structures, tertiary structures, and quaternary structures. Secondary structures result from hydrogen bond interactions between adjacent amino acids sequences to form alpha helices or beta-sheets. Tertiary structures are a higher order of protein folding that depict the conformation of and connectivity between alpha-helices and beta-sheets in 3D. Richardson's ribbon diagrams illustrate beta-sheet topology and connectivity in higher-order protein structures. She formalized general rules about beta-sheets linkage via "hairpin" connections or "crossover" connections. In a hairpin connection a peptide backbone stems out of and loops around to return to the same beta-sheet end from which it left. A crossover connection involves the peptide backbone extending out of one beta-sheet and looping around to enter another beta-sheet on the opposite end of the protein. Her initial drawings and continual discoveries contribute to a broader understanding of protein energetics and evolution. Peter Agre, Nobel laureate and fellow Duke professor, said of the Richardsons' work: "Jane and David’s work allowed us to reveal the form of proteins, and from there it was easier to understand their function".

The Richardsons' more recent work has diversified beyond classification and crystallography. In the 1980s they stretched into the fields of synthetic biochemistry and computational biology as pioneers in the de novo design of proteins, a reverse engineering approach to make and test theoretical predictions about protein folding. In the 1990s the Richardsons developed the kinemage system of molecular graphics and David Richardson wrote the Mage program to display them on small computers, for the then-new journal Protein Science. Additionally, they developed all-atom contact analysis (see image) to measure "goodness of fit" inside proteins and in interactions with surrounding molecules. The Kinemage website offers interactive exploration of various 3D protein structures through computer displays using their Mage or KiNG graphics programs. Funded by a National Institutes of Health (NIH) grant, the website is often used as a teaching tool. Textbooks and internet sites that have sourced images from Kinemages include Introduction to Protein Structure by Branden & Tooze, Fundamentals of Biochemistry by Viet, Voet & Pratt, Principles of Biochemistry by Horton et al., and the University of Mississippi's Kinemage Authorship Project.

The Richardson Laboratory currently studies structural motifs in RNA as well as proteins, as part of the RNA Ontology Consortium (ROC) to better communicate RNA structure and function research findings. The laboratory has acted as assessors in the CASP8 structure-prediction experiment (CASP), is one of the four developer teams on the PHENIX software system for x-ray crystallography of macromolecules, and hosts the MolProbity web service for validation and accuracy improvement of protein and RNA crystal structures. MolProbity uses the KiNG program (successor to Mage) for showing 3D kinemage graphics on-line. Jane Richardson serves on the worldwide Protein Data Bank (wwPDB) X-ray Validation Task Force and NMR Validation Task Force. As she continues to run the Richardson laboratory alongside her husband at Duke, where they use MolProbity to validate RNA, protein, crystal structures, she also adds science-related images, images of nature, and pictures for the WikiProject Biophysics to Wikimedia Commons.

== Awards and honors ==
- 1958: Third place in the Westinghouse Science Talent Search (currently called the International Science and Engineering Fair), a prestigious nationwide science fair
- 1985: MacArthur Fellowship, also called the "Genius Grant" awarded to individuals who have "shown extraordinary originality and dedication in their creative pursuits and marked capacity for self-direction"
- 1991: Election to National Academy of Science, an honor that recognizes exceptional previous and continual original research
- 2006: Election to the National Academy of Medicine in Washington, D.C., a nonprofit institution that strives to offer objective science, technology, and health advice
- 2012: American Crystallographic Association fellow in 2012 for fulfilling the following criteria: "a Member whose efforts on behalf of the advancement of crystallography or its applications that are scientifically or socially distinguished"
- 2012 - 2013: President of the Biophysical society
- 2019: Alexander Hollaender Award in Biophysics, an award of distinguished biophysics contributions

== Notable publications ==
The following articles are classified as highly cited in field by Web of Science as of February 17, 2020:

- Davis IW, Leaver-Fay A, Chen VB, Block JN, Kapral GJ, Wang X, Murray LW, Arendall WB, Snoeyink J, Richardson JS, Richardson DC (2007). "MolProbity: All-Atom Contacts and Structure Validation for Proteins and Nucleic Acids". Nucleic Acids Research. 35 (Web Server issue): W375–83. doi:10.1093/nar/gkm216. PMC 1933162. PMID 17452350.
- Adams PD, Afonine PV, Bunkóczi G, Chen VB, Davis IW, Echols N, Headd JJ, Hung LW, Kapral GJ, Grosse-Kunstleve RW, McCoy AJ, Moriarty NW, Oeffner R, Read RJ, Richardson DC, Richardson JS, Terwilliger TC, Zwart PH (February 2010). "PHENIX: a comprehensive Python-based system for macromolecular structure solution". Acta Crystallographica. Section D, Biological Crystallography. 66 (Pt 2): 213–21. Bibcode:2010AcCrD..66..213A. doi:10.1107/S0907444909052925. PMC 2815670. PMID 20124702.
- Chen VB, Arendall WB, Headd JJ, Keedy DA, Immormino RM, Kapral GJ, Murray LW, Richardson JS, Richardson DC (2010). "MolProbity: all-atom contacts and structure validation for proteins and nucleic acids". Acta Crystallogr D. 66 (1): 12–21. doi:10.1107/S0907444909042073. PMC 2803126. PMID 20057044.
- Adams PD, Afonine PV, Bunkóczi G, Chen VB, Echols N, Headd JJ, Hung LW, Jain S, Kapral GJ, Grosse Kunstleve RW, McCoy AJ, Moriarty NW, Oeffner RD, Read RJ, Richardson DC, Richardson JS, Terwilliger TC, Zwart PH (September 2011). "The Phenix software for automated determination of macromolecular structures". Methods. 55 (1): 94–106. doi:10.1016/j.ymeth.2011.07.005. PMC 3193589. PMID 21821126.
- Dunkle JA, Wang L, Feldman MB, Pulk A, Chen VB, Kapral GJ, Noeske J, Richardson JS, Blanchard SC, Cate JH (May 2011). "Structures of the bacterial ribosome in classical and hybrid states of tRNA binding". Science. 332 (6032): 981–4. Bibcode:2011Sci...332..981D. doi:10.1126/science.1202692. PMC 3176341. PMID 21596992.
- Williams CJ, Headd JJ, Moriarty NW, Prisant MG, Videau LL, Deis LN, Verma V, Keedy DA, Hintze BJ, Chen VB, Jain S, Lewis SM, Arendall WB, Snoeyink J, Adams PD, Lovell SC, Richardson JS, Richardson DC (January 2018). "MolProbity: More and better reference data for improved all-atom structure validation". Protein Science. 27 (1): 293–315. doi:10.1002/pro.3330. PMC 5734394. PMID 29067766.
