= Alexander Hollaender =

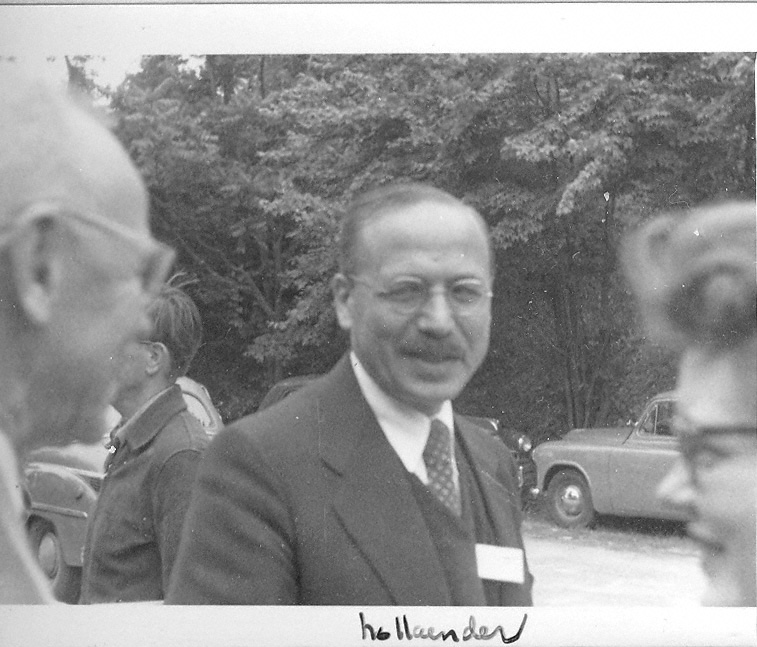
- Alexander Hollaender at Cold Spring Harbor Symposium, c. 1950's Photograph by Esther Lederberg
- Born: December 9, 1898; Samter, Province of Posen, German Empire
- Died: December 6, 1986 (aged 87); Washington D.C.
- Known for: Radiation-induced mutations
- Awards: Enrico Fermi Award (1983); Member, National Academy of Sciences (1957)
- Scientific career
- Workplaces: Cold Spring Harbor Laboratory

Alexander Hollaender (9 December 1898 – 6 December 1986) was a leading researcher in radiation biology and in genetic mutations. In 1983 he was given the Enrico Fermi Award by the United States Department of Energy for his contributions in founding the science of radiation biology, and for his leadership in promoting "scientific exchanges" between American scientists and scientists from developing countries.

Hollaender was born in Samter, German Empire (Szamotuły, Poland), he emigrated to the US in 1921. In 1939 Hollaender published research showing that the mutations of spores of the ringworm fungus occurred in the same spectrum as the absorption spectrum of nucleic acids indicating that nucleic acids form the building blocks of genes. A young Esther M. Zimmer, who worked with Dr. Hollaender at the U. S. Public Health Service (Bethesda, MD), published with Dr. Hollaender, Eva Sansome and Milislav Demerec in this very early field of x-ray- and UV-induced mutations. In later years, Esther Zimmer (subsequentlyEsther Lederberg) became one of the most influential founders of bacterial and bacteriophage (Lambda phage) genetics. From 1946 to 1966 Hollaender was the director of the Biology Division at Oak Ridge National Laboratories, where he worked with M. Laurance Morse, who himself was a collaborator with Esther Lederberg.

In 1957, Hollaender was elected to the National Academy of Sciences, in recognition of his work on radiation biology.director of the Biology Division

His research was not appreciated for its discovery at the time, and later scientists reports were necessary before science accepted the role of nucleic acids as the genetic material. Historians of science now realize his early discovery, and his Fermi Award recognized this discovery.

In 1981 Hollaender established the Council for Research Planning in Biological Sciences, and was its president at the time of his death from a pulmonary embolism in 1986. The US National Academy of Sciences gives the Alexander Hollaender Award in Biophysics every three years in his honor.
