= King-Wai Yau =

Chinese-American neuroscientist

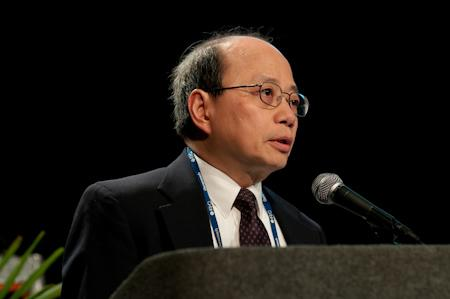
- King-Wai Yau delivering 2008 Champalimaud Award lecture at ARVO meeting
- Born: October 27, 1948 (age 77); Guangzhou (Canton), China
- Citizenship: USA
- Education: Princeton A.B. in physics 1971, Harvard Ph.D in neurobiology 1975
- Known for: mechanisms of sensory transduction in vision and olfaction
- Scientific career
- Fields: Neuroscience, Biophysics
- Workplaces: Johns Hopkins University, University of Texas Medical Branch
- Academic advisors: John G. Nicholls, Denis A. Baylor, Alan L. Hodgkin
- Website: neuroscience.jhu.edu/KingWaiYau.php

King-Wai Yau (Chinese: 游景威; Jyutping: jau4 ging2 wai1; pinyin: Yóu Jǐngwēi; born October 27, 1948) is a Chinese-born American neuroscientist and Professor of Neuroscience at Johns Hopkins University School of Medicine in Baltimore, Maryland.

== Biography ==
Born in Guangzhou (formerly called Canton), Guangdong, China, he was the sixth of seven children. His family relocated to Hong Kong within months of his birth. His father, a businessman, died when Yau was only five years old.

He attended secondary school in Buddhist Wong Fung Ling College and St. Paul's Co-educational College in Hong Kong, before entering University of Hong Kong Faculty of Medicine to study medicine. Not wanting to be a physician, however, he departed for the United States in 1968 after only one year of medical study. He received an A.B. in physics (University Scholar; Phi Beta Kappa) from Princeton in 1971 and a Ph.D. in neurobiology from Harvard in 1975, completing his doctoral thesis under John G. Nicholls, a former student of Bernard Katz. He did postdoctoral work with Denis A. Baylor at Stanford University, then with Sir Alan L. Hodgkin at University of Cambridge, United Kingdom. Thereafter, he was on the faculty of University of Texas Medical Branch at Galveston (1981–86), rising to Professor of Physiology and Biophysics in 1985. In 1986, he became Professor of Neuroscience and Investigator of Howard Hughes Medical Institute (1986-2004) at Johns Hopkins University School of Medicine, where he has been since.

== Scientific contributions ==
He is known for discoveries on how light and odor are sensed in the eye and the nose, triggering neural signals to be transmitted to the brain. He has greatly elucidated the properties of the light responses and their underlying phototransduction mechanisms in retinal rods and cones, as well as in intrinsically-photosensitive retinal ganglion cells which express the photopigment, melanopsin, to mediate mostly non-image vision such as pupillary light reflex and photoentrainment of the circadian rhythm. He has made similarly important discoveries on olfactory transduction in the receptor neurons of the nasal olfactory epithelium. His work impacts broadly on understanding G-protein signaling at a quantitative level. His investigations on the spontaneous activity of rod and cone pigments have provided a physicochemical explanation for why our vision does not extend into Infrared wavelengths.

He is a Member of the National Academy of Sciences and the National Academy of Medicine, and a Fellow of the American Academy of Arts and Sciences, as well as a Member of Academia Sinica, Taiwan.

== Selected honors & awards ==
- 1978, Alfred P. Sloan Foundation Fellow
- 1980, Visiting Fellow, Trinity College, Cambridge, United Kingdom
- 1980, Rank Prize in Optoelectronics, The Rank Prize Funds, United Kingdom
- 1993, Friedenwald Award, Association for Research in Vision and Ophthalmology (ARVO)
- 1994, Alcon Award in Vision Research, Alcon Research Institute
- 1995, Fellow, American Academy of Arts and Sciences
- 1996, Magnes Prize, Hebrew University of Jerusalem
- 2004, Teacher of the Year, Johns Hopkins University School of Medicine
- 2005, Alcon Award in Vision Research (second time), Alcon Research Institute
- 2006, Balazs Prize, International Society for Eye Research (ISER)
- 2008, António Champalimaud Vision Award, The Champalimaud Foundation, Portugal
- 2010, Member, National Academy of Sciences
- 2012, CNIB Chanchlani Global Vision Research Award, Canada
- 2013, Alexander Hollaender Award in Biophysics, National Academy of Sciences
- 2016, RRF Paul Kayser International Award for Retinal Research (ISER)
- 2017, Daniel Nathans Scientific Innovator Award, Johns Hopkins University School of Medicine
- 2018, Member, National Academy of Medicine
- 2019, Helen Keller Prize for Vision Research, Helen Keller Foundation & BrightFocus Foundation
- 2019, Beckman-Argyros Vision Award, Arnold & Mabel Beckman Foundation
- 2022, Member, Academia Sinica, Taiwan
- 2026, Joram Piatigorsky Lecture and Award, National Eye Institute, NIH

== Highly-Cited Papers ==
Articles with over 500 citations according to Google Scholar as of May 6, 2017:

- 1979 "The membrane current of single rod outer segments", 607 citations
- 1979 "Responses of retinal rods to single photons", 819 citations
- 1989 "Cyclic GMP-activated conductance of retinal photoreceptor cells", 590 citations
- 1990 "Primary structure and functional expression of a cyclic nucleotide-activated channel from olfactory neurons", 672 citations
- 1998 "Identification of ligands for olfactory receptors by functional expression of a receptor library", 534 citations
- 2002 "Melanopsin-containing retinal ganglion cells: architecture, projections, and intrinsic photosensitivity", 1579 citations
- 2003 "Melanopsin and rod–cone photoreceptive systems account for all major accessory visual functions in mice", 838 citations
- 2003 "Diminished pupillary light reflex at high irradiances in melanopsin-knockout mice", 608 citations
- 2005 "Melanopsin-expressing ganglion cells in primate retina signal colour and irradiance and project to the LGN", 798 citations
- 2006 "Central projections of melanopsin‐expressing retinal ganglion cells in the mouse", 518 citations
