= David J. DeRosier =

American biophysicist (born 1939)

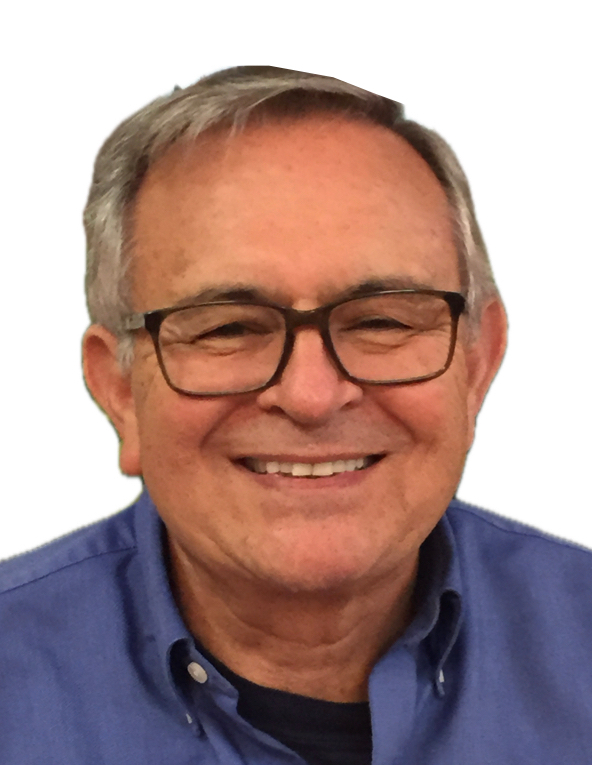
- Born: February 22, 1939 (age 87); Milwaukee, Wisconsin, U.S.
- Education: University of Chicago
- Known for: Three-dimensional reconstruction from electron micrographs
- Awards: Alexander Hollaender Award in Biophysics (2001), Elisabeth Roberts Cole Award, member of the National Academy of Sciences, member of the American Academy of Arts and Sciences
- Scientific career
- Fields: Biophysics, structural biology, electron microscopy
- Workplaces: University of Texas at Austin, Brandeis University

David J. DeRosier is an American biophysicist known for developing methods to reconstruct three-dimensional structures from electron micrographs. Working with Aaron Klug in the late 1960s, he produced the first three-dimensional reconstruction from electron microscope images, using the tail of a bacteriophage as the test structure. This work laid the groundwork for techniques used decades later in cryo-electron microscopy and cryo-electron tomography. DeRosier spent most of his career at Brandeis University, where he studied the structure of bacterial flagella, actin filaments, and related cytoskeletal assemblies. He is a member of the National Academy of Sciences, the American Academy of Arts and Sciences, and a fellow of several scientific societies.

== Early life and education ==
DeRosier was born on February 22, 1939, in Milwaukee, Wisconsin. He attended Shorewood High School in Shorewood, Wisconsin. He earned a Bachelor of Science degree in physics from the University of Chicago in 1961. He remained at Chicago for graduate study and received a PhD in biophysics in 1965, working under the mentorship of Robert Haselkorn.

From 1965 to 1969, DeRosier carried out postdoctoral research with Aaron Klug at the Medical Research Council Laboratory of Molecular Biology in Cambridge, England. During this period, he and Klug introduced three-dimensional reconstruction from electron micrographs and applied the method to generate three-dimensional maps from micrographs of the negatively stained T4 bacteriophage tail. Together with Tony Crowther, Linda Amos, and John Finch, DeRosier and Klug went on to produce three-dimensional maps of human wart virus and tomato bushy stunt virus. These are generally regarded as the first single-particle reconstructions made from electron micrographs.

With Peter B. Moore, DeRosier developed the first set of computer programs able to calculate Fourier transforms of digitized micrographs, extract helical layer line data, and generate three-dimensional maps from that data. DeRosier and Moore, together with Hugh Huxley, used these programs to generate three-dimensional maps of actin filaments with bound tropomyosin and the S1 fragment of myosin.

== Career ==
In 1969, DeRosier joined the Department of Chemistry at the University of Texas at Austin, where he was promoted to associate professor in 1972. In 1973, he joined the Structural Biology Laboratory in the Rosenstiel Basic Medical Sciences Research Center and the Department of Physics at Brandeis University, where he was promoted to full professor in 1978. On arriving at Brandeis, he joined Donald Caspar, Carolyn Cohen, and Susan Lowey in the newly formed Structural Biology Laboratory. In 1979, he moved from the Department of Physics to the Department of Biology at Brandeis, where he remained until his retirement in 2005. He held the Abraham S. and Gertrude Burg Chair in Life Sciences. He served as Chairman of the Science Council at Brandeis from 1983 to 1984 and as Chairman of the Department of Biology from 1984 to 1987. From 1996 to 2009, he was Director of the W. M. Keck Institute for Cellular Visualization.

At Brandeis, DeRosier worked on two main projects. With collaborator Robert Macnab at Yale University, he studied the bacterial flagellum, examining the structure of the flagellar hook and rotor and proposing models for how these components function as part of the flagellar motor. With collaborator Lewis Tilney at the University of Pennsylvania, he studied the actin cytoskeleton, including the organization of actin filaments in stereocilia, the sensory structures found in cochlear hair cells, and in curved bristle structures in Drosophila.

DeRosier retired from Brandeis in 2005 and became professor emeritus. He continued research afterward, working with colleague Gina Turrigiano on super-resolution light microscopy. Between 2015 and 2019, he took on a role as visiting scientist in the laboratories of Dorit Hanein and Niels Volkmann in San Diego, California, where he worked on combining cryo-fluorescence microscopy with cryo-electron microscopy and image analysis. In 2022, DeRosier spoke at a symposium held at the Medical Research Council Laboratory of Molecular Biology honoring the life and work of Aaron Klug, in a talk titled "A 3D ending to a 2D beginning."

== Research contributions ==
The reconstruction method DeRosier developed with Klug took advantage of the helical symmetry present in many biological structures. By combining information from a single electron micrograph of a helical specimen, the method could recover three-dimensional structural information without needing multiple views of the particle. This approach was later described by other researchers as the starting point for three-dimensional electron microscopy as a field, predating the single-particle methods introduced later by Joachim Frank and others.

Beyond the original reconstruction method, DeRosier's laboratory contributed structural studies of several cytoskeletal and motility-related systems, including F-actin, microtubules, and the bacterial chemotaxis signaling complex.

In a 2024 public lecture at the University of Cape Town, Nobel laureate Joachim Frank credited Klug and DeRosier with having turned electron microscopy into an entirely new field of study.

== Awards and honors ==
DeRosier has received the following recognitions.

- Career Development Award, National Institutes of Health (1969 to 1972)
- Guggenheim Fellow (1987 to 1988)
- Elisabeth Roberts Cole Award, Biophysical Society (1993)
- MERIT Award, National Institutes of Health (1990 to 2000)
- Miller Visiting Professor, University of California, Berkeley (2000)
- Alexander Hollaender Award in Biophysics, National Academy of Sciences (2001), awarded for his development of three-dimensional image reconstruction methods and his analytical visualization of cellular motility mechanisms
- Distinguished Service Award, University of Chicago Alumni Association (2006)
- Distinguished Scientist Award, Microscopy Society of America (2013)

He is a fellow of the Biophysical Society, the American Academy of Microbiology, and the American Association for the Advancement of Science. He is also a member of the American Academy of Arts and Sciences and the National Academy of Sciences.

== Selected publications ==
- De Rosier, D. J. and Klug, A. (1968). Reconstruction of three dimensional structures from electron micrographs. Nature, 217, 130 to 134.
- Crowther, R. A., Amos, L. A., Finch, J. T., De Rosier, D. J., and Klug, A. (1970). Three dimensional reconstructions of spherical viruses by Fourier synthesis from electron micrographs. Nature, 226, 421 to 425.
- DeRosier, D. J. and Moore, P. B. (1970). Reconstruction of three dimensional images from electron micrographs of structures with helical symmetry. Journal of Molecular Biology, 52, 355 to 369.
- DeRosier, D. J., Oliver, R. M., and Reed, L. J. (1971). Crystallization and preliminary structural analysis of dihydrolipoyl transsuccinylase, the core of the 2-oxoglutarate dehydrogenase complex. Proceedings of the National Academy of Sciences, 68, 1135 to 1137.
- Kihara, M., Francis, N. R., DeRosier, D. J., and Macnab, R. M. (1996). Analysis of a FliM-FliN flagellar switch fusion mutant of Salmonella typhimurium. Journal of Bacteriology, 178, 4582 to 4589.
- Tilney, L. G. and DeRosier, D. J. (2006). How to make a curved Drosophila bristle using straight actin bundles. Proceedings of the National Academy of Sciences, 102, 18785 to 18792.
