= Ruth E. Ley =

British-American microbial ecologist

- Born: England, UK
- Occupations: Director of the Department of Microbiome Science at the Max Planck Institute for Biology, Tübingen, Germany.
- Known for: The ecology and evolutionary history of the human gut microbiome.

Academic background
- Education: BA, Integrative Biology, 1992, University of California, Berkeley; PhD, 2001, University of Colorado, Boulder

Academic work
- Institutions: Max Planck Institute; Cornell University; Washington University in St. Louis
- Website: leylab.com

Ruth E. Ley is a British & American microbial ecologist. She is currently director of the Department of Microbiome Science at the Max Planck Institute for Biology, Tübingen, Germany.

== Early life and education ==
Ley completed her Bachelor of Arts degree in Integrative Biology at the University of California, Berkeley and her PhD at the University of Colorado Boulder. She worked as a NASA-NRC Post Doctoral Research Fellow with Norman R. Pace on the phylogenetic diversity of the Guerrero Negro hypersaline microbial mats. In 2004, she moved to Washington University School of Medicine to work with Jeffrey I. Gordon on the mammalian gut microbiome within the contexts of human obesity and mammalian evolution.

== Career ==
She was named an Instructor at Washington University School of Medicine in 2005 and Research Assistant Professor two years later. Ley joined the faculty of the Department of Microbiology at Cornell University in Ithaca, New York, in 2008, as an Assistant Professor. She was promoted to Associate Professor with tenure in 2013, and was jointly appointed to the Department of Molecular Biology and Genetics at Cornell. While at Cornell University, in 2009 she was named a Beckman Young Investigator (Arnold and Mabel Beckman Foundation); in 2010 she was the recipient of the Packard Fellowship in Science and Engineering from the David and Lucile Packard Foundation; she received a National Institutes of Health Director's New Innovator Award in 2010; and in 2014 the Young Investigator Award from the International Society for Microbial Ecology.

Ley was appointed a Scientific Member of the Max Planck Society, and Director of the Department of Microbiome Science at the Max Planck Institute for Biology in 2016. At the MPI for Biology, she continues to work on the evolutionary origins of the human gut microbiome. Ley's research program looks into the host adaptations and physiological impacts of these human symbionts, and has shown that they encode "silent flagellins", which can bind host TLR5 without causing a pro-inflammatory response, due to the lack of a previously uncharacterised allosteric binging site

Since joining the Max Planck Society, Ley has been the recipient of the 2020 Otto Bayer Award and the Jung Prize for Medicine. She was also elected a Fellow of the German National Academy of Sciences Leopoldina, European Molecular Biology Organization, and the American Academy of Microbiology. She was elected a Fellow of the Royal Society in 2026.
