= Ralf J. Sommer =

German biologist

Ralf Josef Sommer (born 23 September 1963) is a German biologist specializing in evolutionary developmental biology.

== Scientific career ==
Sommer studied biology at the RWTH Aachen University, at the University of Tübingen and at LMU Munich where he obtained his Diplom degree in 1989 and obtained his Ph.D. in the lab of Diethard Tautz on a study of the evolution of segmentation genes in insects in 1992. His work was one of the first molecular studies in the field of evolutionary developmental biology (evo-devo in short), a discipline that started its revival in the late 1980s and early 1990s. From 1993 to 1995, he was a research fellow at the California Institute of Technology in Pasadena. Since 1999, he has been director of the department for evolutionary biology at the Max Planck Institute for Developmental Biology in Tübingen, Germany and was appointed Adjunct Professor (Honorarprofessor) at the University of Tübingen in 2002. He is awardee of the FALCON Prize of the German Society for Cell Biology and was head co-organizer of the 19th International C. elegans Conference, UCLA, USA in 2013. In 2015, he was elected as an EMBO member.

== Professional contributions ==
Ralf Sommer works in the field of evolutionary developmental biology on nematodes. He has developed and established the nematode Pristionchus pacificus as a model system for integrative studies in evolutionary biology. Described in 1996 as a new species by Sommer and co-workers, P. pacificus has grown as an important model system, in which laboratory studies that aim for a mechanistic understanding of evolution can be combined with fieldwork. The latter allows ecological and population genetic studies to complement the gene-centered and development-centered perspectives of evo-devo.

The original work of Sommer´s research focused on the evolution of developmental processes showing that homologous structures can be generated by distinct molecular mechanisms, a phenomenon now known as developmental systems drift. More recent work incorporates many additional areas of evolutionary biology. The nematode P. pacificus is associated with scarab beetles, an observation that provides an ecological framework and represents one of the cornerstones of his current research. Similarly, a population genetic framework for P. pacificus research has been established with the identification and exploration of La Réunion Island in the Indian Ocean, where this nematode shows an extraordinary genetic diversity. P. pacificus work on La Réunion Island is supported by a field station at the local Insectarium in Le Port. The integrative research program on P. pacificus represents a major paradigm shift for studying phenotypic evolution, by simultaneously investigating in one organism, the same patterns and processes from independent evolutionary perspectives.

Consequently, the most recent studies investigate the evolution of novelty, focusing on developmental (phenotypic) plasticity as a facilitator of biological diversity. Specifically, the combination of laboratory studies with fieldwork allows new insight into the molecular mechanisms of developmental plasticity.
