= Cryogenic electron tomography =

Three-dimensional imaging technique

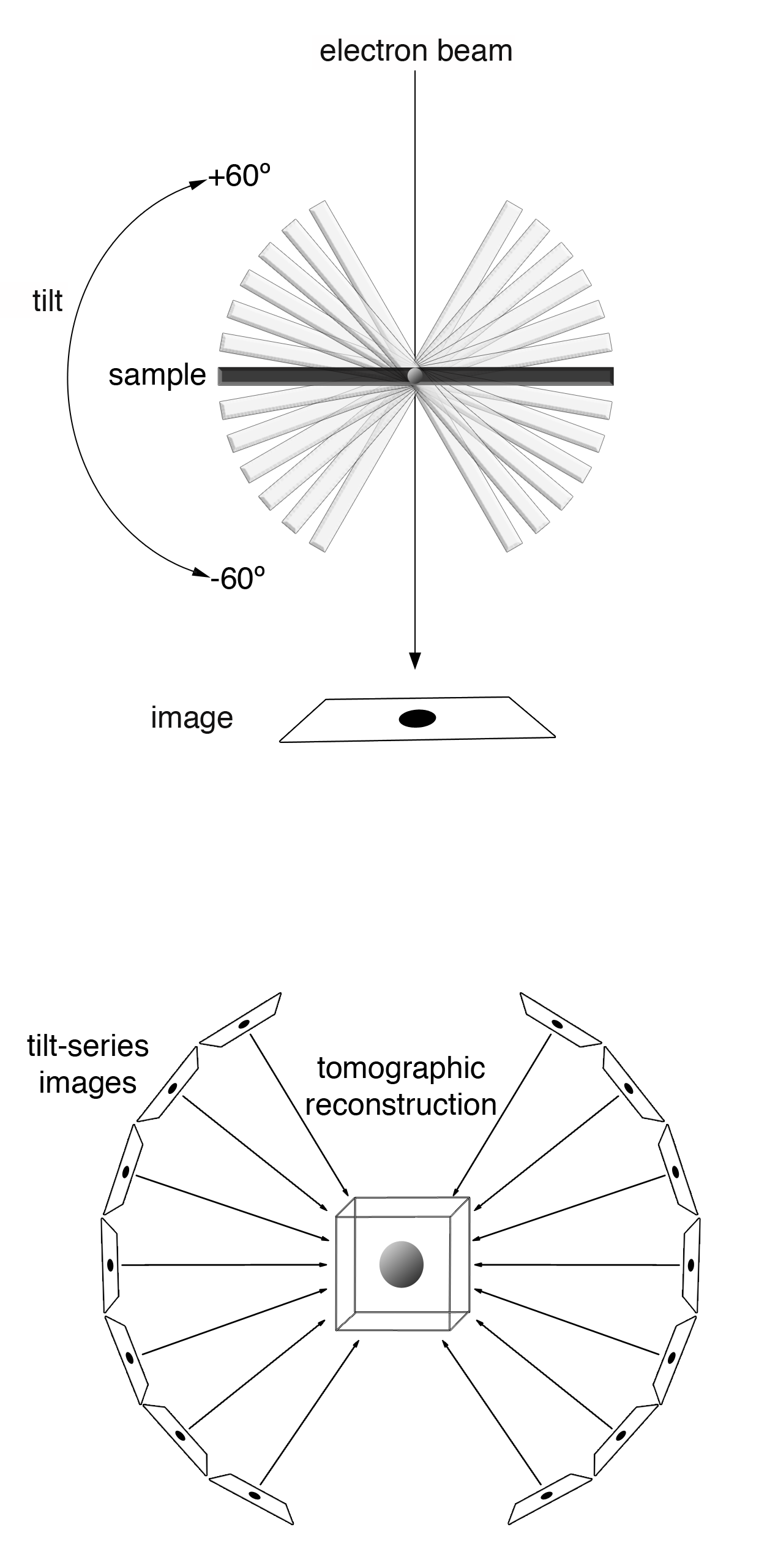
This schematic shows the concept of electron tomography. A sample is imaged in a TEM as it is tilted to different angles, resulting in a "tilt-series" of 2D images (top). This tilt-series is then computationally reconstructed into a 3D "tomogram" (bottom).

Cryogenic electron tomography (cryoET) is an imaging technique used to reconstruct high-resolution (~1–4 nm) three-dimensional volumes of samples, often (but not limited to) biological macromolecules and cells. cryoET is a specialized application of transmission electron cryomicroscopy (CryoTEM) in which samples are imaged as they are tilted, resulting in a series of 2D images that can be combined to produce a 3D reconstruction, similar to a CT scan of the human body. In contrast to other electron tomography techniques, samples are imaged under cryogenic conditions (< −150 °C). For cellular material, the structure is immobilized in non-crystalline, vitreous ice, allowing them to be imaged without dehydration or chemical fixation, which would otherwise disrupt or distort biological structures.

== Description of technique ==
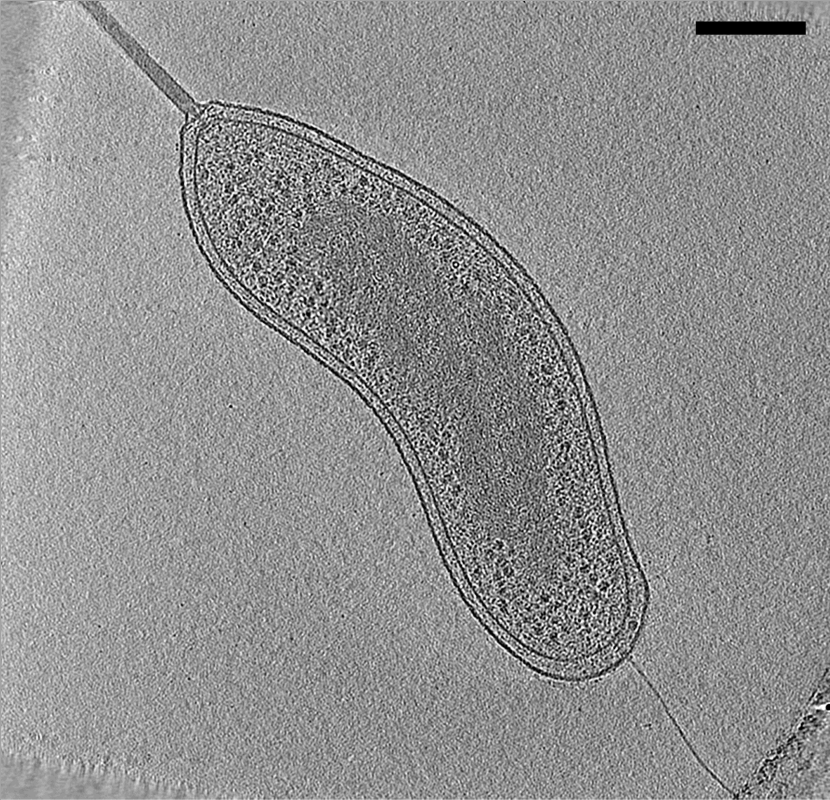
Central slice through a tomogram of an intact Bdellovibrio bacteriovorus cell. Scale bar 200 nm.

In electron microscopy (EM), samples are imaged in a high vacuum. Such a vacuum is incompatible with biological samples such as cells; the water would boil off, and the difference in pressure would explode the cell. In room-temperature EM techniques, samples are therefore prepared by fixation and dehydration. Another approach to stabilize biological samples, however, is to freeze them (cryo-electron microscopy or cryoEM). As in other electron cryomicroscopy techniques, samples for cryoET (typically small cells such as Bacteria, Archaea, or viruses) are prepared in standard aqueous media and applied to an EM grid. The grid is then plunged into a cryogen, for example liquid ethane, with sufficiently large specific heat that the rate of cooling is rapid enough that water molecules do not have time to rearrange into a crystalline lattice. The resulting water state is called low-density amorphous ice, or commonly "vitreous ice" for its glass-like nature. This form of ice preserves native cellular structures, such as lipid membranes, that would normally be disrupted by hexagonal or other ordered ice upon slower freezing. Plunge-frozen samples are subsequently kept at liquid-nitrogen temperatures through storage and imaging so that the water never warms enough to crystallize.

Samples are imaged in a transmission electron microscope (TEM). As in other electron tomography techniques, the sample is tilted to different angles relative to the electron beam (typically every 2-3 degrees from about −60° to +60°), and an image is acquired at each angle. This tilt-series of images can then be computationally reconstructed into a three-dimensional view of the object of interest. This is called a tomogram, or tomographic reconstruction.

=== Potential for high-resolution in situ imaging ===
One of the most commonly cited benefits of cryoET is the ability to reconstruct 3D volumes of individual objects (proteins, cells, etc.) rather than necessitating multiple copies of the sample in crystallographic methods or in other cryoEM imaging methods like single particle analysis. CryoET is considered to be an in situ method when used on an unperturbed cell or other system since plunge-freezing of sufficiently thin samples fixes the specimen in place fast enough to cause minimal changes to atomic positioning. Thick samples, greater than ~500 nm, require additional conditions like high-pressure to promote vitrification throughout the sample.

== Considerations ==
=== Sample thickness ===
In transmission electron microscopy (TEM), because electrons interact strongly with matter, samples must be kept very thin to not cause samples to darken due to multiple elastic scattering events. Therefore, in cryoET, samples are generally less than ~500 nm thick. For this reason, most cryoET studies have focused on purified macromolecular complexes, viruses, or small cells such as those of many species of Bacteria and Archaea. For example, cryoET has been used to understand encapsulation of 12 nm size protein cage nanoparticles inside 60 nm sized virus-like nanoparticles.

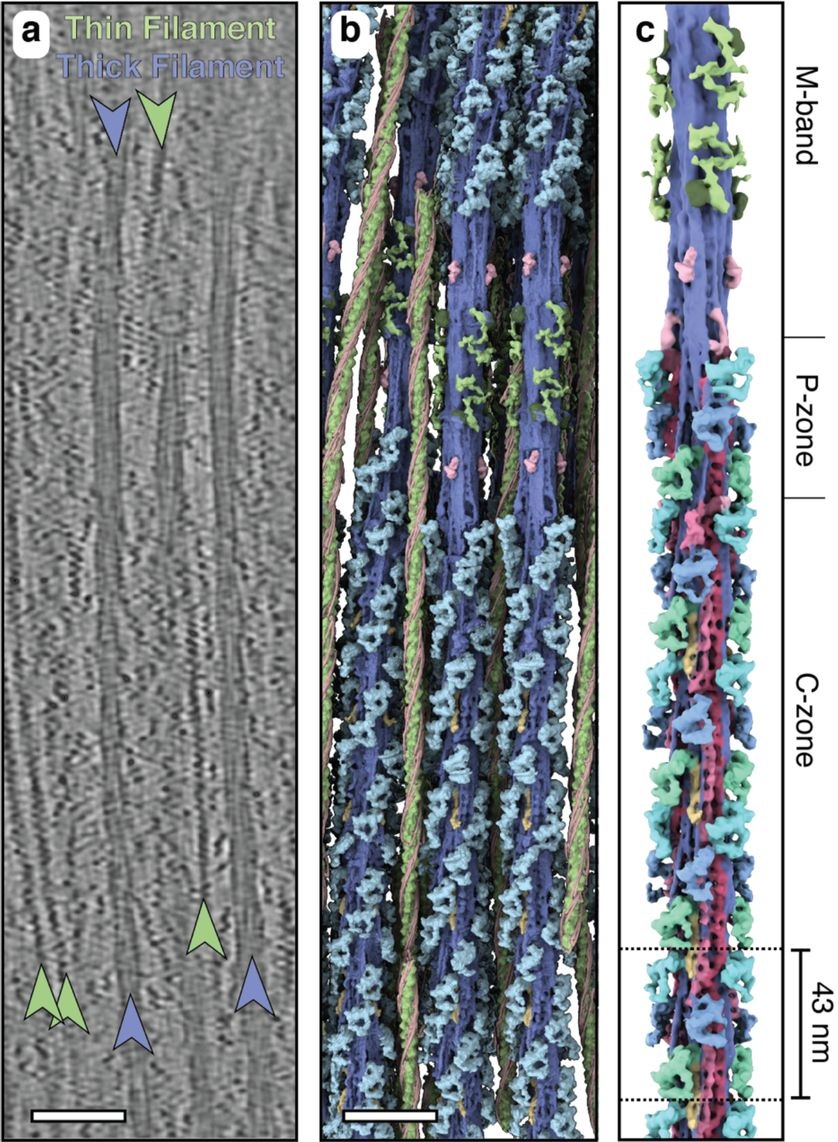
(a) Tomographic slice of a cardiac sarcomere. Scale bar, 50 nm. (b) Reconstructed filaments mapped into a tomogram. Scale bar, 50 nm (c) Structure of the thick filament from the M-band to the C-zone.

Larger cells, and even tissues, can be prepared for cryoET by thinning, either by cryo-sectioning or by focused ion beam (FIB) milling. In cryo-sectioning, frozen blocks of cells or tissue are sectioned into thin samples with a cryo-microtome. In FIB-milling, plunge-frozen samples are exposed to a focused beam of ions, typically gallium, that precisely whittle away material from the top and bottom of a sample, leaving a thin lamella suitable for cryoET imaging.

=== Signal-to-noise ratio ===
For structures that are present in multiple copies in one or multiple tomograms, higher resolution (even ≤1 nm) can be obtained by subtomogram averaging. Similar to single particle analysis, subtomogram averaging computationally combines images of identical objects to increase the signal-to-noise ratio.

== Limitations ==
=== Radiation damage ===
Electron microscopy is known to swiftly decay biological samples compared to samples in materials science and physics due to radiation damage. In most other electron microscopy-based methods for imaging biological samples, combining the signal from many different sample copies has been the general way of surpassing this problem (e.g. crystallography, single particle analysis). In cryoET, instead of taking many images of different sample copies, many images are taken of one area. Consequentially, the fluence (number of electrons imparted per unit area) on the sample is around 2-5x more than in single particle analysis. Tomography on materials much more resilient allows drastically higher resolution than typical biological imaging, suggesting that radiation damage is the greatest limitation to cryoET of biological samples.

=== Depth resolution ===
The strong interaction of electrons with matter also results in an anisotropic resolution effect. As the sample is tilted during imaging, the electron beam interacts with a thicker apparent sample along the optical axis of the microscope at higher tilt angles. In practice, tilt angles greater than approximately 60–70° do not yield much information and are therefore not used. This results in a "missing wedge" of information in the final tomogram that decreases resolution parallel to the electron beam.

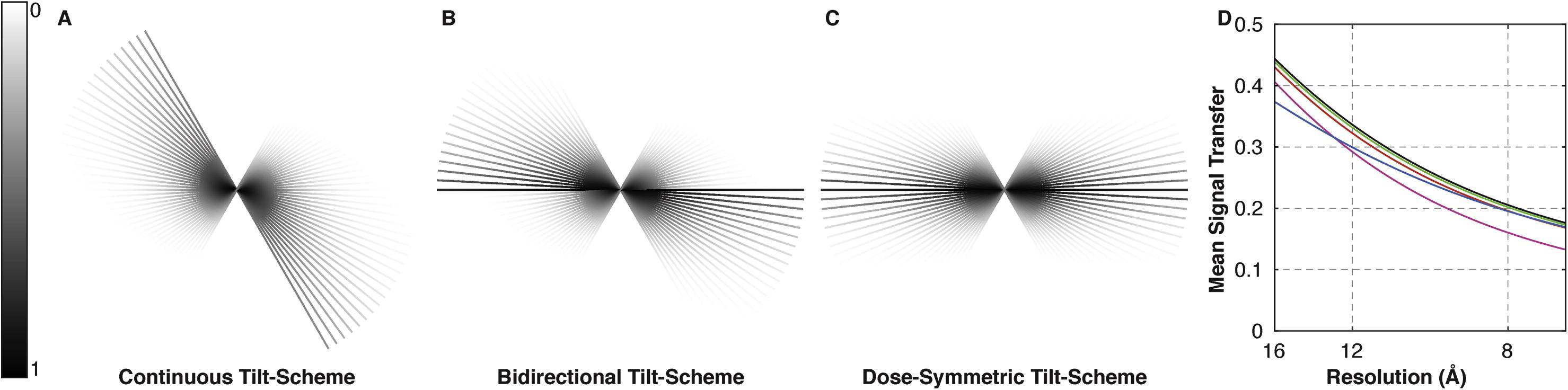
Schematic showing information transfer for various tilt schemes. Tilts are shown from −60° to +60° in 3° increments for 41 total tilts. Grey values correspond to the information transfer at each tilt according to the color map shown on the left. Reduction in information transfer is attributed to higher tilts having increased apparent thickness of the sample and accumulated radiation damage throughout the collection scheme.

The term "missing wedge" originates from the view of the Fourier transform of the tomogram, where an empty wedge is apparent due to not tilting the sample to 90°. The missing wedge results in a lack of resolution in sample depth, as the missing information is mostly along the z-axis. The missing wedge is also a problem in 3D electron crystallography, where it is usually solved by merging multiple datasets that overlap each other or through symmetry expansion where possible. Both of these solutions are due to the nature of crystallography, and so neither can be applied to tomography.

=== Segmentation ===
A major obstacle in cryoET is identifying structures of interest within complicated cellular environments. Solutions such as correlated cryo-fluorescence light microscopy, and super-resolution light microscopy (e.g. cryo-PALM) can be integrated with cryoET. In these techniques, a sample containing a fluorescently-tagged protein of interest is plunge-frozen and first imaged in a light microscope equipped with a special stage to allow the sample to be kept at sub-crystallization temperatures (< −150 °C). The location of the fluorescent signal is identified and the sample is transferred to the CryoTEM, where the same location is then imaged at high resolution by cryoET.

== See also ==
- Electron microscopy
- Electron tomography
- Cryogenic electron microscopy
- Transmission electron microscopy
