= List of members of the National Academy of Sciences (biophysics and computational biology) =

This list is a subsection of the List of members of the National Academy of Sciences, which includes members and international members of the United States National Academy of Sciences, living and deceased, each affiliated with one of the academy's disciplinary sections. Members are listed under their primary section, and each entry gives the person's name, primary institution, and election year. For deceased members, the year of death is noted.

| Name | Institution | Year |
|---|---|---|
| David A. Agard | University of California, San Francisco | 2007 |
| Ivet Bahar | Stony Brook University | 2020 |
| David Baker | University of Washington | 2006 |
| Robert L. Baldwin (died 2021) | Stanford University | 1980 |
| Nenad Ban | ETH Zurich | 2021 |
| Wolfgang P. Baumeister | Max Planck Institute of Biochemistry | 2010 |
| Adriaan Bax | National Institutes of Health | 2002 |
| Helmut Beinert (died 2007) | University of Wisconsin–Madison | 1980 |
| Howard Berg (died 2021) | Harvard University | 1984 |
| Helen M. Berman | Rutgers University | 2023 |
| Steven M. Block | Stanford University | 2007 |
| Olga Boudker | Weill Cornell Medical College | 2022 |
| Daniel Branton | Harvard University | 1981 |
| Axel Brunger | Stanford University | 2005 |
| Carlos Bustamante | University of California, Berkeley | 2002 |
| Charles R. Cantor | Boston University | 1988 |
| David A. Case | Rutgers University | 2025 |
| Donald L. D. Caspar (died 2021) | Florida State University | 1994 |
| Jue Chen | Rockefeller University | 2019 |
| Yifan Cheng | University of California, San Francisco | 2020 |
| Wah Chiu | Stanford University | 2012 |
| Jane Clarke | University of Cambridge | 2023 |
| William M. Clemons Jr. | California Institute of Technology | 2022 |
| G. Marius Clore | National Institutes of Health | 2014 |
| Carolyn Cohen (died 2017) | Brandeis University | 1996 |
| Esther Conwell (died 2014) | University of Rochester | 1990 |
| Donald Crothers (died 2014) | Yale University | 1987 |
| David R. Davies (died 2016) | National Institutes of Health | 1978 |
| William DeGrado | University of California, San Francisco | 1999 |
| Johann Deisenhofer | University of Texas Southwestern Medical Center | 1997 |
| David J. DeRosier | Brandeis University | 2003 |
| Richard Dickerson (died 2025) | University of California, Los Angeles | 1985 |
| Ken A. Dill | Stony Brook University | 2008 |
| H. Jane Dyson | Scripps Research | 2022 |
| William A. Eaton | National Institutes of Health | 2006 |
| Edward H. Egelman | University of Virginia | 2019 |
| David Eisenberg | University of California, Los Angeles | 1989 |
| Elliot L. Elson | Washington University in St. Louis | 2021 |
| Donald Engelman | Yale University | 1997 |
| S. Walter Englander | University of Pennsylvania | 1997 |
| George Feher (died 2017) | University of California, San Diego | 1975 |
| Juli Feigon | University of California, Los Angeles | 2009 |
| Alan Fersht | University of Cambridge | 1993 |
| Robert Fletterick | University of California, San Francisco | 2010 |
| Joachim Frank | Columbia University | 2006 |
| Carl Frieden | Washington University in St. Louis | 1988 |
| Walter Gilbert | Harvard University | 1976 |
| Robert Glaeser | University of California, Berkeley | 2016 |
| Yale Goldman | University of California, Davis | 2017 |
| Eric Gouaux | Oregon Health & Science University | 2010 |
| Philip Green | University of Washington | 2001 |
| Robert G. Griffin | Massachusetts Institute of Technology | 2021 |
| Nikolaus Grigorieff | University of Massachusetts Chan Medical School | 2021 |
| Angela Gronenborn | University of Pittsburgh | 2007 |
| Taekjip Ha | Boston Children's Hospital | 2015 |
| Gordon Hammes | Duke University | 1973 |
| Stephen C. Harrison | Harvard University | 1991 |
| Stefan Hell | Max Planck Institute for Multidisciplinary Sciences | 2016 |
| Terrell Hill (died 2014) | University of California, Santa Cruz | 1965 |
| Keith Hodgson | Stanford University | 2011 |
| Barry Honig | Columbia University | 2004 |
| Wayne Hubbell | University of California, Los Angeles | 2005 |
| James Hurley | University of California, Berkeley | 2020 |
| John (Jack) E. Johnson Jr. | Scripps Research | 2024 |
| Lewis E. Kay | University of Toronto | 2020 |
| Sung-Hou Kim | University of California, Berkeley | 1994 |
| Alexander Klibanov | Massachusetts Institute of Technology | 1995 |
| Anthony Kossiakoff | University of Chicago | 2023 |
| John Kuriyan | Vanderbilt University | 2001 |
| Robert S. Langer | Massachusetts Institute of Technology | 1992 |
| Michael Levitt | Stanford University | 2002 |
| William Lipscomb (died 2011) | Harvard University | 1961 |
| Karolin Luger | University of Colorado Boulder | 2018 |
| Roderick MacKinnon | Rockefeller University | 2000 |
| Susan Marqusee | University of California, Berkeley | 2016 |
| Brian Matthews | University of Oregon | 1986 |
| Stephen Mayo | California Institute of Technology | 2004 |
| J. Andrew McCammon | University of California, San Diego | 2011 |
| Ann McDermott | Columbia University | 2006 |
| Hartmut Michel | Max Planck Institute of Biophysics | 1996 |
| Peter Moore | Yale University | 1997 |
| Manuel Morales (died 2009) | University of the Pacific | 1975 |
| Eva Nogales | University of California, Berkeley | 2015 |
| Ruth Nussinov | National Cancer Institute | 2025 |
| J. L. Oncley (died 2004) | University of Michigan | 1947 |
| George Oster (died 2018) | University of California, Berkeley | 2004 |
| Carl Pabo | Humanity 2050, Inc. | 1998 |
| Arthur Palmer | Columbia University | 2024 |
| Max Perutz (died 2002) | University of Cambridge | 1970 |
| Gregory Petsko | Brigham and Women's Hospital | 1995 |
| Thomas D. Pollard | Yale University | 1992 |
| Joseph Puglisi | Stanford University | 2014 |
| Stephen Quake | Stanford University | 2013 |
| Sheena Radford | University of Leeds | 2024 |
| Alfred Redfield (died 2019) | Brandeis University | 1979 |
| Douglas C. Rees | California Institute of Technology | 2000 |
| Frederic M. Richards (died 2009) | Yale University | 1971 |
| Jane S. Richardson | Duke University | 1991 |
| Timothy Richmond | ETH Zurich | 2007 |
| Rutherford N. Robertson (died 2001) | Australian National University | 1962 |
| Michael G. Rossmann (died 2019) | Purdue University | 1984 |
| Andrej Sali | University of California, San Francisco | 2018 |
| John Schellman (died 2014) | University of Oregon | 1982 |
| Celia Schiffer | University of Massachusetts Chan Medical School | 2024 |
| John Sedat | University of California, San Francisco | 2009 |
| David E. Shaw | D. E. Shaw Research | 2014 |
| Robert Shulman (died 2026) | Yale University | 1974 |
| Stephen Sligar | University of Illinois Urbana-Champaign | 2024 |
| Janet Smith | University of Michigan | 2020 |
| Timothy Springer | Harvard University | 1996 |
| Walther Stoeckenius (died 2013) | University of California, San Francisco | 1978 |
| Robert Stroud | University of California, San Francisco | 2003 |
| Lubert Stryer (died 2024) | Stanford University | 1984 |
| Michael F. Summers | University of Maryland, Baltimore County | 2016 |
| Attila Szabo | National Institutes of Health | 2010 |
| Charles Tanford (died 2009) | Duke University | 1972 |
| Thomas Terwilliger | New Mexico Consortium | 2025 |
| Janet Thornton | European Bioinformatics Institute | 2003 |
| Ignacio Tinoco (died 2016) | University of California, Berkeley | 1985 |
| Robert Tycko | National Institutes of Health | 2020 |
| K. E. van Holde (died 2019) | Oregon State University | 1989 |
| Gerhard Wagner | Harvard University | 2013 |
| John E. Walker | University of Cambridge | 2004 |
| Arieh Warshel | University of Southern California | 2009 |
| Watt Webb (died 2020) | Cornell University | 1995 |
| William Weis (died 2023) | Stanford University | 2019 |
| Don Wiley (died 2001) | Harvard University | 1991 |
| James R. Williamson | Scripps Research | 2022 |
| Cynthia Wolberger | Johns Hopkins University | 2019 |
| Peter Wright | Scripps Research | 2008 |
| Ada Yonath | Weizmann Institute of Science | 2003 |
| Xiaowei Zhuang | Harvard University | 2012 |
| Bruno H. Zimm (died 2005) | University of California, San Diego | 1958 |
| Robert Zwanzig (died 2014) | National Institutes of Health | 1972 |
