= Emily M. Gray Award =

Award given for significant contributions to education in biophysics

- Awarded for: significant contributions to education in biophysics
- Sponsored by: Biophysical Society in Rockville, Maryland
- Date: 1997
- Country: USA

The Emily M. Gray Award from the Biophysical Society in Rockville, Maryland, is given in recognition of "significant contributions to education in biophysics." The award was established in 1997 and first awarded the year thereafter.

== Award recipients ==
- 1998: Muriel S. Prouty
- 1999: Kensal E. van Holde
- 2000: Charles Cantor and Paul Schimmel
- 2001: Jane Richardson
- 2002: Norma Allewell
- 2003: Michael Summers
- 2004: Richard D. Ludescher
- 2005: Barry R. Lentz
- 2006: Ignacio Tinoco, Jr.
- 2007: John Steve Olson
- 2008: David S. Eisenberg and Donald M. Crothers
- 2009: Philip C. Nelson
- 2010: Greta Pifat-Mrzljak
- 2011: Bertil Hille
- 2012: Kenneth Dill and Sarina Bromberg
- 2013: Louis de Felice
- 2014: Alberto Diaspro
- 2015: Meyer Jackson
- 2016: Douglas Robinson
- 2017: Enrique De La Cruz
- 2018: Madeline Shea
- 2019: Yves De Koninck
- 2021: Doug Barrick
