= Stephen D. Levene =

American biophysicist

Stephen Daniel Levene
- Born: New York, NY, United States
- Education: Columbia University; Yale University
- Known for: Nucleic acid structure and function, physical genomics
- Scientific career
- Fields: Chemistry, Biophysics, Bioengineering
- Workplaces: University of Texas at Dallas; Lawrence Berkeley Laboratory; University of California, San Diego
- Thesis: Studies of Sequence-directed Bending and Flexibility in DNA (1985)
- Doctoral advisor: Donald M. Crothers
- Website: https://labs.utdallas.edu/levenelab/

Stephen Levene is an American biophysicist and professor of bioengineering, molecular biology, and physics at the University of Texas at Dallas.

== Early life and education ==
Levene was born in New York City and attended Horace Mann School and Andrew Hill High School in San Jose, California. He received his A.B. in Chemistry from Columbia University and his Ph.D. in Chemistry from Yale University. His doctoral work demonstrated and quantified the phenomenon of sequence-directed bending in DNA due to adenine-thymine tracts, and pioneered the use of Monte Carlo simulation to compute cyclization probabilities of DNA molecules having arbitrary preferred geometries. Upon leaving Yale, Levene became an American Cancer Society postdoctoral fellow at UC San Diego with Bruno Zimm, where he worked on the physical mechanism of gel electrophoresis.

== Career ==
=== Research interests ===
Levene's research interests are broadly in the area of genome architecture and its maintenance by enzyme mechanisms and protein-DNA interactions. His work in this area began from the time he was a staff scientist at the Human Genome Center at Lawrence Berkeley National Laboratory, when he collaborated with Nicholas Cozzarelli's group on the structure and properties of supercoiled DNA and DNA catenanes. Levene's group has made both experimental and theoretical/computational contributions to understanding DNA topology and its relationship to local DNA structures, DNA-loop formation, site-specific DNA recombination, the structure of human telomeres, and extrachromosomal-circular DNA.
