= Kossiakoff =

Kossiakoff is a surname, a transliteration of the Russian surname Kosyakov. Notable people with the surname include:

- Alexander Kossiakoff (1914–2005), Russian-American system engineer, father of Anthony
- Anthony Kossiakoff (born 1945), American structural biologist, son of Alexander
