= Biophysical Journal =

- Discipline: Biophysics
- Language: English
- Edited by: Vasanthi Jayaraman

Publication details
- Publisher: Cell Press
- Frequency: Biweekly
- Open access: delayed (after 12 months)
- Impact factor: 2.9 (2024)

Standard abbreviations
- ISO 4: Biophys. J.

Indexing
- CODEN: BIOJAU
- ISSN: 0006-3495 (print); 1542-0086 (web)
- LCCN: 63006481
- OCLC no.: 01390110

Links
- Journal homepage; Online access

Biophysical Journal is a biweekly peer-reviewed scientific journal published by Cell Press on behalf of the Biophysical Society. The journal was established in 1960 and covers all aspects of biophysics.

The journal occasionally publishes special issues devoted to specific topics. In addition, a supplemental "abstracts issue" is published, containing abstracts of presentations at the Biophysical Society Annual Meeting. The editor-in-chief is Vasanthi Jayaraman.

== History ==
The following persons are or have been editor-in-chief:

- 1960-1963 Frank Brink, Jr.
- 1964-1966 J. Lawrence Oncley
- 1967-1969 Fred M. Snell
- 1969-1973 Max A. Lauffer
- 1973-1977 Frederick A. Dodge
- 1977-1980 V. Adrian Parsegian
- 1980-1983 John Gergely
- 1984-1987 Eugene Ackerman
- 1988-1992 Thomas E. Thompson
- 1993-1997 Victor A. Bloomfield
- 1997-2002 Peter B. Moore
- 2002-2007 Robert Callender
- 2007-2012 Edward H. Egelman
- 2012-2017 Leslie Loew
- 2017-2021 Jane Dyson
- 2022-2027 Vasanthi Jayaraman
