= Laura Finzi =

Biophysicist

- Education: University of Bologna; University of New Mexico
- Scientific career
- Fields: Biophysics
- Workplaces: Emory University University of Milan Brandeis University
- Thesis: Direct observation of the chiral macromolecular organization of the thylakoid membranes in chloroplasts by differential polarization (1990)
- Academic advisors: Carlos Bustamante
- Website: physics.emory.edu/faculty/finzi/

Laura Finzi is an Italian-American biophysicist whose research includes single-molecule experiments and modelling to explain mechanisms of transcriptional regulation. She is the Dr. Waenard L. Miller, Jr. ’69 and Sheila M. Miller Endowed Chair in Medical Biophysics at Clemson University.

== Education ==
Finzi received her Laurea in industrial chemistry from the University of Bologna in 1984. She then moved to the United States and completed a Master's (1987) and a PhD (1990) in Chemistry at the University of New Mexico.

== Career ==
In 1991, Finzi began as a post-doctoral fellow in the Institute of Molecular Biology at the University of Oregon under the supervision of Carlos Bustamante. In 1992, She joined the biochemistry department as a post-doctoral fellow at Brandeis University under the supervision of Jeff Gelles. In 1993, she became a researcher in the biology department at the University of Milan and was offered tenure in 1996. In 2005, Finzi joined the faculty of the physics department at Emory University, becoming a full professor in 2012.

In 2024 Finzi moved to Clemson University and in October 2024 she was named the Dr. Waenard L. Miller, Jr. ’69 and Sheila M. Miller Endowed Chair in Medical Biophysics.

== Selected publications ==
- Finzi, Laura; Gelles, Jeff (1995-01-20). "Measurement of Lactose Repressor-Mediated Loop Formation and Breakdown in Single DNA Molecules". Science. 267 (5196): 378–380. Bibcode:1995Sci...267..378F. doi:10.1126/science.7824935. ISSN 0036-8075. PMID 7824935.
- Smith, Steven B.; Finzi, Laura; Bustamante, Carlos (1992-11-13). "Direct Mechanical Measurements of the Elasticity of Single DNA Molecules by Using Magnetic Beads". Science. 258 (5085): 1122–1126. Bibcode:1992Sci...258.1122S. doi:10.1126/science.1439819. ISSN 0036-8075. PMID 1439819.
- Finzi, L; Bustamante, C; Garab, G; Juang, C B (1989). "Direct observation of large chiral domains in chloroplast thylakoid membranes by differential polarization microscopy". Proceedings of the National Academy of Sciences. 86 (22): 8748–8752. Bibcode:1989PNAS...86.8748F. doi:10.1073/pnas.86.22.8748. ISSN 0027-8424. PMC 298367. PMID 2813422.

== Honors and awards ==
In 2023, she was elected a Fellow of the American Physical Society for "pioneering work on magnetic tweezers to resolve the difference between full polymer elastic theory and the simplifying freely jointed chain model and to demonstrate the key role of DNA supercoiling in transcription regulation, and for using tethered particle motion to study genetic switches."
