= Manuel Morales =

Manuel Morales may refer to:

- Manuel Morales (martyr) (1898–1926), Mexican martyred layman and Roman Catholic Saint
- Manuel Morales (biophysicist) (1919–2009), Honduran-American biophysicist
- Manuel Morales (basketball) (born 1987), Peruvian basketball player
- Manuel Morales Dávila (1926–2020), Bolivian lawyer and politician, affiliated with the Movimiento al Socialismo
- Manuel Morales Pareja (1864–1932), Spanish artist and politician, mayor of Barcelona in 1918–1919
- Manuel Morales (politician), Peruvian politician and jurist, twice Minister of the Interior (Peru)
