= Olga Boudker =

American scientist and academic

- Education: Novosibirsk State University; Johns Hopkins University; Weizmann Institute of Science
- Scientific career
- Workplaces: Weill Cornell Medicine; Massachusetts Institute of Technology
- Thesis: Conformational stability of large oligometric proteins (1999)

Olga Vladimirovna Boudker (Russian: Ольга Владимировна Будкер) is a Russian born physicist who is a professor of physiology and biophysics at the Weill Cornell Medicine. She looks to understand the mechanisms of membrane transporters in cellular function. She was elected a fellow of the National Academy of Sciences in 2022.

== Early life and education ==
Boudker was born in Russia and is a third generation scientist. She was an undergraduate student at the Novosibirsk State University. She moved to the Weizmann Institute of Science for graduate studies, working on the biochemistry of sphingolipids. She joined Johns Hopkins University for her doctoral research, investigating the stability of oligomeric proteins. Boudker then joined Massachusetts Institute of Technology and Columbia University as a postdoctoral fellow. During her postdoctoral research she became interested in the mechanisms of membrane transporters.

== Research and career ==
Boudker started her lab at the Weill Cornell Medical College in 2005. Her research considers the molecular mechanisms that underpin cellular function, with a focus on transporter proteins. She has developed a suite of structural probes to better understand these processes, including cryogenic electron microscopy. In 2015, she was named a Howard Hughes Medical Institute investigator.

In 2021, Boudker was appointed the Acting Chair of Biophysics. In 2022, she was elected Fellow of the National Academy of Sciences.

== Selected publications ==
- Olga Boudker; Renae M Ryan; Dinesh Yernool; Keiko Shimamoto; Eric Gouaux (25 January 2007). "Coupling substrate and ion binding to extracellular gate of a sodium-dependent aspartate transporter". Nature. 445 (7126): 387–93. doi:10.1038/nature05455. ISSN 1476-4687. PMID 17230192. Wikidata Q27643578.
- David Drew; Olga Boudker (21 March 2016). "Shared Molecular Mechanisms of Membrane Transporters". Annual Review of Biochemistry. 85: 543–572. doi:10.1146/annurev-biochem-060815-014520. ISSN 0066-4154. PMID 27023848. Wikidata Q38792631.
- Dinesh Yernool; Olga Boudker; Yan Jin; Eric Gouaux (1 October 2004). "Structure of a glutamate transporter homologue from Pyrococcus horikoshii". Nature. 431 (7010): 811–818. doi:10.1038/nature03018. ISSN 1476-4687. PMID 15483603. Wikidata Q30032687.
