= Boris Shraiman =

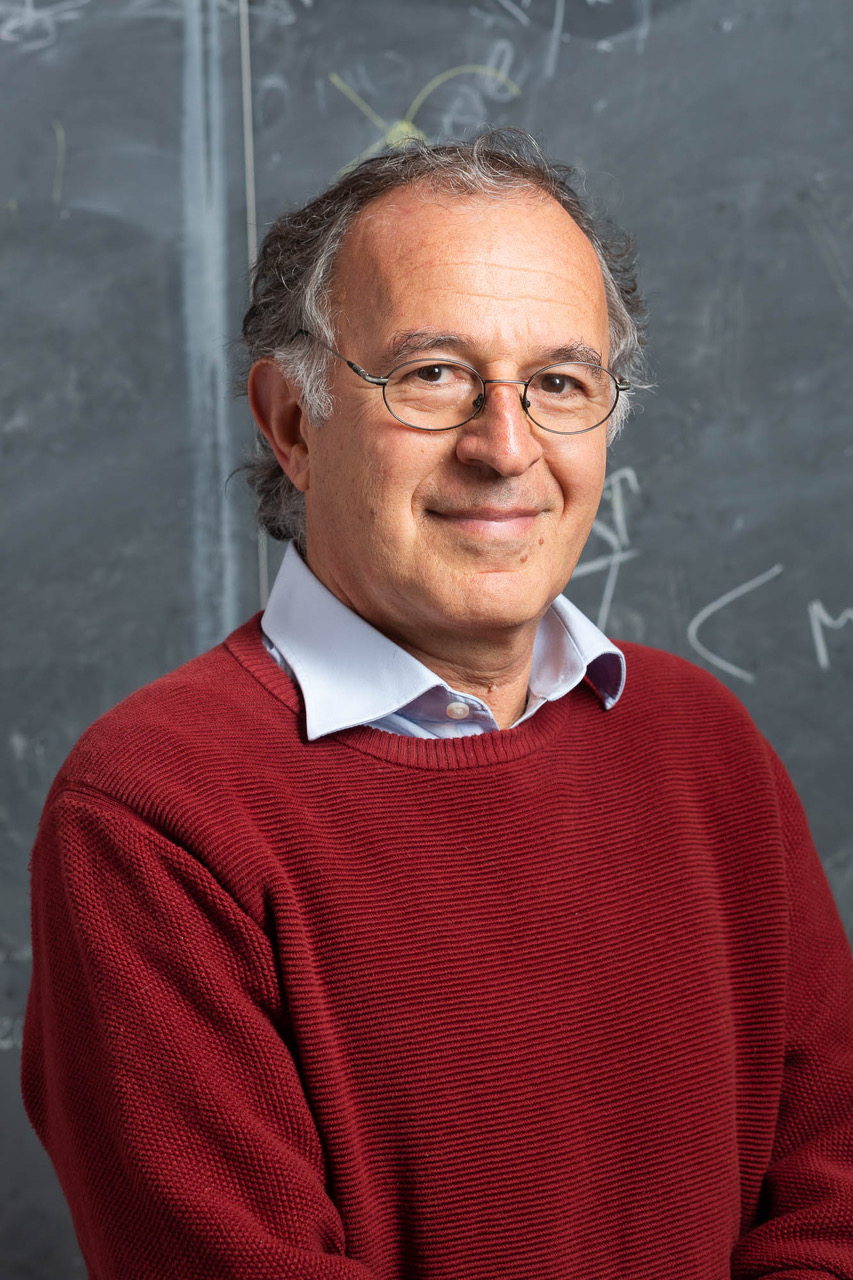
- Born: 1956 (age 69–70); Leningrad (now St. Petersburg), USSR
- Education: University of Lowell (BS); Harvard University (PhD)
- Known for: Statistical Physics and Physics of Living Matter
- Awards: Max Delbruck Prize in Biological Physics (2026); Member, National Academy of Sciences (2011); Susan F. Gurley Chair in Theoretical Physics and Biology (2009); Fellow, American Physical Society (1998)
- Scientific career
- Institutions: University of California, Santa Barbara; Rutgers University; Bell Labs; University of Chicago
- Thesis: Application of the Renormalization Group Methods to the Study of Critical Transitions in Dynamical Systems. (1983)
- Doctoral advisor: Paul Cecil Martin
- Website: www.kitp.ucsb.edu/shraiman

Boris Shraiman is an American theoretical physicist working on statistical physics and biology. He is a Permanent Member of the Kavli Institute for Theoretical Physics and the Susan F Gurley Professor of Theoretical Physics and Biology at the University of California, Santa Barbara.

== Biography ==
Shraiman earned a PhD from Harvard in 1983 and did postdoctoral work at the University of Chicago in the James Franck Institute. In his early work, Shraiman addressed how dynamical systems transition to chaos and how patterns form in viscous flows and dendritic growth. He moved to Bell Labs, where he worked on quantum materials, then later became a professor at Rutgers University in 2002 and the University of California, Santa Barbara in 2004. He has advanced the understanding of turbulent fluids, and since 2000, his work has built connections between statistical physics and biological problems. In particular, his research has pointed to the interplay between mechanics and morphogenesis, which addresses the problem of "growth and form" in animal development, and developed models to describe evolutionary dynamics in populations such as influenza. He became a member of the National Academy of Sciences in 2011. Shraiman chaired the 27th Solvay Conference in Physics: "Physics of Living Matter: Space, Time and Information" in 2017.
