= S. Walter Englander =

American biophysicist

Solomon Walter Englander
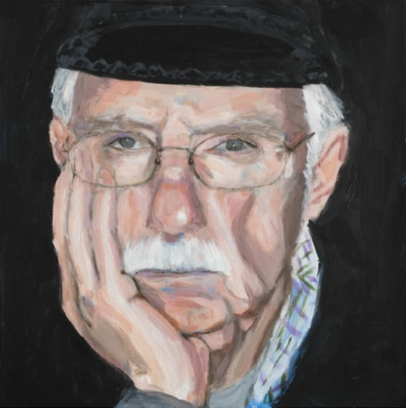
- Portrait of S. Walter Englander, painted by his wife, Carole Clarke. Philadelphia, PA, 2023.
- Born: Baltimore, Maryland
- Education: University of Maryland; University of Pittsburgh
- Awards: The American Association for the Advancement of Science (1998); The Biophysical Society (2000); The American Society for Biochemistry and Molecular Biology, Herbert A. Sober Memorial Lectureship (2008); The Biophysical Society, Founders Award (2010)
- Scientific career
- Fields: Biophysics
- Workplaces: National Institutes of Health; Dartmouth College; University of Pennsylvania
- Website: https://www.med.upenn.edu/apps/faculty/index.php/g275/p7873

Solomon Walter Englander is the Gershon-Cohen Professor Emeritus of Biochemistry, Biophysics, and Medical Science at the University of Pennsylvania. He is known for pioneering the development of the field of hydrogen exchange (HX) studies.

== Early life and education ==
Englander was born in 1930 into an immigrant, working class, orthodox Jewish family in Baltimore. Torn between entering the rabbinate or a career in professional baseball, he instead pursued an undergraduate degree at the University of Maryland, graduating in 1951.

He completed his MS and PhD degrees in biophysics at the University of Pittsburgh in 1953 and 1958, respectively. Between degrees, Englander was drafted into the post-Korean War army. He returned to do postdoctoral work with William F. Harrington and Peter von Hippel at the National Institutes of Health. In 1960, he joined Dartmouth College with von Hippel, where he remained until 1967. He spent one year at the Danish Atomic Energy Commission Research Establishment (AEC) with Sigurd Nielsen as a visiting scientist. In 1967, he joined the University of Pennsylvania where he spent the rest of his academic career until retirement at the age of 91 in 2021.

== Research career ==
Englander's research has focused on developing methods for HX measurement; accurately calibrating all aspects of protein and nucleic acid HX chemistry; and settling the bases for HX interpretation in terms of H-bonded structure, detailed structural dynamics, and energetics. As a result, HX methods have become an important tool in research to discover how proteins and nucleic acids function to make life possible.

Englander has used HX to explain several biomolecular problems, including nucleic acid and protein "breathing" reactions, and site-resolved energy transfer and utilization. He discovered protein "foldons" and demonstrated their role in stepwise sequential protein folding pathways. The understanding of protein folding, unfolding, and misfolding is fundamental to ongoing research in many biological processes central to health and disease.

== Awards and honors ==
Englander was elected to the National Academy of Sciences in 1997 and the American Academy of Arts & Sciences in 2006. He was elected as an honorary fellow of the American Association for the Advancement of Science in 1998 and the Biophysical Society in 2000.

=== Herbert A. Sober Memorial Lectureship Award (2008) ===
In 2008, Englander was awarded the Herbert A. Sober Lectureship at the annual American Society for Biochemistry and Molecular Biology meeting in San Diego. The lectureship is awarded every two years and recognizes outstanding biochemical and molecular biological research, with particular emphasis on the development of methods and techniques to aid in scientific research.

On being awarded the Lectureship, George Rose, Krieger-Eisenhower Professor at The Johns Hopkins University, said of Englander:

"Scientists are of many types. Among the very best are those rare individuals who devise an important approach as an end in itself, like virtuoso instrumentalists perfecting their art. Rarer still are those who respond to a higher music, developing innovative new methods to pursue fundamental problems. Walter Englander is among the very few who fall squarely into this latter category."

=== The Biophysical Society Founders Award (2010) ===
In 2010, Englander received the Biophysical Society's annual Founders Award. The award is given to scientists for outstanding achievement in biophysics. He received the award "for pioneering the development of hydrogen exchange techniques for exploring the stability, interactions and dynamics of macromolecules and their folding."

== Autobiography ==
Englander authored a brief autobiography, "HX and Me: Understanding Allostery, Folding, and Protein Machines," which was published in the May 2023 volume of the Annual Review of Biophysics. The autobiography is a retrospective on his life and his work in biochemistry, biophysics, and medical sciences. Articles in the journal are peer-reviewed by the editorial committee and qualified authors in the field.
