= Daniela Rhodes =

British structural and molecular biologist

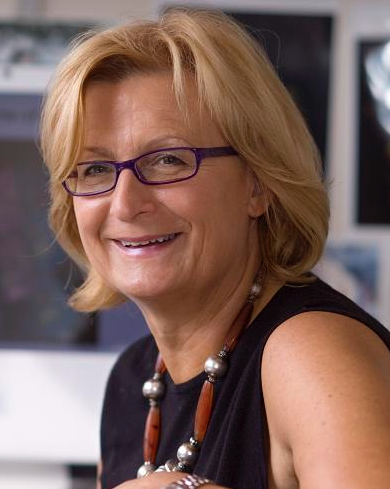
- Daniela Rhodes at the Laboratory of Molecular Biology
- Education: University of Cambridge
- Awards: FRS (2007); The WLA Prize in Life Science or Medicine (2023)
- Scientific career
- Workplaces: Nanyang Technological University; Laboratory of Molecular Biology
- Thesis: The helical periodicity of DNA in solution and in chromatin (1982)
- Doctoral advisor: Aaron Klug
- Website: www2.mrc-lmb.cam.ac.uk/group-leaders/emeritus/daniela-rhodes/

Daniela Bargellini Rhodes FRS (born 1946) is an Italian structural and molecular biologist. She was a senior scientist at the Laboratory of Molecular Biology in Cambridge, England, where she worked, and later studied for her PhD under the supervision of Nobel laureate Aaron Klug. Continuing her work under the tutelage of Aaron Klug at Cambridge, she was appointed group leader in 1983, obtained tenure in 1987 and was promoted to senior scientist in 1994 (equivalent to full professor). Subsequently, she served as director of studies between 2003 and 2006. She has also been visiting professor at both "La Sapienza" in Rome, Italy and the Rockefeller University in NY, USA.

== Career and research ==
Daniela Rhodes has made many fundamental contributions to understanding the structure and function of nucleic acids and their biologically important interactions with many different proteins. Her work combines biochemical analyses with direct structural determination. She determined the structures of a number of important protein-DNA complexes involved in transcription, such as zinc-fingers and nuclear hormone receptors. She has provided some of the first structural information on telomeric proteins, such as yeast Rap1p and human TRF1 and TRF2 and their complexes with DNA. Throughout her career she has made many contributions to the understanding of chromatin structure and function. She was involved in determining the structure of the nucleosome core particle, has worked on transcriptionally active chromatin and more recently on the higher order 30nm structure of chromatin. Her research continues to focus on understanding how the structure of chromatin is involved in transcriptional regulation and how telomeres are involved in preserving chromosome integrity.

She joined the School of Biological Sciences at Nanyang Technological University (NTU), in Singapore, as professor in September 2011 and was additionally appointed professor at the Lee Kong Chian School of Medicine in September 2012. In April 2014 she was appointed Director of the newly formed Nanyang Institute of Structural Biology.

Daniela left NTU in 2020 and is an Emeritus Scientist at the Laboratory of Molecular Biology.

== Awards and honours ==
- Laureate of the 2023 World Laureates Association Prize in Life Science or Medicine (With Timothy J. Richmond and Karolin Luger)
- Elected a Fellow of the Royal Society (FRS) in 2007
- Elected member of EMBO as of 1996.
- Elected member of Academia Europaea as of 2011.
- She is a Fellow of Clare Hall, Cambridge.
- Asteroid 80008 Danielarhodes, discovered by Italian astronomers Luciano Tesi and Andrea Boattini in 1999, was named in her honor. The official naming citation was published by the Minor Planet Center on 10 December 2011 (M.P.C. 77507).
