= Lorin J. Mullins =

American biophysicist (1917-1993)

- Born: September 23, 1917; San Francisco
- Died: April 14, 1993 (aged 75); Chestertown, Maryland
- Citizenship: US
- Partner: Rowena née Stetson
- Children: 2

Lorin John Mullins (September 23, 1917–April 14, 1993) was an American biophysicist who researched the movement of ions across the cell membrane. He served as the editor of the Annual Review of Biophysics and Bioengineering for ten years.

== Early life and education ==
Lorin John Mullins was born on September 23, 1917, in San Francisco, California. He attended the University of California, Berkeley for a bachelor's degree in 1937 and a PhD in physical chemistry. His PhD advisor was zoologist Sumner Cushing Brooks; he researched how the unicellular algae Nitella transported ions.

== Career ==
From 1940 to 1943, he was employed under Wallace O. Fenn at the University of Rochester; they researched the permeability of red blood cells to potassium and sodium ions. He was then part of the United States Army during World War II, spending time in the US training pilots in the operation of Boeing B-17 Flying Fortresses, though also flying some combat missions in Europe. He also researched the effect of high altitudes on pilots. Following the war, he had a series of brief jobs and research fellowships in Europe, Johns Hopkins University, with George de Hevesy at the Niels Bohr Institute in Copenhagen, and the Stazione Zoologica Anton Dohrn in Naples. He joined the faculty of Purdue University in 1950. A majority of his research focused on the movement of ions across the cell membrane. In 1959 he joined the University of Maryland as chair of its biophysics department.

He joined the Bermuda Institute of Ocean Sciences in 1951 and the Marine Biological Laboratory in 1956, where he worked until 1977. He was on the board of the National Institute of Neurological Disorders and Stroke, part of the National Institutes of Health, from 1969 to 1973. From 1973–1983 he was the editor of the Annual Review of Biophysics and Bioengineering. He retired from the University of Maryland School of Medicine in 1988, at which point he became a professor emeritus.

== Personal life and death ==
He was married to Rowena née Stetson; the couple had two children together. He died on April 14, 1993, from cancer at the age of 76 in Chestertown, Maryland.
