= Mark A. Lemmon =

English biochemist (born 1964)

Mark Lemmon FRS
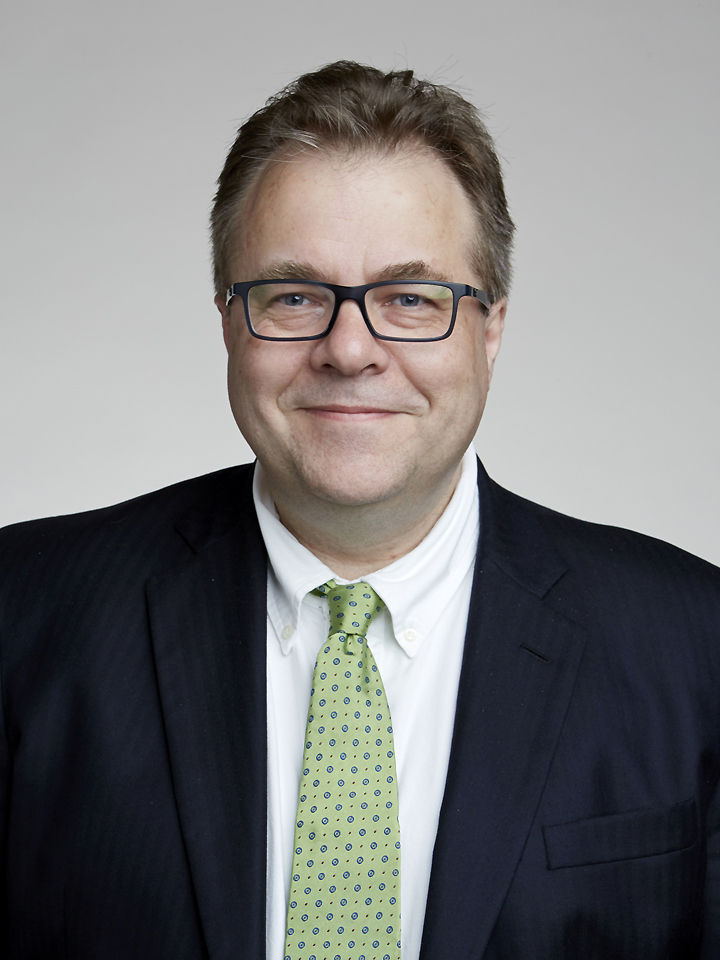
- Lemmon in 2016
- Born: 1964 (age 61–62); Norfolk, England
- Education: Norwich School
- Alma mater: University of Oxford; Yale University
- Spouse: Katherine Ferguson
- Scientific career
- Fields: Growth factor receptor signaling; Cancer Biology
- Institutions: University of Pennsylvania; Yale University; New York University
- Thesis: Specific interactions between transmembrane alpha-helices: Their role in the oligomerisation of integral membrane proteins (1993)
- Doctoral advisor: Donald Engelman
- Website: med.upenn.edu/lemmonlab/; medicine.yale.edu/pharm/people/mark_lemmon.profile

Mark Andrew Lemmon FRS (born 1964) is an English-born biochemist and the Alfred Gilman Professor and Department Chair of Pharmacology at Yale University where he also directs the Cancer Biology Institute.

== Education ==
Lemmon was born in Norfolk, England in 1964 and grew up in Taverham and Poringland. He was educated at Norwich School (from 1976 to 1983), and then at Hertford College, Oxford, from which he graduated with a first class Bachelor of Arts (BA) degree in biochemistry in 1988. He completed his PhD at Yale University as a Howard Hughes Medical Institute Predoctoral Fellow supervised by Donald Engelman for research on the oligomerization of transmembrane α-helices.

== Research and career ==
Following his PhD, Lemmon was a postdoctoral researcher and fellow of the Damon Runyon Cancer Research Foundation at New York University in the laboratory of Joseph Schlessinger. Following his postdoctoral research, Lemmon was recruited to the department of biochemistry and biophysics at the University of Pennsylvania Perelman School of Medicine, where he gained tenure in 2001 and became departmental chair in 2008 before moving to Yale University in 2015.

Lemmon's research combines biochemistry and structural biology with cell biology, focusing on understanding molecular mechanisms of transmembrane signalling by cell-surface growth factor receptors such as the epidermal growth factor (EGF) receptor and other receptor tyrosine kinases. With Kathryn Ferguson and others, he also played an important role in understanding the structure and function of the Pleckstrin homology domain in phosphoinositide signalling and elsewhere.

Lemmon has made important contributions to the discovery of both normal and pathological activation mechanisms of growth factor receptors and the signalling networks that they engage within cells. He is also committed to exploiting this understanding clinically. These receptors and their downstream effectors are activated aberrantly in numerous cancers, and are important targets of cancer drugs. Lemmon's recent work has focused on the need to understand the biochemistry of oncogenic activation to use such drugs effectively.

Before moving to Yale, Lemmon was George W. Raiziss Professor and Chair of Biochemistry and Biophysics in the Perelman School of Medicine at the University of Pennsylvania. His research has been funded by the National Cancer Institute, the National Institute of General Medical Sciences, and the Department of Defense Congressionally Directed Medical Research Programs.

Lemmon serves on the editorial boards of several scientific journals, including Cell, Molecular Cell, Molecular and Cellular Biology, and Science Signaling. Having served as an associate editor for the Biochemical Journal for many years, he was appointed chair of the editorial board in January 2021. Between 2007 and 2013, Lemmon served as secretary for the American Society for Biochemistry and Molecular Biology (ASBMB).

== Awards and honours ==
Lemmon was elected a Fellow of the Royal Society (FRS) in 2016, as an ASBMB Fellow in 2023, and as a Member of the Connecticut Academy of Science and Engineering (CASE) in 2024. In 2012 Lemmon was awarded the Dorothy Hodgkin prize by the Protein Society.
