= Enrique De La Cruz =

Cuban-American researcher and educator

- Education: Rutgers University-Newark; Johns Hopkins University
- Scientific career
- Workplaces: Yale University

Enrique De La Cruz is a Cuban-American researcher and educator, known for his research in biochemistry regarding the cytoskeleton of cells.

== Early life and education ==
Enrique De La Cruz was born to Cuban parents who immigrated to the United States in the early 1960s following the Cuban Revolution. He grew up in Kearny, New Jersey, where his parents emphasized the importance of education as a path to success. His father worked as a welder in a factory, while his mother in a hospital.

At the age of 16, De La Cruz was selected to participate in a work-study program at Hoffman-La Roche, a pharmaceutical company in Nutley, New Jersey. He was the only student from his high school to receive this opportunity, which required a 40 to 45-minute bus commute each way. This experience sparked his interest in scientific research and encouraged him to pursue a career in biochemistry.

De La Cruz attended Rutgers University-Newark, where he earned a B.A. in biology and chemistry. During his undergraduate years, he participated in the Minority Biomedical Research Support Program, a National Institute of General Medical Sciences initiative designed to expose underrepresented students to laboratory research. He later credited this program with shaping his career trajectory by providing hands-on experience in scientific research.

He continued his education at Johns Hopkins University School of Medicine, earning a Ph.D. in cell biology. During this time, he developed a strong interest in actin filaments, inspired by his undergraduate coursework in cell biology. His fascination with the subject led him to pursue graduate research under Tom Pollard, a leading expert in the field. He attended the Salk Institute for his last year of graduate school.

== Career ==
De La Cruz joined Yale University's school of medicine faculty in 2001 initially as an assistant professor before becoming a professor of molecular biophysics and biochemistry. De La Cruz was appointed head of Branford College in 2017. He was appointed chair of the Department of Molecular Biophysics and Biochemistry at Yale in July 2020.

In addition to his faculty position, De La Cruz is also an associate editor for the Journal of Biological Chemistry of the American Society for Biochemistry and Molecular Biology.

Before joining Yale as an assistant professor in 2001, Enrique De La Cruz was a Life Sciences Research Foundation postdoctoral fellow at the Perelman School of Medicine at the University of Pennsylvania. He also has held visiting professor and scientist roles at prestigious research centers such as Curie, ESPCI Paris Tech, and Centre National de la Recherche Scientifique in Grenoble.

== Contributions ==
Enrique De La Cruz has contributed to over 92 peer-reviewed studies for various journals and publications. His most recent studies have been over the movement of Actin filaments. As well as, molecular motor proteins such as myosins and RNA helicases. In 2018, he received the Emily Gray Award in Education from the Biophysical Society. Cell Mentor included De La Cruz as part of their 100 most inspiring Hispanic/Latinx scientists in 2020. In 2022, De La Cruz was elected to the American Association for the Advancement of Science. De La Cruz was named one of seven 2025 Society Fellows of the Biophysical Society in 2024 for his actin cytoskeleton and molecular motor protein research.

Enrique De La Cruz is also dedicated to making science more accessible to underrepresented students, serving on Yale School of Medicine's Poorvu Center for Teaching and Learning as well as Yale School of Medicine's Minority Organization for Retention and Expansion Steering Committee. In 2026, he became president-elect of the Biophysical Society.
