= Max Delbruck Prize =

Award in biological physics

The Max Delbruck Prize, formerly known as the Biological physics prize, is awarded by the Division of Biological Physics of the American Physical Society, to recognize and encourage outstanding achievement in biological physics research. The prize was established in 1981, and renamed for Max Delbrück in 2006. The award consists of $10,000, an allowance for travel to the meeting where the prize is awarded, and a certificate. It was presented biennially in even-numbered years until 2014, and will be presented annually starting 2015.

== Past winners ==
- 2026: Boris Shraiman

For contributions to morphogenesis, evolution, and biological information processing, combining mastery of biological knowledge, innovative analysis of biological data, and rigorous theoretical reasoning to uncover deep insights into the underlying principles of biological processes.

- 2025: Devarajan Thirumalai

For pioneering theoretical models that guided experimentalists and explained experimental results for protein and RNA folding, chromosome dynamics, molecular motors, and collective cell dynamics, and for changing our understanding of how molecular chaperones facilitate folding.

- 2024: Eric D. Siggia

For powerful theoretical approaches to the physics of life and incisive connections between theory and experiment, from the mechanics of DNA to the dynamics of genetic networks, and from noise in gene expression to pattern formation in embryos and populations of stem cells.

- 2023: Arup K. Chakraborty

For the leading role in initiating the field of computational immunology, aimed at applying approaches from physical sciences and engineering to unravel the mechanistic underpinnings of the adaptive immune response to pathogens, and to harness this understanding to help design vaccines and therapy.

- 2022: Terence Tai-Li Hwa

For developing quantitative studies that reveal fundamental constraints on bacterial physiology, and for formulating simple phenomenological theories that quantitatively predict bacterial responses to genetic and environmental changes.

- 2021: Andrea Cavagna, Irene Giardina

For the incisive combination of observation, analysis, and theory to elucidate the beautiful statistical physics problems underlying collective behavior in natural flocks and swarms.

- 2020: James Collins

For pioneering contributions at the interface of physics and biology, in particular the establishment of the field of synthetic biology and applications of statistical physics and nonlinear dynamics in biology and medicine.

- 2019: Jose Nelson Onuchic, Ken A. Dill

For independent contributions to a new view of protein folding, from the introduction and exploration of simple models, to detailed confrontations between theory and experiment.

- 2018: William S. Bialek, Princeton University

For the application of general theoretical principles of physics and information theory to help understand and predict how biological systems function across a variety of scales, from molecules and cells, to brains and animal collectives.

- 2017: Alan S. Perelson, Los Alamos National Laboratory

For profound contributions to theoretical immunology, which bring insight and save lives.

- 2016: Stephen R. Quake, Stanford University

For invention of large-scale microfluidic integration and its use to gain new insights into protein crystallography, transcription factor binding, and microbial ecology, and for seminal discoveries in single cell and single molecule genome analysis.

- 2015: Stanislas Leibler, Rockefeller University

For establishing the study of genetic network design principles as a foundation for the field of systems biology, and for pioneering work on the robustness of biological systems.

- 2014: Robert Austin
- 2012: William Eaton
- 2010: Xiaowei Zhuang
- 2008: Steven Block
- 2006: Alfred G. Redfield
- 2004: Peter Wolynes
- 2002: Carlos Bustamante
- 2000: Paul K. Hansma
- 1998: Rangaswamy Srinivasan
- 1996: Seiji Ogawa
- 1994: Robert Pearlstein, Robert S. Knox
- 1992: Hans Frauenfelder
- 1991: Watt W. Webb
- 1987: Britton Chance
- 1986: Hartmut Michel and Johann Deisenhofer
- 1985: John Hopfield
- 1984: Howard Berg and Edward Purcell
- 1983: Paul Lauterbur
- 1982: George Feher, Roderick Clayton

== See also ==
- List of biology awards
- List of physics awards
- List of prizes named after people
