= Kosyakov =

Kosyakov (Russian: Косяков), feminine: Kosyakova is a Russian surname. It may also be transliterated as Kossiakoff, Kossjakow, etc. Notable people with the surname include:

- Dmitriy Kosyakov
- Nikolay Kosyakov
- Vasily Kosyakov
