= Robert M. Stroud =

British biophysicist

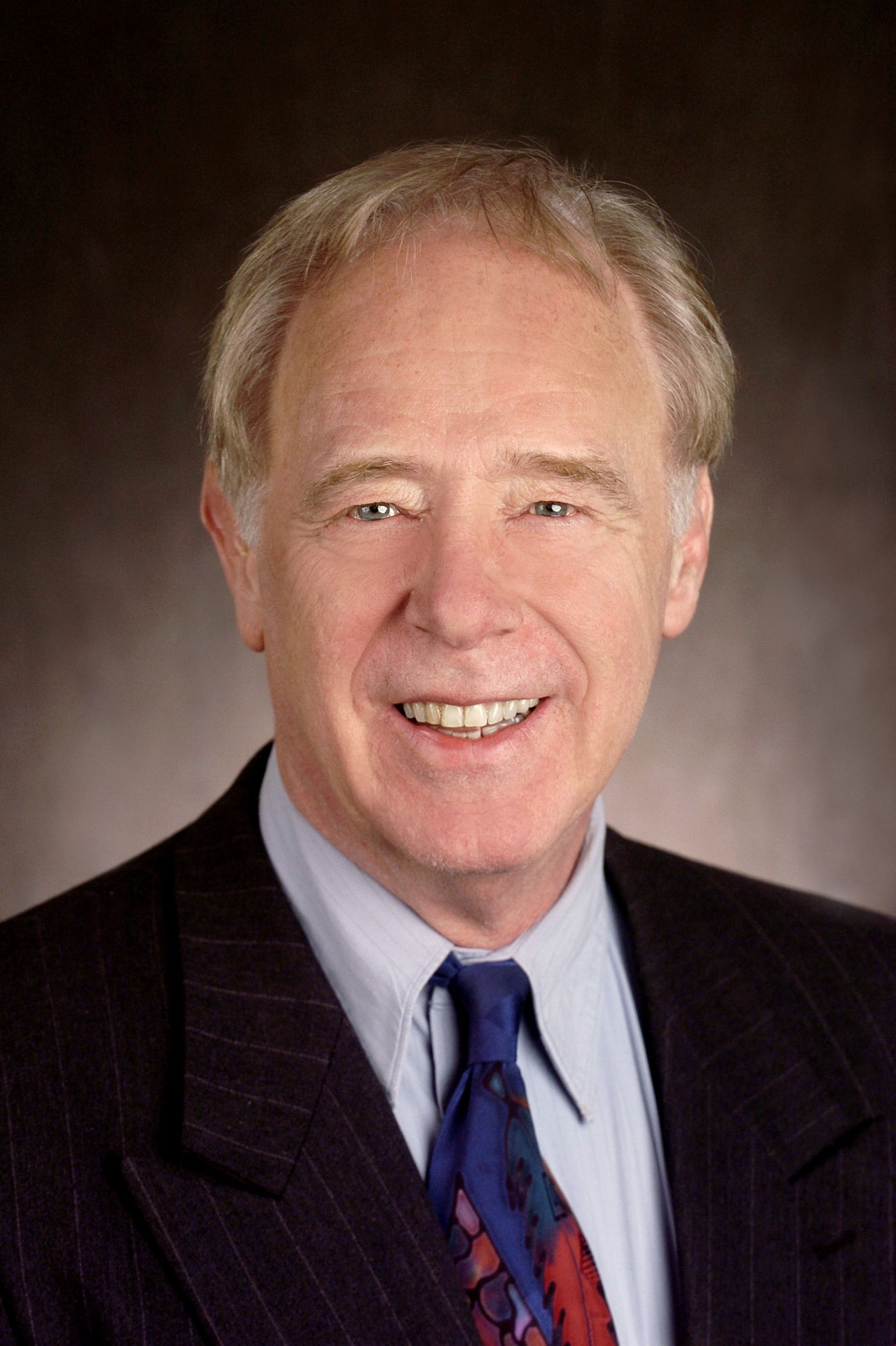
- Robert Stroud in 2006
- Born: 1942 (age 83–84); Stockport, England
- Citizenship: UK, USA
- Education: Clare College, Cambridge; Birkbeck, University of London
- Children: 2
- Scientific career
- Workplaces: California Institute of Technology; University of California, San Francisco
- Notable students: David Agard; Anthony Kossiakoff; Cynthia Wolberger; David Savage; Sun Hur; Bob Keenan
- Website: https://msg.ucsf.edu/people/robert-stroud-ma-phd

Robert Michael Stroud (born 1942) is a British biophysicist best known for his contributions to structural biology as means of determining the function of proteins, enzymes and integral membrane proteins. He was a professor of Chemistry at Caltech in the early 1970s and professor of Biochemistry and Biophysics, and of Pharmaceutical Chemistry at the University of California, San Francisco since 1976. He was elected to the National Academy of Sciences in 2003.

== Early life and education ==
Robert Michael Stroud was born in Stockport, England in 1942. He attended the Manchester Warehousemen and Clerks Orphan School (MWCOS) also known as Cheadle Hulme school from 1950-1961. He had an early interest in astronomy and would stargaze through his telescope in his garden. He worked with his father, an engineer, to design and build electronic devices. He attended University of Cambridge from 1961 where he studied in physics and mathematics, graduating in 1964. For his graduate studies he attended J.D.Bernal's laboratory at Birkbeck, University of London (1964-1968), where he occupied the desk that had been Rosalind Franklin's desk during her time as a researcher there. His thesis concerned defining the structures of lipoic acid, nucleosides and peptides. He discerned the crystal structure of the molecule tubercidin with non-centrosymmetric direct methods. He finished his PhD at Birkbeck in 1968.

== Career ==
After obtaining his PhD, he was offered a position at University of Oxford in the department headed by David Chilton Phillips, though the position's start date was to commence after a year. He undertook a postdoctoral appointment at California Institute of Technology (Caltech). He enjoyed Caltech and was appointed as an instructor and ultimately declined the position at Oxford. He became an assistant professor of chemistry in 1973, associate professor in 1975. In 1976 was hired at the University of California, San Francisco to help establish a program in structural biology. At UCSF he used the Pacific electric ray, a model organism, to research the acetylcholine receptor that enables rapid signaling in the nervous system. He went on to define the atomic and structural basis of transmembrane channels and transporters including the first for aquaporins, ammonia channels, and mechanisms for regulation of primary and secondary transporters, and ion conducting channels. He served as the editor of the Annual Review of Biophysics and Biomolecular Structure (now the Annual Review of Biophysics) from 1994 to 2003. Stroud has published over 360 publications in peer-reviewed journals.

== Awards and honors ==
Stroud was elected as a member of the National Academy of Sciences in 2003 in the Biophysics and Computational Biology section. He was the 3rd DeWitt Stetten Lecturer of the National Institutes of Health in 1984. He was elected President of the Biophysical Society of the US in 1988. In 1992 he was elected a Fellow of the Royal Society of Medicine UK. Stroud was elected Fellow of the New York Academy of Sciences in 1995. He was elected fellow of the American Academy of Arts and Sciences in 2007. He received the Hans Neurath Award of the Protein Society US in 2008, the Anatrace award of the Biophysical Society in 2009. In 2014 he was the 8th C.B.Anfinson Memorial Lecturer at the Weitzmann Institute. In 2015 he presented the Inaugural lecture, Indian Microbiology Society, New Delhi, India. In 2018 he was elected the UCSF Lecturer in Basic Science. In 2019 he was the Keynote speaker at the Annual Conference of the World Molecular Engineering Network, Cabo San Lucas Mexico.

== Personal life ==
Stroud is an avid windsurfer over four decades. He has an interest in music and playing stringed instruments; his father taught him how to play his first instrument, the banjo. He plays with bands including 'Robert Stroud and the Jailbirds', and 'The Twelve Pound Head'. While attending Cambridge University, Stroud competed in the Cambridge University swimming team and played on its water polo team. In 1990 he played with a water polo team winning a bronze medal in the Nike World Games.
