= Roderick Clayton =

American biophysicist (1922–2011)

Roderick K. Clayton
- Born: Roderick Keener Clayton; March 29, 1922; Tallinn, Estonia
- Died: October 23, 2011 (aged 89)
- Other name: Rod Clayton
- Education: California Institute of Technology
- Known for: Photosynthetic reaction centers Phototaxis in bacteria Bacterial photosynthesis
- Awards: Guggenheim Fellowship; Biological Physics Prize
- Scientific career
- Fields: Biophysics, photosynthesis
- Workplaces: Oak Ridge National Laboratory; Dartmouth College; Charles F. Kettering Research Laboratory; Cornell University
- Doctoral advisor: Max Delbrück

Roderick Keener Clayton (March 29, 1922 – October 23, 2011), known as Rod Clayton, was an American biophysicist known for his work on bacterial photosynthesis and photosynthetic reaction centers. He studied phototaxis in Rhodospirillum rubrum and later helped establish the concept, isolation, and spectroscopic characterization of bacterial photosynthetic reaction centers. He was elected to the National Academy of Sciences in 1977.

== Early life and education ==
Clayton was born in Tallinn, Estonia, on March 29, 1922, to John H. Clayton and Helena Mullerstein. His father was an American journalist working in Europe, and his mother was Estonian and worked at the American embassy in Tallinn. Clayton spent part of his childhood in Europe before his family moved to the United States when he was six years old. He later lived in the Chicago area and in Pasadena, California.

Clayton enrolled at the California Institute of Technology, where he initially studied chemistry. His studies were interrupted by World War II, during which he served in the United States Army Air Forces. He trained at Blytheville Army Airfield in Arkansas and was later posted to Guam, where he flew missions over Japan.

== Career ==
After completing his doctorate, Clayton worked with Cornelis Bernardus van Niel at Stanford University's Hopkins Marine Station. He then spent four years at the United States Naval Postgraduate School in Monterey, California, where he continued work on phototaxis, metabolism, and bacterial photosynthesis.

In 1958, Clayton joined the biological division of Oak Ridge National Laboratory, where he worked on phototrophic bacteria and began research that led to his later work on bacterial reaction centers. He moved to Dartmouth Medical School in 1961 and to the Charles F. Kettering Research Laboratory in Yellow Springs, Ohio, in 1962.

In 1966, Clayton joined Cornell University, where he held appointments in biological sciences and applied physics. He later became the Liberty Hyde Bailey Professor Emeritus in the Division of Plant Biology.

== Research ==
Clayton's early research focused on phototaxis in the photosynthetic bacterium Rhodospirillum rubrum. His doctoral and postdoctoral work examined the relationship between light, metabolism, and motility, including the response of bacteria to sudden changes in illumination.

At Oak Ridge and later at Dartmouth and the Kettering Research Laboratory, Clayton turned increasingly to bacterial photosynthesis. Working with carotenoid-deficient mutants of Rhodobacter sphaeroides, he identified spectroscopic changes associated with a specialized bacteriochlorophyll component involved in the primary reactions of photosynthesis. He used the term "photosynthetic reaction center" for the site of energy trapping and charge separation in bacterial photosynthesis.

Clayton's work contributed to the isolation and characterization of bacterial photosynthetic reaction centers. In the early 1970s, his laboratory and George Feher's laboratory independently purified minimal reaction center preparations from Rhodobacter sphaeroides.

Clayton's group also worked on the pigment composition, fluorescence properties, electron acceptors, and quantum efficiency of bacterial reaction centers. His later work included studies of fluorescence, energy transfer, and the organization of photosynthetic units. He also wrote books on the physical and chemical mechanisms of photosynthesis, including Light and Living Matter and Photosynthesis: Physical Mechanisms and Chemical Patterns.

== Honors and awards ==
Clayton was elected a fellow of the American Association for the Advancement of Science in 1965. He was elected to the American Academy of Arts and Sciences in 1975 and the National Academy of Sciences in 1977.

He received Guggenheim Fellowships in 1973 and 1980. In 1982, he and George Feher shared the first Biological Physics Prize of the American Physical Society, now known as the Max Delbruck Prize.

== Personal life ==
Clayton married Betty Jean Compton in 1944. They had a son and a daughter. Betty Jean Clayton worked with him in the laboratory for many years and helped maintain bacterial cultures used in his research.

After her death in 1981, Clayton's scientific career ended early, and Cornell negotiated his retirement in 1984. He later lived in California, where he pursued photography, ceramics, drawing, butterfly collecting, and work with service dogs. Clayton died on October 23, 2011, at the age of 89.
