= List of fellows of the Royal Society elected in 2007 =

Fellows of the Royal Society elected in 2007.

== Fellows ==
1. William Bradshaw Amos
2. Peter J. Barnes
3. Gillian Patricia Bates
4. Samuel Frank Berkovic
5. Michael James Bickle
6. Jeremy Bloxham
7. David Vernon Boger
8. Peter George Bruce
9. Michael Elmhirst Cates
10. Frederick Geoffrey Nethersole Cloke
11. Richard John Cogdell
12. Stewart Thomas Cole
13. George Coupland
14. George F. R. Ellis
15. Barry John Everitt
16. Andre Konstantin Geim
17. Siamon Gordon
18. Barbara Rosemary Grant
19. David Grahame Hardie
20. William Anthony Harris
21. Nicholas Higham
22. Anthony Arie Hyman
23. Anthony James Kinloch
24. Richard Leakey
25. Malcolm Harris Levitt
26. Ottoline Leyser
27. Paul Fredrick Linden
28. Peter Brent Littlewood
29. Ravinder Nath Maini
30. Robert James Mair
31. Michael Henry Malim
32. Andrew Paul McMahon
33. E. Richard Moxon
34. John Andrew Peacock
35. Edward Arend Perkins
36. Stephen Bailey Pope
37. Daniela Rhodes
38. Morgan Hwa-Tze Sheng
39. David Colin Sherrington
40. Terence Chi-Shen Tao
41. Veronica Van Heyningen
42. David Lee Wark
43. Trevor Dion Wooley
44. Andrew Peter Zisserman

== Foreign members ==
1. Wallace Smith Broecker
2. James Watson Cronin
3. Stanley Falkow
4. Tom Fenchel
5. Jeremiah Ostriker
6. Michael Oser Rabin
7. Gerald Mayer Rubin
8. Peter Guy Wolynes

== Honorary fellows ==
1. Onora O'Neill, Baroness O'Neill of Bengarve
