= Donald Crothers =

Donald Morris Crothers
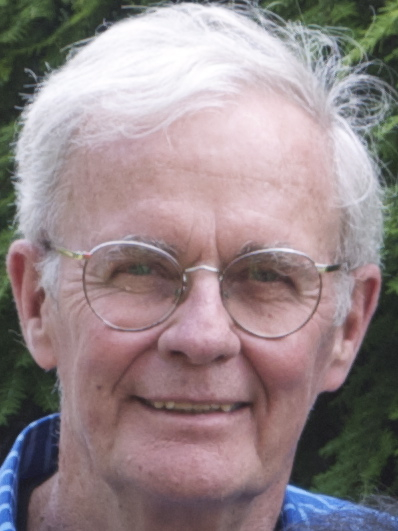
- Don Crothers, photographed 18 June 2011
- Born: January 28, 1937; Fatehgarh, India
- Died: March 16, 2014 (aged 77); New Haven, Connecticut
- Citizenship: American
- Education: Yale University; University of Cambridge; UCSD
- Known for: Nucleic acid structure and function
- Spouse: Leena Kareoja-Crothers
- Scientific career
- Fields: Chemistry
- Workplaces: Yale University
- Thesis: The denaturation of helical polynucleotides (1963)
- Doctoral advisor: Bruno Zimm

Donald Crothers (January 28, 1937 – March 16, 2014) was a professor of chemistry at Yale University in the United States. He was best known for his work on nucleic acid structure and function.

== Early life and education ==
Donald Crothers was the son of the late Morris King Crothers and Florence Kittredge Crothers. He graduated summa cum laude from Yale University in 1958 with a B.S. in Chemistry and earned a B.A. from the University of Cambridge in 1960. His study of Chemistry at Clare College, Cambridge was supported by a Mellon Fellowship. He received his Ph.D. in Chemistry from the University of California, San Diego, in 1963, working with Bruno Zimm.

As a Yale undergraduate, Crothers worked with Ignacio Tinoco, then a postdoctoral associate, in the laboratory of John Kirkwood. Along with Victor Bloomfield, Crothers and Tinoco later co-authored two books, including the 1974 text Physical Chemistry of Nucleic Acids, updated in 2000 as "Nucleic Acids: Structures, Properties, and Functions."

== Career ==
After a postdoctoral fellowship with Manfred Eigen at the Max-Planck-Institut in Göttingen, Germany, he returned to Yale University as a faculty member in the Department of Chemistry in 1964. Professor Crothers was named to an associate professorship in 1968, to a full professorship in 1971, and to the Alfred E. Kemp Professorship in Chemistry in 1985. He served four three-year terms as Chairman of the Yale Department of Chemistry (1975-1981; 1994-2000). At the time of his retirement in 2003, he was Sterling Professor of Chemistry and held a joint appointment in the Department of Molecular Biophysics and Biochemistry, of which he was a founding member.

After retiring from Yale, Crothers worked as a partner and scientific consultant for numerous biotechnology firms.

== Principal scientific accomplishments ==
Crothers was a co-inventor of the Zimm–Crothers viscometer. Among the most frequently cited papers from the Crothers lab is a method for the widely used electrophoretic mobility shift assay, better known as a "gel shift" assay, which is used to detect and estimate the affinity of protein-nucleic acid complexes. He made many other contributions to areas including the thermodynamics of secondary structure in RNA and DNA, the role of magnesium in RNA tertiary structure, DNA-drug interactions, sequence-directed and protein-induced DNA bending, DNA cyclization kinetics, RNA folding in riboswitches, protein-RNA structure, mechanisms of transcription, and nucleosome positioning.

== Awards and recognition ==
Professor Crothers was well known for insights into the structure and physical properties of nucleic acids. He won the Alexander von Humboldt Senior Scientist Award (1981), was named a fellow of the American Academy of Arts and Sciences (1986), and was elected to the National Academy of Sciences (1987). He was awarded the Emily M. Gray Award of the Biophysical Society (2008) for “significant contributions to education through creating rigorous, groundbreaking texts enriching generations of biophysicists,” an award which he shared with David Eisenberg of the University of California, Los Angeles. The two co-authored the 1979 text “Physical Chemistry with Applications to the Life Sciences,” which has become a standard textbook in the field.

== Personal life ==
Crothers was married to Leena Kareoja-Crothers, a pianist and musical educator originally from Finland, for 54 years. They had two daughters and four grandchildren.

== Books ==
- Physical Chemistry of Nucleic Acids (1st Ed) (1974) by Victor A. Bloomfield, Donald M. Crothers, Ignacio Tinoco. Published by Harper and Row (ISBN 0060407794).
- Physical Chemistry with Applications to the Life Sciences (1st Ed) (1979) by David Eisenberg and Donald Crothers. Published by Benjamin / Cummings Publishing Company (ISBN 978-0805324020).
- Nucleic Acids: Structures, Properties, and Functions (1st Ed) (2000) by Victor A. Bloomfield, Donald M. Crothers, Ignacio Tinoco. Published by University Science Books (ISBN 978-0935702491).
