= George Feher =

American chemist

- Born: Juraj Feher; 29 May 1924; Bratislava, Czechoslovakia (now Slovakia)
- Died: 28 November 2017 (aged 93); La Jolla, California, U.S.
- Education: University of California, Berkeley
- Spouse: Elsa Rosenvasser Feher
- Awards: Oliver E. Buckley Condensed Matter Prize (1976); Max Delbruck Prize (1982); Wolf Prize in Chemistry (2006/7)
- Scientific career
- Fields: Physics; Biophysics
- Workplaces: University of California, San Diego; Columbia University
- Doctoral advisor: Arthur F. Kip

George Feher (29 May 1924 – 28 November 2017) was an American biophysicist working at the University of California San Diego.

== Birth and education ==
Juraj Feher was born in Bratislava, Czechoslovakia in 1924. As a teenager, interested in electronics and crystals, he made experiments and grew crystals in his house. In 1938 he was expelled from school as a Jew, a year before the Nazis came in and the slovak state was established. In 1941 he made his way overland to Israel (then called Palestine) with a group of other teenagers. After being released from a brief internment in a British camp, he joined a kibbutz for a year and a half and later moved to Haifa, where his sister lived. In Haifa he worked as radio repairman while taking technical courses. He was offered by one of his teachers, Franz Ollendorff, to be his lab assistant. One of his first challenges was to build the Technion's first oscilloscope, for which he claimed the beam swept right-to-left, in a nod to its Hebrew heritage. In addition to those two occupations, He worked for the Haganah as electronics expert-one of his tasks dealt with tapping the direct line between the British High Commissioner in Jerusalem and 10 Downing Street in London and building Descrambler device. During his time in Israel he read Erwin Schrödinger's What Is Life? which made him interested in biophysics.

In 1944 Feher tried to apply for the Technion but he could not be accepted since he did not graduate high school and due to lack of knowledge of the Bible. With the encouragement of Ollendorff (promising that a US organization called "The Friends of the Technion" would support Feher's studies), he applied for 50 universities in the US, and only two were willing to accept him. He could not afford the voyage to US so he started a small production line for devices with piezoelectric crystals, mainly microphones. In December 1946 he arrived to New York, where he realized that "Friends of the Technion" would not fund his degree.

With poor means he attended the University of California, Berkeley, where he received his bachelor's degree in engineering physics (1950), master's degree in electrical engineering (1951) and doctorate (1954).

== Academic career ==
After completing his PhD, he worked as a physicist at Bell Laboratories and Columbia University. In 1960, he became a professor of physics at University of California San Diego. Feher died in 2017, aged 93.

== Research ==
His main research was to uncover the basic mechanisms for how plants and bacteria use photosynthesis to convert light into chemical energy. In 1971, Feher's laboratory and Roderick Clayton's laboratory independently purified minimal bacterial photosynthetic reaction center preparations from Rhodobacter sphaeroides.

Feher's main contributions to science were the development of spectroscopic tools and their applications, in particular, to problems in biochemistry and biophysics. He was the first to develop a form of double-frequency spectroscopy, Electron nuclear double resonance (ENDOR), for which he chose a name reminiscent of the biblical witch of Endor. This was the forerunner of many other double-resonance methods.

== Wolf Prize ==
In 2006/07, he was awarded the Wolf Prize in Chemistry along with Ada Yonath of Weizmann Institute of Science in Rehovot, Israel for "ingenious structural discoveries of the ribosomal machinery of peptide-bond formation and the light-driven primary processes in photosynthesis".
