= Ignacio Tinoco Jr. =

- Born: November 22, 1930
- Died: November 15, 2016 (aged 85)
- Education: University of New Mexico, University of Wisconsin, Madison, Yale University
- Known for: Pioneering work on RNA folding and the secondary structures of ribonucleic acid
- Scientific career
- Fields: Chemistry
- Institutions: University of California, Berkeley, Lawrence Berkeley National Laboratory
- Doctoral advisor: John D. Ferry
- Other academic advisors: John G. Kirkwood
- Doctoral students: Carlos Bustamante, Charles Cantor
- Other notable students: Frances Arnold

Ignacio "Nacho" Tinoco Jr. (November 22, 1930 – November 15, 2016) was a Professor of Chemistry at the University of California, Berkeley from 1956 to 2016.

Ignacio Tinoco received a bachelor's degree from the University of New Mexico in 1951, and a Ph.D. in physical chemistry at the University of Wisconsin, Madison in 1954. He was a postdoctoral fellow with John G. Kirkwood at Yale University from 1954 to 1956. He joined the University of California, Berkeley as a faculty member in 1956, where he was professor in the graduate school and a faculty senior scientist, physical biosciences division, Lawrence Berkeley National Laboratory. He was chairman of the chemistry department (1979–82).

Tinoco, together with Carlos Bustamante (biophysicist) and Marcos F. Maestre, developed the theory of circular intensity differential scattering (CIDS), showing that the angular differential scattering of left- and right-circularly polarized light can provide information about the geometry and handedness of helical structures. In 1982, Tinoco and collaborators experimentally demonstrated angular CIDS from the helical sperm head of the octopus Eledone cirrhosa, observing preferential scattering of one circular polarization with a maximum differential signal of about 2% at a scattering angle of 35°.

He is known for his pioneering work on RNA folding and the secondary structures of ribonucleic acid. His graduate and postdoctoral students include Carlos Bustamante and Frances Arnold.

His honors and awards include: Guggenheim Fellow, Medical Research Council Laboratory, Cambridge (1964); California Section Award, American Chemical Society (1965); D.Sc. University of New Mexico (1972); Member, National Academy of Sciences (1985); Elisabeth R. Cole Award (Founders Award), Biophysical Society (1996); Berkeley Citation, University of California (1996); Member, American Academy of Arts and Sciences (2001); Emily M. Gray Award, Biophysical Society (2006); Fellow: American Physical Society, Biophysical Society.

He died on November 15, 2016, at the age of 85.

The Biophysical Society gives the Ignacio Tinoco Award in his honor.
