= Donald Engelman =

Donald Max Engelman
- Alma mater: Yale University; King's College London; Reed College
- Occupation: Biochemist, biophysicist, university teacher, scientist
- Employer: Yale University (1970–)
- Awards: Guggenheim Fellowship (1978); Fellow of the American Association for the Advancement of Science (2021)
- Website: medicine.yale.edu/lab/engelman/
- Born: 1941 (age 83–84)
- Education: Reed College, Yale University
- Awards: Guggenheim fellow
- Scientific career
- Fields: Cancer drugs and treatments
- Institutions: Yale University
- Thesis: Solubilization and Aggregation Properties of Membrane Components from Mycoplasma laidlawii (1968)
- Doctoral students: Mark A. Lemmon

Donald Max Engelman (born 1941) is Higgins Professor of Biochemistry at Yale University. He is a member of the National Academy of Sciences (1997), fellow of the American Academy of Arts and Sciences, a fellow of the National Institutes of Health, and has been a Guggenheim fellow. He served as the editor of the Annual Review of Biophysics and Biophysical Chemistry (1984–1993).

He is a director of the Stryker Corporation. He is involved in the creation of new cancer drugs and treatments. For example, Engelman is involved in research to use peptides to aid in destroying tumors.

== Administration, advising, and consulting ==
Engelman has served as Director of Biological Sciences at Yale, an advisor to the Brookhaven National Laboratory, and a consultant to the Los Alamos National Laboratory. He also served as Acting Dean of Yale College in 1991.

== Education ==
Engelman is a graduate (and trustee) of Reed College receiving his degree in physics. He then earned his Ph.D. in molecular biophysics at Yale University in 1969.

== Engelman Lab ==
Engelman directs the Engelman Laboratory at Yale focused on the biophysics of biological membranes. His group is best known for elucidating the mechanism of pH Low Insertion Peptide (pHLIP) to form trans-membrane helices.

== Patents ==
Engelman holds six United States patents for his discoveries.
