= Alexander Kossiakoff =

Russian-American engineer (1914–2005)

- Born: June 26, 1914; Saint Petersburg, Russian Empire
- Died: August 6, 2005 (aged 91)
- Citizenship: United States (after 1930)
- Education: California Institute of Technology; Johns Hopkins University
- Spouse: Arabelle Davies (m. 1939)
- Children: 2
- Scientific career
- Fields: System Engineering
- Workplaces: Johns Hopkins University Applied Physics Laboratory
- Doctoral advisor: Francis O. Rice and David Harker
- Other academic advisors: Linus Pauling

Alexander "Kossy" Kossiakoff (June 26, 1914 – August 6, 2005) was a system engineer and the former director of the Johns Hopkins University Applied Physics Laboratory. He was best known for his contributions in the development of guided missile systems and systems engineering education.

== Early life and education ==
Kossiakoff was born in St. Petersburg as the only child of Ivan Timothy and Ludmilla (Brodskaya) Kossiakoff. His father, an army officer who served in World War I, fled to Harbin, Manchuria and later Hankou before emigrating to Seattle in 1923. Kossiakoff became an American citizen in 1930. Kossiakoff earned his Bachelor of Science in chemistry from the California Institute of Technology in 1936 and his Ph.D. from The Johns Hopkins University with Francis O. Rice and David Harker. He returned to California Institute of Technology as a postdoctoral fellow with Linus Pauling.

== Career and research ==
Kossiakoff briefly taught at the Catholic University of America in 1939. During that time, he served as a technical aide for the rocket development Section H with Clarence N. Hickman of the National Defense Research Committee. He left in 1943 to serve as the deputy director of Research to establish the Allegany Ballistics Laboratory where he worked on the development of solid propellant rockets.

In 1946, he joined the Applied Physics Laboratory and led Operation Bumblebee which worked on the development of the Terrier, Tartar and Talos shipboard radar-guided supersonic surface-to-air missiles as the assistant director for technical operations from 1948 to 1961. He served as laboratory director from 1969 to 1980. During that period, the APL worked on the development of the Polaris missile and Trident ballistic missiles, and the Aegis Ballistic Missile Defense System. Kossiakoff was also instrumental in transitioning the APL from its status as a Federally Funded Research and Development Centers to a University Affiliated Research Center. After stepping down, he served as Lab's Chief Scientist until his death. During that time, he served as a program chair for technical management and systems engineering and build up the Whiting School of Engineering’s Engineering Programs for Professionals. The Kossiakoff Conference and Education Center on the APL campus was dedicated to Kossiakoff.

== Personal life and death ==
Kossiakof married Arabelle Davies in 1939 for 66 years and had a daughter and son. Anthony Kossiakoff is a professor of biochemistry at University of Chicago.

Kossiakoff died on August 6, 2005 due to congestive heart failure.

== Notable Awards ==
- Presidential Certificate of Merit 1948
- Navy Distinguished Public Service Award 1958
- Department of Defense Medal for Distinguished Public Service 1981
- Johns Hopkins University President's Medal 2004
