= Vasanthi Jayaraman =

Professor of molecular biology

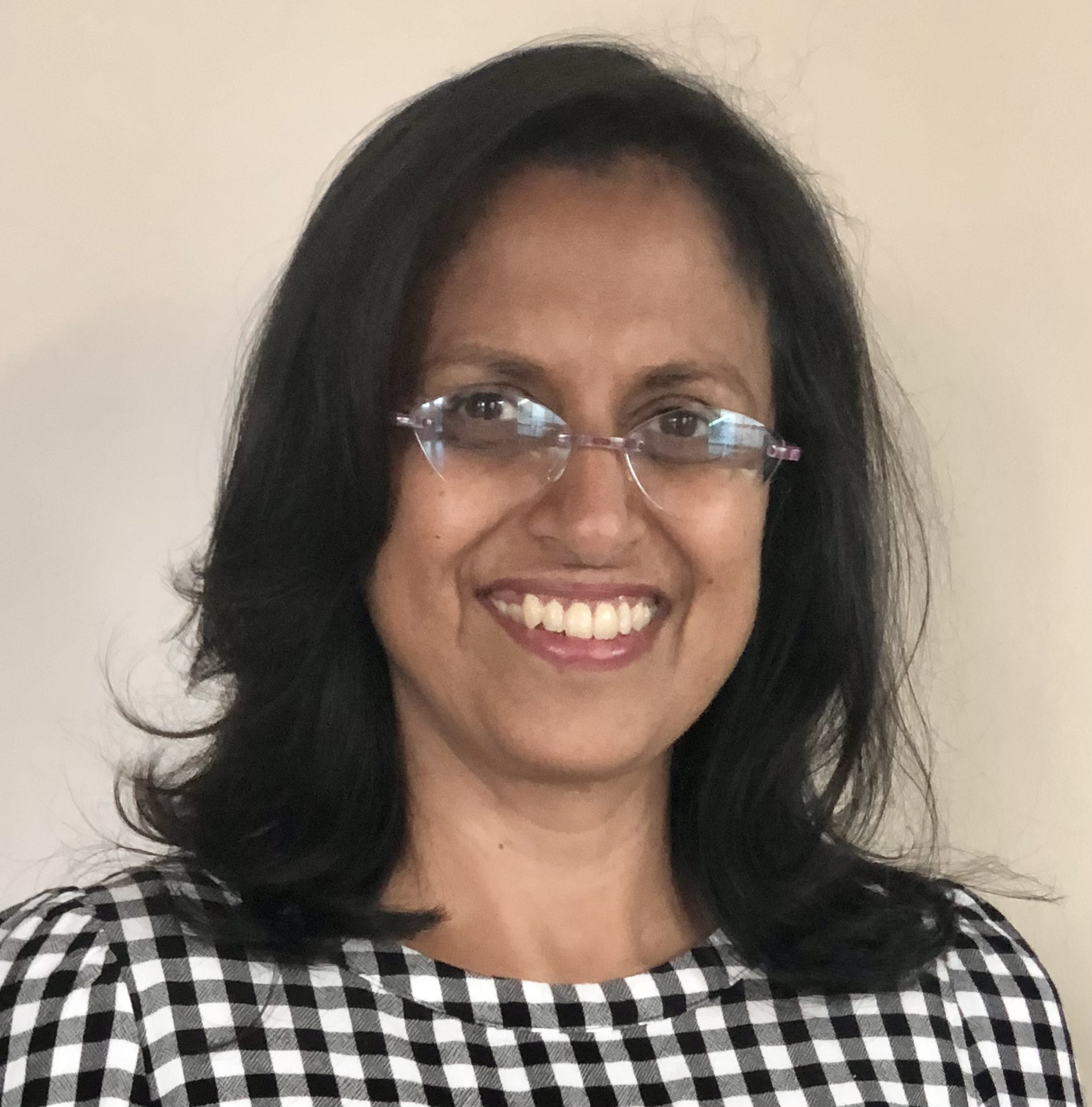

Vasanthi Jayaraman is a professor of molecular biology in the department of biochemistry and molecular biology at the McGovern Medical School.

== Background ==
Jayaraman was born in India. In 1988, she received her B.S. from Meenakshi College, Madras University, in Chennai, India, and her M.S. in 1990 from Indian Institute of Technology in Chennai, India. She received her Ph.D. from Princeton University in Princeton, New Jersey, in 1995. For her doctoral work, Jayaraman explored the allosteric mechanism of hemoglobin under the mentorship of Thomas G. Spiro.

From 1995 to 1997, Jayaraman worked as a postdoctoral fellow at Cornell University in Ithaca, New York under George Paul Hess. For her postdoctoral work, she used caged compounds to study sub-millisecond kinetics of ligand gated ion channels. During this time, Jayaraman's work was funded by a Fellowship from the Cancer Research Fund of the Damon Runyon-Walter Winchell Foundation.

== Career and research ==
Jayaraman received her first academic appointment as an assistant professor in the department of chemistry at Marquette University in Milwaukee, Wisconsin, in 1997. Since 2002, she has worked at the McGovern Medical School (UTHealth) in Houston, Texas. During her time at UTHealth, Jayaraman has held positions as an assistant (2002–2006) and associate professor (2006–2007) in the department of integrative biology. From 2007 to 2012, Jayaraman was an associate professor in the department of biochemistry and molecular biology. As of 2012, she holds the title of professor in that same department. As of 2022, Jayaraman will hold the position of editor-in-chief for Biophysical Journal; she is currently an associate editor for the same journal.

== Research ==
Jayaraman's current research focuses on the structure and function of ligand-gated ion channels. She uses spectroscopy and imaging methods to understand the role of conformational dynamics in mediating function by agonists, and understanding the fine-tuning of the function of the proteins by small molecule modulators and accessory proteins.

== Awards ==
- Dean's Teaching Excellence Award, McGovern Medical School, Houston, Texas, in years 2005, 2010, 2011, 2014, 2015, 2016, 2017, 2018, 2019, 2020, and 2021
- 2020 – Oldham Faculty Award Recipient
- 2018 – Women Faculty Forum Research Excellence Award, McGovern Medical School, Houston, Texas
- 2017 – UT System Regents Teaching Award, TX

== Personal life ==
Jayaraman is married to Ramanan Krishnamoorti, chief energy officer and professor, University of Houston, Houston, Texas. They have two children.
