= Eric Gouaux =

American biochemist and biophysicist

- Born: James Eric Gouaux
- Education: Harvard University
- Awards: W. Alden Spencer Award (2013)
- Scientific career
- Fields: Biochemistry, biophysics, structural biology
- Workplaces: Vollum Institute, Oregon Health & Science University
- Thesis: Crystallographic studies of aspartate carbamoyltransferase (1989)
- Doctoral advisor: William Lipscomb
- Website: https://www.ohsu.edu/vollum-institute/eric-gouaux-phd

Eric Gouaux is an American biochemist and biophysicist who holds the Jennifer and Bernard Lacroute Term Chair at the Vollum Institute at the Oregon Health & Science University.

== Education ==
Gouaux studied chemistry at Harvard University, from which he received both his B.A. in 1984 and his Ph.D. in 1989 with William Lipscomb. He remained in Cambridge as a postdoctoral fellow, first at Harvard and then at the Massachusetts Institute of Technology.

== Academic career ==
Gouaux joined the faculty of the University of Chicago in 1993. Three years later, he moved to Columbia University, where he became a full professor in 2001. He moved to the Vollum Institute at the Oregon Health & Science University in 2005 and was appointed the Jennifer and Bernard Lacroute Endowed Chair in Neuroscience Research in 2015.

Gouaux was a recipient of the Searle Scholars Program award in 1994 and became a Howard Hughes Medical Institute Investigator in 2000. He was elected to the United States National Academy of Sciences in 2010 and the United States National Academy of Medicine in 2020.

== Research ==
Research in Gouaux's laboratory focuses on the molecular biochemistry of chemical synapses, particularly on the structures of proteins such as receptors and ion channels and on their response to neurotransmitters. His research group uses structural biology techniques such as X-ray crystallography and cryo-electron microscopy, as well as electrophysiology. In 2018, Gouaux became the principal investigator for a new cryo-electron microscopy center hosted by OHSU and the Pacific Northwest National Laboratory, one of three such centers financed by the National Institutes of Health.
