= Yves De Koninck =

Canadian neurobiologist

- Born: February 18, 1964 (age 61); South-Bend, Indiana, USA
- Occupations: Neuroscientist, Professor of Psychiatry and Neuroscience at Université Laval
- Known for: Pain research, transdisciplinary research
- Awards: Fellow of the Canadian Academy of Health Sciences, Fellow of the Royal Society of Canada, Honorary Doctorate from Université de Montréal, Canada Research Chair in Chronic Pain and Related Brain Disorders, Prix Jacques-Rousseau ACFAS 2013
- Website: http://ydklab.org

Yves De Koninck, FCAHS, FRSC, (born February 18, 1964) is a neuroscientist and Professor of Psychiatry and Neuroscience at Université Laval and Adjunct Professor of Pharmacology and Therapeutics at McGill University.

== Biography ==
Yves De Koninck comes from a large family of intellectuals and scholars. He is the son of philosopher Thomas De Koninck, and nephew of Joseph De Koninck, Professor Emeritus at the Brain and Mind Research Institute of the University of Ottawa. He has two brothers: Paul De Koninck is Professor of Biochemistry, Microbiology and Bio-Informatics at Université Laval and a neuroscientist, and Marc De Koninck, a social worker and community organizer.

=== Positions ===
- Scientific Director of the Institut universitaire en santé mentale de Québec
- Director of Research of the Centre intégré universitaire de santé et de services sociaux de la Capitale-Nationale (CIUSSS-CN)
- Founder and Director of the Neurophotonics Centre
- Canada Research Chair in Chronic Pain and Related Brain Disorders (Tier 1)
- Co-scientific director of Sentinel North

== Scientific contributions ==
=== Mechanisms underlying neuropathic pain ===
His most cited publications are two articles in the scientific journal Nature – together these two publications were cited over 1600 times in 2015. In a 2003 Nature publication, De Koninck and his team showed that pain hypersensitivity in people suffering from neuropathic pain could be due to a reversal of the mechanisms that suppress pain signals in the spinal cord. The discovery of this mechanism explaining neuropathic pain was highlighted as one of the top 10 discoveries of 2003 by the magazine Québec Science. Jeffrey Coull, first author of the publication, received the Brain Star of the year award for his work from the Canadian Institutes of Health Research – Institute of Neuroscience, Mental Health & Addiction. The discovery that the protein called brain-derived neurotrophic factor (BDNF) is involved in the neuroimmune interactions underlying chronic pain is listed as one of the milestones in Canadian Health Research by the Canadian Institutes of Health Research. This work was published in Nature in 2005.

In 2013, the De Koninck team reported the identification of a compound that restored the function of a protein called KCC2, and alleviated pain hypersensitivity in an experimental model of neuropathic pain, suggesting compounds of the kind could be used as novel therapeutics for chronic pain and other neurological diseases in which KCC2 function is disrupted, including epilepsy, motor spasticity, stress, anxiety, schizophrenia, and morphine-induced hyperalgesia. Marc Bergeron received a CIHR Brain Star Award for this publication.

Another study, published in the journal Brain in 2013 further highlighted the importance of the KCC2 protein in neuropathic pain, as blocking this protein replicated the effect of nerve injury and reduced the threshold for transmission of painful stimuli, a hallmark of allodynia. Restoring KCC2 function in experimental models with nerve injury conversely restored the threshold. Guillaume Lavertu, first author of this publication, received an Étudiant-chercheur étoile award for this work.

Also in 2013 work from the De Koninck laboratory showed mechanisms similar to those involved in neuropathic pain signaling could be involved in morphine-induced hyperalgesia. This research explained why morphine can paradoxically cause pain, and showed that the mechanisms underlying pain hypersensitivity are distinct from those causing morphine tolerance. This discovery was highlighted as one of the top ten discoveries of 2013 by Québec Science Magazine, and co-first authors Francesco Ferrini and Tuan Trang received 2013 CIHR Brain Star awards for this publication.

Yves De Koninck's work showing how a dysregulation of chloride ion transport is involved in chronic pain and other brain disorders, and the discovery of a compound that can act therapeutically for these disorders was selected as one of the breakthroughs of the year by Le Soleil newspaper.

In 2014, a study published in Nature Neuroscience showed that pain hypersensitivity could be reversed after being reactivated, in a process similar to memory reconsolidation. Robert Bonin was named étudiant chercheur étoile of the month of March 2015 for this publication, and received the CIHR-INMHA Brain Star of the year Award for this publication.

=== Development of optogenetic tools to study neurons ===
The development of a novel probe, capable of recording neuron activity, but also of emitting light to activate cells using optogenetic approaches was highlighted as one of the discoveries of the year for 2011 by Québec Science.

=== Neuronal changes associated with aging ===
Work done by Cyril Bories, in the De Koninck laboratory, revealed neurobiological differences in the balance of excitatory and inhibitory signals in the brains of aging rats that could be correlated to alterations in cognitive functions. Cyril Bories received an Age Plus Prize from the Canadian Institutes of Health Research institute of Aging for this publication.

== Awards ==
- 2022: Wilder Penfield Award, Prix du Québec
- 2020: Award for Education in Neuroscience, Society for Neuroscience
- 2019: Emily M. Gray Award, Biophysical Society
- 2018: Brockhouse Canada Prize for Interdisciplinary Research in Science and Engineering (team award)
- 2017: Distinguished Career Award, Canadian Pain Society
- 2016: Canada Research Chair in Chronic Pain and Related Brain Disorders (Tier 1)
- 2015: Fellow of the Royal Society of Canada
- 2015: Honorary Doctorate, Université de Montréal
- 2014: Barbara Turnbull Award for spinal cord research, Barbara Turnbull Foundation, CIHR and Brain Canada
- 2013: Top 10 discoveries of the year, Québec Science magazine
- 2013: Jacques-Rousseau Prize (multidisciplinarity), Association francophone pour le savoir
- 2013: Fellow Canadian Academy of Health Sciences
- 2013: Top 10 discoveries of the year, Le Soleil
- 2013: Personality of the week, La Presse/Radio-Canada
- 2013: Molecular Pain Award, Association for the Study of Neurons and Diseases
- 2013: Researcher of the Month, Canadians for Medical Research
- 2012: Personality of the week, Le Soleil / Radio Canada
- 2011: Top 10 discoveries of the year, Québec Science magazine
- 2004: Top 10 discoveries of the year, Québec Science magazine
- 2001: Young Investigator Award, Canadian Pain Society
