= Peter Wright (scientist) =

New Zealand scientist

- Born: Peter Edwin Wright; New Zealand
- Education: University of Auckland
- Spouse: Jane Dyson
- Scientific career
- Fields: Biophysics
- Workplaces: Scripps Research; University of Sydney
- Thesis: Physico-chemical properties of metal ion sites in cuproproteins: an investigation of selected copper(II) complexes (1972)
- Website: www.scripps.edu/faculty/wright

Peter Edwin Wright is a scientist, an NMR spectroscopist and a professor at the Scripps Research Institute. He served as editor-in-chief of the Journal of Molecular Biology for 33 years.

== Education and early life ==
Wright is from New Zealand and studied at the University of Auckland. He graduated in 1968 with a Bachelor of Science degree followed by a Master of Science degree in 1969.

He completed his PhD in chemistry in 1972 with a thesis on the physico-chemical properties of metal ion sites in cuproproteins: an investigation of selected copper(II) complexes.

== Career and research ==
From 1976 to 1984, Wright was employed by the University of Sydney. Since 1984, he has been employed at the Scripps Research Institute.

Wright is a proponent of the theory of conformational sampling being of importance to enzyme catalysis and intrinsically disordered proteins, which is opposed to the theory of electrostatic preorganization.

== Personal life ==
Wright is married to Jane Dyson.
