= Karolin Luger =

Austrian-American biochemist and biophysicist

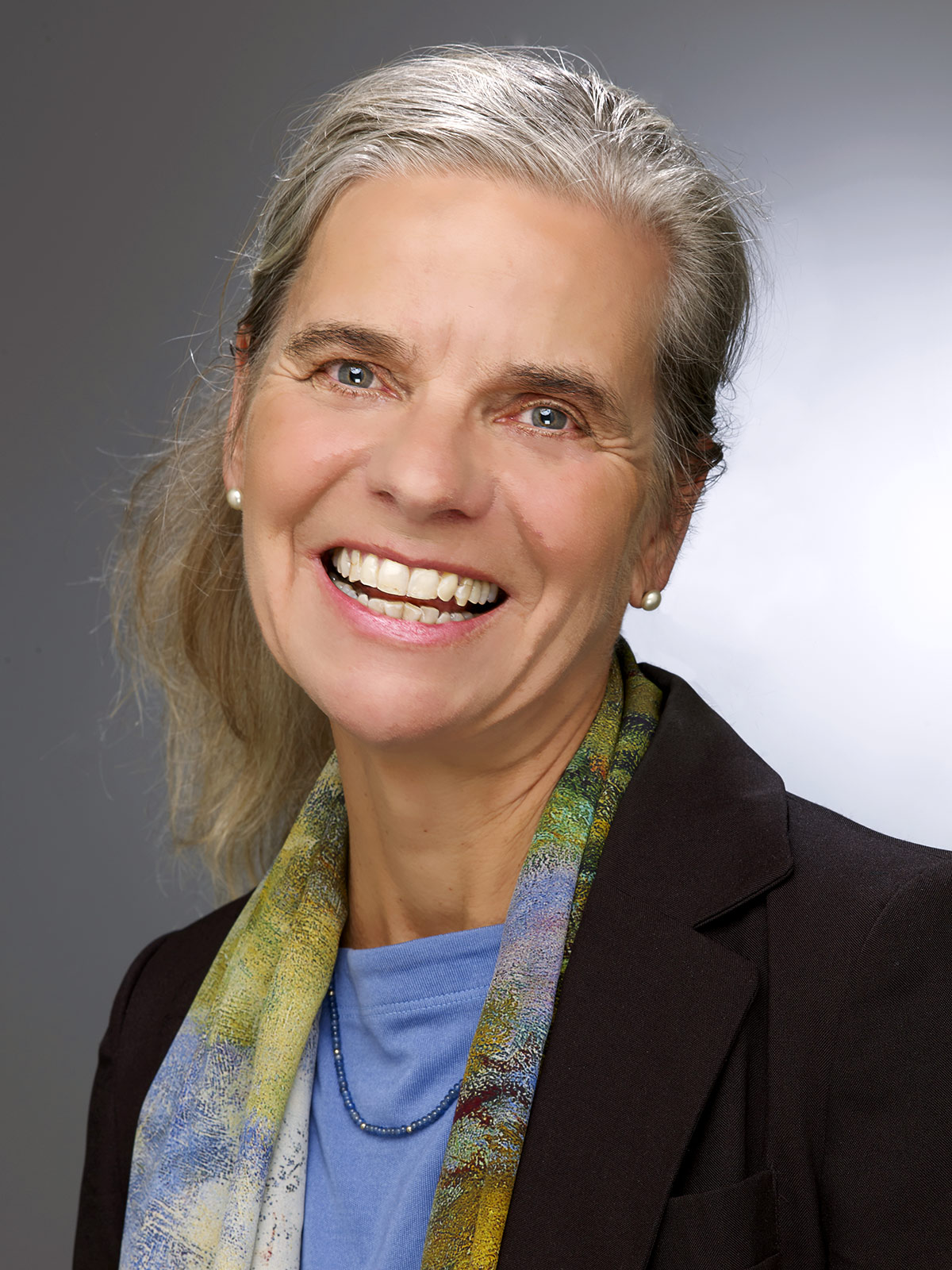
- Citizenship: Austria, USA
- Education: University of Basel
- Known for: Discovering the three-dimensional structure of chromatin
- Awards: Vorarlberg Science Prize, Searle Scholar Award, World Laureates Association Prize
- Scientific career
- Fields: biochemistry, biophysics
- Workplaces: Swiss Federal Institute of Technology, Colorado State University, University of Colorado, Howard Hughes Medical Institute
- Website: www.lugerlab.org

Karolin Luger is an Austrian-American biochemist and biophysicist known for her work with nucleosomes and discovery of the three-dimensional structure of chromatin. She is a Distinguished Professor at the University of Colorado Boulder in the Biochemistry Department.

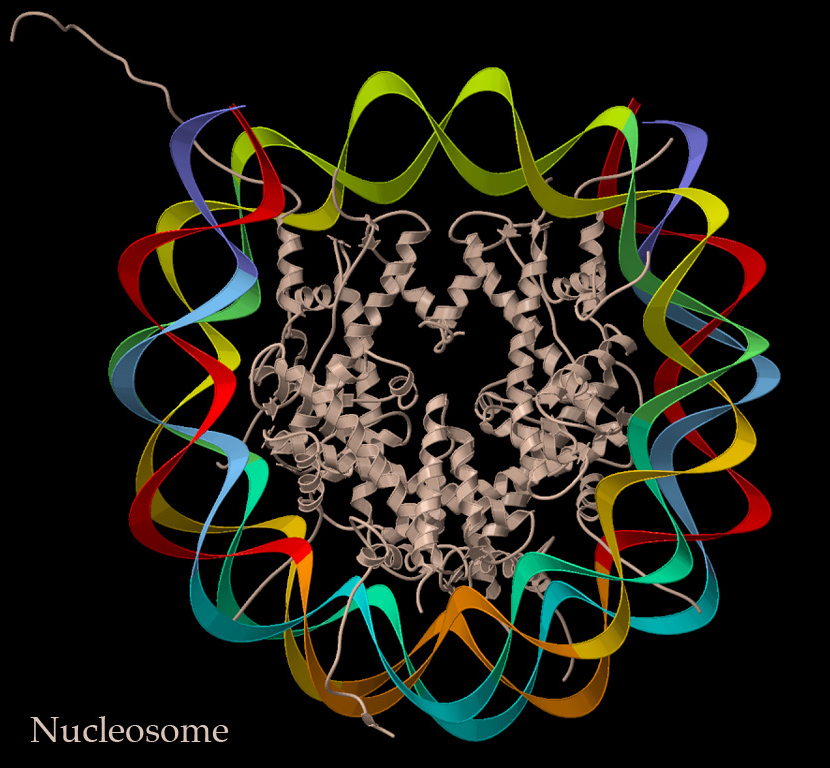
3D nucleosome structure, histone proteins in center, DNA around outside

== Life ==
Luger was born the youngest child after several brothers. Though not interested in mathematics, electronics, or physics, as her brothers were, she became fascinated with biology. She has stated that she chose a career in science during middle school, when she realized that "not everything was 'known' yet". As a young woman in Austria, Luger attended a gymnasium where she specialized in foreign languages.

Luger is married and has one daughter.

== Education ==
Luger earned a Bachelor of Science in microbiology and a Master of Science in biochemistry from the University of Innsbruck. She completed her Ph.D in biochemistry and biophysics at the University of Basel.

== Career ==
In 1997, as a postdoc with Timothy J Richmond, Luger was first author on the paper that described the first structure determined for the nucleosome. The structure was discovered by X-ray crystallography. She also proposed that histone-DNA bonds are weaker at points where less of the histone contacts the DNA, which was confirmed by Michelle Wang in a 2009 paper. After several years at the Swiss Federal Institute of Technology, Luger was hired by Colorado State University in 1999. Her work there includes extensive further research on the nucleosome's three-dimensional structure. The nucleosome, a building block of the chromatin genetic material that makes up chromosomes, consists of DNA wrapped around a disk of proteins. In 2005, Luger and Kenneth Kaye used X-ray crystallography to determine the mechanism that the virus causing Kaposi's sarcoma, a cancer that affects subdermal connective tissue, uses to spread. The virus attaches to chromatin and inserts its genetic material, which is then copied along with the cell's DNA. Luger and Kaye thus showed that a virus can attach to chromatin as a "docking platform".

Since 2010, Luger has done significant studies of histones, researching the connection between their chaperone proteins and acetylation, as well as variant structures. Histones are important in the process of gene expression, and their positioning as determined by chaperone proteins is essential to that role. The chaperones also can change the conformation of the nucleosome as a whole. Modifications to histones, including acetylation, methylation, and phosphorylation, are important because of their role in activating and deactivating genes. In 2008, Luger published a study that showed that physical changes to the nucleosome do not occur when DNA is methylated. Luger's research as of 2012 also comprises several other areas of study with chromatin, including the processes of DNA replication, transcription, recombination, and repair in chromatin. She and her research group have also developed various assays for examining chromatin structure, to augment traditional X-ray crystallography. Another related research interest for Luger's research group is the genetic cause of Rett syndrome, the gene MECP2. The gene codes for a protein that binds to methyl groups on chromatin, altering its conformation.

=== Honors ===
Luger has received many honors throughout her career. She was the recipient of the Searle Scholar Award in 1999, her first year as a professor at Colorado State University. In 2003, she was named a Monfort Professor and awarded $75,000 a year for two years in research funds by the university. Two years later, Luger was appointed as an investigator at the Howard Hughes Medical Institute. In 2007 she received the State Science Prize of Vorarlberg Austria. From 2008 to 2012, Luger sat on the National Institute of General Medical Sciences' advisory board.

She has also received several prestigious grants throughout her career, including a 5-year award from the National Institute of Health and a $1.2 million grant from the W. M. Keck Foundation.

In 2007, Luger was named CSU University Distinguished Professor

In 2012, Luger was chosen to be the National Lecturer for the Biophysical Society's 2013 meeting.

In 2014, Luger was named 2014 Fellow Of The Biophysical Society

In 2017, Luger has been selected to the American Academy of Arts and Sciences.

In 2018, Luger was elected to the National Academy of Sciences.

In 2023, Luger was named a CU distinguished Professor

In 2023, Luger, Rhodes and Richmond were awarded the World Laureates Association Prize for elucidating the structure of the nucleosome at the atomic level
