= Vollum Institute =

Coordinates: 45.50072°N 122.68749°W

- Established: 1987
- Faculty: 23
- Staff: 180
- Location: Portland, Oregon, USA
- Interactive map of Vollum Institute
- Website: https://www.ohsu.edu/xd/research/centers-institutes/vollum/

The Vollum Institute is an independent research institute located in Marquam Hill Campus of the Oregon Health and Science University (OHSU) in southwest Portland, Oregon, USA. The institute is closely affiliated with the School of Medicine and many other the universities nearby.

== Establishment ==
The institute was founded in 1987, and is a privately endowed organization named after Howard Vollum, a pioneer in the development of oscilloscopes and the co-founder of Tektronix. The research support for the faculty comes from the National Institutes of Health, federally sponsored programs, and also from the private funds of the Howard Hughes Medical Institute and the endowment created by Howard Vollum, which is controlled by the Oregon Health and Science University Foundation.

The institute's building was designed by Robert Frasca of Zimmer-Gunsul-Frasca, and the 67,000 square foot structure was completed in 1987. In 1988, the institute received the Laboratory of the Year award from the Research and Development magazine.

== Mission ==
There are currently 23 faculty scientists, 180 research staffs, postdoctoral fellows and graduate students. The scientists of the institute are doing research on chemicals; glutamate, dopamine mediate neuronal communication, studying how brain function is disrupted in diseases like epilepsy, sound is produced in electrical signals in hearing pathways, proteins signal govern cell death development, and the reason why the synaptic connections between neurons grows stronger or weaker. They also study how the psychiatric drugs and drug abuse meditate therapeutic and actions that are actually harmful.

== Research ==
In 2013, the Vollum Institute research gave a new insight on how anti-depressants work in the brain by publishing two papers on neurotransmission which was one of the issue in Nature, focusing on the structure of the dopamine transporter that helps to regulate the brain's dopamine levels.
