= Timothy J. Richmond =

Swiss American molecular biologist, biochemist, and biophysicist

Timothy John Richmond (born October 9, 1948, in Corvallis) is a Swiss/American molecular biologist, biochemist, and biophysicist.

He graduated in 1970 with a bachelor's degree in biochemistry from Purdue University, where his teachers included Larry G. Butler (died 1997) and Michael G. Rossmann. Richmond graduated in 1975 from Yale University's department of molecular biophysics and biochemistry with a dissertation on protein-DNA interaction under the supervision of Frederic M. Richards and Thomas A. Steitz. Richmond was a postdoc at Yale University from 1975 to 1978 under the supervision of Frederic M. Richards and from 1978 to 1980 at the MRC Laboratory of Molecular Biology under the supervision of Sir Aaron Klug studying the nucleosome (which is the fundamental subunit of chromatin). Richmond was from 1980 to 1987 a tenured staff scientist at the MRC Laboratory of Molecular Biology and in 1987 was appointed "Professor of X-ray Crystallography of Biological Macromolecules" at ETH Zurich's Institute for Molecular Biology and Biophysics. At ETH Zurich he became in 2005 vice-chair of the biology department.

Richmond’s work provides a basis for integrating decades of biochemical, physical, and genetic studies of chromatin. His focus has been to establish the atomic structures of large macromolecular assemblies, particularly those involved in protein-DNA complexes and to relate these structures to the biological processes of chromatin assembly and transcription regulation.

The interests of Prof. Richmond in teaching and research are primarily devoted to the recognition and assembly of biological macromolecular complexes. X-ray crystallography, cryo-electron microscopy and other biophysical and biochemical techniques are employed by his laboratory. The focus of his research is on the organization of DNA in chromosomes and the regulation of gene expression in higher organisms. His laboratory has elucidated the structures of the nucleosome core particle and various transcription factor complexes. Their work on the nucleosome core particle, the fundamental repeating unit of chromatin, resulted ultimately in its atomic description at 1.9 å resolution. They have since determined the organization of nucleosomes in the chromatin fiber.

He was the postdoctoral supervisor of Karolin Luger.

Richmond was elected in 1994 a fellow of the American Association for the Advancement of Science (AAAS). He was elected a member in 1995 of the European Molecular Biology Organization (EMBO), in 2000 of the Academia Europaea, in 2004 of the German National Academy of Sciences Leopoldina, and in 2007 of the U.S. National Academy of Sciences. In 2001 he was awarded an honorary doctor of science degree by Purdue University. His prizes or awards include the Louis-Jeantet Prize for Medicine in 2002 and the Marcel Benoist Prize in 2006. In 2023, Timothy J. Richmond, Daniela Rhodes and Karolin Luger were awarded the WLA Prize in Life Science or Medicine "for elucidating the structure of the nucleosome at the atomic level, providing the basis for understanding chromatin, gene regulation, and epigenetics."

== Selected publications ==
- Richmond, T. J.; Finch, J. T.; Rushton, B.; Rhodes, D.; Klug, A. (1984). "Structure of the nucleosome core particle at 7 Å resolution". Nature. 311 (5986): 532–537. Bibcode:1984Natur.311..532R. doi:10.1038/311532a0. PMID 6482966. S2CID 4355982. (over 1250 citations)
- Richmond, Timothy J. (1984). "Solvent accessible surface area and excluded volume in proteins". Journal of Molecular Biology. 178 (1): 63–89. doi:10.1016/0022-2836(84)90231-6. PMID 6548264.
- Pellegrini, Luca; Tan, Song; Richmond, Timothy J. (1995). "Structure of serum response factor core bound to DNA". Nature. 376 (6540): 490–498. Bibcode:1995Natur.376..490P. doi:10.1038/376490a0. PMID 7637780. S2CID 4338634.
- Luger, Karolin; Mäder, Armin W.; Richmond, Robin K.; Sargent, David F.; Richmond, Timothy J. (1997). "Crystal structure of the nucleosome core particle at 2.8 Å resolution". Nature. 389 (6648): 251–260. Bibcode:1997Natur.389..251L. doi:10.1038/38444. PMID 9305837. S2CID 4328827. (over 10300 citations)
- Luger, Karolin; Rechsteiner, Thomas J.; Flaus, Andrew J.; Waye, Mary M.Y; Richmond, Timothy J. (1997). "Characterization of nucleosome core particles containing histone proteins made in bacteria 1 1Edited by A. Klug". Journal of Molecular Biology. 272 (3): 301–311. doi:10.1006/jmbi.1997.1235. PMID 9325091.
- Luger, Karolin; Richmond, Timothy J. (1998). "The histone tails of the nucleosome". Current Opinion in Genetics & Development. 8 (2): 140–146. doi:10.1016/S0959-437X(98)80134-2. PMID 9610403.
- Luger, Karolin; Richmond, Timothy J. (1998). "DNA binding within the nucleosome core". Current Opinion in Structural Biology. 8 (1): 33–40. doi:10.1016/S0959-440X(98)80007-9. PMID 9519294.
- Luger, Karolin; Rechsteiner, Thomas J.; Richmond, Timothy J. (1999). "Preparation of nucleosome core particle from recombinant histones". Chromatin. Methods in Enzymology. Vol. 304. pp. 3–19. doi:10.1016/S0076-6879(99)04003-3. ISBN 9780121822057. PMID 10372352.
- Luger, Karolin; Rechsteiner, Thomas J.; Richmond, Timothy J. (1999). "Expression and Purification of Recombinant Histones and Nucleosome Reconstitution". Chromatin Protocols. Methods in Molecular Biology. Vol. 119. pp. 1–16. doi:10.1385/1-59259-681-9:1. ISBN 1-59259-681-9. PMID 10804500.
- Davey, Curt A.; Sargent, David F.; Luger, Karolin; Maeder, Armin W.; Richmond, Timothy J. (2002). "Solvent Mediated Interactions in the Structure of the Nucleosome Core Particle at 1.9Å Resolution". Journal of Molecular Biology. 319 (5): 1097–1113. doi:10.1016/S0022-2836(02)00386-8. PMID 12079350. (over 1600 citations)
- Richmond, Timothy J.; Davey, Curt A. (2003). "The structure of DNA in the nucleosome core". Nature. 423 (6936): 145–150. Bibcode:2003Natur.423..145R. doi:10.1038/nature01595. PMID 12736678. S2CID 205209705. 2003 (over 1450 citations)
- Dorigo, Benedetta; Schalch, Thomas; Bystricky, Kerstin; Richmond, Timothy J. (2003). "Chromatin Fiber Folding: Requirement for the Histone H4 N-terminal Tail". Journal of Molecular Biology. 327 (1): 85–96. doi:10.1016/S0022-2836(03)00025-1. PMID 12614610.
- Dorigo, Benedetta; Schalch, Thomas; Kulangara, Alexandra; Duda, Sylwia; Schroeder, Rasmus R.; Richmond, Timothy J. (2004). "Nucleosome Arrays Reveal the Two-Start Organization of the Chromatin Fiber". Science. 306 (5701): 1571–1573. Bibcode:2004Sci...306.1571D. doi:10.1126/science.1103124. PMID 15567867. S2CID 20869252.
- Berger, Imre; Fitzgerald, Daniel J.; Richmond, Timothy J. (2004). "Baculovirus expression system for heterologous multiprotein complexes". Nature Biotechnology. 22 (12): 1583–1587. doi:10.1038/nbt1036. PMID 15568020. S2CID 8834637.
- Schalch, Thomas; Duda, Sylwia; Sargent, David F.; Richmond, Timothy J. (2005). "X-ray structure of a tetranucleosome and its implications for the chromatin fibre". Nature. 436 (7047): 138–141. Bibcode:2005Natur.436..138S. doi:10.1038/nature03686. PMID 16001076. S2CID 4387396. (over 900 citations)
