= Edward H. Egelman =

- Education: Brandeis University
- Spouse: Adrienne Weinberger
- Children: Serge Egelman, Liana Schwaitzberg
- Scientific career
- Workplaces: University of Virginia; Yale University; University of Minnesota

Edward "Ed" H. Egelman (born 1952) is a Harrison Distinguished Chair of biochemistry and molecular genetics at the University of Virginia. His research focuses on the application of cryo-EM in the study of protein-DNA complexes. He is a former president of the Biophysical Society, and an elected fellow of the National Academy of Sciences.

== Early life and education ==
Egelman grew up in Long Island, New York. He started college at age 16 after skipping two grades of school. He studied political science at Brandeis University for two years, before dropping out to join an anti-Vietnam War student activism group. When he returned to Brandeis five years later, he changed his major to physics, and graduated with a Bachelors of Arts in 1976. He then began a PhD in experimental physics at Harvard University, but dropped out and moved to France to begin culinary school. He decided that he wanted to pursue physics after all, and returned to Brandeis for a PhD in biophysics. He completed his PhD in 1982. He was a Jane Coffin Childs Fellow at the MRC Laboratory of Molecular Biology.

== Career ==
Egelman was hired as an assistant professor in Yale University's department of biophysics and biochemistry from 1984 to 1989, when he moved to the University of Minnesota. He was a member of the faculty there until he moved to the University of Virginia in 1999 as a professor of biochemistry and molecular genetics.

He was the editor-in-chief of Cell's Biophysical Journal from 2007 to 2012. He was president of the Biophysical Society from 2015 to 2016. He was elected to the American Academy of Microbiology in 2007 and to the National Academy of Sciences in 2019.

== Personal life ==
Edward Egelman is married to Adrienne Weinberger, an art historian, artist, and ASA fine arts appraiser, who has held positions at the Art Institute of Chicago, Baltimore Museum of Art, Yale Art Gallery, Yale Center for British Art and Museum of Fine Arts, Boston. They have two children, Serge Egelman, Research Director of the Usable Security & Privacy Group at the International Computer Science Institute (ICSI), and faculty member of the Department of Electrical Engineering and Computer Sciences (EECS) at the University of California, Berkeley; and Liana Schwaitzberg, a fine arts appraiser and investment adviser, and an art collection management specialist.
