= David Agard =

American biochemist

David A. Agard
- Education: Yale University (B.S., 1975); California Institute of Technology (Ph.D., 1980); University of California, San Francisco (Postdoctoral, 1980); MRC Laboratory (Postdoctoral, 1981–82)
- Known for: Protein Folding, Hsp90
- Awards: Presidential Young Investigator Award (1983–1991); Sidhu Award for Outstanding Contributions to Crystallography (1986)
- Scientific career
- Fields: Biophysics; Biochemistry; Cell Biology
- Workplaces: California Institute of Technology (1975–1978); University of California, San Francisco (1980) (1983– ) MRC Laboratory of Molecular Biology (1981)
- Thesis: Approaches to Macromolecular and Supramolecular Structure Determination
- Doctoral advisor: Robert M. Stroud
- Website: msg.ucsf.edu/content/david-agard-phd

David A. Agard is a professor of biochemistry and biophysics at the University of California, San Francisco. He earned his B.S. in molecular biochemistry and biophysics from Yale University and his Ph.D. in biological chemistry from California Institute of Technology. His research is focused on understanding the basic principles of macromolecular structure and function. He is a scientific director of the Institute for Bioengineering, Biotechnology, and Quantitative Biomedical Research and was a Howard Hughes Medical Institute investigator between 1986–2019.

In July 2022, the Chan Zuckerberg Initiative announced that Agard would serve on the founding scientific leadership team of the newly created Chan Zuckerberg Institute for Advanced Biological Imaging, a research center devoted to developing next-generation imaging technologies that enable "broad, full-scale views of biological systems."

== Awards ==
- Member, National Academy of Sciences (USA, 2007)
- Member, American Academy of Arts and Sciences (USA, 2009)
- Bijvoet Medal of the Bijvoet Center for Biomolecular Research of Utrecht University (Netherlands, 2018)
- The Stein and Moore Award of the Protein Society (2021)
- Distinguished Scientist Award of the Microscopy Society of America (2021)
