= Carlos Bustamante (biophysicist) =

Peruvian-American scientist (born 1951)

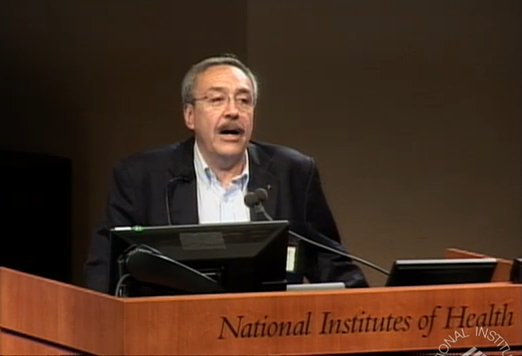
- Born: Carlos José Bustamante; May 6, 1951 (age 75); Lima, Peru
- Education: Cayetano Heredia University, National University of San Marcos, University of California, Berkeley
- Known for: Biophysics of DNA and protein
- Awards: Max Delbruck Prize (2002); Alexander Hollaender Award in Biophysics (2004)
- Scientific career
- Fields: Biophysics
- Workplaces: University of California, Berkeley
- Doctoral advisor: Ignacio Tinoco, Jr.
- Website: bustamante.berkeley.edu

Carlos José Bustamante (born 1951 in Lima, Peru) is a Peruvian-American scientist. He is a member of the National Academy of Sciences. He was elected as a Fellow of the American Physical Society in 1995.

== Biography ==
Carlos Bustamante is a Howard Hughes Medical Institute (HHMI) investigator, professor of molecular and cell biology, physics, and chemistry at the University of California, Berkeley, and Biophysicist Faculty Scientist at the Lawrence Berkeley National Laboratory.

Bustamante studied medicine in Peru at National University of San Marcos before discovering his true interest in biochemistry. He received his BSc from Cayetano Heredia University in Lima, his MSc in biochemistry from National University of San Marcos in Lima, and his PhD in biophysics from UC Berkeley, where he studied with Ignacio Tinoco, Jr. As a postdoctoral fellow at the Lawrence Berkeley National Laboratory, Bustamante studied with Marcos Maestre. Before moving to Berkeley, he was an HHMI investigator at the University of Oregon after serving as an assistant and associate professor in the University of New Mexico Department of Chemistry from 1982 to 1986.

== Research focus ==
Carlos Bustamante develops and uses novel methods of single-molecule visualization, such as scanning force microscopy, to study the structure and function of nucleoprotein assemblies. His laboratory is developing methods of single-molecule manipulation, such as optical tweezers, to characterize the elasticity of DNA, to induce the mechanical unfolding of individual protein molecules, and to investigate the machine-like behavior of molecular motors. Currently at UC Berkeley they are using the single-molecule manipulation method to study how protein-DNA and the process of gene expression are related.

Bustamante’s laboratory was the first to mechanically manipulate and stretch a single molecule of DNA using optical tweezers to measure its elastic properties, it was essential to his studies of molecular machines such as RNA polymerase and ribosomes.

A 2005 publication demonstrates RNA polymerase activity in using thermodynamic energy fluctuations to accomplish RNA transcription.

== Positions ==
- Assistant professor, department of chemistry, University of New Mexico (1982–1986)
- Associate professor, department of chemistry, University of New Mexico (1986–1989)
- Professor of chemistry, department of chemistry, University of New Mexico (1989–1990)
- Professor of chemistry and member of the Institute of Molecular Biology, University of Oregon (1991–1998)
- Professor in molecular and cell biology, chemistry, and physics, UC Berkeley (1998–present)
- Honorary professor, National University of San Marcos, Lima, Peru

== Fellowships and awards ==
- Searle Scholar (1984)
- Alfred P. Sloan Foundation Fellow (1985)
- Elected Fellow of the American Physical Society (1995), Citation: For pioneering the application of optical methods and scanning probes in measurements of the properties of single DNA molecules.
- Elected member, National Academy of Sciences, Biophysics 2002
- Max Delbrück Prize in Biological Physics (2002)
- Hans Neurath Award of the Protein Society (2004)
- In 2005 he received the Richtmyer Memorial Award given annually by the American Association of Physics Teachers.
- Alexander Hollaender Award in Biophysics (2004)
- Doctor Honoris Causa of National University of San Marcos, Lima, Peru
- Vilcek Prize in Biomedical Science (2012)
- Great Immigrants Award (2012)
- Raymond and Beverly Sackler International Prize in the Physical Sciences (2012)
