= Jane Dyson =

British-born biophysicist

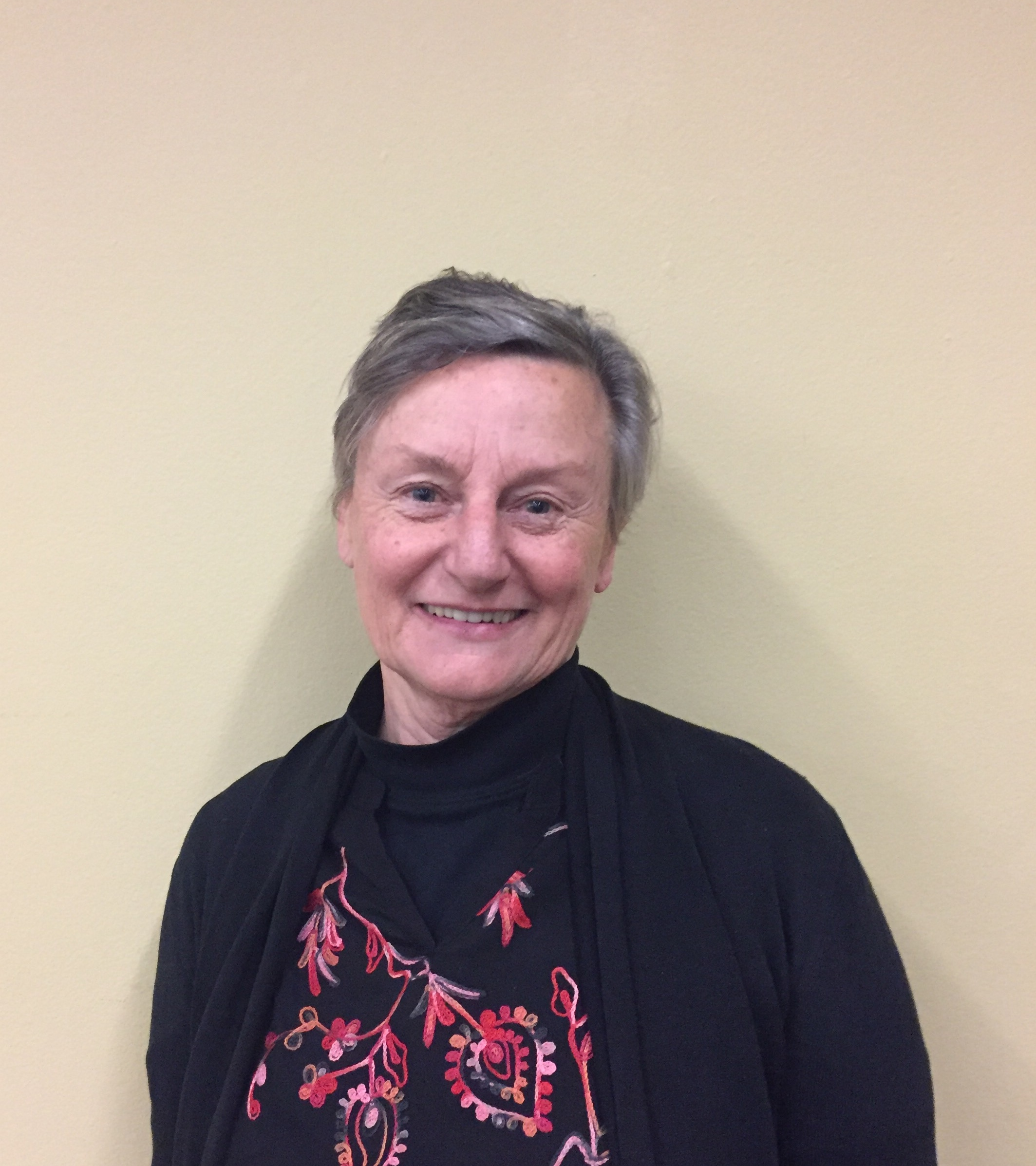
- Jane Dyson at the 2019 Biophysical Society Conference
- Born: Helen Jane Dyson; England
- Education: University of Sydney (BSc, PhD)
- Occupation: Biophysicist
- Spouse: Peter Wright
- Awards: Member of the National Academy of Sciences (2022)
- Scientific career
- Workplaces: Scripps Research; Massachusetts Institute of Technology; University of New South Wales
- Thesis: Dynamic and equilibrium spectrophotometry of hemoproteins (1976)
- Website: www.scripps.edu/dyson/

Helen Jane Dyson is a British-born biophysicist and a professor of integrative structural and computational biology at the Scripps Research Institute in La Jolla, California. She was the 15th editor-in-chief of the Biophysical Journal. She was elected a Member of the National Academy of Sciences in 2022.

== Early life and education ==
Jane Dyson was born in England, and was raised near Sydney. Dyson received her Bachelor of Science degree in biochemistry from the University of Sydney in 1973. She received her PhD in inorganic chemistry from the same institution in 1977.

== Career and research ==
After her PhD, Dyson did a postdoctoral fellowship at Massachusetts Institute of Technology with Paul Schimmel in 1977. From 1979 to 1984, Dyson was a UNESCO Lecturer in the School of Chemistry at the University of New South Wales. In 1984, she joined the lab of Richard Lerner at the Scripps Research Institute. In 1992, Dyson was appointed an associate professor at the department of molecular biology at the Scripps Research Institute. In 2001, she was promoted to professor.

Dyson applies biophysical techniques including Nuclear Magnetic Resonance Spectroscopy (NMR), mass spectrometry, circular dichroism, and fluorescence spectroscopy to study the relationships between the amino acid sequences of proteins and their structure and function. Dyson is well known for her work on intrinsically disordered proteins.

=== Awards and honours ===
Dyson has received several awards for her research including the Roslyn Flora Goulston Prize for Biochemistry from the University of Sydney in 1971. The Postdoctoral Award from the Damon Runyon-Walter Winchell Cancer Fund in 1977. In 2009, she was awarded a D.Sc. from the Faculty of Science at the University of Sydney. In 2010, Dyson received the Distinguished Scientist Award from the San Diego Section of the American Chemical Society.

=== Biophysical Journal ===
Jane Dyson was the fifteenth editor-in-chief of the Biophysical Journal and the first woman editor of the journal.

== Personal life ==
Dyson is married to scientist Peter Wright, who also studies intrinsically disordered proteins. They have two children.
