= Annual Review of Biophysics =

- Discipline: Biophysics
- Language: English
- Edited by: Jané Kondev

Publication details
- Former names: Annual Review of Biophysics and Bioengineering; Annual Review of Biophysics and Biophysical Chemistry; Annual Review of Biophysics and Biomolecular Structure
- History: 1972–present
- Publisher: Annual Reviews
- Frequency: Annually
- Open access: Subscribe to Open
- Impact factor: 12.9 (2025)

Standard abbreviations
- ISO 4: Annu. Rev. Biophys.

Indexing
- CODEN: ARBNCV
- ISSN: 1936-122X (print); 1936-1238 (web)
- LCCN: 2007215102
- OCLC no.: 85449594

Links
- Journal homepage; Online access; Online archive

The Annual Review of Biophysics is a peer-reviewed scientific journal published annually by Annual Reviews (AR). It covers all aspects of biophysics with solicited review articles. As of 2023, Annual Review of Biophysics is being published as open access, under the Subscribe to Open model. As of 2024, the editor became Jané Kondev. As of 2026, according to the Journal Citation Reports, the journal has a 2025 impact factor of 12.9 ranking it first out of 81 journals in the category "Biophysics".

== History ==
The Annual Review of Biophysics and Bioengineering was first published in 1972 in a collaboration between the Biophysical Society and Annual Reviews (AR), a nonprofit organization whose stated mission is to synthesize knowledge "for the progress of science and the benefit of society." Its inaugural editor was Manuel F. Morales. In 1985, the name of the journal was changed to Annual Review of Biophysics and Biophysical Chemistry, followed by another name change in 1992 to Annual Review of Biophysics and Biomolecular Structure. In 2008 the journal obtained its current title.

== Abstracting and indexing ==
The journal is abstracted and indexed in Scopus, Science Citation Index Expanded, BIOSIS Previews, Embase, MEDLINE, and Academic Search, among others.

== Editorial processes ==
The journal is helmed by the editor or the co-editors. The editor is assisted by the editorial committee, which includes associate editors, regular members, and occasionally guest editors. Guest members participate at the invitation of the editor, and serve terms of one year. All other members of the editorial committee are appointed by the AR board of directors and serve five-year terms. The editorial committee determines which topics should be included in each volume and solicits reviews from qualified authors. Unsolicited manuscripts are not accepted. Peer review is undertaken by the editorial committee.

=== Volume editors ===
Dates indicate publication years in which someone was credited as a lead editor or co-editor of a journal volume. The planning process for a volume begins well before the volume appears, so appointment to the position of lead editor generally occurred prior to the first year shown here. An editor who has retired or died may be credited as a lead editor of a volume that they helped to plan, even if it is published after their retirement or death.

- Manuel F. Morales (1972)
- Lorin J. Mullins (1973–1983)
- Donald M. Engelman (1984–1993)
- Robert M. Stroud (1994–2003)
- Douglas C. Rees (2004–2012)
- Douglas C. Rees and Ken A. Dill (2013–2014)
- Ken A. Dill (2015–2024)
- Jané Kondev (2024–present)

== See also ==
- List of physics journals
