= Manuel Morales (biophysicist) =

American biophysicist (1919–2009)

Manuel Francisco Morales
- Born: July 23, 1919; San Pedro, Sula, Honduras
- Died: November 12, 2009 (aged 90)
- Citizenship: Honduras (birthplace), United States
- Education: UC Berkeley A.B., Harvard University Ph.D
- Known for: energetics of ATP hydrolysis, myosin structure by FRET
- Awards: National Academy of Sciences, Order of the Rising Sun
- Scientific career
- Fields: Biophysics, Cell biology
- Workplaces: University of Chicago, Naval Medical Research Institute, Dartmouth Medical School, UCSF, University of the Pacific

Manuel Francisco Morales (July 23, 1919 – November 12, 2009) was a Honduran-born American biophysicist who did pivotal research on the molecular basis of muscle contraction.

== Scientific career ==
In the 1950s at the Naval Medical Research Institute, Morales and Terrell Hill showed that the high energy of the terminal phosphate bond in ATP was due to electrostatic repulsion between the three phosphate groups, and he and Richard Podolsky measured the heat of hydrolysis for ATP cleavage, the fundamental energy currency of biological metabolism.

== Awards and service ==
Morales was elected a member of the US National Academy of Sciences and awarded the Order of the Rising Sun (Japan). He served as president of the Biophysical Society for 1968–69, and was the founding editor of the Annual Review of Biophysics.

== Key publications ==
- Hill TL, Morales MF. (1951) On "High Energy Phosphate Bonds" of Biochemical Interest. Journal of the American Chemical Society 73: 1656–1660 (doi:10.1021/ja01148a072)
- Botts J, Morales MF (1953) Analytical description of the effects of modifiers and of enzyme multivalency upon the steady state catalyzed reaction rate, Trans. Faraday Soc., 49(6), 696–6707 (doi:10.1039/tf9534900696)
- Podolsky RJ, Morales MF. (1956) The Enthalpy Change of Adenosine Triphosphate Hydrolysis Journal of Biological Chemistry 218: 945–959 (pdf)
- Mendelson RA, Morales MF, Botts J. (1973) Segmental flexibility of the S-1 moiety of myosin. Biochemistry 12: 2250–2255 (doi:10.1021/bi00736a011)
- Morales MF, Botts J. (1979) On the molecular basis for chemomechanical energy transduction in muscle. Proceedings of the National Academy of Sciences USA 76: 3857–3859
- Botts J, Takashi R, Torgerson P, Hozumi T, Muhlrad A, D Mornet D, Morales MF. (1984) On the mechanism of energy transduction in myosin subfragment 1. Proceedings of the National Academy of Sciences USA 81: 2060–2064
- Botts J, Thomason JF, Morales MF. (1989) On the origin and transmission of force in actomyosin subfragment 1. Proceedings of the National Academy of Sciences USA 86: 2204–2208
- Onishi H, Mochizuki N, Morales MF. (2004) On the Myosin Catalysis of ATP Hydrolysis. Biochemistry 43: 3757–3763 (doi:10.1021/bi040002m)
