= Ken A. Dill =

American biophysicist and chemist

- Born: 1947 (age 78–79); Oklahoma City, Oklahoma
- Citizenship: American
- Education: Massachusetts Institute of Technology; University of California, San Diego
- Known for: Hydrophobic-polar protein folding model
- Awards: Max Delbruck Prize (2019)
- Scientific career
- Fields: Physics, Chemistry, Biology, Computational Biology
- Workplaces: Stony Brook University
- Doctoral advisor: Bruno H. Zimm

Kenneth Austin Dill (born 1947) is a biophysicist and chemist best known for his work in folding pathways of proteins. He is the director of the Louis and Beatrice Laufer Center for Physical and Quantitative Biology at Stony Brook University. He was elected a member of the National Academy of Sciences in 2008. He was elected to the American Academy of Arts and Sciences in 2014. He has been a co-editor or editor of the Annual Review of Biophysics since 2013.

== Life ==
Dill was born in Oklahoma City, Oklahoma in 1947. He attended MIT where he obtained a S.B. and S.M. in Mechanical Engineering (1971). He obtained his Ph.D. in 1978 at UCSD in the Biology Department working with Bruno H. Zimm, studying the biophysical properties of DNA molecules. Towards the end of his doctoral research, he had become interested in the mechanics of protein folding, specifically the way that the RNA-degrading enzyme Ribonuclease, folds into its native state. But before tackling the protein folding problem, he moved to Stanford University and worked with Paul J. Flory in Chemistry, for his post-doctoral training. After this, he went to the University of California, San Francisco, where he popularized the idea that any given protein's surrounding environment places constraints upon it, such that the shapes that it can assume are dramatically decreased. Dill introduced a toy model consisting of tethered beads on a lattice to mimic a folding protein, with beads of the same type (i.e. hydrophobic) attracting each other. Mathematically, the folding process can be visualized as a funnel, in which the several unfolded and misfolded high energy states of the protein occupy positions nearer the top of the funnel, but once the protein begins to fold, its options narrow down with the decrease in conformational entropy and the chain rapidly collapses into its most stable, low energy state. This state is sometimes identified with the native state of a natural protein. In Dill's words, "Like skiers all arriving at the same lodge, the folding protein gets systematically closer to the desired protein shape as it moves down the funnel".
