= Charles Cantor =

American molecular geneticist

Charles R. Cantor
- Born: August 26, 1942 (age 84); Brooklyn, New York, U.S.
- Education: Columbia University (BA); University of California, Berkeley (PhD)
- Known for: Pulse field gel electrophoresis
- Scientific career
- Fields: Molecular genetics
- Workplaces: Columbia University; University of California, Berkeley
- Doctoral advisor: Ignacio Tinoco Jr.

Charles R. Cantor (born August 26, 1942 in Brooklyn) is an American molecular geneticist who, in conjunction with David Schwartz, developed pulse field gel electrophoresis for very large DNA molecules. Cantor's three-volume book Biophysical Chemistry, co-authored with Paul Schimmel, was an influential textbook in the 1980s and 1990s.

== Career ==
Charles Cantor received his AB from Columbia University in 1963 and PhD from University of California, Berkeley in 1966.

He is Director of the Center for Advanced Biotechnology at Boston University. While on a two-year sabbatical acting as Chief Scientific Officer at Sequenom, Inc. he maintained his research laboratory at Boston University. He is also a co-founder and Director of Retrotope, a US-based company using heavier isotopes of carbon (^{13}C) and hydrogen (^{2}H, deuterium) to stabilize essential compounds like amino acids, nucleic acids and lipids to target age-related diseases.

Cantor held positions at Columbia University (1981–1989) and the University of California, Berkeley (1989–1992), before moving to Boston University in 1992. In 2017 he became Professor Adjunct in Molecular Medicine at Scripps Research.

He has been director of the Department of Energy Human Genome Project and Chairman of the Department of Biomedical Engineering at Boston University.

He is a consultant to more than 16 biotech firms, has published more than 400 peer-reviewed articles, been granted 54 US patents, and co-authored a three-volume textbook on Biophysical Chemistry.

== Publications ==
=== Papers ===
Charles Cantor obtained his Ph.D. in the group of Ignacio Tinoco, with whom he published work on the optical properties of nucleotides. In post-doctoral work with Thomas Jukes he studied repetitive sequences in polypeptides, but most of his independent research has concerned nucleic acids, from his early work with nuclear magnetic resonance (NMR) and repetitive sequences in polydeoxyribonucleotides. onwards.

Cantor's laboratory at Boston University has developed methods for separating large DNA molecules, for studying structural relationships in complex proteins and nucleic acids, and for sensitive detection of proteins and nucleic acids in a variety of settings. His work has been very highly cited, with five papers cited more than 1000 times each: 2709 citations of work on a toggle switch in Escherichia coli, 2594 of his paper on microtubule assembly, 2412 on his paper on pulsed field gel electrophoresis, 1437 on the launching of the ENCODE project (with about 200 authors), and 1176 on a study of noise in gene expression.

=== Reviews ===
Cantor's reviews include one on the physical chemistry of nucleic acids.

=== Books ===
Cantor co-authored Biophysical Chemistry with Paul Schimmel, which was published in three volumes: Part 1, The Conformation of Biological Macromolecules; Part 2, Techniques for the Study of Biological Structure and Function; Part 3, The Behavior of Biological Macromolecules

With Cassandra Smith, he wrote Genomics: The Science and Technology Behind the Human Genome Project.
