= Bruno H. Zimm =

American chemist (1920–2005)

- Born: October 31, 1920; Woodstock, New York, United States
- Died: November 26, 2005 (aged 85); La Jolla, California, United States
- Education: Columbia University
- Known for: Polymer chemist & DNA researcher
- Awards: Fellow of the APS (1953); Member of the NAS (1958); NAS Award in Chemical Sciences (1981)
- Scientific career
- Fields: Chemistry
- Doctoral advisor: Joseph E. Mayer
- Doctoral students: Donald Crothers; Ken A. Dill

Bruno Hasbrouck Zimm (October 31, 1920 – November 26, 2005) was an American chemist. He was a professor of chemistry and biochemistry at the University of California, San Diego, and a leading polymer chemist and DNA researcher.

== Early life ==
Zimm was born an only child in 1920 in Woodstock, New York. His father was the sculptor Bruno Louis Zimm, and his mother a writer. Zimm graduated from Kent School in Kent, Connecticut in 1938. After obtaining his Ph.D. in physical chemistry under the tutelage of Joe Mayer at Columbia University in 1944, he moved across town for postdoctoral work with Herman Mark at the Polytechnic Institute of Brooklyn, where he began his research on light scattering.

== Career ==
In 1946 he took a position at UC Berkeley, where he continued the work on light scattering and invented the famous Zimm plot for determining both size (molecular weight) and shape factors for large molecules. He then spent most of the 1950's at the General Electric Research Laboratory in Schenectady, New York. After a brief stint as a visiting professor at Yale in 1960, he moved to the University of California, San Diego (UCSD), where he remained for the rest of his life.

== Research ==
In 1956, Zimm extended the Rouse model of Polymer Physics to include hydrodynamic interactions mediated by the solvent between different parts of the chain. Whilst the original Rouse model overestimates the decrease of the diffusion coefficient D with the number of polymer beads N as 1/N, the Zimm model predicts D~1/Nν which is consistent with the experimental data for dilute polymer solutions, and where ν is the Flory exponent, a measure of the polymer solubility.

In 1959, together with J.K. Bragg, Zimm wrote a classic paper on the helix-coil transition for polypeptides; a year later he published a second paper on the “melting” of the helical forms of DNA.

== See also ==
- Zimm–Bragg model
