= Anthony Kossiakoff =

American structural biologist (born 1945)

- Born: May 4, 1945; Cumberland, Maryland
- Education: Davis & Elkins College; University of Delaware
- Scientific career
- Fields: Structural Biology
- Workplaces: University of Chicago
- Thesis: THE CRYSTAL AND MOLECULAR STRUCTURE OF: A. DIISOCYANATO BISCYCLOPENTADIENYL TITANIUM(IV) AND DIISOCYANATO BISCYCLOPENTADIENYL ZIRCONIUM(IV) AND B. EAKERITE (Ca_{2}SnAl_{2}Si_{6}O_{18}(OH)_{2}(H_{2}O)_{2}). (1973)
- Doctoral advisor: Robert H. Wood
- Other academic advisors: Robert Stroud
- Website: https://bcmb.uchicago.edu/faculty/anthony-kossiakoff-phd

Anthony Alexander Kossiakoff is an American structural biologist and is a professor of biochemistry and molecular biology at the University of Chicago. He is best known for his work in protein engineering.

== Education and career ==
Kossiakoff was born in Cumberland, Maryland, on May 4, 1945, while his father Alexander Kossiakoff worked for the Allegany Ballistics Laboratory. The younger Kossiakoff graduated from Davis and Elkins College in 1968 with degrees in chemistry and mathematics. He then earned a PhD in physical chemistry at the University of Delaware in 1972, and a subsequent postdoc with Robert Stroud at California Institute of Technology.

Kossiakoff joined Brookhaven National Laboratory as a senior biophysicist from 1975 to 1983. He worked at Genentech from 1983 to 1998 and served as the director of the protein engineering department. He was then recruited to serve as the chair of the biochemistry and molecular biology department at the University of Chicago from 1998, eventually being named the Otho S.A. Sprague Distinguished Service Professor. He was elected a fellow of the American Association for the Advancement of Science in 2012, and a member of the National Academy of Sciences in 2023.
