= List of Istanbul Technical University people =

This is a list of people associated with Istanbul Technical University in Turkey.

== Politics ==
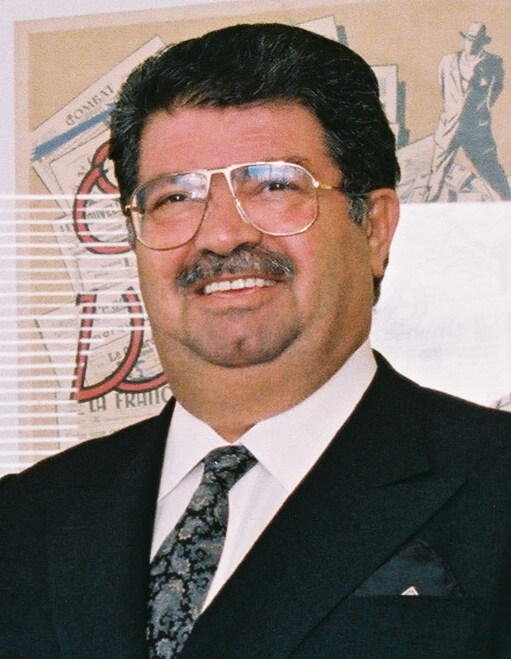
Turgut Özal, 8th President of Turkey

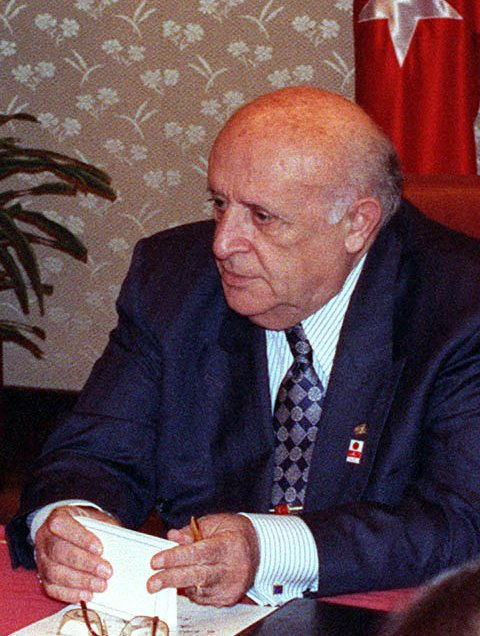
Süleyman Demirel, 9th President of Turkey

- Ahmet Arslan (born 1962) — Minister of Transport, Maritime and Communication and a Member of Parliament for Kars
- Fatih Birol (born 1958) — Executive Director of the International Energy Agency (2015–present), Chief Economist of the International Energy Agency (1995-2015)
- Bedrettin Dalan (born 1941) — Former Mayor of Istanbul (1984–1989)
- Vedat Ali Dalokay (1927–1991) — Former Mayor of Ankara (1973–1977)
- Süleyman Demirel (1924-2015) — Former President of Turkey (1993–2000) and Prime Minister
- Aytaç Durak (1938-2014) — Mayor of Adana (1994–2014)
- Necmettin Erbakan (1926-2011) — Former Prime Minister (1996–1997) and former President of TOBB (1969)
- Veysel Eroğlu (born 1948) — Former Minister of Environment and Head of State Hydraulic Works
- Safa Giray (1931-2011) — Former Minister of Foreign Affairs (1991)
- Recai Kutan (born 1930) — President of Felicity Party
- Turgut Özal (1927–1993) — Former President of Turkey (1989–1993) and Prime Minister (1983–1989)
- Ruhsar Pekcan (born 1958) — Minister of Trade (2018-2021)
- Binali Yıldırım (born 1955) — Prime Minister, maritime engineer and former Minister of Transport, Maritime and Communication
- Taner Yıldız (born 1962) — Minister of Energy and Natural Resources (2009-2015)
- İsmet Yılmaz (born 1961) — Minister of National Education of Turkey and former Speaker of the Grand National Assembly

== Business ==
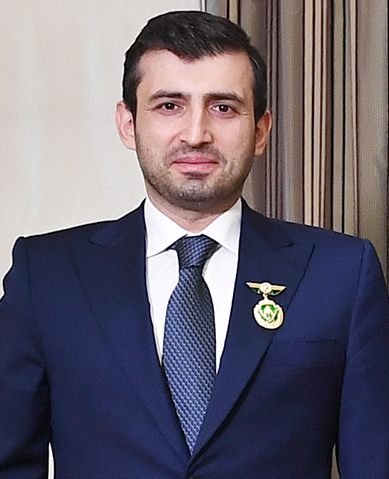
Selçuk Bayraktar, CTO of Baykar

- İshak Alaton (born 1927) — Co-founder of Alarko Holding
- Selçuk Bayraktar (born 1979) — Chief Technology Officer of Baykar
- Üzeyir Garih (1929–2001) — Co-founder of Alarko Holding
- Sadi Gülçelik (born 1929) — Co-founder of ENKA Holding
- Mehmet Hacim Kamoy (1922-2004) — Founding CEO of ASELSAN
- Temel Kotil (born 1959) — CEO of Turkish Airlines
- Volkan Sevilgen (born 1980) — CTO and co-founder of Temblor, Inc.
- Şarık Tara (born 1930) — Co-founder of ENKA Holding
- Faruk Yarman (born 1954) — CEO of HAVELSAN

== Science and technology ==
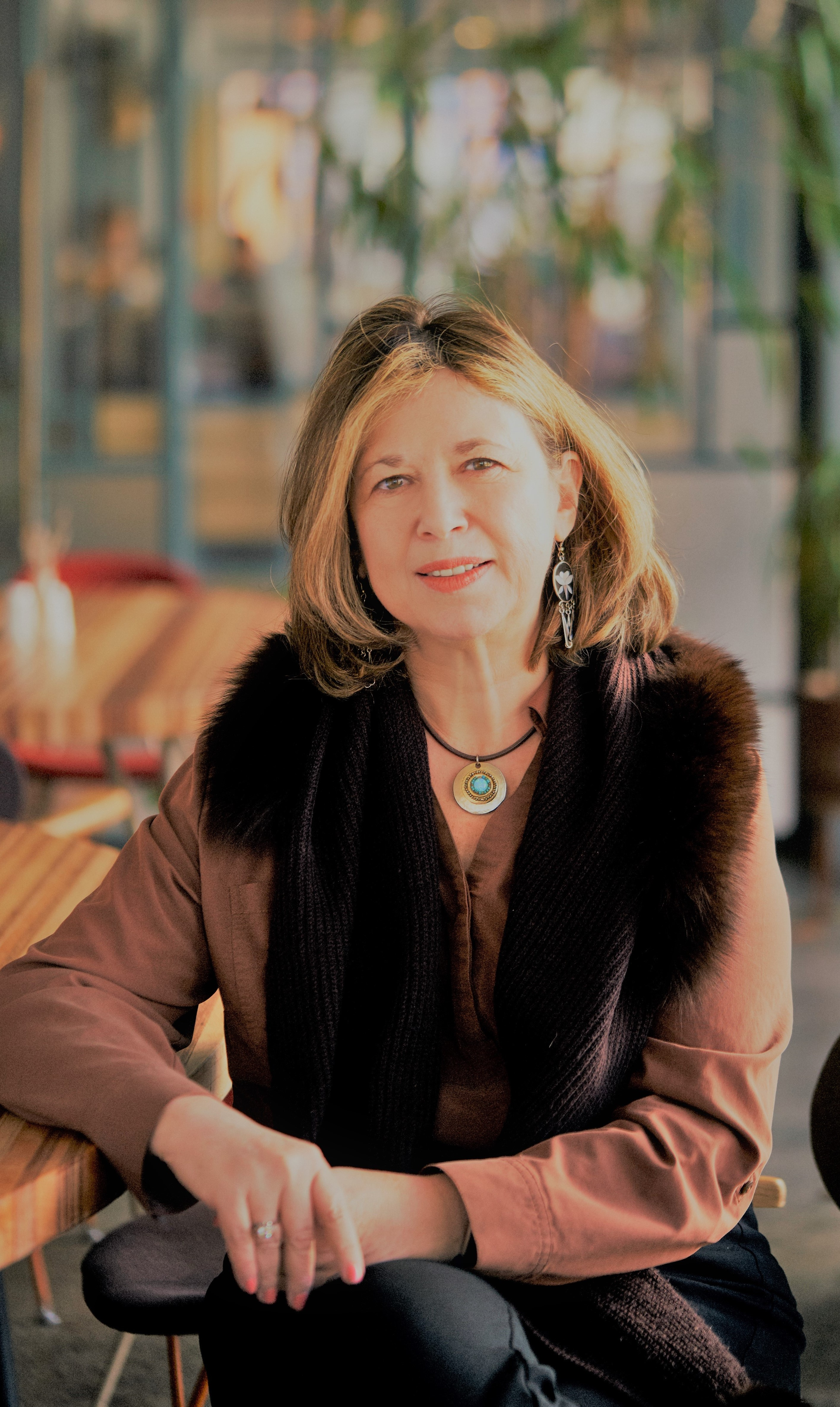
Ivet Bahar, Director of the Louis and Beatrice Laufer Center for Physical and Quantitative Biology

- Zeynep Ahunbay (born 1946) — Architectural historian
- Ali Akansu (born 1958) — Electrical & computer engineering and scientist, professor at NJIT
- Attila Aşkar (born 1944) — Civil engineer and applied mathematician, former President and Rector of the Koç University (2001-2009)
- Ivet Bahar — Computational biologist, professor at the Stony Brook University
- Behruz Çinici — Architect of METU Ankara Campus and Atatürk University Campus
- Alper Derinboğaz — Architect
- Ali Erdemir — Material scientist
- A. Cemal Eringen (1921-2009) — Civil engineer and applied mathematician; professor at Princeton University
- Cem Göknar — Electrical/electronics engineer
- Mehmet Gümüşburun — Chemical engineer and bureaucrat
- Selda Gunsel — Turkish-American chemical engineer
- Sabiha Gürayman — First Turkish woman engineer
- Doğan Kuban (born 1926) — Architectural historian
- Emin Halid Onat (1908–1961) — Architect of Anıtkabir and first dean of ITU School of Architecture
- Hürriyet Sırmaçek (1912 - 1983) — Turkey's first female bridge engineer
- Mehmet Toner (born 1958) — Biomedical engineering and scientist, professor at Harvard Medical School

== Arts ==
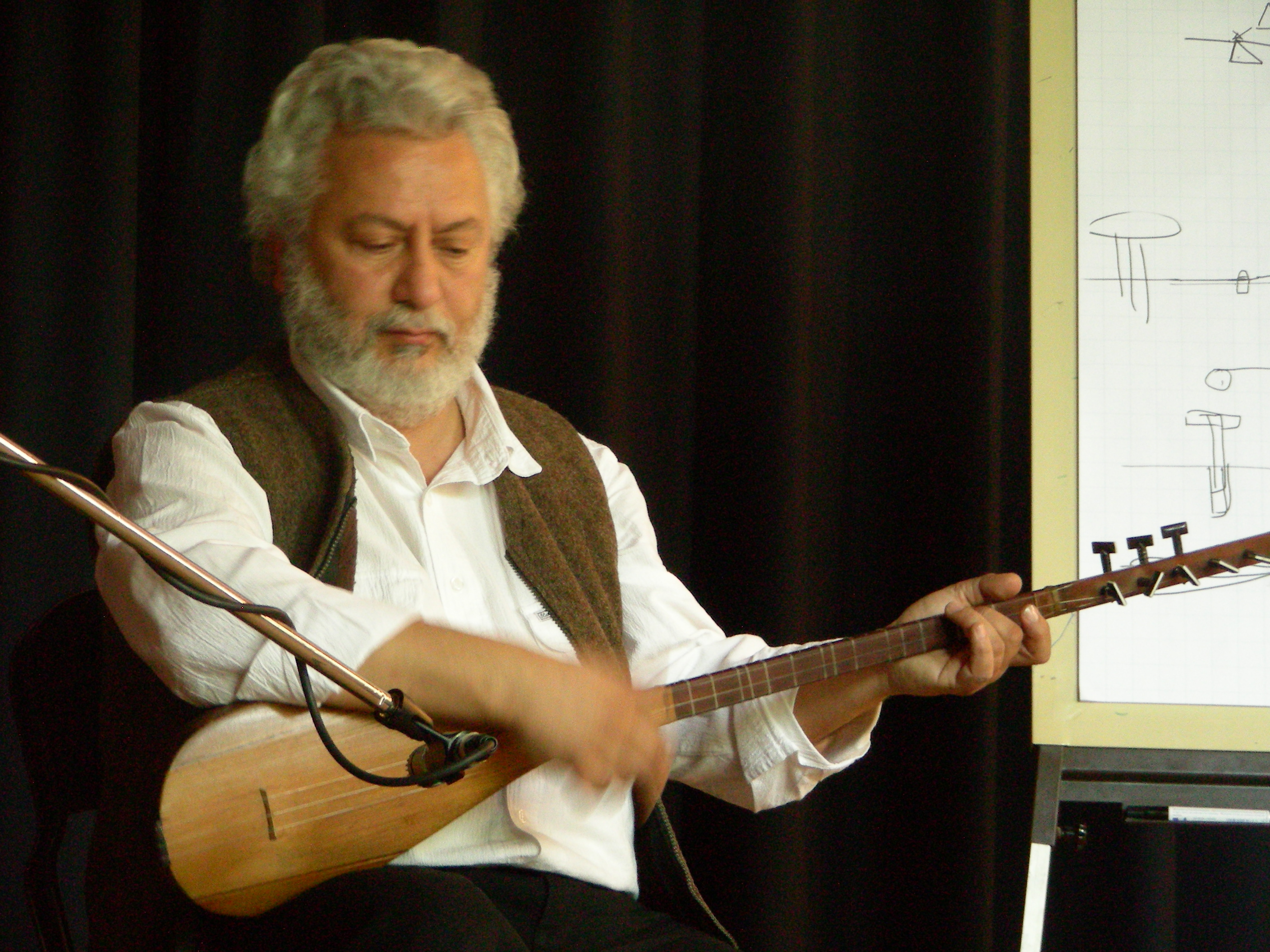
Erkan Oğur, Turkish musician

- Funda Arar (born 1975) — Pop singer
- Ahmet Aslan (born 1968) — Musician
- Oğuz Atay (1934–1977) — Novelist
- Murat Boz — Pop singer
- Güler Duman (born 1967) — Turkish folk music
- Berke Hatipoğlu (born 1976) — Guitarist of the rock band Redd
- Erkan Oğur (born 1954) — Musician
- Ziynet Sali — Singerd
- Ahmet Yalçınkaya (born 1963) — Poet

== Sports ==
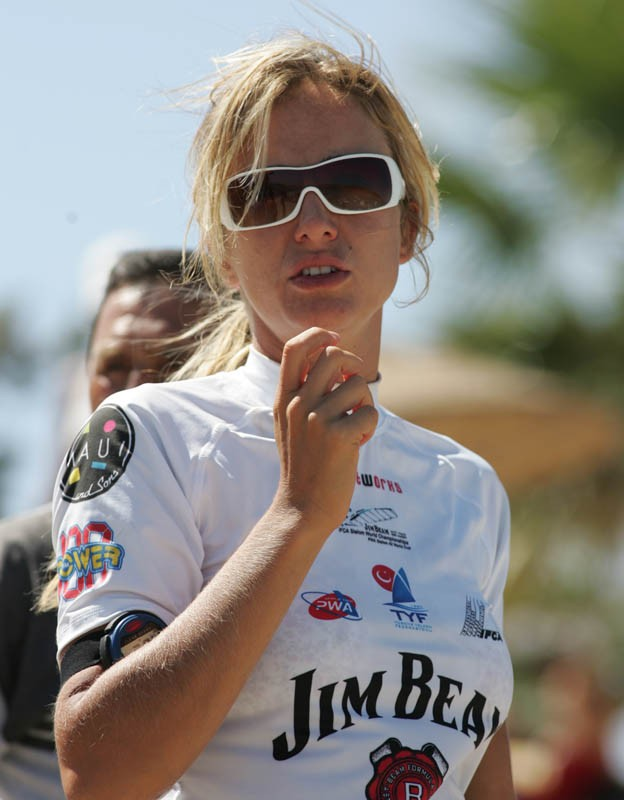
Çağla Kubat, Turkish actress, model, windsurfer

- Çağla Kubat — Windsurfer
- Zehra Öktem — Olympic archer

== Other ==
- Ateşan Aybars (Class of 1973) — Economist, TV celebrity, biomedical engineer and commodity trading advisor
- Harun Karadeniz (1942–1975) — 1970s student leader and activist
- Waleed A. Samkari — Commander of Jordan Royal Maintenance Corps
