= Privatization Board of Turkey =

Turkish government agency

- Key people: Bekir Emre Haykir
- Website: http://www.oib.gov.tr/index_eng.htm

The Privatization Administration of Turkey (Turkish: T.C. Özelleştirme İdaresi Başkanlığı), founded on 27 November 1994, Law No.4046, is a government agency in Turkey. It is responsible for the privatization process of public sector companies as well as other public assets and services.

== List of completely privatized companies in Turkey ==
1. Adıyaman Çimento Sanayii T.A.Ş.
2. Anadolubank A.Ş.
3. ÇELBOR Ç.Çekme Boru San.ve Tic.
4. Türkiye Gemi Sanayii A.Ş.
5. Denizbank A.Ş.
6. Denizli Çimento Sanayii T.A.Ş.
7. Ergani Çimento Sanayii T.A.Ş.
8. Eti Gümüş A.Ş.
9. Eti Krom A.Ş.
10. Eti Elektrometalurgy
11. Eti Aluminium
12. Filyos Ateş Tuğlası Sanayi T.A.Ş.
13. İskenderun Çimento Sanayii T.A.Ş.
14. İskenderun Demir ve Çelik
15. Karabük Demir Çelik Fabrikası
16. Kars Çimento Sanayii ve Tic. T.A.Ş.
17. Ladik Çimento Sanayii T.A.Ş.
18. Lalapaşa Çimento Sanayii T.A.Ş.
19. Ordu Soya Sanayii A.Ş.
20. Sivas Çimento Sanayii T.A.Ş.
21. Sümerbank A.Ş.
22. Şanlıurfa Çimento Sanayii T.A.Ş
23. TAKSAN
24. Trabzon Çimento Sanayii T.A.Ş
25. USAŞ Uçak Servisi A.Ş.
26. Van Çimento Sanayii T.A.Ş
27. BOZÜYÜK Seramik San. ve Tic. A.Ş.
28. YEMSAN Yem Sanayi A.Ş.
29. Türkiye Süt Ürünleri A.Ş.
30. Kurtalan Çimento Sanayi ve Tic. A.Ş
31. Etibank Bankacılık A.O.
32. HAVAŞ
33. Konya Krom Manyezit Tuğla San.
34. Yarımca Porselen San. Tic.A.Ş.
35. ÇITOSAN T.Çimento ve Topr.San.
36. ORÜS orman Ürünleri A.Ş.
37. Petrol Ofisi A.Ş.
38. Turban Turizm A.Ş.
39. TUMOSAN T.Motor San.Tic.A.Ş.
40. Türkiye Zırai Donatım A.Ş.
41. Türkiye Demir Çelik İşletmeleri A.Ş.
42. ESGAZ
43. BURSAGAZ
44. DİV-HAN
45. ETİ Bakır A.Ş.
46. ETAĞ Etimesgut Ağaç SAn.Tic.
47. T.Selüloz ve Kağıt FAb. (SEKA)
48. T.Gübre Sanayi (TÜGSAŞ)
49. TÜPRAŞ
50. Deniz nakliyatı T.A.Ş.
51. YASATAŞ Turistik Tesisleri A.Ş.
52. Sivas Demir Çelik İşletmeleri A.Ş.
53. GERKONSAN
54. PETLAS Lastik Sanayi A.Ş.
55. Güven Sigorta T.A.Ş.
56. Trakya(Pınarhisar) Çimento San.
57. Elazığ Çimento Sanayii A.Ş.
58. Çorum Çimento Sanayii T.A.Ş
59. KÖYTEKS Yatırım Holding
60. Niğde Çimento Sanayii T.A.Ş
61. Bartın Çimento Sanayii T.A.Ş
62. KÜMAŞ Kütahya Manyezit İşl.A.Ş.
63. Gaziantep Çimento Sanayii T.A.Ş
64. TESTAŞ T.Elektronik San.Tic.A.Ş.
65. Söke Çimento Sanayii T.A.Ş
66. Afyon Çimento Sanayii T.A.Ş
67. Aksaray Azmi Milli T.A.Ş.
68. Ankara Çimento Sanayii T.A.Ş
69. GİMA Gıda ve İhtiyaç Mad. T.A.Ş.
70. ÇİNKUR Çinko Kurşun Metal San.
71. Balıkesir Çimento Sanayii T.A.Ş
72. Asil Çelik San. ve Tic A.Ş.
73. MEYSU A.Ş.
74. Gümüşhane Çimento Sanayii T.A.Ş
75. Adapazarı Şeker Fabrikası
76. NİMSA Niğde Mey. Su. Gıd.San. A.Ş.
77. TOE-Türk Otomotiv Endüstrileri A.Ş.
78. ANSAN Ankara Meşrubat Sanayii
79. KÖYTAŞ Köy Tarım Makinaları A.Ş.
80. Ankara Anonym Türk Sigorta Şirketi
81. GÜNEYSU A.Ş.
82. Tüstaş Sınai Tesisleri A.Ş.
83. Adana Kağıt Torba Sanayii T.A.Ş.
84. Ataköy Turizm Tesisleri ve Tic.A.Ş.
85. Başak Sigorta A.Ş.
86. Ataköy Otelcilik A.Ş.
87. Baha Esat Kütahya Şeker Fab.A.Ş.
88. ERDEMİR
89. Bursa Soğuk Depoculuk Ltd. Şti.
90. İpragaz A.Ş.
91. DİTAŞ Deniz İşlet. ve Tankerciliği
92. Cyprus Turkish Airlines
93. Türkiye-Libya Ortak Tarım ve Hay.
94. Ray Sigorta A.Ş.
95. ÇEMAŞ Döküm Sanayi A.Ş
96. Ünye Çimento Sanayi A.Ş.
97. Çaybank A.Ş
98. NETAŞ Northern Elektrik Telekom
99. BİNAŞ Bingöl Yem Sanayii A.Ş.
100. Adana Çimento Sanayii T.A.Ş.
101. Mardin Çimento Sanayii A.Ş.
102. Çayeli Bakır İşletmeleri A.Ş.
103. Eskişehir Yem Fabrikası A.Ş.
104. Trakmak Traktör ve Ziraat Mak.
105. PAN Tohum Islah ve Üretme A.Ş.
106. Konya Çimento Sanayii A.Ş.
107. YİFAŞ Yeşilyurt Tekstil
108. Kepez Elektrik A.Ş.
109. TELETAŞ Telekom. End.ve Tic. A.Ş
110. Migros Türk T.A.Ş.
111. Başak Emeklilik AS.
112. Biga Yem Fabrikası A.Ş.
113. Istanbul Demir Çelik SAnayi A.Ş.
114. Aksaray Yem Fabrikası A.Ş.
115. SUNTEK Ağır Isı Sanayi A.Ş.
116. AEG Eti Elektrik A.Ş.
117. Türkkablo A.O.
118. Kars Yem Fabrikası A.Ş.
119. Bolu Çimento Sanayii A.Ş.
120. Türk Traktör ve Ziraat Makinaları
121. ÇİMHOL Çimento Y. Mam. San.
122. Polinas Plastik Sanayi T.A.Ş.
123. Güneş Sigorta A.Ş.
124. Çorum Yem Fabrikası A.Ş.
125. ALTEK Elekt. Sant. Tes.İşlt.ve Tic.
126. Çelik Halat ve Tel Sanayii A.Ş.
127. MEKTA Ticaret A.Ş.
128. Çamsan Ağaç Sanayi T.A.Ş.
129. Çukurova Elektrik A.Ş.
130. ÇANTAŞ Çankırı Tuz Üre.ve Değ.
131. Toros Zirai İlaç ve Pazarlama A.Ş.
132. SAMAŞ Sanayi Madenleri A.Ş.
133. Bandırma Yem Fabrikası Ltd. Şti.
134. Konya Şeker Fabrikası A.Ş.
135. TOFAŞ Türk Otomabil Fabrikaları A.Ş
136. TOFAŞ Oto Ticaret A.Ş.
137. YEMTA A.Ş.
138. KÖY-TÜR Ana Dam.Tavuk San.Tic.
139. ETÜDAŞ-Erzincan Tarım Ürün.Üre.
140. Metal Kapak Sanayi A.Ş.
141. Tat Konserve Sanayii A.Ş.
142. ÖBİTAŞ İnşaat ve Tic.A.Ş.
143. Arçelik A.Ş.
144. Pancar Motor Sanayii A.Ş.
145. Yeni Çeltek Kömür ve Madencilik
146. Fruko Tamek Meyve Suları San. A.Ş.
147. Ataköy Marina ve Yat İşletmeleri
148. Manisa Yem Fabrikası A.Ş.
149. Isparta Yem Fabrikası A.Ş.
150. Tungaş Tunceli Gıda Sanayi A.Ş.
151. Olgun Çelik San.ve Tic. A.Ş.
152. Amasya Şeker Fabrikası
153. DİTAŞ Doğan Yedek Parça İmalat
154. Toros Gübre ve Kimya Endüstrisi A.Ş
155. ABANA Elektromekanik San. A.Ş.
156. Şeker Sigorta A.Ş.
157. Kayseri Yem Fabrikası A.Ş.
158. Aymar Yağ Sanayi A.Ş.
159. Şekerbank T.A.Ş.
160. Pancar Ekicileri Birliği A.Ş.
161. Kömür İşletmeleri A.Ş.
162. Aroma Bursa Meyve Suları San. A.Ş.
163. Türkiye Sınai Kalkınma Bankası A.Ş.
164. Ege Et ve Mamulleri Ye San.ve Tic.
165. Çanakkale Seramik Fabrikaları A.Ş.
166. Pınar Entegre Et ve Yem San. A.Ş.
167. Tamek Gıda Sanayii A.Ş.
168. Hektaş Ticaret T.A.Ş.
169. Layne Bowler Dik Türbin Pomp. A.Ş.
170. Ankara Halk Ekmek ve Un Fab. A.Ş.
171. Sivas Yem Fabrikası A.Ş.
172. Hascan Gıda Endüstrisi A.Ş.
173. Mars Ticaret ve Sanayi A.Ş.
174. MAKSAN Malatya Makina Sanayi A.Ş.
175. ÇESTAŞ Çukurova Elektrik San. A.Ş.
176. Balıkesir Pamuklu Dokuma San.
177. İMSA İstanbul Meşrubat Sanayi A.Ş.
178. Liman İşletmeleri ve Nak.San. Tic.
179. Ülfet Gıda ve Sabun San.A.Ş.
180. MAN Kamyon ve Otobüs San.A.Ş.
181. OYTAŞ İç ve Dış Ticaret A.Ş.
182. Ceyhan Sanayi ve Ticaret A.Ş.
183. Dosan Konserve San. ve Ticaret A.Ş
184. Aydın Tekstil İşletmesi A.Ş.
185. Karadeniz Çimento Kireç ve Ürün.
186. T.Elektromekanik SAn.A.Ş.
187. T.Kalkınma Bankası A.Ş.
