= Ivet Bahar =

Computational Biologist

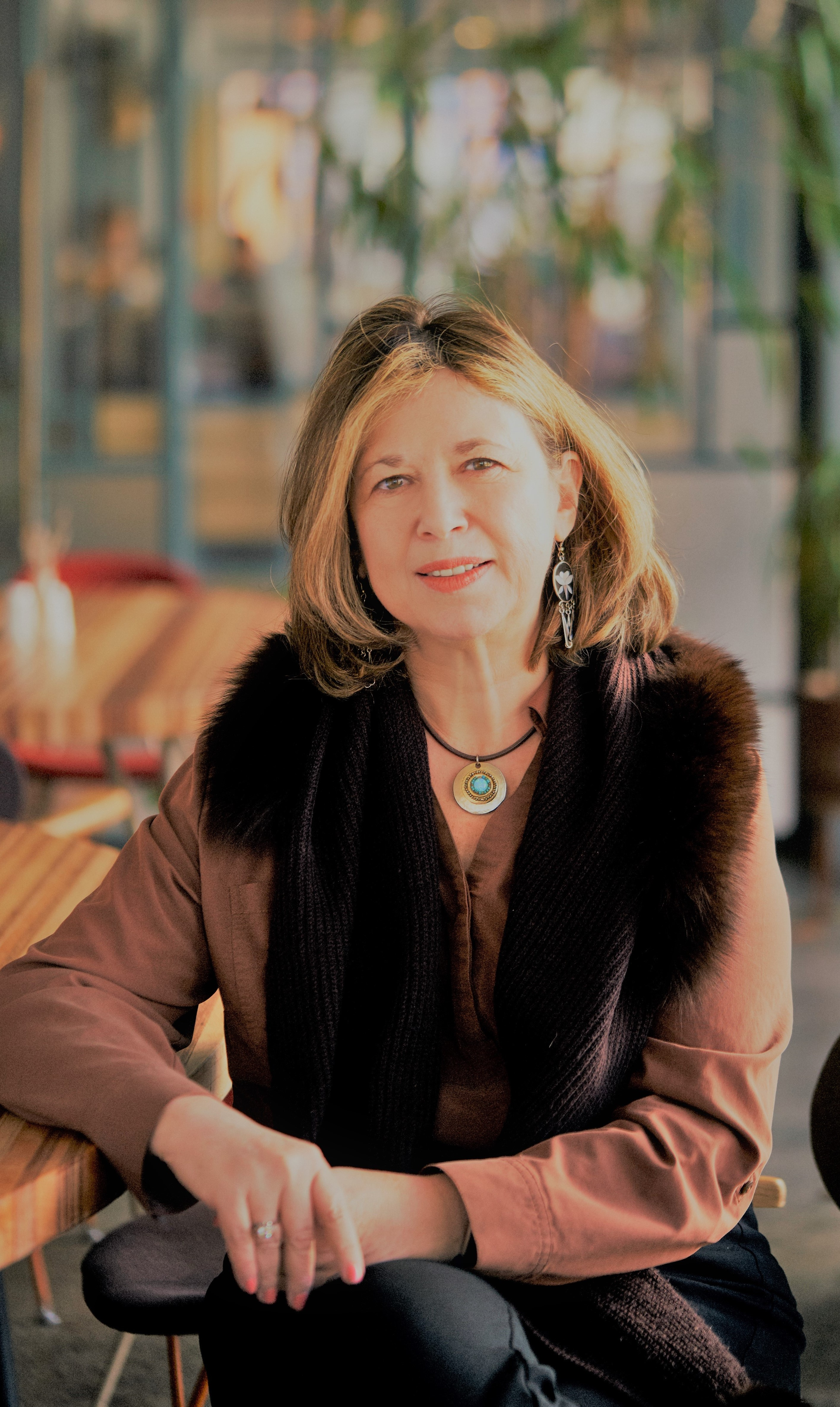
- (default)px
- Born: Ivet Bahar; Istanbul, Turkey
- Citizenship: United States
- Education: Boğaziçi University (BS, MS); Istanbul Technical University (PhD)
- Known for: Gaussian Network Model; Anisotropic Network Model
- Spouse: Dr. Izzet Bahar
- Scientific career
- Fields: Computational biology; Molecular biophysics; Systems biology; Computer-aided drug discovery
- Workplaces: Stony Brook University
- Website: bahargroup.org/Faculty/bahar/

Ivet Bahar is a Turkish-American computational biologist, currently serving as the Director of the Louis and Beatrice Laufer Center for Physical and Quantitative Biology, Louis & Beatrice Laufer Endowed Chair and Professor of Biochemistry and Cell Biology at the Stony Brook University, School of Medicine. Before joining Stony Brook University, she served as Distinguished Professor, John K. Vries Chair and Founder of the Department of Computational and Systems Biology at the University of Pittsburgh School of Medicine (2001-2022), and as Assistant (1986-1987), Associate (1987-1993) and Full Professor (1993-2001) at the Chemical Engineering Department of Boğaziçi University, Istanbul, Turkey. Dr. Bahar is also the co-founder of an internationally acclaimed Joint CMU-Pitt Ph.D. Program in Computational Biology, CPCB, offered by the University of Pittsburgh and Carnegie Mellon University. She is an elected member of the European Molecular Biology Organization (EMBO) since 2000. She was elected to the National Academy of Sciences in 2020.

== Research ==
Dr. Bahar adapted fundamental theories and methods of polymer statistical mechanics to biomolecular structure and dynamics. She pioneered a modified version of the classical Rouse model, to examine the collective dynamics of proteins modeled as elastic network models (ENMs). ENMs have three strengths: simplicity, ability to yield a unique solution for each structure, and efficient applicability to supramolecular complexes/assemblies. Her theory and methods have withstood numerous tests since their inception, and established fundamental concepts in molecular biology: the role of entropy-driven fluctuations defined by 3D contact topology in optimizing biomolecular interactions; the evolutionary pressure for robustly maintaining structural dynamics to support flexible mechanisms of actions – not only structure to ensure stability; the ability of proteins to exploit their structure-encoded dynamics to adapt to promiscuous interactions and mutations as demonstrated in numerous applications, including neurotransmitter transporters in recent years. Recent application to chromosomal dynamics provided insights into the physical basis of gene co-expression and regulation events.

== Personal life ==
Dr. Bahar currently resides in Long Island, New York. She came to the United States to become a professor at the University of Pittsburgh, Department of Molecular Genetics & Biochemistry in 2001. Notably, she is the first Turkish female scientist elected to the National Academy of Sciences of the United States. In 2016, she was invited by President Barack Obama as a guest speaker to the White House to give a talk on "Exascale Computing for Multiscale Modeling and Big Data in Biology." She is married to Dr. Izzet Bahar, and has two sons, Joseph and Albert.
