= Temblor =

Temblor may refer to:

- Temblor (The Batman), Batman villain
- Temblor Range, mountain range in California
- Temblor, another name for earthquake
- On pipe organs, tremulant
- Temblor, Inc., a startup dealing with seismic risk
