= Lycée Saint-Joseph, Istanbul =

- İstanbul Özel Saint-Joseph Fransız Lisesi

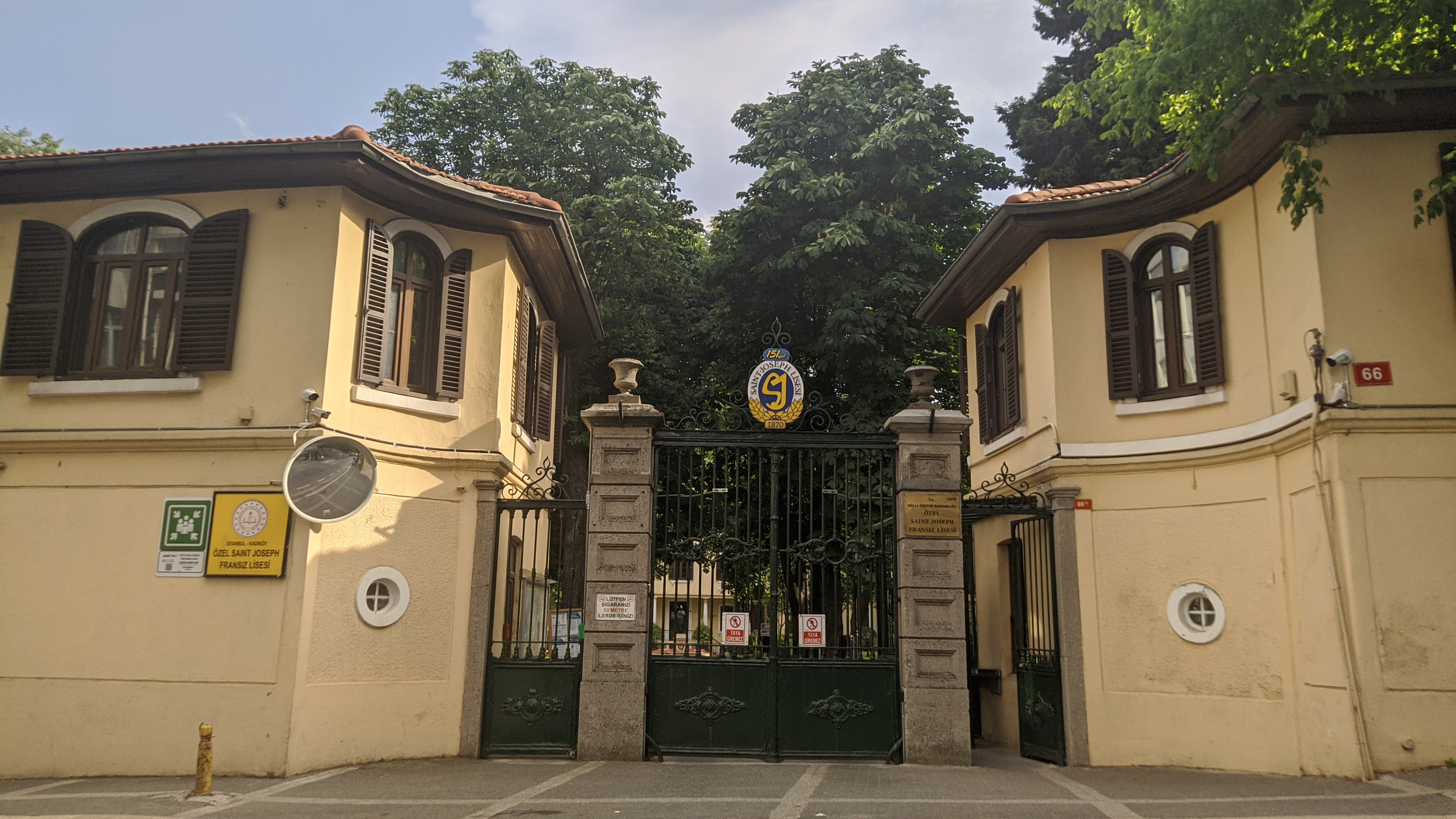

Location
- Caferağa Mahallesi; Dr. Esat Işık Caddesi No. 66/11; 34710 Kadıköy, Istanbul; Turkey
- 40°58′59″N 29°01′43″E

Information
- Type: Private
- Established: August 16, 1870; 155 years ago
- Principal: Paul Yves Georges
- Faculty: 93
- Grades: Prep, 9–12
- Gender: Co-educational
- Enrollment: 1005
- Language: Turkish, French, English
- Website: www.sj.k12.tr

Lycée Saint-Joseph (Turkish: İstanbul Özel Saint-Joseph Fransız Lisesi) is a private high school located in Istanbul, Turkey. It is a French school founded in 1870. Classes are taught in Turkish, French, and English. Fenerbahçe S.K. was formed by students of this high school.

== History ==
This school was founded by the Institute of the Brothers of the Christian Schools (De La Salle Brothers). The Catholic lay religious congregation of pontifical right for men was established by Saint Jean-Baptiste when it first came to Turkey in 1841.

Pensionnat Saint-Joseph, a school for boys, was first established in Pera, now Beyoğlu, in 1857. Its successor Frères des Ecoles Chrétiennes was established in 1860. At one time it moved to a rental property in Moda, Kadıköy but in 1864 it returned to Pera as it could no longer occupy the building, as the owner had sold it to someone else. Sultan Abdulaziz permitted for the school to build its own building in 1864, but he had to issue another declaration doing the same in 1870 as the original declaration disappeared. 16 August 1870 was the start of construction. It established a 3-hectare (7.4-acre) campus in Pera. Accordingly 1870 is listed as the founding year of the school.

The society has since opened schools in Izmir and Istanbul. Currently, the society has 7,225 members, 60,000 teachers, and 785,127 students. They have 1,800 schools in 84 different countries. The school celebrated its 50th anniversary in 1921, 100th in 1971 and 125th in 1996. In 1987, the school began to also admit girls as students.

He also rebuilt a school in Akarca that was destroyed in the August 17, 1999 earthquake. The school is called Akarca Turkish-French Brotherhood Primary School.

=== Natural Sciences Center ===
Frère Possesseur Jean and Frère Paramont-Félix founded the Natural Sciences Center (originally named the Museum of Natural Sciences) in 1910, using insects and stone fragments they had collected over the years from Turkey and around the world. Today, the museum houses 3.300 types of stones and minerals, as well as 20.000 species of insects, birds, and animals (including large animals such as wolves, deer, brown bears, and seals).

The idea for this center, now on the ground floor of the school, was born following an examination by professors from Istanbul Technical University, who were invited to assess the physical condition of the collection, and later, following remarks by experts from the National Museum of Natural History in Paris, who stated, “You have a priceless collection in your hands.” The center was designed by mathematics teacher Yaprak Bener Chapdelaine and biology teacher Laurent Chapdelaine. Xavier Filoreau spent five years restoring the pieces that were exhibited at the museum.

The center is referred to as a "center" rather than a museum because it is not affiliated with the Turkish Ministry of Culture and Tourism.

== Notable pupils ==
- Calouste Gulbenkian (1869–1955), Armenian businessman and philanthropist
- Attila Aşkar (born 1944), Turkish civil engineer
- Zehra Bilgin (born 2002), Turkish Olympian swimmer
- Fuat Güner (born 1948), Turkish musician and actor
- Enis Batur (born 1952), Turkish poet
- Aydemir Güler (born 1961), Turkish communist politician
- Tuncay Özilhan (born 1947), Turkish businessman, chairman of Anadolu Group
- Uğur Uluocak (1962–2003), Turkish mountaineer and photographer
- Cem Bölükbaşı (born 1998), Turkish racing driver
- Cem Göknar, Turkish electrical/electronics engineer

== See also ==
- List of missionary schools in Turkey
- List of high schools in Turkey
- Education in the Ottoman Empire
  - List of schools in the Ottoman Empire
