= Carlos Simmerling =

American professor of chemistry

- Citizenship: United States
- Education: University of Illinois at Chicago
- Known for: Computational Biology, Protein Structures
- Children: 2
- Scientific career
- Fields: Chemistry, Biology
- Workplaces: Stony Brook University

Carlos Simmerling is a full professor of chemistry at the State University of New York at Stony Brook. He is associate director of the Louis and Beatrice Laufer Center for Physical and Quantitative Biology. Simmerling received his Bachelor of Arts in 1991 from the University of Illinois at Chicago and then his doctorate in 1994 from the same institution. His postdoctoral work was performed at the University of California, San Francisco under the direction of Peter Kollman. His primary field of interest is computational structural biology with a focus on methods of conformational sampling and protein structure prediction. He is a member of the AMBER development team.

== Research ==
Simmerling is leading a team of researchers in the development of new algorithms and programs for accurate and efficient simulation of large biomolecular systems using state-of-the-art computers. The result is a forecast of what these molecules of life look like from their gene sequence..

The significance of Simmerling's discovery lies in the protein's shape, which dictates its function. A protein molecule acquires its shape as its long amino-acid chain folds into a compact, three-dimensional blob. While each kind of protein adopts a different fold, genome lists do not provide researchers with the structure of the folded form.

Currently researchers use laborious experimental techniques to reveal the positions of each atom in the protein, and structures have been determined for only a small fraction of known proteins. This information allows researchers to understand the protein's function, determine why genome variations can result in disease, and serves as the basis for design of drugs that modify protein function.

Researchers have long thought it possible to predict a protein's structure using computers to simulate how chains fold, knowing how amino acids tend to attract or repel one another. Because the folding process is extremely complex, however, no researchers had been able to successfully predict a protein structure from genetic data. That was before Simmerling's solution — he built a custom computer system using more than 100 PCs and developed software to directly simulate the changes that the protein undergoes while searching for its optimal fold.
