= Ross Stein =

American geophysicist

Ross S. Stein is a scientist emeritus at the United States Geological Survey in Menlo Park, California, and cofounder and CEO of Temblor, a startup intended to teach seismic hazards and reduce their risk.

== Education ==
Stein graduated magna cum laude from Brown University with a bachelor of science degree in geology in 1975. He received a Ph.D. from Stanford University in 1980; and was an Observatory Post-Doctoral Fellow at Columbia University in 1981.

== Media ==
Stein appeared in the Emmy award-nominated documentary, Killer Quake (NOVA, 1995); the four-part Great Quakes series (Discovery Channel, 1997–2001); Earthquake Storms (BBC, 2003); and the IMAX film, Forces of Nature (National Geographic Society, 2004), which he helped to write and animate. Forces was awarded best feature film of the 2004 Large Format Cinema Association Film Festival, best film and best educational film of the 2005 Giant Screen Theater Association, and Grand Prize of the 2005 La Géode International Large Format Film Festival.

== Honors ==
Stein is a Fellow of the American Geophysical Union (AGU) and of the Geological Society of America (GSA).

He is the recipient of the following AGU prizes:<ref name=Tremblor-CEO-bio/

- 2012 Gilbert White Natural Hazards Award
- 2024 Paul G. Silver Award for Outstanding Scientific Service

== Selected publications ==
- R. S. Stein, G. C. P. King and J. Lin, Stress triggering of earthquakes: evidence for the 1994 M=6.7 Northridge, California, shock, Annali di Geofisica, 37, pp. 1799–1805, 1995
- R. S. Stein, Earthquakes: Characteristic or haphazard? (News and Views), Nature, 378, pp. 443–444, 1995
- R. S. Stein, Northridge Earthquake: Which fault and what next?, Nature, 373, pp. 388–389, 1995.
- R. S. Stein, Comment on "The impact of refraction correction on leveling interpretation in Southern California", by William E. Strange, J. Geohys. Res., 89, pp. 559–561, 1984
- R. S. Stein, Coalinga's caveat, EOS, American Geophysical Union Transaction, 65, pp. 791–795, 1984
- R. S. Stein, Aerodynamics of the Pterosaur wing, Science (letter), 191, pp. 898, 1976
- Perfettini, Hugo; Stein, Ross S.; Simpson, Robert; Cocco, Massimo (September 10, 1999). "Stress transfer by the 1988–1989 M=5.3 and 5.4 Lake Elsman foreshocks to the Loma Prieta fault' Unclamping at the site of peak mainshock slip" (PDF). Journal of Geophysical Research. 104 (B9): 20, 169–20, 182. Bibcode:1999JGR...10420169P. doi:10.1029/1999jb900092. Archived from the original (PDF) on April 21, 2017.
