= Altuğ Çinici =

Turkish architect (1935–2024)

Altuğ Tanrıverdi Çinici (born Altuğ Tanrıverdi; 1935 – February 21, 2024) was a Turkish architect who graduated from the Istanbul Technical University Faculty of Architecture in 1959. She collaborated extensively with her colleague and husband, Behruz Çinici, with whom she co-founded the Çinici Architectural Office. The firm was renamed Çinici Architects in 1963. Together, they worked on numerous significant architectural projects, leaving a lasting impact on Turkish architecture.

Among her most distinguished projects are the Public Relations Building of the Turkish Parliament Quarter and the Middle East Technical University (METU) Campus. The latter commission was secured when Altuğ and Behruz Çinici's proposal won first place from the project jury. Behruz Çinici described their approach to the METU campus design as a challenge to the International Style of architecture, which was prevalent in architectural theory, education, and culture at the time. Rather than modifying the landscape to suit their design, their proposal emerged from extensive site visits and thoughtful consideration of the terrain. Following the completion of the METU campus, the Çinici firm undertook additional projects, including state commissions and educational facilities, earning multiple accolades both domestically and internationally. These awards include the Simavi Foundation Award (1985), İş Bank Award (1994), Aga Khan Award for the Mosque of the Grand National Assembly (1995), and the Architect Sinan Award (2004).

The archive of Çinici Architects, which was previously housed in the firm's architectural office in Istanbul, is currently being transferred to SALT, a Turkish institution dedicated to art, architecture, and urbanism.

Çinici died on February 21, 2024, at the age of 89. She was laid to rest in Edirnekapı Martyr's Cemetery.
