= Mehmet Gümüşburun =

Turkish chemical engineer and bureaucrat (born 1942)

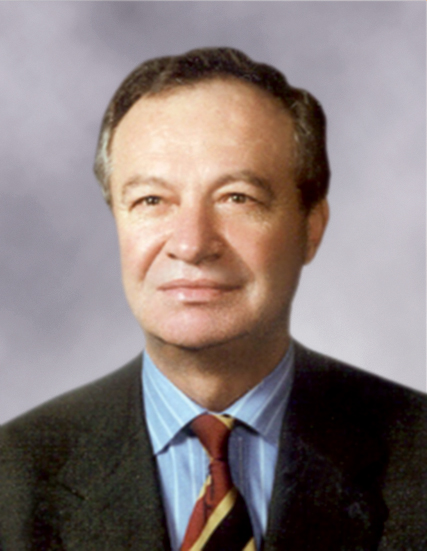
- Born: 1942 (age 83–84); Gaziantep
- Education: Istanbul Technical University
- Occupations: Bureaucrat and chemical engineer

Mehmet Gümüşburun (born 1942) is a Turkish chemical engineer and bureaucrat.

== Biography ==
Mehmet Gümüşburun was born in Gaziantep in 1942. He is a graduate of Istanbul Technical University and holds a degree in chemical engineering.

He started his career in 1967 and began to work in Gaziantep Cement Factory. He worked in different cement plants in various capacities. He was the director of Van Cement Factory from 1979 to 1982 and of Pınarhisar Cement Factory from 1982 to 1986. In 1986 he was appointed deputy director general of ÇİTOSAN, a now-defunct state-owned enterprise of cement industry in Turkey. He became director general of ÇİTOSAN in November 1987 and was in office until June 1992. He also served as the president of the Turkish Cement Producers Association (TÇMB) from 1987 and 1992.

After leaving office he worked at Yibitaş Lafarge as general coordinator from 1995 to 2000. During the same period he was also deputy president of the TÇMB. Then he worked at different companies in Turkey.
