= Attila Aşkar =

Turkish mathematician (born 1943)

- Born: September 4, 1943 (age 82); Afyonkarahisar, Turkey
- Education: St. Joseph High School, Technical University of Istanbul
- Occupation: mathematician

Attila Aşkar (born September 4, 1943) is a Turkish civil engineer, scientist and former president of the Koç University in Rumelifeneri, Istanbul, Turkey during 2001 and 2009.

== Early life and education ==
Attila Aşkar was born on September 4, 1943 in Afyonkarahisar, Turkey. He is the son of Kemal and Nüzhet Aşkar. He graduated from St. Joseph High School in Istanbul, Turkey in 1961. He received his B.Sc. in Civil Engineering from the Technical University of Istanbul in 1966, and his Ph.D. in applied and computational mathematics founded by A. Cemal Eringen under the supervision of Ahmet Çakmak at Princeton University in the United States in 1969.

== Career ==
He was the head in the department of Mathematics at Boğaziçi University, Istanbul, Turkey. After losing the Boğaziçi University rectorship elections in Boğaziçi University, he moved to Koç University's İstinye Campus in Istanbul as a professor of Mathematics and the Dean of the College of Arts and Sciences. Professor Aşkar then was appointed as the president and rector of the Koç University.

He held visiting research scientist and professor positions at universities including Brown University, Princeton University, Paris University VI, the Max-Planck Institute in Göttingen, Germany and the Royal Institute of Technology in Stockholm, Sweden.

Aşkar's recent research interests included scattering of classical and quantum waves, wavelet analysis and molecular dynamics. He is the author of over eighty research journal articles and two books.

He received recognitions, which include the Junior Scientist and Science awards of the National Research Council (TÜBİTAK), the Information Age Award of the Ministry of Culture, and entry to the Turkish Academy of Sciences.

== Personal life ==
Attila Aşkar was married to Elsie Vance, the daughter of former Secretary of State Cyrus R. Vance on August 30, 1998. Aşkar is also on the board of directors at the Center for Excellence in Education, a non-profit organization located in McLean, Virginia.

== Selected publications ==
- A. Aşkar, A. Çakmak, and H. Rabitz, Nodal structure and global behavior of scattering wave functions, J. Chem. Phys., 72, 5287, DOI: 10.1063/1.439739, (1980)
- M. Duff, H. Rabitz, A. Aşkar, A. Çakmak, and M. Ablowitz, A Comparison Between Finite Element Methods and Spectral Methods as Applied to Bound State Problems, J. Chem. Phys., 72, 1543, DOI: 10.1063/1.439381, (1980)
- A. Aşkar, A. S. Çakmak, and H. Rabitz, Finite Element Methods for Reactive Scattering, Chem. Phys., 33, 367, DOI: 10.1016/0301-0104(78)87134-1, (1978)
- H. Rabitz, A. Aşkar, and A. S. Çakmak, The Use of Global Wavefunctions in Scattering Theory, Chem. Phys., 29, 61, DOI: 10.1016/0301-0104(78)85061-7, (1978)
- Lattice Dynamical Foundations of Continuum Theories: Elasticity, Piezoelectricity... (Series in Theoretical and Applied Mechanics, Vol 2)
