= Tamek =

Turkish food company

TAMEK
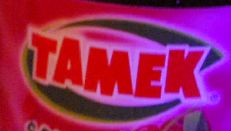
- TAMEK logo on a bottle of their Sour Cherry Nectar
- Type: A.Ş.
- Industry: Food and Beverage
- Founded: 1955; 71 years ago Bursa-Demirtaş, Turkey
- Founders: Mehmet Sipahioglu
- Headquarters: Istanbul, Turkey
- Products: Jam, Fruit juice etc.
- Website: www.tamek.com.tr/en/

TAMEK is a Turkish food and beverage company founded in 1955. It is a pioneer in the Turkish food sector. They are the first producers of tomato paste and ketchup in all Turkey. They are also the first Turkish producer of many other canned foods.

== History ==
Tamek was founded in Demirtaş village of Osmangazi district of Bursa Province on March 31, 1955. The name consists of the initials of the Turkish German Fruit Extracts Company. It was founded by Mehmet Sipahioglu in cooperation with a German partner, who left after a year, making TAMEK 100% Turkish from then on. Tamek was the first producer of ketchup in Turkey, making the product available to consumers in 1958.

In 1959, Tamek was the first producer of ready to eat food and stuffed vegetables in Turkey. Tamek's famous brown bottle fruit juice was created in their first plant in Demirtaş, Bursa in 1963. The first boiled and canned legume in Turkey were produced by TAMEK in 1974. In 1987, they started the production of several products in their Karacabey, Bursa plant. These included paste, canned foods, pea, jam, fruit concentrate and marmalade. Diabetic jam in Turkey was also first produced by TAMEK in 1992. In 1993, the first canned fruit juice was available in Turkey thanks to TAMEK. Production started in the plant at Kızıksa town of Manyas district in Balıkesir Province in 1994, where they started producing tomato paste, fruit concentrate, ketchup and mayonnaise. The first paste packed in a cardboard box was made available in Turkey by TAMEK in 2000. In 2001, TAMEK's first plant in Demirtaş was converted into a facility producing solely fruit juice. In 2002, the plant in Salihli of Manisa Province started production, and its products were paste, boiled food, ready to eat food, stuffed vegetables, canned okra and fruit concentrates. Also in 2002, TAMEK sold the beverage brand Fruko. to PepsiCo. In 2005, the first 'Body Sleeve' packaging was used in ketchup and mayonnaise. In 2006, TAMEK started production of Turkey's first additive-free and preservative-free products. In 2014, TAMEK was the first user of Crystal Tetrapacks for their fruit juices in Turkey. In 2017, TAMEK started to produce their fruit juice on their signature brown bottles again.

== Current Events ==
TAMEK sent food aid to Soma following the Soma mine disaster. The food items, totaling 25 tonnes and worth ₺ 30 million, were given to the Soma office of the Kizilay humanitarian organization.

TAMEK is the 2nd most consumed juice brand in Edirne coming in at 19.8% of the consumption.

== Sources ==
- FOROUGH HESAMI GHAHRAMANLOU (2014). "5" (Master's Thesis). NEXT GENERATION OF EMERGING MARKETS, EXPORT POSSIBILITIES OF TURKISH FRUIT JUICE AND CONCENTRATE TO LIBYA (Report). Istanbul: Bahçeşehir University. p. 28.
- "Tamek Gida Ve Konsantre San Ve Tic As". wabel.com. WABEL ONLINE. "TAMEK Food & Concentrate was founded in 1955, exports to over 70 countries worldwide. Headquarter is located in Istanbul and has three factories where below product groups are produced:•Tomato & Pepper Pastes•Jam & Marmalades•Ready to eat meals•Canned Vegetables•Ketchup and Mayonnaise•Stewed pulses•Fruit juice concentrates & Fruit juices"
- Sebnem Burnaz; Y. Ilker Topcu (8 July 2003). A MULTI-CRITERIA DECISION MODEL FOR TURKISH SOFT DRINK INDUSTRY (PDF) (Report). Honolulu/Maçka: Istanbul Technical University, Management Faculty. p. 3. S2CID 18165257. Archived from the original (PDF) on 2017-10-16.
