= Van Çimento Sanayii =

- Native name: Van Aşkale Çimento Fabrikası
- Industry: Cement
- Founded: Van, Turkey (1969; 57 years ago
- Headquarters: Van, Turkey
- Key people: Nihat Kılıç (General director)
- Owner: Aşkale Holdings
- Parent: Aşkale Holdings
- Website: Official website

Van Çimento Sanayii, Van Cement in English, is a cement factory located in Van, Turkey.

== History and profile ==
Van Çimento Sanayi was established in 1969 as a state-owned cement factory and was attached to the Cement Industry (Çimento Sanayi Endüstrisi in Turkish). It remained as a state asset until 1996 when it was privatized. From 1996 to 2004 it was owned by the Rumeli Holdings. From 2006 to 2008 its owner was Orascom, and it was Lafarge from 2008 to 2009. Then it was sold to its current owner, Aşkale Holdings, in September 2009.

From 1979 to 1982 Mehmet Gümüşburun was the director of the factory. The current general director of the factory is Nihat Kılıç. As of July 2013, the annual production capacity of the factory was 2 million tonnes.
