= Istanbul Technical University Faculty of Architecture =

University faculty in Istanbul, Turkey

- İstanbul Teknik Üniversitesi Mimarlık Fakültesi
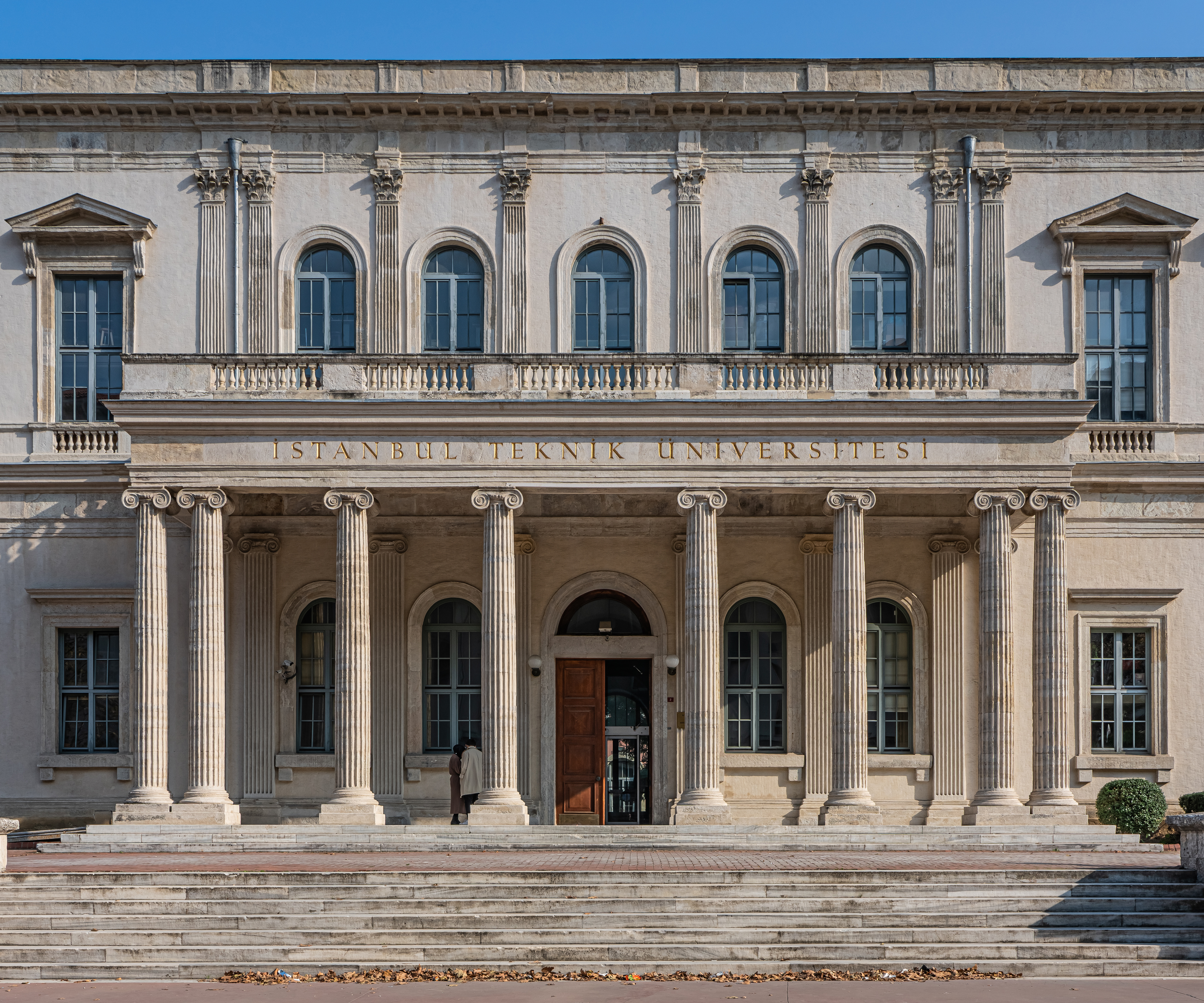
- Type: Public
- Established: 1884; 142 years ago as Hendese-i Mülkiye
- Dean: Prof. Dr. Hayriye EŞBAH TUNÇAY
- Location: Istanbul, Turkey
- Campus: Urban
- Website: mim.itu.edu.tr

ITU Faculty of Architecture, located in the historical Taşkışla building in Beyoğlu, was the first institution within the Ottoman Empire dedicated to architectural education. The Department of Architecture is recognized for its substantial equivalence to similar programs in the United States. Over the years, the school has been home to several renowned faculty members, including Ord. Prof. Emin Onat, Prof. Paul Bonatz, Prof. Said Kuran, Prof. Mukbil Gökdoğan, Prof. Kemal Ahmet Aru, Prof. Clemens Holzmeister, Prof. Gustav Olsner, Prof. Rudolf Belling, and Prof. Orhan Arda. The School of Architecture comprises five departments: Architecture, Industrial Design, Interior Architecture, Landscape Architecture, and Urban and Regional Planning. This setup enables a comprehensive approach to architectural and design education by integrating various disciplines.

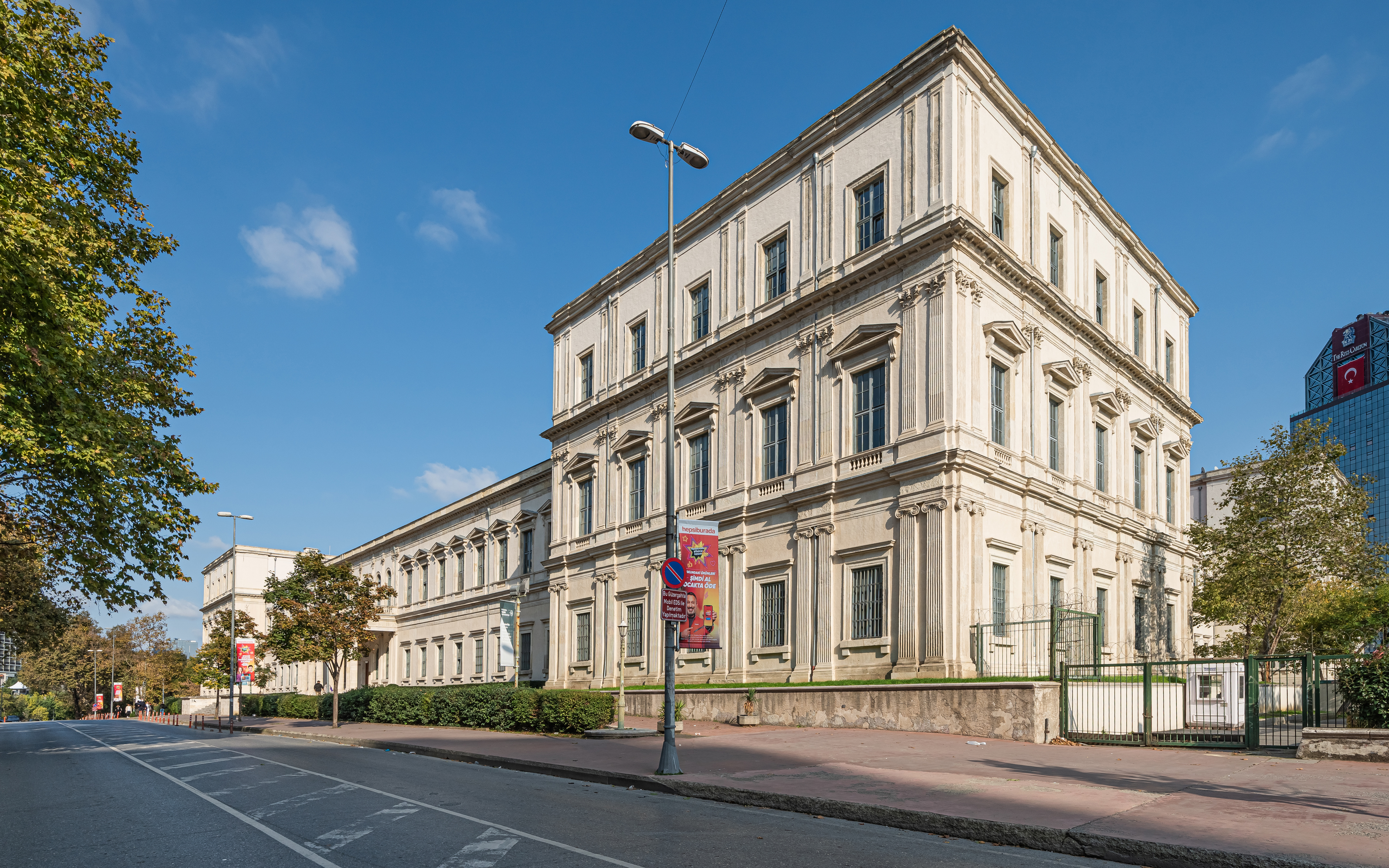
ITU Faculty of Architecture building, Taşkışla

== Notable alumni ==
- Ord. Prof. Emin Halid Onat
- Prof. Ahmet Orhan Arda
- Behruz Çinici
- Altuğ Çinici
