= Cem Göknar =

Turkish electrical engineer

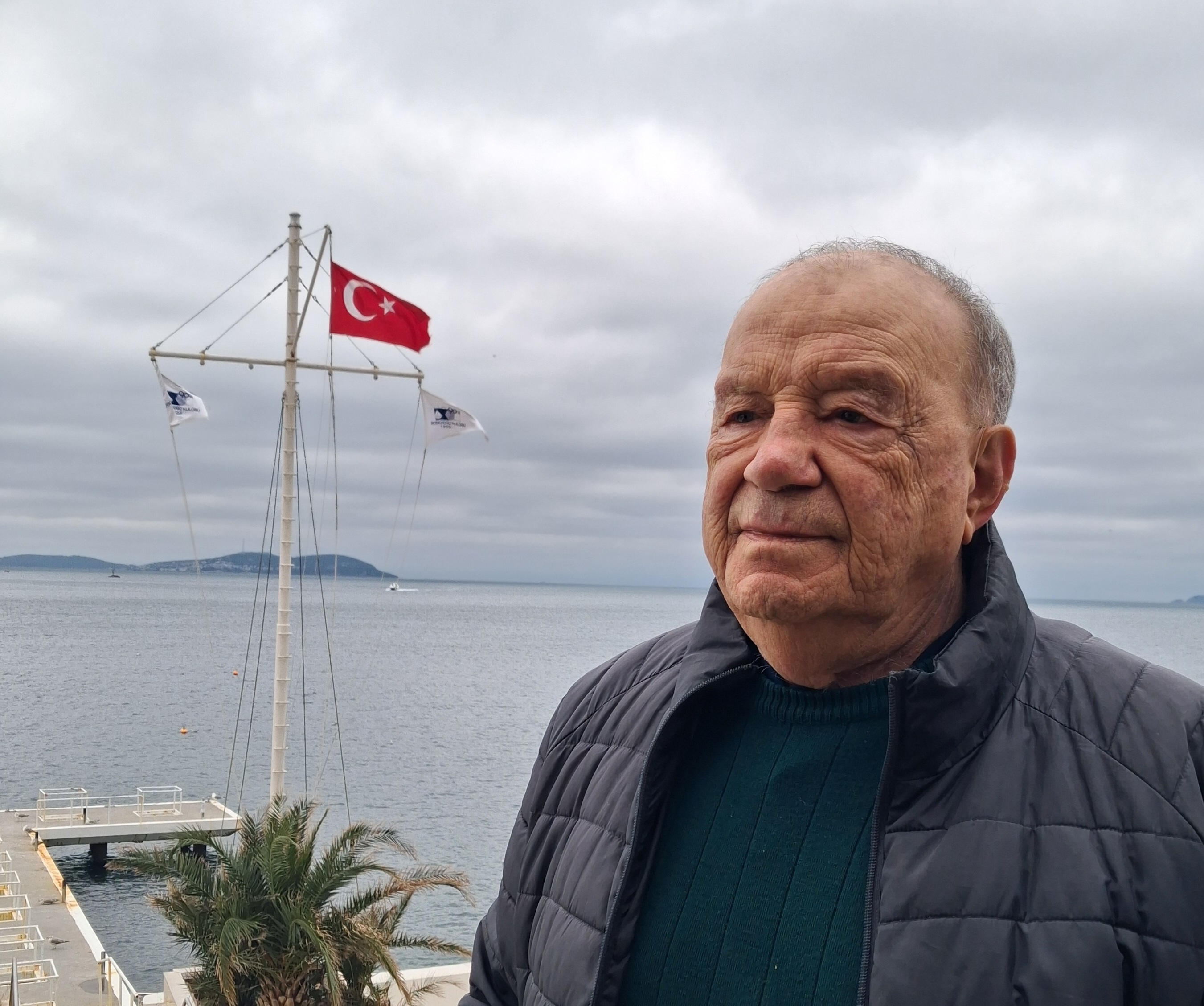
- Cem Göknar (2026)
- Born: Istanbul
- Occupations: Electrical engineer and professor

Academic background
- Education: Master of Science at Istanbul Technical University; Ph.D. at Michigan State University
- Alma mater: Michigan State University
- Thesis: State Space Axioms and State Descriptions in Canonical Form (1969)

Academic work
- Discipline: Electrical engineering
- Sub-discipline: Circuits and systems

İzzet Cem (Cem) Göknar (birthplace: Istanbul) is a Turkish electrical/electronics engineer and Emeritus Professor in the Department of Electrical and Electronics Engineering at Işık University in Istanbul.

== Education ==
Göknar completed his highschool at the Lycée Saint-Joseph in Istanbul (1958). He then earned his masters of science degree (1963) at Istanbul Technical University in Turkey. He completed a Ph.D. in Electrical Engineering (1969) at Michigan State University in the United States, with a dissertation on 'State Space Axioms and State Descriptions in Canonical Form'.

== Career ==
=== International ===
In the United States, Göknar conducted research and taught at Michigan State University and as a visiting professor at the University of California, Berkeley; at the University of Illinois at Urbana-Champaign; in Canada at the University of Waterloo; and in Denmark at the Technical University of Denmark. He also gave invited lectures at European Universities such as Universities of Pavia, Lisbon, and Brno.

He was the chairman of International conferences ICECS and ECCTD; and editor of International Journal of Circuit Theory & Applications.

=== Istanbul Technical University ===
Göknar's career has included long service at Istanbul Technical University (ITU) in Turkey, by being instrumental in the transition of Circuit Theory Chair into Circuits and Systems Chair, where he stood as the basis of Turkey's advanced level research activities after Tarik Özker – 'The father of Modern Circuit Theory in Turkey' – had introduced the discipline in the country. Göknar raised at the ITU to full professor, alongside senior administrative roles such as vice-dean and department leadership, and multiple visiting professorships abroad, including UC Berkeley in California, the University of Waterloo in Canada, and the University of Illinois at Urbana–Champaign in Illinois. He took his retirement from ITU in 2000.

Aside his work at the ITU, in Turkey, he taught courses and supervised theses at Karadeniz Technical University and Boğaziçi University.

=== Doğuş university ===
Upon his retirement from ITU Göknar was appointed as professor at Doğuş University in Turkey to the Department of Computer Engineering, with the purpose of founding the Department of Electronics and Communications which he achieved in 2001. While at Doğuş he contributed to major conferences and professional-service responsibilities within the circuits and systems community.

He took up, from 2004, the task of chief editor of the Doğus University Journal.

At the ECCTD 2009 held in Istanbul, Göknar organized а special session devoted to Mirko Milić (1932–1993), founder of Circuit Theory in former Yugoslavia.

In the capacity of head of Doğuş University ECED, he attended in 2012 the Turkish regional Meeting of Student Branches in Istanbul, where he delivered a speech about the history of IEEE and achievements of the Circuits and Systems Society.

In 2015, Göknar invented the metamutator which he introduced at the opening speech of CEEIT2017 in Dubai, UAE. Terminated properly, this device is able to synthesize various electronic devices such as mutators, memristors, filters, and PID controllers.

=== Işık University ===
From September 2015 onwards, Göknar is affiliated with Işık University in Turkey, where he served for two years as Director of the Institute of Science and Engineering. There, he invented the 'Analog Addition-Subtraction 4-Port Integrated Circuit' (AD-IC), an analogue integrated circuit consisting of add-differentiate gates built with twelve transistor and capable of realizing many devices which contribute to analogue signal processing and circuit design technology.

== Publications (selection) ==
Göknar has published various articles and conference papers abroad and in Turkey. Some of his publications include;

- 1995: (as editor) ECCTD '95: proceedings of the 12th European Conference on Circuits Theory and Design : İstanbul, Turkey, 27-31 August 1995. Istanbul Technical University. ISBN 978-975-561-062-7.
- 2004: Complex Computing Networks / Brain-like and Wave-oriented Electrodynamic Algorithms. Springer-Verlag Berlin Heidelberg. Göknar co-authored this work with Levent Sevgi.
- 2005: Opening address of the 4th International Electrical, Electronics and Computer Engineering Congress (eleco 2005) in Turkey, later published in the magazine of the Chamber of Electrical Engineers of Turkey. In this address, Göknar examined global shifts in engineering education and technological competitiveness. He compared developments in the United States, China, India, Europe, and Turkey, addressing issues such as the scale of engineering and doctoral education, outsourcing, and research and development. He argued that sustained investment in universities, academic independence, and human capital is essential for long-term innovation and economic strength, and that technological leadership cannot be maintained through short-term economic measures alone.

== Recognitions ==
- NATO Senior Scientist Grant and the Minna-James-Heineman-Stiftung Award, received in recognition of his publications and research.
- Fellow of the IEEE “for contributions to the analysis, simulation and synthesis of nonlinear networks”. Later, Göknars fellowship status was raised to the status of IEEE Life Fellow.
- Fellow of the International Academy of Artificial Intelligence Sciences (AAIS), conferred for significant and sustained contributions to artificial-intelligence research and scientific leadership.
