= Behruz Çinici =

Turkish architect (1932–2011)

- Born: 1932; Kadıköy, Istanbul, Turkey
- Died: 18 October 2011 (aged 78–79)
- Education: Vefa High School; Istanbul Technical University
- Occupation: Architect
- Spouse: Altuğ Çinici

Veli Behruz Çinici (1932 – October 18, 2011) was a Turkish architect.

== Early life ==
Behruz Çinici completed his secondary education at Vefa High School in 1949 and graduated from the Faculty of Architecture at Istanbul Technical University in 1954.

== Career ==
Behruz Çinici served as a lecturer at Istanbul Technical University from 1954 to 1961. He established his first workshop in Istanbul in 1954 in collaboration with Ayhan Tayman. His early career was marked by several significant achievements, including winning the Atatürk University Campus Planning Competition in 1956, alongside Enver Tokay, Hayati Tabanlıoğlu, and Ayhan Tayman.

Çinici continued to garner accolades with first prize wins for several major architectural projects: the Ankara Petrol Ofisi Management Building in 1957 with Ayhan Tayman, the Ankara State Hydraulic Works General Directorate Building in 1958 with Enver Tokay and Teoman Doruk, and the Istanbul Eminönü Bazaar Center and Office Complex in 1959. These projects were conducted independently of the DSI General Directorate Building.

In 1960, Çinici began a professional partnership with his wife, Altuğ Çinici. Their collaboration led to a first-place victory in the Middle East Technical University (METU) Campus Competition in 1961. Subsequently, they relocated their workshop to Ankara in 1962, where Çinici focused primarily on designing structures for the METU campus until 1980.

== Projects ==
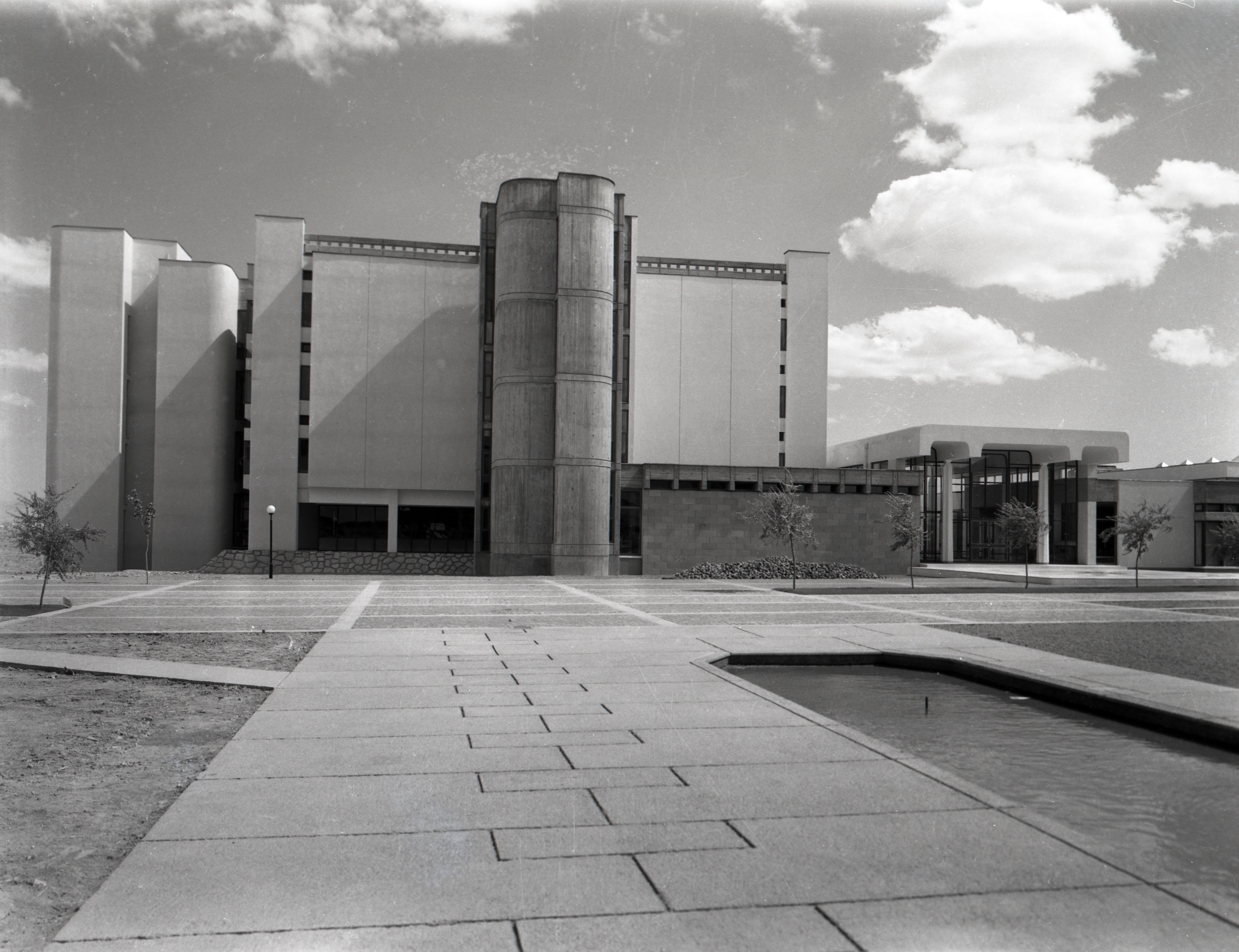
METU Library, 1961-1980

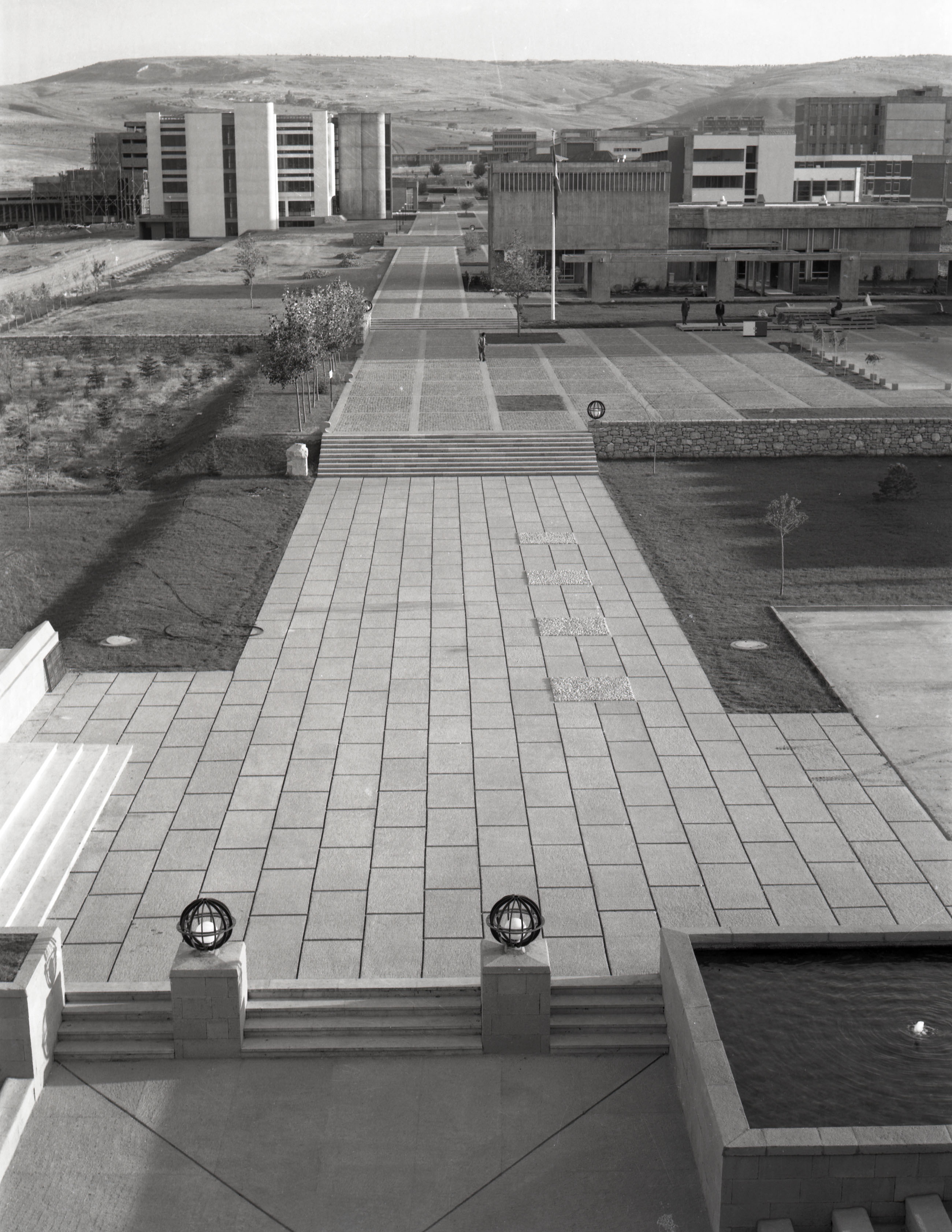
METU campus is an example of brutalist architecture designed by Behruz Çinici.

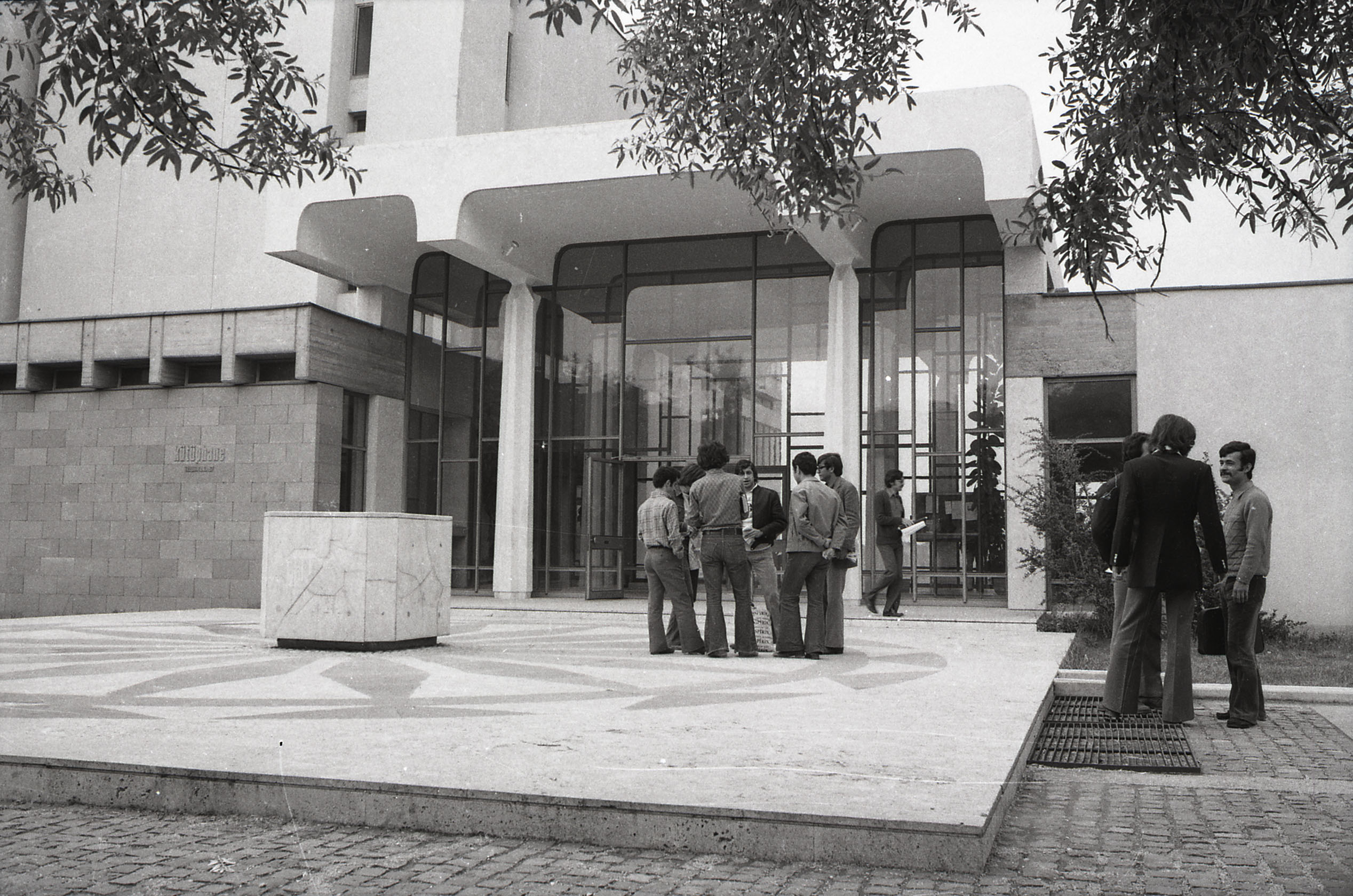
METU Library Building, 1961-1980

- During their work on the Middle East Technical University (METU) campus in Ankara from 1961 to 1980, Behruz Çinici and Altuğ Çinici utilized the 'piece construction' system. This approach features structural components that are both divisive in design and inclusive in installation functions. Instead of opting for easily damaged coatings, they frequently selected durable, often uncoated materials. The Çinici duo pioneered the use of bare concrete techniques in Turkey, first developed at the METU campus. The faculties they designed include the Faculty of Administrative Sciences, Faculty of Architecture, Faculty of Science, Faculty of Education, Faculty of Engineering, and Faculty of Agriculture.
- Turkish Grand National Assembly Mosque Complex (1986–1989): This mosque complex is uniquely integrated into the sloping terrain of the site. The design is notable for its transparency toward the qibla wall, and it distinguishes itself by lacking both a dome and a minaret, which are traditional elements in mosque architecture. In recognition of its unique architectural approach, the complex was awarded the Aga Khan Award in 1995.
- Diyarbakir University Campus Planning, Diyarbakır (1970)
- Binevler Housing, Çorum (1971)
- Capa Holiday Village Project, Muğla (1971)
- Iran Embassy School, Ankara (1975)
- TBMM Public Relations Building, Ankara (1978)
- Kızılay General Directorate Building Competition Project, Ankara (1980)
- Yacht Harbour and Marina Hotel Project, Tripoli (1982)
- Naciye Sultan Complex, Istanbul (1983)
- TBMM Housing Complex, Ankara (1984)
- Soyak Complex, Istanbul (1986)
- International Taksim Square Arrangement Competition, Istanbul (1987)
- Selimiye Environment Arrangement, Istanbul (1988)
- Platin Complex, Istanbul (1993)
- Alka Complex, Istanbul (1993)
