= Louis and Beatrice Laufer Center for Physical and Quantitative Biology =

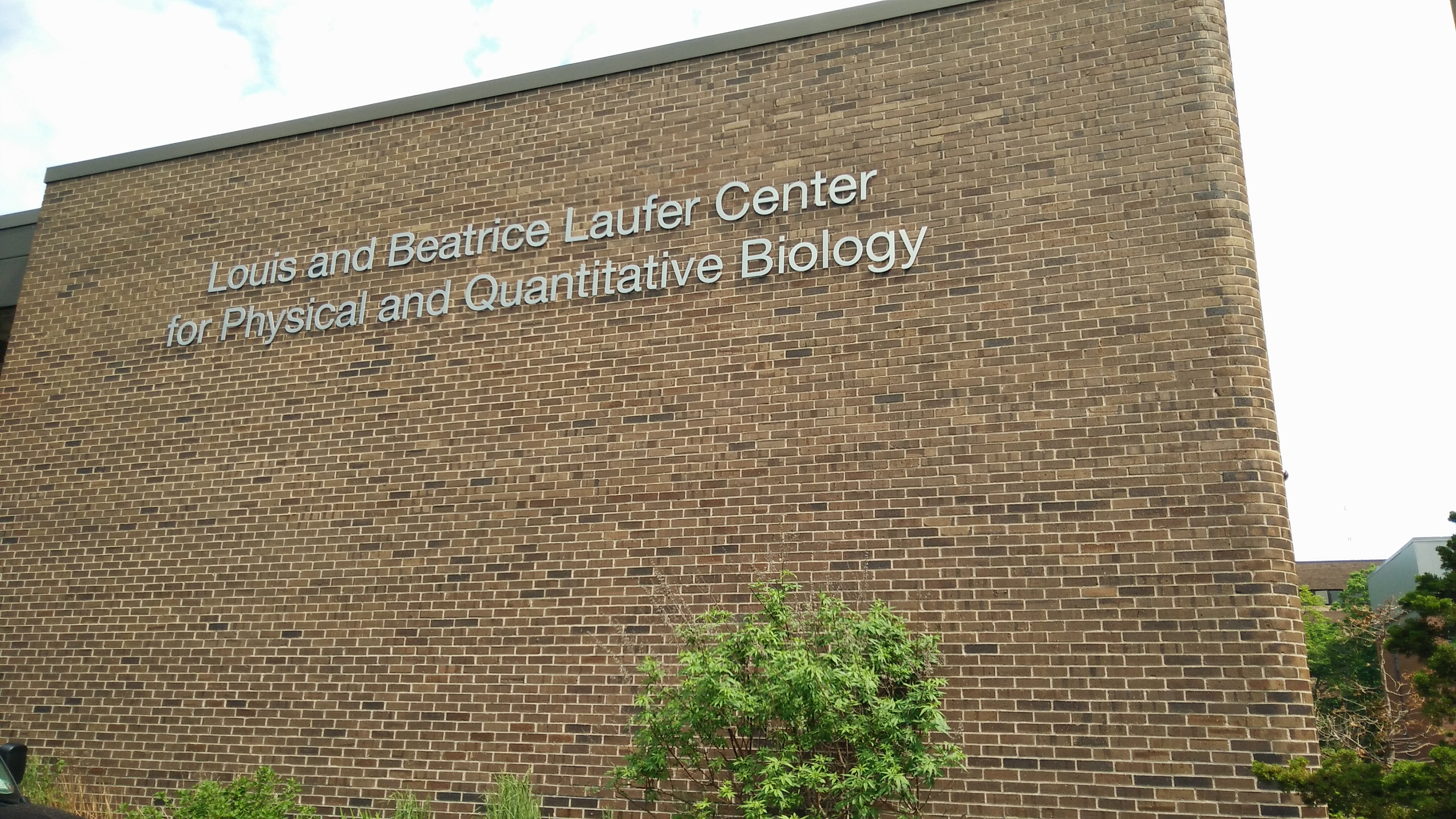
- Laufer Center Front Wall
- Established: 2008
- Focus: Biophysics; Biology; Biochemistry; Chemistry; Drug Discovery; Computer science Synthetic biology Engineering; Evolution; Genetics; Mathematics; Physics
- Key people: Dr. Ivet Bahar (Director); Dr. Ken A. Dill (Founding Director); Dr. Carlos Simmerling (Associate Director); Dr. Gábor Balázsi (Endowed Professor); Dr. Eugene Serebryany (faculty)

The Louis and Beatrice Laufer Center for Physical and Quantitative Biology (Laufer Center) is a multidisciplinary venue where research from fields such as biology, biochemistry, chemistry, computer science, engineering, genetics, mathematics, and physics come together and target medical and biological problems using both computations and experiments. The Laufer Center is part of Stony Brook University. The Center's current director is Dr. Ivet Bahar, Louis & Beatrice Laufer Endowed Chair, and Professor at the Department of Biochemistry and Cell Biology of Stony Brook University. Other faculty members include: Founding Director and Laufer Family Endowed Chair, Dr. Ken A. Dill, Associate Director, Dr. Carlos Simmerling, Henry Laufer Endowed Professor, Dr. Gábor Balázsi, Assistant Professor, Dr. Eugene Serebryany, and affiliated faculty from the Departments of Chemistry, Physics, Applied Mathematics, Pharmacology, Biomedical Engineering, Microbiology & Immunology, Ecology & Evolution and Computer Science at Stony Brook University, as well as from Brookhaven National Laboratory and Cold Spring Harbor Laboratory. Among the Laufer Center's goals is to enhance interdisciplinary education at Stony Brook University. Dr. Gábor Balázsi coordinates the flagship course of the Center, Physical and Quantitative Biology, which is offered each Fall through the Departments of Physics, Chemistry and Biomedical Engineering.

== History ==
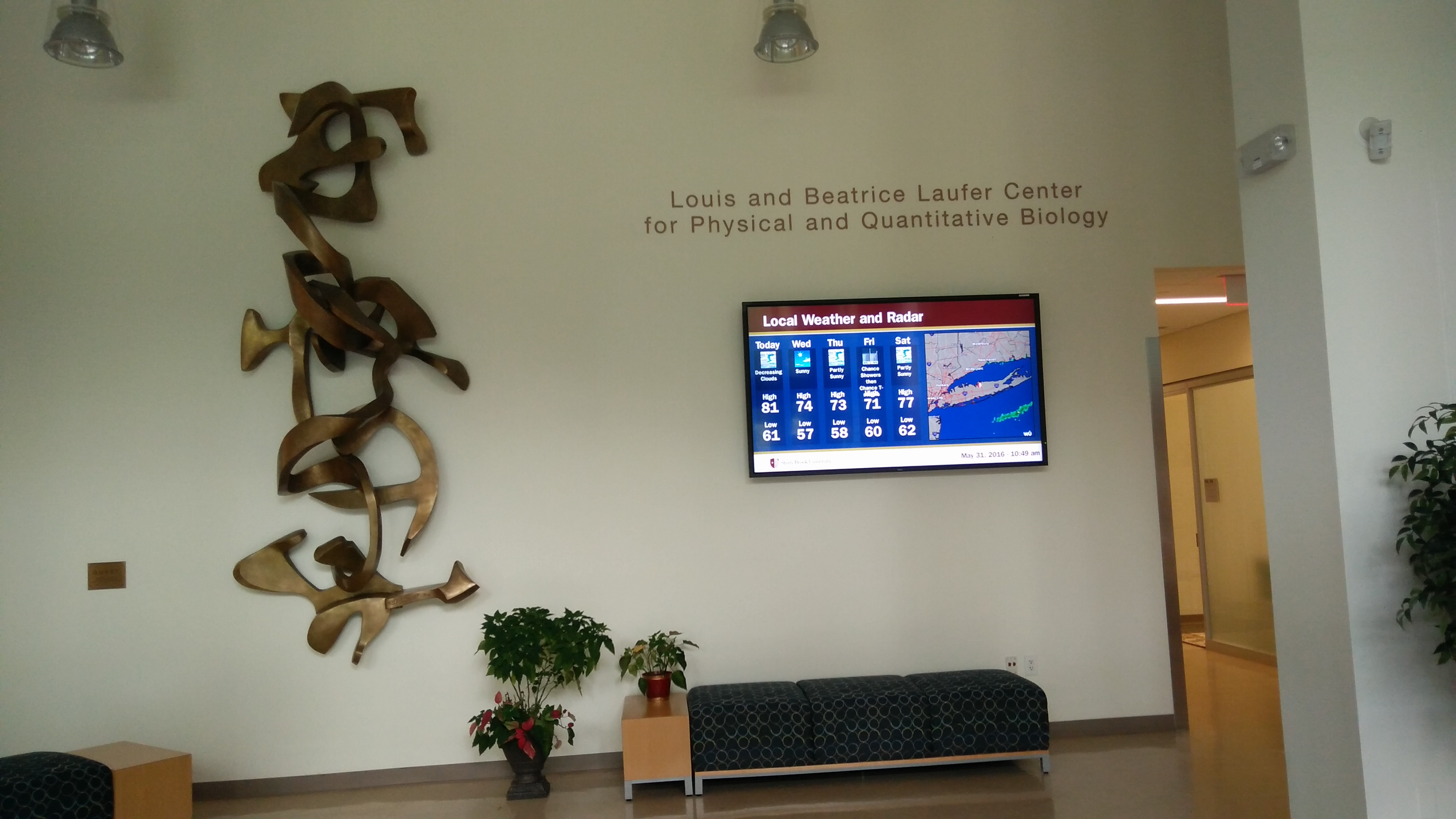
Laufer Center Main Entrance

The center was founded in 2008 by a gift from Drs. Henry Laufer, Marsha Laufer and their family in memory of Louis and Beatrice Laufer. On May 7, 2012 the Laufer Center opened with a ribbon-cutting ceremony.
