= Gaussian network model =

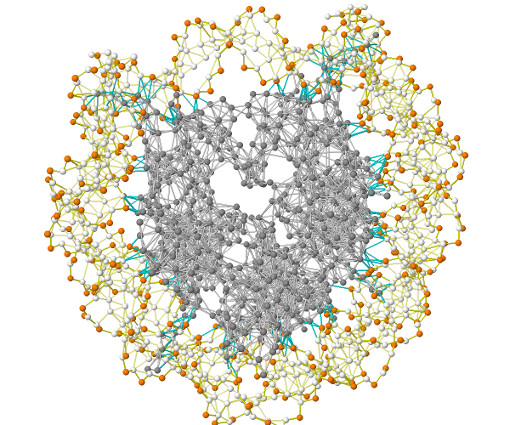
Figure 1: Gaussian network model (GNM) representation of the nucleosome core particle (PDB id: 1KX4). The beads/nodes represent the residues (amino acids, gray; and nucleotides at their P (orange), C4'- and C2-atoms (white). The nodes are connected by elastic springs (light-gray for protein intramolecular, yellow for DNA/RNA intramolecular, and cyan (protein-DNA intermolecular).

The Gaussian network model (GNM) is a representation of a biological macromolecule as an elastic mass-and-spring network to study, understand, and characterize the mechanical aspects of its long-time large-scale dynamics. The model has a wide range of applications from small proteins such as enzymes composed of a single domain, to large macromolecular assemblies such as a ribosome or a viral capsid. Protein domain dynamics plays key roles in a multitude of molecular recognition and cell signalling processes. Protein domains, connected by intrinsically disordered flexible linker domains, induce long-range allostery via protein domain dynamics. The resultant dynamic modes cannot be generally predicted from static structures of either the entire protein or individual domains.

The Gaussian network model is a minimalist, coarse-grained approach to study biological molecules. In the model, proteins are represented by nodes corresponding to α-carbons of the amino acid residues. Similarly, DNA and RNA structures are represented with one to three nodes for each nucleotide. The model uses the harmonic approximation to model interactions. This coarse-grained representation makes the calculations computationally inexpensive.

At the molecular level, many biological phenomena, such as catalytic activity of an enzyme, occur within the range of nano- to millisecond timescales. All atom simulation techniques, such as molecular dynamics simulations, rarely reach microsecond trajectory length, depending on the size of the system and accessible computational resources. Normal mode analysis in the context of GNM, or elastic network (EN) models in general, provides insights on the longer-scale functional dynamic behaviors of macromolecules. Here, the model captures native state functional motions of a biomolecule at the cost of atomic detail. The inference obtained from this model is complementary to atomic detail simulation techniques.

Another model for protein dynamics based on elastic mass-and-spring networks is the Anisotropic Network Model.

== Gaussian network model theory ==
Figure 2: Schematic representation of nodes in elastic network of GNM. Every node is connected to its spatial neighbors by uniform springs. Distance vector between two nodes, i and j, is shown by an arrow and labeled R_{ij}. Equilibrium positions of the ith and jth nodes, R^{0}_{i} and R^{0}_{j}, are shown in xyz coordinate system. R^{0}_{ij} is the equilibrium distance between nodes i and j. Instantaneous fluctuation vectors, ΔR_{i} and ΔR_{j}, and instantaneous distance vector, R_{ij}, are shown by the dashed arrows.

The Gaussian network model was proposed by Bahar, Atilgan, Haliloglu and Erman in 1997. The GNM is often analyzed using normal mode analysis, which offers an analytical formulation and unique solution for each structure. The GNM normal mode analysis differs from other normal mode analyses in that it is exclusively based on inter-residue contact topology, influenced by the theory of elasticity of Flory and the Rouse model and does not take the three-dimensional directionality of motions into account.

=== Representation of structure as an elastic network ===
Figure 2 shows a schematic view of elastic network studied in GNM. Metal beads represent the nodes in this Gaussian network (residues of a protein) and springs represent the connections between the nodes (covalent and non-covalent interactions between residues). For nodes i and j, equilibrium position vectors, R^{0}_{i} and R^{0}_{j}, equilibrium distance vector, R^{0}_{ij}, instantaneous fluctuation vectors, ΔR_{i} and ΔR_{j}, and instantaneous distance vector, R_{ij}, are shown in Figure 2. Instantaneous position vectors of these nodes are defined by R_{i} and R_{j}. The difference between equilibrium position vector and instantaneous position vector of residue i gives the instantaneous fluctuation vector, ΔR_{i} = R_{i} - R^{0}_{i}. Hence, the instantaneous fluctuation vector between nodes i and j is expressed as ΔR_{ij} = ΔR_{j} - ΔR_{i} = R_{ij} - R^{0}_{ij}.

=== Potential of the Gaussian network ===
The potential energy of the network in terms of ΔR_{i} is

$$V_{GNM} = \frac{\gamma}{2}\left[ \sum_{i,j}^{N} (\Delta R_j-\Delta R_i)^2 \right]=
\frac{\gamma}{2}\left[ \sum_{i,j}^{N}  \Delta R_i \Gamma_{ij} \Delta R_j\right]$$

where γ is a force constant uniform for all springs and Γ_{ij} is the ijth element of the Kirchhoff (or connectivity) matrix of inter-residue contacts, Γ, defined by

$$\Gamma_{ij} = \left\{\begin{matrix}
-1, & \mbox{if } i \ne j & \mbox{and }R_{ij} \le r_c  \\
0, & \mbox{if } i \ne j & \mbox{and }R_{ij} > r_c  \\
-\sum_{j,j \ne i}^{N} \Gamma_{ij}, & \mbox{if } i = j \end{matrix}\right.$$

r_{c} is a cutoff distance for spatial interactions and taken to be 7 Å for amino acid pairs (represented by their α-carbons).

Expressing the X, Y and Z components of the fluctuation vectors ΔR_{i} as ΔX^{T} = [ΔX_{1} ΔX_{2} ..... ΔX_{N}], ΔY^{T} = [ΔY_{1} ΔY_{2} ..... ΔY_{N}], and ΔZ^{T} = [ΔZ_{1} ΔZ_{2} ..... ΔZ_{N}], above equation simplifies to

$$V_{GNM} = \frac{\gamma}{2} [\Delta X^T\Gamma \Delta X + \Delta Y^T\Gamma \Delta Y + \Delta Z^T\Gamma \Delta Z]$$

=== Statistical mechanics foundations ===
In the GNM, the probability distribution of all fluctuations, P(ΔR) is isotropic

$$P(\Delta R)=P(\Delta X,\Delta Y,\Delta Z)=p(\Delta X)p(\Delta Y)p(\Delta Z)$$

and Gaussian

$$p(\Delta X)\propto \exp\left\{ -\frac{\gamma}{2 k_B T} \Delta X^T\Gamma \Delta X  \right\}=\exp\left\{ -\frac{1}{2} \left(\Delta X^T\left( \frac{k_B T}{\gamma} \Gamma^{-1} \right)^{-1} \Delta X \right) \right\}$$

where k_{B} is the Boltzmann constant and T is the absolute temperature. p(ΔY) and p(ΔZ) are expressed similarly. N-dimensional Gaussian probability density function with random variable vector x, mean vector μ and covariance matrix Σ is

$$W(x,\mu ,\Sigma ) = \frac{1}{\sqrt{(2\pi)^N |\Sigma|}} \exp\left\{ -\frac{1}{2} (x - \mu)^T \Sigma^{-1} (x - \mu) \right\}$$

$\sqrt{(2\pi)^N |\Sigma|}$ normalizes the distribution and |Σ| is the determinant of the covariance matrix.

Similar to Gaussian distribution, normalized distribution for ΔX^{T} = [ΔX_{1} ΔX_{2} ..... ΔX_{N}] around the equilibrium positions can be expressed as

$$p(\Delta X ) = \frac{1}{\sqrt{(2\pi)^N \frac{k_B T}{\gamma} |\Gamma^{-1}|}} \exp\left\{ -\frac{1}{2} \left(\Delta X^T\left( \frac{k_B T}{\gamma} \Gamma^{-1} \right)^{-1} \Delta X \right) \right\}$$

The normalization constant, also the partition function Z_{X}, is given by

$$Z_X = \int_0^\infty \exp\left\{ -\frac{1}{2} \left(\Delta X^T\left( \frac{k_B T}{\gamma} \Gamma^{-1} \right)^{-1} \Delta X \right) \right\}d\Delta X$$

where $\frac{k_B T}{\gamma} \Gamma^{-1}$ is the covariance matrix in this case. Z_{Y} and Z_{Z} are expressed similarly. This formulation requires inversion of the Kirchhoff matrix. In the GNM, the determinant of the Kirchhoff matrix is zero, hence calculation of its inverse requires eigenvalue decomposition. Γ^{−1} is constructed using the N-1 non-zero eigenvalues and associated eigenvectors. Expressions for p(ΔY) and p(ΔZ) are similar to that of p(ΔX). The probability distribution of all fluctuations in GNM becomes

$$P(\Delta R) = p(\Delta X) p(\Delta Y) p(\Delta Z)=\frac{1}{{Z_X}{Z_Y}{Z_Z}}  \exp\left\{ -\frac{3}{2} \left(\Delta X^T\left( \frac{k_B T}{\gamma} \Gamma^{-1} \right)^{-1} \Delta X \right) \right\}$$

For this mass and spring system, the normalization constant in the preceding expression is the overall GNM partition function, Z_{GNM},

$$Z_{GNM} = {Z_X}{Z_Y}{Z_Z} = {(2\pi)^{3N/2} \Biggl|{\frac{k_{B}T}{\gamma}{\Gamma^{-1}}}\Biggr|}^{3/2}$$

=== Expectation values of fluctuations and correlations ===
The expectation values of residue fluctuations, <ΔR_{i}^{2}> (also called mean-square fluctuations, MSFs), and their cross-correlations, <ΔR_{i} · ΔR_{j}> can be organized as the diagonal and off-diagonal terms, respectively, of a covariance matrix. Based on statistical mechanics, the covariance matrix for ΔX is given by

$$<\Delta X \cdot \Delta X^T > = \int \Delta X \cdot \Delta X^T p(\Delta X)d\Delta X=\frac{k_B T}{\gamma}\Gamma^{-1}$$

The last equality is obtained by inserting the above p(ΔX) and taking the (generalized Gaussian) integral. Since,

$$<\Delta X \cdot \Delta X^T > = <\Delta Y \cdot \Delta Y^T > = <\Delta Z \cdot \Delta Z^T > =\frac{1}{3} <\Delta R \cdot \Delta R^T >$$

<ΔR_{i}^{2}> and <ΔR_{i} · ΔR_{j}> follows

$$<\Delta R_i^2 > = \frac{3 k_B T}{\gamma}(\Gamma^{-1})_{ii}$$
$$<\Delta R_i \cdot \Delta R_j > = \frac{3 k_B T}{\gamma}(\Gamma^{-1})_{ij}$$

=== Mode decomposition ===
The GNM normal modes are found by diagonalization of the Kirchhoff matrix, Γ = UΛU^{T}. Here, U is a unitary matrix, U^{T} = U^{−1}, of the eigenvectors u_{i} of Γ and Λ is the diagonal matrix of eigenvalues λ_{i}. The frequency and shape of a mode is represented by its eigenvalue and eigenvector, respectively. Since the Kirchhoff matrix is positive semi-definite, the first eigenvalue, λ_{1}, is zero and the corresponding eigenvector have all its elements equal to 1/√N. This shows that the network model translationally invariant.

Cross-correlations between residue fluctuations can be written as a sum over the N-1 nonzero modes as

$$<\Delta R_i \cdot \Delta R_j> = \frac{3 k_B T}{\gamma}[U\Lambda^{-1}U^T]_{ij}=\frac{3 k_B T}{\gamma}\sum_{k=1}^{N-1}\lambda_k^{-1}  [u_k u_k^T]_{ij}$$

It follows that, [ΔR_{i} · ΔR_{j}], the contribution of an individual mode is expressed as

$$[\Delta R_i \cdot \Delta R_j]_k = \frac{3 k_B T}{\gamma}\lambda_k^{-1} [u_k]_i [u_k]_j$$

where [u_{k}]_{i} is the ith element of u_{k}.

=== Influence of local packing density ===
By definition, a diagonal element of the Kirchhoff matrix, Γ_{ii}, is equal to the degree of a node in GNM that represents the corresponding residue's coordination number. This number is a measure of the local packing density around a given residue. The influence of local packing density can be assessed by series expansion of Γ^{−1} matrix. Γ can be written as a sum of two matrices, Γ = D + O, containing diagonal elements and off-diagonal elements of Γ.

Γ^{−1} = (D + O)^{−1} = [ D (I + D^{−1}O) ]^{−1} = (I + D^{−1}O)^{−1}D^{−1} = (I - D^{−1}O + ...)D^{−1} = D^{−1} - D^{−1}O D^{−1} + ...

This expression shows that local packing density makes a significant contribution to expected fluctuations of residues. The terms that follow inverse of the diagonal matrix, are contributions of positional correlations to expected fluctuations.

== GNM applications ==
Figure 3: Example of theoretical prediction of expected residue fluctuations for the catalytic domain of the protein Cdc25B, a cell division cycle dual-specificity phosphatase. A. Comparison of β-factors from X-ray structure (yellow) and theoretical calculations (red). B. Structure of catalytic domain of Cdc25B colored according to theoretical motility of regions. Light blue regions, e.g. topmost alpha-helix next to the catalytic site of this protein, are expected to be more mobile than the rest of the domain. C. Cross-correlation map i.e. normalized <ΔR_{i}·ΔR_{j}> values. Red-colored regions correspond to collective residue motions and blue-colored regions correspond to uncorrelated motions. The results are retrieved iGNM server. PDB ID of Cdc25B is 1QB0.

=== Equilibrium fluctuations ===
Equilibrium fluctuations of biological molecules can be experimentally measured. In X-ray crystallography the B-factor (also called Debye-Waller or temperature factor) of each atom is a measure of its mean-square fluctuation near its equilibrium position in the native structure. In NMR experiments, this measure can be obtained by calculating root-mean-square differences between different models. In many applications and publications, including the original articles, it has been shown that expected residue fluctuations obtained by the GNM are in good agreement with the experimentally measured native state fluctuations. The relation between B-factors, for example, and expected residue fluctuations obtained from GNM is as follows

$$B_i = \frac{8\pi^2}{3}< \Delta R_{i} \cdot \Delta R_{i} > = \frac{8\pi^2 k_B T}{\gamma}(\Gamma^{-1})_{ii}$$

Figure 3 shows an example of GNM calculation for the catalytic domain of the protein Cdc25B, a cell division cycle dual-specificity phosphatase.

Figure 4: Slow modes obtained from GNM calculations are depicted on Cdc2B catalytic domain. A. Plot of the slowest mode. B. Mapping of the amplitude of motion in the slowest mode onto protein structure. The alpha-helix nearby the catalytic site of this domain is the most mobile region of the protein along the slowest mode. Expected values of fluctuations were also highest at this region, as shown in Figure 3. The results are retrieved iGNM server. PDB ID of Cdc25B is 1QB0.

=== Physical meanings of slow and fast modes ===
Diagonalization of the Kirchhoff matrix decomposes the conformational motions into a spectrum of collective modes. The expected values of fluctuations and cross-correlations are obtained from linear combinations of fluctuations along these normal modes. The contribution of each mode is scaled with the inverse of that modes frequency. Hence, slow (low frequency) modes contribute most to the expected fluctuations. Along the few slowest modes, motions are shown to be collective and global and potentially relevant to functionality of the biomolecules. Fast (high frequency) modes, on the other hand, describe uncorrelated motions not inducing notable changes in the structure. GNM-based methods do not provide real dynamics but only an approximation based on the combination and interpolation of normal modes. Their applicability strongly depends on how collective the motion is.

=== Other specific applications ===
There are several major areas in which the Gaussian network model and other elastic network models have proved to be useful. These include:

- Spring bead based network model: In spring-bead based network model, the springs and beads are used as components in the crosslinked network. Springs are cross-linked to represent mechanical behavior of the material and bridge molecular dynamics (MD) model and finite element (FE) model (see Figure. 5). The beads represent material mass of cluster bonds. Each spring is used to represent a cluster of polymer chains, instead of part of a single polymer chain. This simplification allows to bridge different models at multiple length scales and improves the simulation efficiency significantly. At each iteration step in the simulation, forces in the springs are applied to the nodes at the center of the beads, and the equilibrated nodal displacements throughout the system are calculated. Different from the traditional FE method for obtaining stress and strain, the spring–bead model provides the displacements of the nodes and forces in the springs. The equivalent strain and strain energy of spring–bead based network model can be defined and calculated using the displacements of nodes and the spring characteristics. Furthermore, the results from the network model can be scaled up to obtain the structural response at the macroscale using FE analysis.
- Decomposition of flexible/rigid regions and domains of proteins
- Characterization of functional motions and functionally important sites/residues of proteins, enzymes and large macromolecular assemblies
- Refinement and dynamics of low-resolution structural data, e.g. Cryo-electron microscopy
- Molecular replacement for solving X-ray structures, when a conformational change occurred, with respect to a known structure
- Integration with atomistic models and simulations
- Investigation of folding/unfolding pathways and kinetics.
- Annotation of functional implication in molecular evolution

== Web servers ==
In practice, two kinds of calculations can be performed. The first kind (the GNM per se) makes use of the Kirchhoff matrix. The second kind (more specifically called either the Elastic Network Model or the Anisotropic Network Model) makes use of the Hessian matrix associated to the corresponding set of harmonic springs. Both kinds of models can be used online, using the following servers.

=== GNM servers ===
- iGNM: A database of protein functional motions based on GNM http://ignm.ccbb.pitt.edu
- oGNM: Online calculation of structural dynamics using GNM https://web.archive.org/web/20070516042756/http://ignm.ccbb.pitt.edu/GNM_Online_Calculation.htm

=== ENM/ANM servers ===
- Anisotropic Network Model web server http://www.ccbb.pitt.edu/anm
- elNemo: Web-interface to The Elastic Network Model (all atom) http://www.elnemo.org
- AD-ENM: Analysis of Dynamics of an Elastic Network Model
- WEBnm@: Web-server for Normal Mode Analysis of proteins

=== Other relevant servers ===
- ProDy: An Application Programming Interface (API) in Python, that integrates GNM and ANM analyses and several molecular structure and sequence analyses and visualization tools: http://prody.csb.pitt.edu
- HingeProt: An algorithm for protein hinge prediction using elastic network models http://www.prc.boun.edu.tr/appserv/prc/hingeprot/, or http://bioinfo3d.cs.tau.ac.il/HingeProt/hingeprot.html
- DNABindProt: A Server for Determination of Potential DNA Binding Sites of Proteins http://www.prc.boun.edu.tr/appserv/prc/dnabindprot/
- MolMovDB: A database of macromolecular motions: http://www.molmovdb.org/

== See also ==
- Gaussian distribution
- Harmonic oscillator
- Hooke's law
- Molecular dynamics
- Normal mode
- Principal component analysis
- Protein dynamics
- Rubber elasticity
- Statistical mechanics
