= Temblor, Inc. =

- Website type: Technology, Insurance, Geophysics
- Available in: English
- Creators: Ross Stein, Volkan Sevilgen
- Website: temblor.net
- Launched: 2014

Temblor, Inc. is a tech company that provides information about earthquakes and enables users to both see what the seismic hazard is at their home, and learn about precautions to help lessen the risk. The company has released a web app and a mobile app for Android and iOS.

Temblor was founded in 2014 by Ross Stein and Volkan Sevilgen, both coming from the United States Geological Survey. Together they have published research on earthquakes that have struck in 30 countries. Upon release, Temblor has been mentioned in several news sources, including the New York Times, CBS News, SFGate, MSN, and the Los Angeles Times, in articles about earthquakes and earthquake preparedness.

== Features ==
Temblor displays a map is with earthquakes and faults. Liquefaction and landslide data is also shown in several locations. Users are able to plug in an address and get the seismic hazard rank for that location along with estimates for seismic shaking and home damage. They are also shown the extent to which these risks could be mitigated by buying earthquake insurance or retrofitting the house. These features are provided for free and without ads for the general public.
