= Blavatnik Awards for Young Scientists =

Scientific award

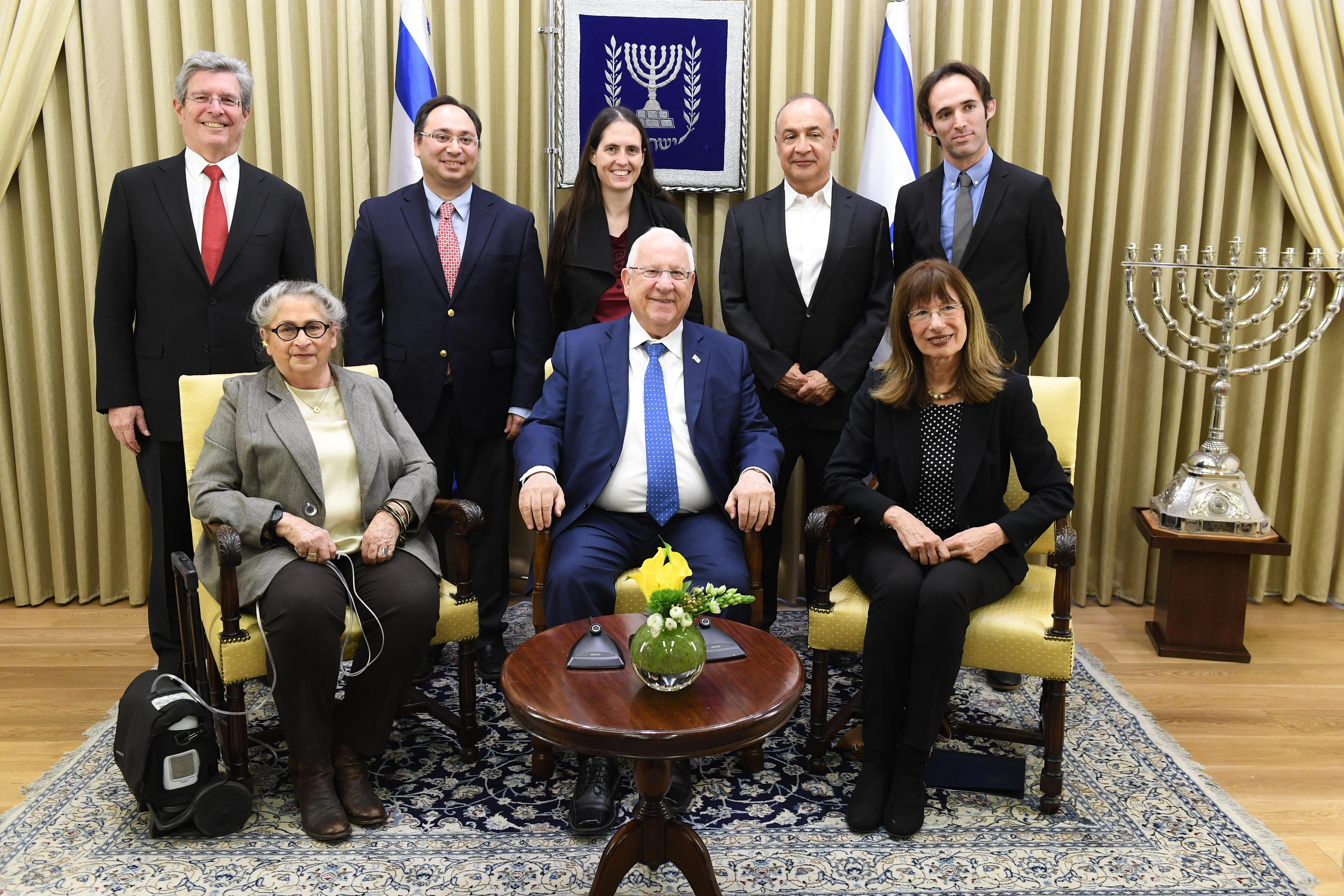
Blavatnik and Israeli President Reuven Rivlin with Israeli winners of the Blavatnik Awards for Young Scientists, February 2018

Blavatnik Awards for Young Scientists is an American science prize established in 2007 through a partnership between the Blavatnik Family Foundation, headed by the Soviet/Ukrainian Odessa-born businessman Len Blavatnik chairman of Access Industries, and the New York Academy of Sciences, headed by president Nicholas Dirks.

== History ==
The Blavatnik Award is a cash grant awarded annually to faculty and postdoctoral researchers in the life and physical sciences and engineers under the age of 42 who work at institutions in New York, New Jersey, and Connecticut. The first Blavatnik Awards were presented in New York City on Monday, November 12, 2007. On June 3, 2013, the Blavatnik Family Foundation and the New York Academy of Sciences announced the expansion of the faculty competition to include young scientists from institutions throughout the United States. In April 2017, the Blavatnik Awards program was expanded to the United Kingdom (UK) and Israel. By the end of 2022, the Blavatnik Awards for Young Scientists will have awarded prizes totaling US$13.6 million; Blavatnik Award recipients have hailed from 48 countries across six continents.

- Blavatnik National Awards are for faculty-rank scientists and engineers in Chemistry, Physical Sciences and Engineering, and Life Sciences.
- Blavatnik Regional Awards are for postdoctoral scientists working in the fields of Chemistry, Physical Sciences and Engineering, and Life Sciences in New York, New Jersey, and Connecticut.
- Blavatnik Awards for Young Scientists in the United Kingdom are for young, faculty-rank scientists and engineers from Scotland, Wales, Northern Ireland, and England.
- Blavatnik Awards for Young Scientists in Israel are for young faculty-rank scientists and engineers early in their independent research careers.

== U.S. Regional Postdoctoral Competition ==
The regional program recognizes postdoctoral researchers working at institutions in New York, New Jersey, and Connecticut. The regional program accepts nominations for scientists working in the life sciences, physical sciences, mathematics, and engineering. Nominations are accepted from institutions in New York, New Jersey, and Connecticut. Submissions for the regional program are reviewed by a Judging Panel of senior scientists, science editors, and past Blavatnik winners from the Mid-Atlantic area. As of 2013, winners of the postdoctoral competition receive US$30,000 and finalists receive US$10,000, each in unrestricted cash prizes.

=== Past U.S. Regional Winners and Finalists ===
Year	Winners	Finalists
2007	Leon Bottou, NEC Labs America, Computer Science George Malliaras, Cornell University, Nanotechnology Ruslan Medzhitov, Yale University, Immunology Milan Stojanovic, Columbia University, Biotechnology Leslie Vosshall, The Rockefeller University, Behavioral Science	Antje Baeumner, Cornell University, Environmental Engineering Christoph Bregler, New York University, Computer Science Geoffrey Coates, Cornell University, Organic Chemistry Antonio Giraldez, Yale University, Developmental Biology Tarun Kapoor, Rockefeller University, Cell Biology Scott N. Keeney, Memorial Sloan Kettering Cancer Center, Molecular Biology Philip Kim, Columbia University, Condensed Matter Physics Colin Nuckolls, Columbia University, Organic Chemistry Kathryn Uhrich, Rutgers University, Green Chemistry
2008	Andrey Pisarev, SUNY Downstate Medical Center, Molecular & Cellular Biology Steven Gubser, Princeton University, Nuclear & Particle Physics Andrew Houck, Princeton University, Electrical Engineering Laura Landweber, Princeton University, Evolutionary Biology Thomas Muir, The Rockefeller University, Biochemistry	Alexei Aravin, Cold Spring Harbor Laboratory, Developmental Biology Matthew Evans, Mount Sinai School of Medicine, Microbiology Valerie Horsley, Yale University, Developmental Biology Andreas Keller, The Rockefeller University, Neuroscience Shobha Vasudevan, Harvard University, Cell & Molecular Biology Daphne Bavelier, University of Rochester, Cognitive Neuroscience Geoffrey Coates, Cornell University, Organic Chemistry Christine Jacobs-Wagner, Yale University, Cell & Molecular Biology Eric Lai, Memorial Sloan-Kettering Cancer Center, Developmental Biology Ken Shepard, Columbia University, Electrical Engineering Saeed Tavazoie, Columbia University, Genetics & Genomics
2009	Sreekanth Chalasani, The Rockefeller University, Behavioral Science Paul Chirik, Cornell University, Chemical Biology Ofer Feinerman, Memorial Sloan-Kettering Cancer Center, Computational Biology Carmala Garzione, University of Rochester, Geology Rebecca Oppenheimer, American Museum of Natural History, Astrophysics Eva Pastalkova, Rutgers University, Neuroscience Alexander Pechen, Princeton University, Theoretical Physics Shai Shaham, The Rockefeller University, Developmental Biology	Tamas Horvath, Yale University, Molecular Neuroscience Lam Hui, Columbia University, Astrophysics Daniel Sigman, Princeton University, Geology Denis Zorin, New York University, Computer Science
2010	Zoltan Haiman, Columbia University, Astronomy Yaron Lipman, Princeton University, Computer Science Michal Lipson, Cornell University, Nanotechnology Haitao Liu, Columbia University, Nanotechnology Evgeny Nudler, New York University, Biochemistry Daniela Schiller, New York University, Behavioral Science Song-Hai Shi, Memorial Sloan-Kettering Cancer Center, Neuroscience	Nicolas Reyes, Institut Pasteur, Physiology & Biophysics Agnel Sfeir, New York University, Cell Biology Elza Erkip, Polytechnic University of NYU, Electrical Engineering David Evans, Yale University, Geology & Geophysics Neal Weiner, New York University, Particle Physics
2011	Johannes Gehrke, Cornell University, Computer Science Szabolcs Marka, Columbia University, Astrophysics Frank Oury, Columbia University, Physiology Valentino Tosatti, Columbia University, Mathematics	Roberto Bonasio, New York University, Biochemistry Mary Kay Lobo, University of Maryland, Cellular Neuroscience Shaun Olsen, Medical University of South Carolina, Structural Biology Ruth Van de Water, Brookhaven National Laboratory, Nuclear & Particle Physics Robert Anderson, City College CUNY, Ecology Charalampos Kalodimos, Rutgers University, Structural Biology Jun Korenaga, Yale University, Geology Olga Troyanskaya, Princeton University, Computational Biology Gerard Wysocki, Princeton University, Electrical Engineering
2012	B. Andrei Bernevig, Princeton University, Particle Physics Andrey Feklistov, The Rockefeller University, Structural Biology Jason Fridley, Syracuse University, Ecology Alison Galvani, Yale University, Epidemiology Michael Hahn, Columbia University, Astronomy Robert Johnston, New York University, Developmental Biology Assaf Naor, New York University, Computer Science Elisa Oricchio, Memorial Sloan-Kettering Cancer Center, Clinical Medicine Nicholas Stavropoulos, The Rockefeller University, Neuroscience	Michael Collins, Columbia University, Computer Science Wei Min, Columbia University, Physical Chemistry
2013	David Blei, Princeton University, Computer Science Jonathan Fisher, The Rockefeller University, Behavioral Science Kristjan Haule, Rutgers University, Condensed Matter Physics Patrick Holland, University of Rochester, Inorganic Chemistry Samie Jaffrey, Weill Cornell Medical College, Chemical Biology Frans Pretorius, Princeton University, Astrophysics Rachel Rosen, Columbia University, Astrophysics	Bi-Sen Ding, Weill Cornell Medicine, Physiology Emily Hodges, Cold Spring Harbor Laboratory, Genetics & Genomics Mariangela Lisanti, Princeton University, Nuclear & Particle Physics Jason MacGurn, Vanderbilt University, Cell Biology Xiankai Sun, Yale University, Electrical Engineering
2014	Clément Hongler, Columbia University, Applied Mathematics Jeremy Palmer, Princeton University, Chemical Engineering Panteleimon Rompolas, Yale University, Developmental Biology	Stephen Brohawn, The Rockefeller University, Biochemistry & Structural Biology Dilek Colak, Weill Cornell Medicind, Neuroscience Nathaniel Craig, Rutgers University, Theoretical Physics Knut Drescher, Princeton University, Immunology & Microbiology Xiaowei Hou, Memorial Sloan-Kettering Cancer Center, Biochemistry & Structural Biology Jérémie Palacci, New York University, Condensed Matter Physics
2015	Hani Goodarzi, The Rockefeller University, Genetics & Genomics Arash Nikoubashman, Princeton University, Chemical Engineering Nicolás Young, Columbia University, Geology & Geophysics	Allyson Friedman, Icahn School of Medicine at Mount Sinai, Neuroscience Ziv Shulman, Rockefeller University, Immunology & Microbiology Xiang Gao, Yale University, Biochemistry & Structural Biology Jinzhong Lin, Yale University, Biochemistry & Structural Biology Yang Liu, Princeton University, Electrical Engineering Dennis Perepelitsa, Brookhaven National Laboratory, Nuclear & Particle Physics
2016	William Anderegg, Princeton University, Ecology Tomoyasu Mani, Brookhaven National Laboratory, Physical Chemistry Jian Li, Princeton University, Condensed Matter Physics	Kate Meyer, Weill Cornell Medical College, Molecular & Cellular Biology Rachel Perry, Yale University, Biomedical Engineering & Biotechnology Matthieu Gagnon, Yale University, Biochemistry & Structural Biology Kuang Yu, Princeton University, Theoretical Chemistry Xi Chen, Columbia University, Materials Science & Nanotechnology Eli Visbal, Astrophysics & Cosmology
2017	Chao Lu, The Rockefeller University, Chromatin Biology and Epigenetics Andrew Ilott, New York University, Physical Chemistry June Huh, Institute for Advanced Study, Mathematics	Ataman Sendoel , The Rockefeller University, Molecular & Cellular Biology Eunyong Park, The Rockefeller University, Biophysics and Structural Biology Alan Healy, Yale University, Chemical Biology Wilhelm Palm, Memorial Sloane Kettering, Biochemistry & Structural Biology Douglas Stanford, Institute for Advanced Study, Theoretical Physics Chia Wei (Wade) Hsu, Yale University, Condensed Matter Physics
2018	Shruti Naik, PhD, nominated by The Rockefeller University (now at NYU School of Medicine) Lingyan Shi, PhD, nominated by Columbia University (now at the University of California, San Diego) Lu Wei, PhD, nominated by Columbia University (now at Caltech)	Samuel Bakhoum, MD, PhD, nominated by Weill Cornell Medicine (now at Memorial Sloan Kettering Cancer Center), Life Sciences Zhe Zhang, PhD, The Rockefeller University, Life Sciences Lucia Gualtieri, PhD, Princeton University, Physical Sciences & Engineering Peter Schauss, PhD, nominated by Princeton University (now at the University of Virginia), Physical Sciences & Engineering Niankai Fu, PhD, Cornell University, Chemistry Priyanka Sharma, PhD, Stony Brook University, Chemistry
2019	Laura Duvall, PhD, nominated by The Rockefeller University (now at Columbia University) Netta Engelhardt, PhD, nominated by Princeton University (now at Massachusetts Institute of Technology) Juntao Ye, PhD, nominated by Cornell University (now at Shanghai Jiao Tong University in China)	Carla Nasca, PhD, nominated by The Rockefeller University, Life Sciences Liling Wan, PhD, nominated by The Rockefeller University (now at the University of Pennsylvania), Life Sciences Derya Akkaynak, PhD, nominated by Princeton University, Physical Sciences & Engineering Matthew Yankowitz, PhD, nominated by Columbia University (now at the University of Washington), Physical Sciences & Engineering Yaping Zang, PhD, nominated by Columbia University, Chemistry Igor Dikiy, PhD, nominated by the Advanced Science Research Center at The Graduate Center, CUNY, Chemistry
2020	Antonio Fernández-Ruiz, PhD, nominated by New York University Adrian Price-Whelan, PhD, nominated by Flatiron Institute Ning Jia, PhD, nominated by Memorial Sloan Kettering Cancer Center	Amelia Escolano, PhD, nominated by The Rockefeller University, Life Sciences Marc Schneeberger Pané, PhD, nominated by The Rockefeller University, Life Sciences Zahra Abdollahnejad, PhD, nominated by University of Connecticut, Physical Sciences & Engineering Shruti Puri, PhD, nominated by Yale University, Physical Sciences & Engineering Xianwen Mao, PhD, nominated by Cornell University, Chemistry Yifei Zhang, PhD, nominated by Columbia University, Chemistry
2021	Direna Alonso Curbelo, PhD, nominated by Memorial Sloan Kettering Cancer Center, Life Sciences Chenhao Jin, PhD, nominated by Cornell University, Physical Sciences & Engineering Daniel Straus, PhD, nominated by Princeton University, Chemistry	Wenyan Jiang, PhD, nominated by Columbia University, Life Sciences Luka Mesin, PhD, nominated by The Rockefeller University, Life Sciences Irina Petrushina, PhD, nominated by Stony Brook University, Physical Sciences & Engineering Maxim Shcherbakov, PhD, nominated by Cornell University, Physical Sciences & Engineering Erik Henning Thiede, PhD, nominated by Flatiron Institute, Chemistry Xiaoming Zhao, PhD, nominated by Princeton University, Chemistry

== U.S. National Faculty Competition ==
Beginning with the 2014 awards cycle, the national faculty competition accepts nominations for scientists working in three disciplinary categories: Life Sciences, Physical Sciences & Engineering, and Chemistry. Nominations are accepted from institutions throughout the United States. Members of the Awards’ Scientific Advisory Council may also submit nominations. Submissions are reviewed by a Judging Panel of senior scientists and past Blavatnik Awards winners. The awards are conferred annually with one winner (“Laureate”) from each disciplinary category selected each year (for a total of three Laureates per year). Each Laureate will receive a US$250,000 unrestricted cash prize and is honored at a ceremony in New York City every fall.

=== Past U.S. National Laureates and Finalists ===
Year	Laureates	Finalists
2021	Kay M. Tye, Professor, Systems Neuroscience Laboratory Wylie Vale Chair, Salk Institute for Biological Studies Mircea Dincă, W. M. Keck Professor of Energy, Massachusetts Institute of Technology Andrea Alù, Einstein Professor of Physics, Founding Director of the Photonics Initiative at the Advanced Science Research Center, The Graduate Center, the City University of New York	Viviana Gradinaru, California Institute of Technology, Life Sciences; Sun Hur, Boston Children's Hospital, Life Sciences; Stanley Qi, Stanford University, Life Sciences; Peter James Turnbaugh, University of California, San Francisco, Life Sciences; Mikhail G. Shapiro, California Institute of Technology, Life Sciences; Michael Fischbach, Stanford University, Life Sciences; Kay M. Tye, Salk Institute for Biological Studies, Life Sciences; Kaiyu Guan, University of Illinois at Urbana-Champaign, Life Sciences; Houra Merrikh, Vanderbilt University, Life Sciences; Ahmet Yildiz, University of California, Berkeley, Life Sciences; Brandi Cossairt, University of Washington, Chemistry; Danna Freedman, Northwestern University, Chemistry; Hosea Nelson, University of California, Los Angeles, Chemistry; Mircea Dincă, Massachusetts Institute of Technology, Chemistry; Paul Dauenhauer, University of Minnesota, Chemistry; Prashant K. Jain, University of Illinois at Urbana-Champaign, Chemistry; Rebekka Klausen, Johns Hopkins University, Chemistry; Sara Skrabalak, Indiana University, Chemistry; Shannon Boettcher, University of Oregon, Chemistry; Wei Min, Columbia University, Chemistry; Wenjun Zhang, University of California, Berkeley, Chemistry; Aditya Akella, University of Wisconsin-Madison, Physical Sciences & Engineering; Andrea Alù, The Graduate Center, The City University of New York, Physical Sciences & Engineering; Andrea Young, University of California, Santa Barbara, Physical Sciences & Engineering; Asegun Henry, Massachusetts Institute of Technology, Physical Sciences & Engineering; Graham Neubig, Carnegie Mellon University, Physical Sciences & Engineering; Guihua Yu, The University of Texas at Austin, Physical Sciences & Engineering; Kilian Weinberger, Cornell University, Physical Sciences & Engineering; Kristen Grauman, The University of Texas at Austin, Physical Sciences & Engineering; Liangbing Hu, University of Maryland, College Park, Physical Sciences & Engineering; Noah Planavsky, Yale University, Physical Sciences & Engineering
2020	Clifford Brangwynne, Professor of Chemical and Biological Engineering, Princeton University William Dichtel, Professor of Chemistry, Northwestern University Brian Metzger, Professor of Physics, Columbia University	Polina Anikeeva, Massachusetts Institute of Technology, Life Sciences Clifford Brangwynne, Princeton University, Life Sciences Elena Gracheva, Yale University, Life Sciences Viviana Gradinaru, California Institute of Technology, Life Sciences Sun Hur, Boston Children's Hospital, Life Sciences Cigall Kadoch, Dana-Farber Cancer Institute, Life Sciences Julius Lucks, Northwestern University, Life Sciences Houra Merrikh, Vanderbilt University, Life Sciences Seth Murray, Texas A & M University, Life Sciences Nieng Yan, Princeton University, Life Sciences Aditya Akella, University of Wisconsin-Madison, Physical Sciences & Engineering Andrea Alù, Advanced Sciences Research Center, The Graduate Center, CUNY, Physical Sciences & Engineering Cory Dean, Columbia University, Physical Sciences & Engineering Kristen Grauman, The University of Texas at Austin, Physical Sciences & Engineering Mohammad Hafezi, University of Maryland, College Park, Physical Sciences & Engineering Mohammad Hajiaghayi, University of Maryland, College Park, Physical Sciences & Engineering Liangbing Hu, University of Maryland, College Park, Physical Sciences & Engineering Subhash Khot, New York University, Physical Sciences & Engineering Maureen Long, Yale University, Physical Sciences & Engineering Brian Metzger, Columbia University, Physical Sciences & Engineering Aydogan Ozcan, University of California, Los Angeles, Physical Sciences & Engineering Luis Campos, Columbia University, Chemistry William Dichtel, Northwestern University, Chemistry Guangbin Dong, University of Chicago, Chemistry Neil Garg, University of California, Los Angeles, Chemistry Prashant Jain, University of Illinois at Urbana-Champaign, Chemistry Wei Min, Columbia University, Chemistry Gary Patti, Washington University in St. Louis, Chemistry Ryan Shenvi, Scripps Research, Chemistry Emily Weiss, Northwestern University, Chemistry
2019	Heather J. Lynch, Associate Professor with a joint appointment in Ecology and Evolution and the Institute for Advanced Computational Science, Stony Brook University Ana Maria Rey, JILA Fellow & Professor of Physics, University of Colorado Boulder Emily Balskus, Professor of Chemistry and Chemical Biology, Harvard University	Emily Balskus, Harvard University, Chemistry William Dichtel, Northwestern University, Chemistry Christy Haynes, University of Minnesota, Twin Cities, Chemistry Ive Hermans, University of Wisconsin-Madison, Chemistry Jeremiah Johnson, Massachusetts Institute of Technology, Chemistry Wei Min, Columbia University, Chemistry David Nicewicz, University of North Carolina at Chapel Hill, Chemistry Mohammad R. Seyedsayamdost, Princeton University, Chemistry Joseph Subotnik, University of Pennsylvania, Chemistry Emily Weiss, Northwestern University, Chemistry Andrea Alù, Advanced Science Research Center, City University of New York, Physical Sciences & Engineering Chiara Daraio, California Institute of Technology, Physical Sciences & Engineering Xiangfeng Duan, University of California, Los Angeles, Physical Sciences & Engineering Mohammad Hafezi, University of Maryland, College Park, Physical Sciences & Engineering Liangbing Hu, University of Maryland, College Park, Physical Sciences & Engineering Subhash Khot, New York University, Physical Sciences & Engineering Jure Leskovec, Stanford University, Physical Sciences & Engineering Ying Shirley Meng, University of California, San Diego, Physical Sciences & Engineering Brian Metzger, Columbia University, Physical Sciences & Engineering Ana Maria Rey, University of Colorado Boulder, Physical Sciences & Engineering Clifford Brangwynne, Princeton University, Life Sciences Viviana Gradinaru, California Institute of Technology, Life Sciences Michael Jewett, Northwestern University, Life Sciences Heather Lynch, Stony Brook University, Life Sciences Joseph Mougous, University of Washington, Life Sciences Seth Murray, Texas A&M University, Life Sciences Nicholas Navin, MD Anderson Cancer Center, Life Sciences Benjamin tenOever, Icahn School of Medicine at Mount Sinai, Life Sciences Benjamin Tu, UT Southwestern Medical Center, Life Sciences Nieng Yan, Princeton University, Life Sciences Gene Yeo, University of California San Diego, Life Sciences
2018	Janelle Ayres, an associate professor in the Nomis Center for Immunobiology & Microbial Pathogenesis and Helen McLoraine Developmental Chair at the Salk Institute for Biological Studies Neal K. Devaraj, associate professor of chemistry and biochemistry and bioengineering at the University of California, San Diego Sergei V. Kalinin, director of the Institute for Functional Imaging of Materials at Oak Ridge National Laboratory	Janelle Ayres, Salk Institute for Biological Studies, Life Sciences Edward Boyden, Massachusetts Institute of Technology, Life Sciences Clifford Brangwynne, Princeton University, Life Sciences Zachary Lippman, Cold Spring Harbor Laboratory, Life Sciences Franziska Michor, Dana-Farber Cancer Institute, Life Sciences Joseph Mougous, University of Washington, Life Sciences Celeste Nelson, Princeton University, Life Sciences Bradley Pentelute, Massachusetts Institute of Technology, Life Sciences Benjamin Tu, UT Southwestern Medical Center, Life Sciences Gene Yeo, University of California, San Diego, Life Sciences Emily Balskus, Harvard University, Chemistry Luis Campos, Columbia University, Chemistry Bianxiao Cui, Stanford University, Chemistry Mircea Dincă, Massachusetts Institute of Technology, Chemistry Neal Devaraj, University of California, San Diego, Chemistry Neil Garg, University of California, Los Angeles, Chemistry Christy Haynes, University of Minnesota, Chemistry Bo Huang, University of California, San Francisco, Chemistry Joseph Subotnik, University of Pennsylvania, Chemistry Emily Weiss, Northwestern University, Chemistry Andrea Alù, The Advanced Science Research Center at The Graduate Center of the City University of New York. Alexandra Boltasseva, Purdue University, Physical Sciences & Engineering Xiangfeng Duan, University of California, Los Angeles, Physical Sciences & Engineering Jonathan Fortney, University of California, Santa Cruz, Physical Sciences & Engineering Ryan Hayward, University of Massachusetts Amherst, Physical Sciences & Engineering Sergei V. Kalinin, Oak Ridge National Laboratory, Physical Sciences & Engineering Jure Leskovec, Stanford University, Physical Sciences & Engineering Ying Shirley Meng, University of California, San Diego, Physical Sciences & Engineering Brian Metzger, Columbia University, Physical Sciences & Engineering Anastasia Volovich, Brown University, Physical Sciences & Engineering Gleb Yushin, Georgia Institute of Technology, Physical Sciences & Engineering
2017	Yi Cui, Professor of Materials Science and Engineering, Photon Science and Chemistry, Stanford University and SLAC National Accelerator Laboratory Melanie Sanford, Moses Gomberg Distinguished University Professor and Professor of Chemistry, University of Michigan Feng Zhang, Core Member, Broad Institute of MIT and Harvard	Mohamed El-Naggar, University of Southern California, Life Sciences Antonio Giraldez, Yale University, Life Sciences Stavros Lomvardas, University of California, San Francisco, Life Sciences Franziska Michor, Dana-Farber Cancer Institute, Life Sciences Celeste Nelson, Princeton University, Life Sciences Bradley Pentelute, Massachusetts Institute of Technology, Life Sciences Antonis Rokas, Vanderbilt University, Life Sciences Pardis Sabeti, Harvard University, Life Sciences Benjamin Tu, UT Southwestern Medical Center, Life Sciences Andrea Alù, The University of Texas at Austin, Physical Sciences & Engineering Nicolas Dauphas, The University of Chicago, Physical Sciences & Engineering Julia Greer, California Institute of Technology, Physical Sciences & Engineering Mark Hersam, Northwestern University, Physical Sciences & Engineering Sergei V. Kalinin, Oak Ridge National Laboratory, Physical Sciences & Engineering Jure Leskovec, Stanford University, Physical Sciences & Engineering Tommaso Treu, University of California, Los Angeles, Physical Sciences & Engineering Anastasia Volovich, Brown University, Physical Sciences & Engineering Gleb Yushin, Georgia Institute of Technology, Physical Sciences & Engineering Matthew Becker, University of Akron, Chemistry William Dichtel, Northwestern University, Chemistry Matthew Disney, Scripps, Chemistry Michael Fischbach, University of California, San Francisco, Chemistry Nathan Gianneschi, University of California, San Diego, Chemistry Christy Haynes, University of Minnesota, Twin Cities, Chemistry Bo Huang, University of California, San Francisco, Chemistry Michael Strano, Massachusetts Institute of Technology, Chemistry Dmitri Talapin, University of Chicago, Chemistry
2016	David Charbonneau, Professor of Astronomy, Harvard University Phil Baran, Professor of Chemistry, The Scripps Research Institute Michael Rape, Professor of Cell and Developmental Biology, University of California, Berkeley	Xi Chen, Johns Hopkins University, Life Sciences Casey Dunn, Brown University, Life Sciences Antonio Giraldez, Yale University, Life Sciences Rob Knight, University of California, San Diego, Life Sciences Oliver Rando, University of California, Berkeley, Life Sciences Antonina Roll-Mecak, National Institutes of Health, Life Sciences Pardis Sabeti, Harvard University, Life Sciences Beth Shapiro, University of California, Santa Cruz, Life Sciences Leor Weinberger, Gladstone Institutes, Life Sciences Feng Zhang, Massachusetts Institute of Technology, Life Sciences Andrea Alù, The University of Texas at Austin, Physical Sciences & Engineering Alexei Borodin, Massachusetts Institute of Technology, Physical Sciences & Engineering Yi Cui, Stanford University, Physical Sciences & Engineering Jenny Greene, Princeton University, Physical Sciences & Engineering Julia Greer, California Institute of Technology, Physical Sciences & Engineering Sergei Kalinin, Oak Ridge National Laboratory, Physical Sciences & Engineering Aydogan Ozcan, University of California, Los Angeles, Physical Sciences & Engineering Amit Singer, Princeton University, Physical Sciences & Engineering Anastasia Volovich, Brown University, Physical Sciences & Engineering Garnet K.-L. Chan, Princeton University, Chemistry Matthew Disney, Scripps Florida, Chemistry Pieter Dorrestein, University of California, San Diego, Chemistry Michael Fischbach, University of California, San Francisco, Chemistry David Ginger, University of Washington, Chemistry Bo Huang, University of California, San Francisco, Chemistry Nevan Krogan, Gladstone Institutes, Chemistry Teri Odom, Northwestern University, Chemistry Edward Valeev, Virginia Polytechnic Institute and State University, Chemistry
2015	Christopher Chang, Professor of Chemistry and Molecular and Cellular Biology, University of California, Berkeley and Howard Hughes Medical Institute Edward F. Chang, Associate Professor in Residence of Neurological Surgery and Physiology, University of California, San Francisco (UCSF) and Co-Director of the Center for Neural Engineering and Prosthetics, UC Berkeley and UCSF Syed Jafar, Professor of Electrical Engineering and Computer Science, University of California, Irvine	Jonathan Kagan, Boston Children's Hospital, Life Sciences Rob Knight, University of California, San Diego, Life Sciences Harmit Malik, Fred Hutchinson Cancer Research Center, Life Sciences Luciano Marraffini, The Rockefeller University, Life Sciences Michael Rape, University of California, Berkeley, Life Sciences Jared Rutter, University of Utah, Life Sciences Alice Ting, Massachusetts Institute of Technology, Life Sciences Feng Zhang, Massachusetts Institute of Technology, Life Sciences Yi Zuo, University of California, Santa Cruz, Life Sciences Yi Cui, Stanford University & SLAC, Physical Sciences & Engineering Xiangfeng Duan, University of California, Los Angeles, Physical Sciences & Engineering Eric Ford, Pennsylvania State University, Physical Sciences & Engineering Markus Greiner, Harvard University, Physical Sciences & Engineering Ali Khademhosseini, Brigham and Women’s Hospital, Physical Sciences & Engineering Hakho Lee, Massachusetts General Hospital, Physical Sciences & Engineering Yueh-Lin Loo, Princeton University, Physical Sciences & Engineering Aydogan Ozcan, University of California, Los Angeles, Physical Sciences & Engineering Abhay Pasupathy, Columbia University, Physical Sciences & Engineering Ashvin Vishwanath, University of California, Berkeley, Physical Sciences & Engineering Phil Baran, Scripps Research Institute, Chemistry Bianxiao Cui, Stanford University, Chemistry Matthew Disney, Scripps, Chemistry Michael Fischbach, University of California, San Francisco, Chemistry Rustem Ismagilov, California Institute of Technology, Chemistry Nevan Krogan, Gladstone Institutes, Chemistry Hening Lin, Cornell University, Chemistry Melanie Sanford, University of Michigan, Chemistry Michael Strano, Massachusetts Institute of Technology, Chemistry Peng Yin, Harvard University, Chemistry
2014	Rachel Wilson, Harvard University, Life Sciences Marin Soljačić, Massachusetts Institute of Technology, Physical Sciences & Engineering Adam Cohen, Harvard University, Chemistry	Helen Blackwell, University of Wisconsin-Madison, Life Sciences Howard Chang, Stanford University, Life Sciences Jonathan Kagan, Boston Children’s Hospital, Life Sciences Rob Knight, University of Colorado, Boulder, Life Sciences Harmit Malik, Fred Hutchinson Cancer Research Center, Life Sciences Sarkis Mazmanian, California Institute of Technology, Life Sciences Michael Rape, University of California, Berkeley, Life Sciences Alice Ting, Massachusetts Institute of Technology, Life Sciences Sinisa Urban, Johns Hopkins University, Life Sciences Yi Cui, SLAC National Laboratory and Stanford University, Physical Sciences & Engineering Ali Hajimiri, California Institute of Technology, Physical Sciences & Engineering Patrick Hopkins, University of Virginia, Physical Sciences & Engineering Ali Javey, University of California, Berkeley, Physical Sciences & Engineering Ali Khademhosseini, Harvard University, Physical Sciences & Engineering Teri Odom, Northwestern University, Physical Sciences & Engineering Aydogan Ozcan, University of California, Los Angeles, Physical Sciences & Engineering Leonardo Rastelli, Stony Brook University, Physical Sciences & Engineering William Shih, Dana-Farber Cancer Institute, Physical Sciences & Engineering Phil Baran, The Scripps Research Institute, Chemistry Garnet Chan, Princeton University, Chemistry Christopher Chang, University of California, Berkeley, Chemistry Peng Chen, Cornell University, Chemistry Ruben Gonzalez, Columbia University, Chemistry Melanie Sanford, University of Michigan, Chemistry Michael Strano, Massachusetts Institute of Technology, Chemistry Peng Yin, Harvard University, Chemistry Martin Zanni, University of Wisconsin-Madison, Chemistry

== Israel Faculty Competition ==
In 2017 the Blavatnik Awards launched a national competition in Israel modeled on the U.S. Faculty awards. The Blavatnik Awards in Israel are administered by The New York Academy of Sciences in collaboration with the Israel Academy of Sciences and Humanities. Three Laureates from Israel are chosen each awards cycle and receive US$100,000 in unrestricted funds. The first awards were granted during a ceremony held at the Israel Museum in Jerusalem on February 4, 2018.

=== Past Israel Laureates ===
Year	Laureates
2018	Anat Levin, Associate Professor, The Andrew & Erna Viterbi Faculty of Electrical Engineering, Technion, Israel Institute of Technology Charles Diesendruck, Assistant Professor of Chemistry, Technion, Israel Institute of Technology Oded Rechavi, Senior Lecturer, Department of Neurobiology, Tel Aviv University
2019	Michal Rivlin, Senior Scientist and Sara Lee Schupf Family Chair, Weizmann Institute of Science Erez Berg, Associate Professor, Department of Condensed Matter Physics, Weizmann Institute of Science Moran Bercovici, Associate Professor of Mechanical Engineering, Technion – Israel Institute of Technology
2020	Igor Ulitsky, Senior Scientist, Department of Biological Regulation, Weizmann Institute of Science Emmanuel Levy, Senior Scientist, Department of Structural Biology, Weizmann Institute of Science Guy Rothblum, Associate Professor, Department of Computer Science and Applied Mathematics, Weizmann Institute of Science
2021	Yossi Yovel, Associate Professor of Zoology, Tel Aviv University, Israel Young Academy Member Rafal Klajn, Associate Professor and Head of the Helen and Martin Kimmel Center for Molecular Design, Weizmann Institute of Science Ido Kaminer, Assistant Professor, Department of Electrical Engineering, Technion – Israel Institute of Technology
2022	Noam Stern-Ginossar, Associate Professor, Microbiology, Weizmann Institute of Science Menny Shalom, Professor of Inorganic & Solid-State Chemistry, Ben-Gurion University of the Negev Ronen Eldan, Associate Professor, Department of Mathematics, Weizmann Institute of Science

== United Kingdom (UK) Faculty Competition ==
In 2017 the Blavatnik Awards launched a national competition across the United Kingdom modeled after the U.S. Faculty awards. A laureate and two finalists in each of three categories (Chemistry, Life Sciences, and Physical Sciences and Engineering) are chosen in the UK every awards cycle. In 2022, prize monies were increased for the UK competition and Laureates are awarded £100,000 and finalists receive £30,000. The first awards were granted during a ceremony held at the Victoria and Albert Museum in London on March 7, 2018.

=== Past United Kingdom (UK) Laureates and Finalists ===
Year	Field	Laureate	Finalists
2018	Chemistry	Andrew Goodwin, Professor of Materials Chemistry, University of Oxford	Robert Hilton, Durham University
2018	Chemistry	Andrew Goodwin, Professor of Materials Chemistry, University of Oxford	Philipp Kukura, University of Oxford
2018	Life Sciences	M. Madan Babu, Programme Leader, Medical Research Council (MRC) Laboratory of Molecular Biology	Timothy Behrens, University of Oxford; honorary Principal Investigator, University College London (UCL)
2018	Life Sciences	M. Madan Babu, Programme Leader, Medical Research Council (MRC) Laboratory of Molecular Biology	John Briggs, Medical Research Council (MRC) Laboratory of Molecular Biology
2018	Physical Sciences and Engineering	Henry Snaith, Professor of Physics, Group Leader Photovoltaics and Optoelectronics Device group, University of Oxford	Claudia de Rham, Imperial College London
2018	Physical Sciences and Engineering	Henry Snaith, Professor of Physics, Group Leader Photovoltaics and Optoelectronics Device group, University of Oxford	Andrew Levan, University of Warwick
2019	Chemistry	Philipp Kukura, University of Oxford	Igor Larrosa, University of Manchester
2019	Chemistry	Philipp Kukura, University of Oxford	Rachel O'Reilly, University of Birmingham
2019	Life Sciences	Ewa Paluch, University College London (UCL) & University of Cambridge	Timothy Behrens, University of Oxford & Honorary Principal Investigator, University College London (UCL)
2019	Life Sciences	Ewa Paluch, University College London (UCL) & University of Cambridge	Kathy Niakan, Francis Crick Institute
2019	Physical Sciences and Engineering	Konstantinos Nikolopoulos University of Birmingham	Gustav Holzegel, Imperial College, London
2019	Physical Sciences and Engineering	Konstantinos Nikolopoulos University of Birmingham	Máire O'Neill, Queen's University Belfast
2020	Chemistry	Kirsty Penkman, University of York	Matthew Fuchter, Imperial College London
2020	Chemistry	Kirsty Penkman, University of York	Stephen Goldup, University of Southampton
2020	Life Sciences	Timothy Behrens, University of Oxford and University College London (UCL)	Eleanor Stride, University of Oxford
2020	Life Sciences	Timothy Behrens, University of Oxford and University College London (UCL)	Edze Rients Westra, University of Exeter
2020	Physical Sciences and Engineering	Claudia de Rham, Imperial College London	Ian Chapman, UK Atomic Energy Authority and Culham Centre for Fusion Energy
2020	Physical Sciences and Engineering	Claudia de Rham, Imperial College London	Amaury Triaud, University of Birmingham
2021	Chemistry	Daniele Leonori, University of Manchester	David P. Mills, University of Manchester
2021	Chemistry	Daniele Leonori, University of Manchester	Matthew Powner, University College London
2021	Life Sciences	Stephen L. Brusatte, University of Edinburgh	John Marioni, European Bioinformatics Institute and University of Cambridge
2021	Life Sciences	Stephen L. Brusatte, University of Edinburgh	Edze Westra, University of Exeter
2021	Physical Sciences and Engineering	Sinead Farrington, University of Edinburgh	Artem Mishchenko, University of Manchester
2021	Physical Sciences and Engineering	Sinead Farrington, University of Edinburgh	Themis Prodromakis, University of Southampton
2022	Chemistry	Kim Jelfs, Imperial College London	Gonçalo Bernardes, University of Cambridge
2022	Chemistry	Kim Jelfs, Imperial College London	Stephen Thomas, University of Edinburgh
2022	Physical Sciences and Engineering	Matthew Brookes, University of Nottingham	Sarah Haigh, University of Manchester
2022	Physical Sciences and Engineering	Matthew Brookes, University of Nottingham	Anja Schmidt, University of Cambridge
2022	Life Sciences	Madeline Lancaster, MRC Laboratory of Molecular Biology	Erin Saupe, University of Oxford
2022	Life Sciences	Madeline Lancaster, MRC Laboratory of Molecular Biology	Sonja Vernes, University of St Andrews
2023	Chemistry	Susan Perkin, University of Oxford	Jesko Köhnke, University of Glasgow
2023	Chemistry	Susan Perkin, University of Oxford	Andrew L. Lawrence, University of Edinburgh
2023	Physical Sciences and Engineering	Clare Burrage, University of Nottingham	Jade Alglave, University College London (UCL) and ARM
2023	Physical Sciences and Engineering	Clare Burrage, University of Nottingham	James A. Screen, University of Exeter
2023	Life Sciences	Katie Doores, King’s College London	Andrew Saxe, University College London (UCL)
2023	Life Sciences	Katie Doores, King’s College London	Pontus Skoglund,Francis Crick Institute
2024	Chemistry	Anthony P. Green, The University of Manchester	Fernanda Duarte, University of Oxford
2024	Chemistry	Anthony P. Green, The University of Manchester	Samuel D. Stranks, University of Cambridge
2024	Physical Sciences and Engineering	Rahul R. Nair, The University of Manchester	Jayne Birkby, University of Oxford
2024	Physical Sciences and Engineering	Rahul R. Nair, The University of Manchester	Mehul Malik, Heriot-Watt University
2024	Life Sciences	Nicholas McGranahan, University College London	Tanmay Bharat, MRC Laboratory of Molecular Biology
2024	Life Sciences	Nicholas McGranahan, University College London	Yiliang Ding, John Innes Centre
2025	Chemistry	Liam Ball, University of Nottingham	Brianna R. Heazlewood, University of Liverpool
2025	Chemistry	Liam Ball, University of Nottingham	Chunxiao Song, University of Oxford
2025	Physical Sciences and Engineering	Benjamin J.W. Mills, University of Leeds	Hannah Price, University of Birmingham
2025	Physical Sciences and Engineering	Benjamin J.W. Mills, University of Leeds	Filip Rindler, University of Warwick
2025	Life Sciences	Christopher Stewart, Newcastle University	Andrew M. Saxe, University College London
2025	Life Sciences	Christopher Stewart, Newcastle University	Nicholas R. Casewell, Liverpool School of Tropical Medicine

== See also ==
- List of general science and technology awards
