= Erkip =

Erkip is a surname. Notable people with the surname include:

- Elza Erkip, Turkish-American computer engineer
- Hayrullah Erkip (born 2003), Turkish footballer
