= Anastasia Volovich =

Russian physicist

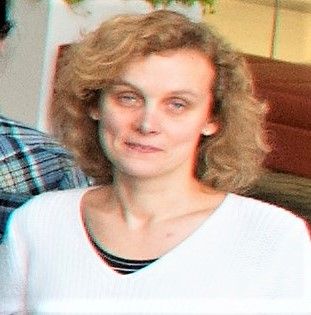
- Volovich in 2016
- Education: Moscow State University (BS, MS, 1999); Harvard University (PhD, 2002)
- Spouse: Marcus Spradlin
- Scientific career
- Workplaces: Kavli Institute for Theoretical Physics; Institute for Advanced Study; Brown University
- Thesis: Holography for Coset Spaces and Noncommutative Solitons (2002)
- Doctoral advisor: Andrew Strominger

Anastasia Volovich (born July 22, 1976) is a professor of physics at Brown University. She works on theoretical physics: quantum field theory, general relativity, string theory and related areas in mathematics.

== Early life and education ==
Volovich was born in Moscow. She attended the Moscow State University for her undergraduate studies where she completed her master's degree in 1999. Volovich moved to the United States for her graduate studies and completed her doctorate under the supervision of Andrew Strominger at Harvard University in 2002.

== Research and career ==
Volovich became Richard and Edna Salomon Assistant Professor at Brown University in 2006 after her post-doctoral research at the Kavli Institute for Theoretical Physics in Santa Barbara and William D. Loughlin Membership at the Institute for Advanced Study in Princeton. In 2011 she was promoted to an associate professor of physics with tenure, and in 2016 to Professor of Physics.

Volovich's research interests include scattering amplitudes in quantum field theory and gravity. The goal of this research program is to deepen our understanding of fundamental properties of gauge and gravity theories by discovering and exploring the hidden mathematical structures of scattering amplitudes and to use these novel structures as much as possible to aid practical calculations for experimentally relevant processes. Her work includes applying polylogarithms to scattering amplitudes in N = 4 supersymmetric Yang–Mills theory. Along with her colleagues Goncharov, Spradlin, and Vergu, she managed to significantly simplify the expression for 6-point two-loop maximally-helicity-violating (MHV) amplitudes.

== Awards and honours ==
- 2007 National Science Foundation CAREER Award
- 2008 Presidential Early Career Award for Scientists and Engineers
- 2011 Department of Energy Early Career Award
- 2011 Sloan Research Fellowship
- 2015 Simons Foundation Simons Investigator in Physics
- 2017 Institute for Advanced Study IBM Einstein Fellowship
- 2018 Blavatnik Awards for Young Scientists National Finalist
- 2019 Elected Fellow of the American Physical Society

== Selected publications ==
- (with M. Spradlin, A. Strominger) Les Houches lectures on de Sitter space, ArXiv
- (with R. Roiban, M. Spradlin) On the tree level S matrix of Yang-Mills theory, Phys. Rev. D70 (2004) 026009, ArXiv
- (with A. Goncharov, M. Spradlin, C. Vergu) Classical Polylogarithms for Amplitudes and Wilson Loops, Phys. Rev. Lett. 105 (2010) 151605, ArXiv
- (with J. Golden, A. Goncharov, M. Spradlin, C. Vergu) Motivic Amplitudes and Cluster Coordinates, JHEP 1401 (2014) 091, ArXiv
