= Aditya Akella =

Indian-American computer scientist

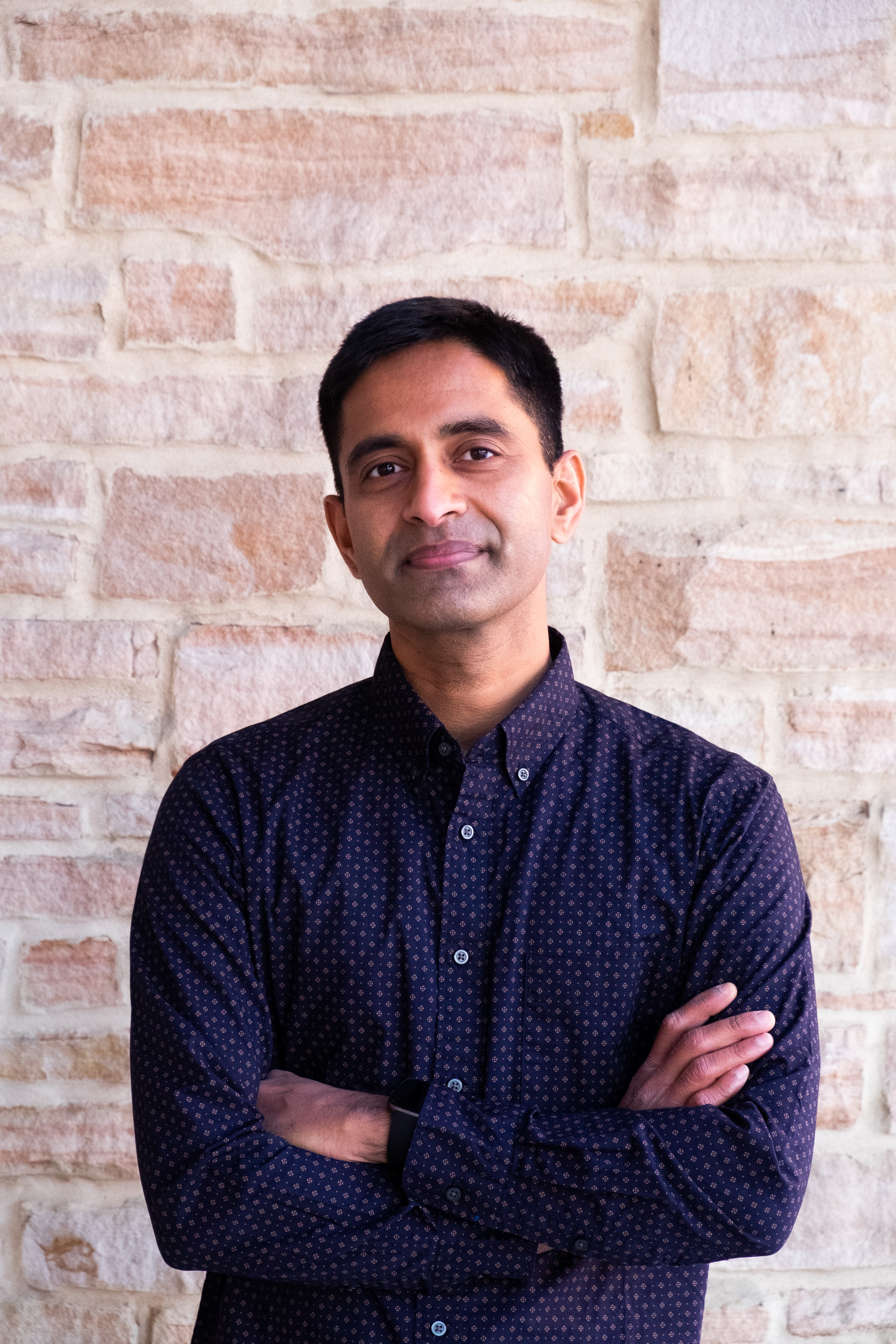
- Born: Hyderabad, India
- Education: Carnegie Mellon University (PhD 2005); IIT Madras (B.Tech 2000)
- Spouse: Shuchi Chawla
- Scientific career
- Fields: Computer Science, Computer Networking, Distributed Systems, Machine Learning
- Workplaces: University of Texas at Austin University of Wisconsin–Madison Stanford University
- Doctoral advisor: Srinivasan Seshan
- Website: www.cs.utexas.edu/~akella/

Srinivasa Aditya Akella is a computer scientist, professor and Regents Chair Professor at the University of Texas at Austin. He is notable for research in software-defined networking, big data systems, low latency networking, content distribution and network function virtualization.

== Career ==
Akella completed his undergraduate studies at the Indian Institute of Technology, Madras in 2000, then received his PhD in 2005 from Carnegie Mellon University with a thesis titled End Point-based Routing Strategies for Improving Internet Performance and Resilience. His doctoral advisor was Srinivasan Seshan. He completed a post-doc at Stanford University working with Nick McKeown where he worked on early efforts in SDN. In 2006 Akella joined the University of Wisconsin-Madison as an assistant professor, then later became an associate professor in 2012 and a full professor in 2017. In 2021, he joined the UT Austin Computer Science Department.

He leads the UT Networked Systems (UTNS) Research Group and is one of the Principal Investigators leading CloudLab. In 2014, SIGCOMM gave him their Rising Star Award for contributions to network management and content delivery. Akella holds over 15 patents related to computer networking and distributed systems. He has published 225 research papers in refereed international conferences and journals with his coworkers and his publications have been cited over 10,000 times (H-index=53).

Akella was chosen as a finalist in Physical Sciences and Engineering for both the 2021 and 2020 Blavatnik National Award for his contributions to improving the speed, efficiency and reliability of data center infrastructure. His ongoing research focuses on systems for machine learning, low latency networking, big data systems and intent-driven networking.

== Awards ==
- 2023: ACM Fellow
- 2021: Blavatnik Awards for Young Scientists, Finalist
- 2020: Blavatnik Awards for Young Scientists, Finalist
- 2018: H.I. Romnes Faculty Associate
- 2017: Vilas Associate
- 2015: Internet Research Task Force Applied Networking Research Prize
- 2014: SIGCOMM Rising Star Award

== Personal life ==
Akella is a native of Hyderabad, India, and currently resides in Austin, Texas. His wife Shuchi Chawla is also a computer science professor at the University of Texas-Austin.
