= Lingyan Shi =

- Citizenship: American
- Occupations: Biomedical engineer, academic, and author
- Title: Professor

Academic background
- Education: M.S., Biomedical Engineering; Ph.D., Biomedical Engineering
- Alma mater: New Jersey Institute of Technology; City College of New York

Academic work
- Institutions: University of California, San Diego (UC San Diego)
- Main interests: Developing super-resolution multiplex microscopy integrates, stimulated Raman scattering (SRS), multiphoton fluorescence (MPF), second harmonic generation (SHG) microscopy, fluorescence lifetime imaging (FLIM), dissecting metabolic changes in aging processes and disease development

Lingyan Shi is an associate professor in the Shu Chien-Gene Lay Department of Bioengineering in Jacobs School of Engineering, University of California, San Diego (UC San Diego).

Shi is most known for her work on optical techniques in neuroscience, aging, and cancer studies, including the discovery of the Golden Optical Window (wavelength range: 1550nm—1870nm) for deep brain imaging, development of A-POD & PRM enhanced multiplex DO-SRS imaging platforms for imaging metabolic activities in situ.

Shi is the recipient of the 2024 Davos Summit iCANX Young Scientist Award, 2024 BMES-CMBE Rising Star Young Faculty Award, 2023 Sloan Research Fellow Award by Alfred P. Sloan Foundation (in Chemistry), Scialog Fellow Award by CZI, the 2021 Rising Star Award from both Nature Light Science & Applications and Laser Focus World, and the 2018 Blavatnik Regional Awards for Young Scientists; she has also been featured in the 2025 Women in Optics notebook. In 2025, she was inducted to the National Academy of Inventors.

== Career ==
After earning her PhD in biomedical engineering, Shi worked as a postdoctoral researcher at the Institute for Ultrafast Spectroscopy and Lasers (IUSL, CCNY) from 2014 to 2016, and then transitioned to Columbia University Chemistry Department from 2016 to 2019. In 2019, she joined the Jacobs School of Engineering at UC San Diego as an Assistant Professor of Bioengineering, Her research lab focuses on the innovation and application of laser scanning multimodal microscopy and spectroscopy technologies.

Shi holds patents for inventions, including a compact optical analyzer that detects viruses and bacteria using advanced lasers and LEDs. She developed a method for deuterium incorporation via heavy water to measure biomolecular levels with Raman spectroscopy, aiding drug efficacy evaluation. Additionally, she created a nonlinear optical process to enhance signals in SRS microscopy through Resonant Stimulated Raman Scattering, improving imaging of vibrational states in cancer tissues.

== Research ==
Shi's research is interdisciplinary on both technology development and biological questions. She has developed advanced high-resolution Optical spectrometer and imaging platforms that integrates SRS, MPF, SHG, and FLIM, and studied metabolic changes in live cells and its organelles such as mitochondria, lysosomes, lipid droplets at subcellular resolution. Her 2016 study made the discovery of the "Golden Optical Window"—a band of infrared wavelengths that penetrates biological tissues more deeply than other wavelengths, increasing imaging depth in brain tissue by up to 50%. This work received media coverage and was featured in Phys.org and the Novus Light. In 2017, she investigated label-free fluorescence spectroscopy to detect early Alzheimer's disease by comparing the emission spectral profiles of tryptophan and NADH in mouse brain samples, which revealed significant differences between AD and normal tissues and was also highlighted in Laser Focus World magazine. In related research, she used a Stimulated Raman scattering (SRS) imaging platform from her lab to uncover altered lipid metabolism in Alzheimer's disease and identify a new strategy for targeting it with existing and novel drugs, a finding covered by SciTechDaily and Lab Manager Magazine.

Through her 2018 work, Shi developed the DO-SRS microscopy platform, offering a noninvasive approach to imaging metabolic dynamics in living animals. DO-SRS metabolic imaging has advanced the understanding of metabolic processes in living organisms, with the enzymatic incorporation of deuterium atoms into newly synthesized macromolecules to generate carbon-deuterium (C-D) bonds and has helped the visualization of C-D vibrational modes of newly synthesized molecules. She highlighted that the STRIDE microscopy technique effectively captured the spatial and temporal dynamics of glucose-derived macromolecules in various mouse tissues, contributing to the understanding of glucose metabolism and its anabolic utilization.

Shi's Lab research developed SRS microscopy into a super-resolution multiplex nanoscopy by developing the Adam optimization-based Pointillism Deconvolution (A-PoD) and penalized reference matching (PRM-SRS) algorithms, this expanded super resolution SRS into hyperspectral imaging of multi-molecular metabolic mapping, named, metabolic nanoscopy, which breaks the barrier in spatial resolution and also the limit in mapping diverse molecular species. Her group's research contributions include the development of A-PoD, a deconvolution algorithm that enhanced SRS imaging resolution, enabling the study of lipid droplets, metabolic dynamics, and differentiation of newly synthesized lipids in Drosophila brain samples across various diets.

Shi Lab research on DO‐SRS imaging of diet regulated metabolic activities in Drosophila during aging processes offers an approach to directly visualize spatiotemporal alterations of lipid turnover in situ at subcellular resolution, for studying the interconnections between lipid metabolic activities, diets, and aging processes.

== Works ==
Shi edited the book Deep Imaging in Tissue and Biomedical Materials: Using Linear and Nonlinear Optical Methods in 2017, which examined advanced optical imaging techniques with ultrafast lasers and nonlinear processes for safe, noninvasive deep tissue imaging in biomedical diagnostics. David L. Andrews, in his review of the book, remarked, "This impressive volume represents a landmark publication on the use of optical methods for deep biomedical imaging―a field that has been transformed by a variety of technical innovations in recent years". In 2018, she served as the editor of Neurophotonics and Biomedical Spectroscopy, which explored advanced optical techniques for non-invasive disease detection, focusing on tissue changes related to cancer and Alzheimer's while emphasizing neurophotonics in the study of nerve tissue and brain biochemistry.

== Awards and honors ==
- 2013 – Women's Leadership Summit, New York Times and Hunter College
- 2016 – Engineering Outreach Award, 21st Century Foundation
- 2016 – "Beacon" Honorees in "Researcher/Leadership", Photonics Spectra
- 2018 – Blavatnik Regional Award for Young Scientists, New York Academy of Sciences
- 2021 – Hellman Fellow, Society of Hellman Fellows
- 2021 – Rising Stars Awards, Laser Focus World
- 2023 – Advanced Imaging Scialog Fellow, RCSA and the Chan Zuckerberg Initiative
- 2023 – Sloan Research Fellow Award in Chemistry, Alfred P. Sloan Foundation
- 2023 – David L. Williams Lecture and Scholarship Award, Kern Lipid Conference
- 2024 – Davos Summit iCANX Young Scientist Award, Davos Summit
- 2024 – Speaker of China-America Frontiers of Engineering symposium at National Academy of Engineering
- 2024 – BMES-CMBE Rising Star Young Faculty Award, Cell and Molecular Bioeng Society
- 2024 – ICBME Rising Star
- 2024 – IUPS Faculty Award
- 2025 – Optics Notebook: Women in Optics, 20th-anniversary of SPIE notebook
- 2025 – National Academy of Inventors

== Bibliography ==
=== Books ===
- Deep Imaging in Tissue and Biomedical Materials (2017) ISBN 9781351797382
- Neurophotonics and Biomedical Spectroscopy (2018) ISBN 9780323480673

=== Selected articles ===
- Shi, L., Sordillo, L. A., Rodríguez‐Contreras, A., & Alfano, R. (2016). Transmission in near‐infrared optical windows for deep brain imaging. Journal of biophotonics, 9(1-2), 38-43.
- Shi, L., Zheng, C., Shen, Y., Chen, Z., Silveira, E. S., Zhang, L., ... & Min, W. (2018). Optical imaging of metabolic dynamics in animals. Nature communications, 9(1), 2995.
- Zhang, L., Shi, L., Shen, Y., Miao, Y., Wei, M., Qian, N., ... & Min, W. (2019). Spectral tracing of deuterium for imaging glucose metabolism. Nature Biomedical Engineering, 3(5), 402-413.
- Wei, M., Shi, L., Shen, Y., Zhao, Z., Guzman, A., Kaufman, L. J., ... & Min, W. (2019). Volumetric chemical imaging by clearing-enhanced stimulated Raman scattering microscopy. Proceedings of the National Academy of Sciences, 116(14), 6608-6617.
- Shi, L., Liu, X., Shi, L., Stinson, H. T., Rowlette, J., Kahl, L. J., ... & Min, W. (2020). Mid-infrared metabolic imaging with vibrational probes. Nature Methods, 17(8), 844-851.
- Jang, H., Li, Y., Fung, A. A., Bagheri, P., Hoang, K., Skowronska-Krawczyk, D., ... & Shi, L. (2023). Super-resolution SRS microscopy with A-PoD. Nature Methods, 20(3), 448-458.
- Li, Y., Zhang, W., Fung, A. A., & Shi, L. (2022). DO‐SRS imaging of diet-regulated metabolic activities in Drosophila during aging processes. Aging Cell, 21(4), e13586.
- Li, Y., Chang, P., Sankaran, S., Jang, H., Nie, Y., Zeng, A., ... & Shi, L. (2023). Bioorthogonal stimulated Raman scattering imaging uncovers lipid metabolic dynamics in Drosophila brain during aging. GEN biotechnology, 2(3), 247-261.
- Li, Y., Munoz-Mayorga, D., Nie, Y., Kang, N., Tao, Y., Lagerwall, J., ... & Chen, X. (2024). Microglial lipid droplet accumulation in tauopathy brain is regulated by neuronal AMPK. Cell Metabolism.
- Zhang, W., Li, Y., Fung, A. A., Li, Z., Jang, H., Zha, H., ... & Shi, L. (2024). Multi-molecular hyperspectral PRM-SRS microscopy. Nature Communications, 15(1), 1599.

=== Selected book chapters ===
- Villazon, J. I., & Shi, L. (2024). Advances in Biomedical Imaging Modalities for Cancer Research and Diagnostics.
- Wei, W., Wang, X., Li, Y., Cheng, Y., Fung, A. A., Yang, X., & Shi, L. (2021). Advances in optical imaging of drug delivery across the blood-brain barrier. In Progress in Optics (Vol. 66, pp. 171–253). Elsevier.
- Li, Y., & Shi, L. (2022). Isotope-probed SRS (ip-SRS) imaging of metabolic dynamics in living organisms. In Stimulated Raman Scattering Microscopy (pp. 421–443). Elsevier.
- Rodríguez-Contreras, A., Shi, L., & Alfano, R. R. (2022). Effects of tryptophan metabolism on the brain: From early development to Alzheimer's disease. In Biophotonics, Tryptophan and Disease (pp. 107–114). Academic Press.
