= Sun Hur =

South Korean-born scientist

- Born: Seoul, South Korea:
- Awards: Blavatnik Awards for Young Scientists (finalist)

Academic background
- Education: BSc, physics, 2001, Ewha Womans University; PhD, physical chemistry, 2003, University of California, Santa Barbara
- Thesis: Theoretical Studies of importance of near attack conformers (NACs) in enzymatic catalysis (2003)
- Doctoral advisor: Thomas Bruice

Academic work
- Institutions: Harvard Medical School; Boston Children's Hospital; Howard Hughes Medical Institute; University of California, San Francisco

Sun Hur is a South Korean-born scientist. She is an Oscar M. Schloss Professor at Harvard Medical School and Boston Children's Hospital and an investigator in the Howard Hughes Medical Institute.

== Early life and education ==
Hur was born and raised in Seoul, South Korea to an engineering father and chemist-trained mother. She was admitted to Seoul National University and Ewha Womans University at the same time, but chose Ewha Womans University due to the passionate recruitment offer. She completed her Bachelor of Science degree from Ewha Womans University before moving to the United States in 2000 to conduct research at the Woods Hole Oceanographic Institution and participate in an exchange program at the University of California, Santa Barbara. Hur completed her PhD in physical chemistry in 2003 under the guidance of Thomas Bruice and then obtained post-doctoral training in X-ray crystallography at the University of California, San Francisco with Robert M. Stroud. While conducting her post-doctoral fellowship in experimental enzymology, Hur contributed to research on the mechanism by which a protein-synthesizing enzyme catalyzes reactions.

== Career ==
Following her post-doctoral training, Hur joined the faculty at Harvard Medical School (HMS) in 2008 as an assistant professor and Boston Children's Hospital in 2010. As an assistant professor of biological chemistry and molecular pharmacology, Hur focused her research on how the immune system detects viruses, specifically RNAs. In her own laboratory, Hur's research on a family of viral RNA receptors led to the discovery of key mechanistic principles of foreign nucleic acid sensing. In 2010, she was one of three HMS professors named Pew Scholars in the biomedical sciences by the Pew Charitable Trusts. Using funds from the Pew Scholarship, Hur and a post-doctoral fellow showed that ubiquitin helps the protein RIG-I gather into stable rings. This provided a structural rationale for how ubiquitin is vital for RIG-I and how that might help keep the immune system stable.

In 2015, Hur received the Vilcek Prize for Creative Promise in Biomedical Science as a young foreign-born biomedical scientist who has demonstrated significant early achievement in basic, applied or translational biomedical science. She was specifically recognized for her research into the immune system, particularly "disease-causing viruses that generate a double-stranded RNA during replication." Hur stated that she planned on using the funding from the prize to "develop medicines to prevent miscommunication in the immune system as well as strategies to use the immune system to combat certain cancers." As a result of her biomedical research, Hur received one of the National Institutes of Health's 2019 Director's Pioneer Award. In the same year, she was also promoted to the rank of Full professor in Harvard's Department of Biological Chemistry and Molecular Pharmacology. The following year, Hur was named a 2020 Blavatnik Awards for Young Scientists in Life Sciences finalist. She was also appointed to sit on the scientific advisory board for Silicon Therapeutics.

Prior to the start of the 2021–22 academic year, Hur was one of four HMS faculty members appointed Howard Hughes Medical Institute Investigators. During the time in Howard Hughes Medical Institute, Sun Hur is seeking to reveal underlying principles of innate immunity that allow the body to detect and respond to invading pathogens. Specifically, Hur and her team are investigating how the vertebrate immune system discriminates between self and non-self on the basis of RNA structure and modifications. Using structural and biochemical approaches, the team focuses on immune receptors and modulators in antiviral innate immune response. In November 2021, Hur was one of the three inaugural winners of the Paul Marks Prize for Cancer Research as a scientist under the age of 50 who is "making significant contributions to the understanding of cancer or are improving the treatment of the disease through basic or clinical research." She was also the 2022 recipient of the Protein Society Dorothy Crowfoot Hodgkin Award, which recognizes scientists who were influential in expanding societies understanding of proteins.
