= Rebekka Klausen =

American chemist

Rebekka Sidsel Klausen
- Education: Harvard University; Boston College
- Scientific career
- Workplaces: Columbia University; Johns Hopkins University
- Thesis: Benzoic acid and thiourea co-catalysis (2010)
- Doctoral advisor: Eric Jacobsen
- Website: pages.jh.edu/chem/klausen/

Rebekka Klausen is an American chemist who is the Second Decade Society Associate Professor at Johns Hopkins University. Her research considers carbon and silicon-based nanomaterials for optoelectronic devices. She was a finalist for the 2021 Blavatnik Awards for Young Scientists.

== Early life and education ==
Klausen is from Brookline, Massachusetts. She was an undergraduate student in biochemistry at Boston College. She moved to Harvard University as a graduate student, where she worked under the supervision of Eric Jacobsen and studied asymmetric Pictet–Spengler reactions. She moved to New York for postdoctoral research, joining the lab of Colin Nuckolls at Columbia University. There, she studied the conductive properties of molecules containing a 1-D chain of silicon atoms, as well as other fluorene-derivatives that can act as molecular wires.

== Research and career ==
Klausen began her independent career at Johns Hopkins University in 2013. Her research group studies organosilicon compounds, including poly(cyclosilane)s. Klausen initially looked to create a bottom-up fabrication process for the realization of silicon-based materials, and to develop cyclo-silane building blocks for their polymerization. Borrowing from the principles of carbon-based synthesis, Klausen has achieved precise control of the structure of silicon-based polymers. She was named as the Second Decade Society Associate Professor in 2019. Klausen is part of the National Science Foundation Polymer Optimization Centre.

== Awards and honors ==
- 2015 United States Department of Energy Early Career Award
- 2017 Sloan Research Fellowship
- 2017 Marion Milligan Mason Award for Women in the Chemical Sciences
- 2017 Johns Hopkins University Catalyst Award
- 2018 National Science Foundation CAREER Award
- 2021 American Chemical Society Award in Pure Chemistry
- 2021 Blavatnik Award for Young Scientists
