= Brian D. Metzger =

American theoretical astrophysicist

- Born: Brian David Metzger; Burlington, Iowa, U.S.
- Citizenship: United States
- Education: University of Iowa (B.S.); University of California, Berkeley (Ph.D.)
- Known for: Kilonovae; electromagnetic counterparts of neutron-star mergers; gravitational-wave astrophysics; multi-messenger astronomy
- Awards: Alfred P. Sloan Research Fellowship (2014); New Horizons in Physics Prize (2019); Bruno Rossi Prize (2019, with Daniel Kasen); Blavatnik National Awards Laureate (2020); Legacy Fellow of the American Astronomical Society
- Scientific career
- Fields: Theoretical astrophysics
- Workplaces: Princeton University (NASA Einstein Fellow); Columbia University (2013–present)
- Thesis: Theoretical model of gamma ray burst central engines (2009)
- Doctoral advisor: Eliot Quataert
- Website: www.columbia.edu/~bdm2122/

Brian D. Metzger is an American theoretical astrophysicist and professor of physics at Columbia University. His research focuses on high-energy astrophysics, compact-object mergers, gravitational-wave sources, and electromagnetic transients. Metzger is known for theoretical work on kilonovae and electromagnetic counterparts of neutron-star mergers.

== Education and career ==
Metzger was born and raised in Burlington, Iowa. He graduated from Burlington Community High School in 1999. Metzger received a Bachelor of Science degree in Physics, Astronomy, and Mathematics from the University of Iowa. He completed his Ph.D. at the University of California, Berkeley in 2009, for which he received the Mary Elizabeth Uhl Prize for outstanding scholarly achievement in graduate studies. He was a NASA Einstein Fellow at Princeton University before joining the Columbia University Department of Physics in 2013. He is a professor in Columbia's Department of Physics and a member of the Theoretical High Energy Astrophysics group.

== Research ==
Metzger's research concerns theoretical astrophysics, gravitational-wave astrophysics, multi-messenger astronomy, fast radio bursts, novae, compact-object mergers, and related high-energy transients. His work has included theoretical predictions for electromagnetic counterparts of binary neutron-star mergers.

In 2010, Metzger and collaborators published a model for optical transients from compact-object mergers powered by radioactive decay of r-process nuclei, in which they introduced the term "kilonova". These models provided a basis for interpreting the electromagnetic counterpart seen following LIGO's first neutron-star merger, GW170817.

== Awards and honors ==
Metzger received a Sloan Research Fellowship in 2014. He was named to the inaugural class of Legacy Fellows of the American Astronomical Society.

In 2019, Metzger received the New Horizons in Physics Prize from the Breakthrough Prize Foundation for "pioneering predictions of the electromagnetic signal from a neutron star merger" and for leadership in multi-messenger astronomy. He shared the 2019 Bruno Rossi Prize of the High Energy Astrophysics Division of the American Astronomical Society with Daniel Kasen for their work on kilonovae. In 2020, Metzger was named a Blavatnik National Awards Laureate in Physical Sciences & Engineering.

== Selected publications ==
- Metzger, B. D.; Martínez-Pinedo, G.; Darbha, S.; Quataert, E.; Arcones, A.; Kasen, D.; Thomas, R.; Nugent, P.; Panov, I. V.; Zinner, N. T. (2010). "Electromagnetic counterparts of compact object mergers powered by the radioactive decay of r-process nuclei". Monthly Notices of the Royal Astronomical Society. 406 (4): 2650-2662. doi:10.1111/j.1365-2966.2010.16864.x.
- Metzger, B. D.; Berger, E. (2012). "What is the most promising electromagnetic counterpart of a neutron star binary merger?". The Astrophysical Journal. 746 (1): 48. doi:10.1088/0004-637X/746/1/48.
- Kasen, Daniel; Fernández, Rodrigo; Metzger, Brian D. (2015). "Kilonova light curves from the disc wind outflows of compact object mergers". Monthly Notices of the Royal Astronomical Society. 450 (2): 1777-1786. doi:10.1093/mnras/stv721.
- Fernández, Rodrigo; Metzger, Brian D. (2016). "Electromagnetic signatures of neutron star mergers in the advanced LIGO era". Annual Review of Nuclear and Particle Science. 66: 23-45. doi:10.1146/annurev-nucl-102115-044819.
- Metzger, Brian D. (2020). "Kilonovae". Living Reviews in Relativity. 23 (1): 1. doi:10.1007/s41114-019-0024-0.
