= Scott N. Keeney =

American molecular biologist

- Born: December 3, 1965 (age 60); Baltimore, Maryland, US

Academic background
- Education: BSc, 1987, Virginia Tech; PhD, Biochemistry, 1993, University of California, Berkeley

Academic work
- Institutions: Memorial Sloan Kettering Cancer Center

Scott Neal Keeney (December 3, 1965) is an American molecular biologist.

== Early life and education ==
Keeney was born on December 3, 1965, in Baltimore, Maryland. Growing up, he attended the Baltimore Polytechnic Institute and was allowed to use the laboratories at Johns Hopkins Bloomberg School of Public Health due to his mother's position as secretary in the Biochemistry Department. While attending Virginia Tech, Keeney came out as gay and enrolled at the University of California, Berkeley (UC Berkeley) for his PhD. After receiving his PhD from UC Berkeley in 1993, Keeney decided to switch fields and change his focus from mammalian cells to yeast. While attending a presentation on a paper written by Nancy Kleckner, he was inspired to apply for a post-doctoral position in her laboratory.

== Research background ==
Keeney completed his postdoctoral training at Harvard University before establishing the Laboratory of Meiotic Recombination at the Memorial Sloan Kettering Cancer Center in 1997. As a professor in their molecular biology program, Keeney's research focused on the mechanism and regulation of homologous recombination during meiosis. He discovered the function of a protein called SPO11, which creates the double-strand breaks in DNA that are essential for recombination. In 2001, he was treated for a germ cell tumor and began collaborating with George Bosl and Robert Motzer on germ cell tumor biology.

By 2017, Keeney began investigating how cells identify and fix these breaks through a process called homologous recombination. In 2021, he collaborated with Claeys Bouuaert to isolate the protein Spo11, and the proteins it interacts with, and co-published Structural and functional characterization of the Spo11 core complex.

== Awards and recognition ==
As a result of his research, Keeney was named a finalist for the 2007 Blavatnik Awards for Young Scientists. The following year, Keeney was selected as a Howard Hughes Medical Institute Investigator. He was subsequently elected a fellow of the American Academy of Arts and Sciences for his "major contributions to our current understanding of how genetic recombination takes place during meiosis." During the COVID-19 pandemic, Keeney was elected to the National Academy of Sciences "for his quest to understand the mechanism of meiotic recombination and to determine how this process is coordinated with other events of meiotic prophase."

== Personal life ==
Keeney came out as gay during his senior year at Virginia Tech, and is a strong proponent of visibility of LGBTQ+ researchers in STEM. He married his husband on a leap day.
