= Timothy Behrens (neuroscientist) =

British neuroscientist

Timothy E.J. Behrens FRS is a British neuroscientist. He is Deputy Director of the Wellcome Centre for Integrative Neuroscience Professor of Computational neuroscience at the University of Oxford, and Honorary Lecturer at, Wellcome Centre for Imaging Neuroscience, University College London.

He earned an MEng and a D.Phil. from the University of Oxford.

In 2020 he won the UK Life Sciences Blavatnik Award for Young Scientists, having been a finalist for this award in 2018 and 2019. He was elected a Fellow of the Royal Society in the same year.
