= Emily A. Weiss =

American scientist

- Education: Northwestern University (PhD); Princeton University (BSc)
- Scientific career
- Workplaces: Northwestern University
- Thesis: The influence of molecular structure and environment on the mechanism of photo-induced charge transfer in organic systems (2005)
- Doctoral advisor: Mark Ratner, Michael R. Wasielewski
- Website: Weiss lab

Emily A. Weiss is the Mark and Nancy Ratner Professor of Chemistry and director of the Photo-Sciences Research Center at Northwestern University. Her research considers the optical and electronic properties of nanostructures, including hybrid organic–inorganic quantum dots. She was a two-time finalist in the Blavatnik Awards for Young Scientists.

== Early life and education ==
Weiss earned her undergraduate degree at Princeton University and graduated in 2000. Whilst she initially majored in English, Weiss took courses in quantum mechanics, and became increasingly interested in chemistry. She moved to Northwestern University for her graduate studies, where she earned her doctoral degree under the supervision of Mark Ratner in 2005. Weiss joined Harvard University as a postdoctoral research fellow in 2005. She worked in the laboratory of George M. Whitesides, studying electron transport through organic Self-Assembled Monolayers (SAMs). Here she developed new protocols to fabricate nanostructures from metal-polymer hybrid materials.

== Research and career ==
Weiss was appointed as the Clare Boothe Luce Assistant Professor at Northwestern University in 2008. She was promoted to professor in 2015, the Dow Chemical Company Chair in 2015 and the Mark and Nancy Ratner Professor in 2018.

Her research considers the mechanisms of energy conversion in organic and hybrid materials. In particular, Weiss studies the optoelectronic and properties of functionalised colloidal semiconductor nanocrystals, known as quantum dots. She studies colloidal photocatalysis, and in particular, how nanoparticle catalysts can be used to access complicated bioactive compounds. These nanoparticles make use of light to activate surface molecules, which fuse together and form large molecules that can be useful in biology. They outperform the most commonly used complexes as sensitisers for carbon dioxide reduction.

She is part of the Argonne–Northwestern Solar Energy Research Center and Center for Bio-Inspired Energy Science. In this capacity Weiss looks to develop new molecular materials through the use of electron ratchets, which switch systems between two electronic states (one where electrons are evenly diffuse and one where they produce a net current). She has also developed new designs for photonic qubits and ultrafast tools for biological imaging.

=== Awards and honours ===
Her awards and honours include:

- 2010 Presidential Early Career Award for Scientists and Engineers
- 2013 Northwestern University Distinguished Teaching Award
- 2013 American Chemical Society Kavli Emerging Leader in Chemistry
- 2015 Kansas State University Phi Lambda Upsilon Distinguished Speaker
- 2015 American Chemical Society Harry Gray Award
- 2016 Stanford University Distinguished Women in Science Seminar Speaker
- 2018 American Chemical Society Early Career Award in Experimental Physical Chemistry
- 2018 Blavatnik Awards for Young Scientist Finalist
- 2019 Blavatnik Awards for Young Scientist Finalist

In 2019 she was included in the National Nanotechnology Initiative's top 30 women in nanotechnology.

=== Selected publications ===
Her publications include:

- Weiss, Emily A. (2004-05-05). "Making a Molecular Wire: Charge and Spin Transport through para-Phenylene Oligomers". Journal of the American Chemical Society. 126 (17): 5577–5584. Bibcode:2004JAChS.126.5577W. doi:10.1021/ja0398215. PMID 15113229.
- Weiss, Emily A. (2007-04-11). "Influence of Defects on the Electrical Characteristics of Mercury-Drop Junctions: Self-Assembled Monolayers of n-Alkanethiolates on Rough and Smooth Silver". Journal of the American Chemical Society. 129 (14): 4336–4349. Bibcode:2007JAChS.129.4336W. doi:10.1021/ja0677261. PMID 17358061.
- Weiss, Emily A. (2005-08-24). "Conformationally Gated Switching between Superexchange and Hopping within Oligo-p-phenylene-Based Molecular Wires". Journal of the American Chemical Society. 127 (33): 11842–11850. Bibcode:2005JAChS.12711842W. doi:10.1021/ja052901j. PMID 16104763.

She is deputy editor of The Journal of Chemical Physics and on the advisory board of Materials Horizons.
