= Houra Merrikh =

Iranian American microbiologist, biochemist, educator

Houra Merrikh is an Iranian-American microbiologist. She is a full professor at Vanderbilt University in the Department of Biochemistry. Her field of work is antibiotic resistance and bacterial evolvability. She also has 2 children Jasper and Jasmine Merrikh.

== Early life and education ==
Merrikh was born in Iran and fled the country during the Iran-Iraq War, she was raised in Turkey. At age 16, she was sent to Texas to continue her education. She naturalized as a citizen of the United States in 2003. After attending community college in Texas, she enrolled at the University of Houston and later Boston University.

She obtained a M.S. degree in 2006 and a Ph.D. in 2009 from Brandeis University, and worked with biologist Susan Lovett. She was a National Institutes of Health (NIH) postdoctoral fellow at the Massachusetts Institute of Technology (MIT) from 2009 until 2011.

== Career ==
In 2009, she was appointed Assistant Professor of Microbiology in the Department of Health and Sciences at the University of Washington. In 2015, she discovered a bacterial protein called Mutation Frequency Decline (Mfd) quickens the bacterial mutation process. In January 2019, she was appointed full Professor in the Department of Biochemistry at Vanderbilt University.

Her work researches ways to slow the rate of bacterial mutations and to block their evolution. In 2017, she led the research group to help bacteria survive hostile environments and resist antibiotics, done through disrupting DNA replication in order to boost the rate of gene mutations.

She has discovered the first compound (ARM-1, which stands for Anti-Resistance Molecule-1) that inhibits the evolution of antimicrobial resistance through transcription-coupled nucleotide excision repair across highly divergent bacterial pathogens. https://pubmed.ncbi.nlm.nih.gov/38911259/.

== Honors and awards ==
Merrikh is one of the recipients of the 2013 National Institutes of Health (NIH) Director’s New Innovator Awards, for investigating the impact of replication-transcription conflicts on bacterial evolution. She received the Vilcek Foundation, 2016 Vilcek Prize for Creative Promise in Biomedical Science, and the University of Washington Innovation Award in 2015 for her research on the impact of replication-transcription conflicts on antibiotic resistance development. In both 2020 and 2021, she was named as one of the top ten young scientists in the United States national competitions, in the category of life sciences, by the Blavatnik Foundation.

== Publications ==
Her most cited publications after the award of her doctorate are, according to Google Scholar:

- Merrikh, Houra; Machón, Cristina; Grainger, William H.; Grossman, Alan D.; Soultanas, Panos (February 2011). "Co-directional replication-transcription conflicts lead to replication restart". Nature. 470 (7335). Nature Publishing Group: 554–557. Bibcode:2011Natur.470..554M. doi:10.1038/nature09758. PMC 3059490. PMID 21350489. (Cited 132 times)
- Merrikh, Houra; Zhang, Yan; Grossman, Alan D.; Wang, Jue D. (2012). "Replication–transcription conflicts in bacteria". Nature Reviews Microbiology. 10 (7). Nature Publishing Group: 449–458. doi:10.1038/nrmicro2800. PMC 3467967. PMID 22669220.
- Paul, Sandip; Million-Weaver, Samuel; Chattopadhyay, Sujay; Sokurenko, Evgeni; Merrikh, Houra (2013). "Accelerated gene evolution through replication–transcription conflicts". Nature. 495 (7442). Nature Publishing Group: 512–5. Bibcode:2013Natur.495..512P. doi:10.1038/nature11989. PMC 3807732. PMID 23538833.
- Merrikh, Houra; Ferrazzoli, Alexander E.; Bougdour, Alexandre; Olivier-Mason, Anique; Lovett, Susan T. (2009). "A DNA damage response in Escherichia coli involving the alternative sigma factor, RpoS". Proceedings of the National Academy of Sciences. 106 (2): 611–616. Bibcode:2009PNAS..106..611M. doi:10.1073/pnas.0803665106. PMC 2626751. PMID 19124769.
- Lang, Kevin S.; Hall, Ashley N.; Merrikh, Christopher N.; Ragheb, Mark; Tabakh, Hannah; Pollock, Alex J.; Woodward, Joshua J.; Dreifus, Julia E.; Merrikh, Houra (August 2017). "Replication-transcription conflicts generate R-loops that orchestrate bacterial stress survival and pathogenesis". Cell. 170 (4). Cell Press: 787–799. doi:10.1016/j.cell.2017.07.044. PMC 5630229. PMID 28802046.
