= Ruth Van de Water =

American theoretical particle physicist

- Born: Washington, D.C., United States
- Education: College of William and Mary
- Scientific career
- Fields: Theoretical particle physics
- Workplaces: Brookhaven National Laboratory

Ruth Speel Van de Water is a senior scientist at Fermilab, as of 2026. Van de Water was an assistant physicist at the U.S. Department of Energy’s Brookhaven National Laboratory. She was also named a finalist in the postdoctoral category of the New York Academy of Sciences’ Blavatnik Awards for Young Scientists in 2011. Van de Water was one of six postdoctoral fellows and seven university faculty members chosen as finalists out of 150 applications for that year. Of those, four were chosen as winners.

== Early life and education ==
Van de Water was born in Washington, D.C., and raised in the nearby suburb of Alexandria, Virginia. Her parents met at graduate school when her mother was attending Harvard Divinity School, and her father was completing a PhD in economics at MIT. Her father then worked in the Social Security Administration and later in the Congressional Budget Office.

Van de Water earned her B.S. in physics from the College of William and Mary in 2000. One of her early inspirations to become a physicist was a course taught by the theoretical nuclear physicist, Dirk Walecka. In 2000 she was one of the recipients of the Don Edward Harrison Jr. Award for Excellence in Physics, awarded to the senior undergraduates who demonstrate the highest achievements in physics. During college she also sang in the early music ensemble.

She then earned her PhD in physics from the University of Washington, Seattle, in 2005. After this, she went on to do postdoctoral research at Fermi National Accelerator Laboratory from 2005 to 2008 before joining Brookhaven Lab as a Goldhaber Distinguished Fellow in 2008.

== Career ==
In the year 2011, she became an assistant physicist at Brookhaven. Van de Water has been honored with several awards from the University of Washington, Seattle, and the College of William and Mary for her outstanding research and academic achievement. in 2007, she also was a finalist for the Massachusetts Institute of Technology Pappalardo Fellowship in Physics.

== Research ==
Van de Water's work involves computer modeling of nuclear reactions using lattice quantum chromodynamics. Her work is performed on supercomputers including the New York Blue supercomputer, as well as computing facilities at both Argonne and Fermi National Laboratories, to make numerical computations for formulating precise theoretical predictions.

== Personal life ==
Van de Water is married and met her husband while in graduate school at the University of Washington.
