= Yossi Yovel =

Israeli biologist

- Born: 1979; Israel
- Occupation: Biologist

Yossi Yovel is a biologist at Tel Aviv University in Israel. He has been a faculty member at the Department of Zoology since 2011.

== Research ==
Yovel has performed studies on how bats use echolocation to perceive and navigate through their surroundings. His team develops miniature devices to monitor the behavior of bats. One notable result of the research is that bats use episodic memory (a type of long-term memory that involves the recollection of specific points in time) to plan ahead, an ability originally believed to be exclusive to humans.

== Accolades ==
Yovel was a 2021 laureate of the Israel Faculty Competition of the Blavatnik Awards for Young Scientists.
