= Michal Rivlin =

Neuroscientist

- מיכל ריבלין
- Born: Jerusalem
- Education: Hebrew University of Jerusalem
- Awards: Blavatnik Awards for Young Scientists
- Scientific career
- Workplaces: Weizmann Institute of Science; University of California, Berkeley
- Thesis: Synchronous oscillations in the basal ganglia cortical network : do they generate tremor and other symptoms of Parkinson's disease? (2009)

Michal Rivlin (Hebrew: מיכל ריבלין) is a Senior Scientist and Sara Lee Schupf Family Chair in Neurobiology at the Weizmann Institute of Science. She was awarded the 2019 Blavatnik Awards for Young Scientists for her research on the neuronal circuitry of the retina.

== Early life and education ==
Rivlin was born in Jerusalem. She served in the Sar-El program before studying mathematics and computer science at the Hebrew University of Jerusalem. She graduated in 2001 and moved to the Interdisciplinary Center for Neural Computation for her postgraduate research, where she was supported by a scholarship for excellence. Rivlin completed her doctoral degree in 2009. She moved to the University of California, Berkeley for her postdoctoral research, where she worked alongside Marla Feller as a Human Frontier Science Program Fellow. During her postdoctoral research she demonstrated that the modality encoded into retinal ganglion cells (RCGs) can be altered by certain stimuli. This can include directional sensitive RCGs, which reorient themselves after a short stimulation, and light sensitive RCGs which change their preferred polarity when light intensity changes.

== Research and career ==
In 2013 Rivlin joined the faculty of the Weizmann Institute of Science. At the Weizmann Institute of Science Rivlin lead a laboratory studying Dynamic Computations in the Retina. She studies how the neurons interpret the dynamic signals sent by the retina, and how they make use of changing information to build a coherent visual image. She makes use of two-photon excitation microscopy, electrophysiology and pharmacogenomics to understand the mechanisms involved in communication from the retina.

Rivlin believes that the retina can be used in the early diagnosis of neurodegenerative diseases such as Parkinson's disease. There is evidence that people with Parkinson's disease have decreased retinal dopamine levels. In an effort to use this as a characterisation tool, Rivlin studies the responses of the retina to different levels of dopamine. It is believed that the reduction of acetylcholine which occurs during Alzheimer's disease may also present in the retina. People who suffer from Alzheimer's disease experience a loss of retinal neurons. Rivlin believes that through measurements of the retinal neurons, in particular the starburst amacrine cells, it will be possible to determine the cholinergic levels, with which it will be possible to diagnose Alzheimer's disease early.

In 2019 Rivlin was awarded the Israel Blavatnik Awards for Young Scientists in Life Sciences.

=== Selected publications ===
Her publications include:

- Rivlin-Etzion, Michal (2011). "Closed-Loop Deep Brain Stimulation Is Superior in Ameliorating Parkinsonism". Neuron. 72 (2): 370–384. doi:10.1016/j.neuron.2011.08.023. PMID 22017994. S2CID 284811.
- Rivlin-Etzion, Michal (2006). "Basal ganglia oscillations and pathophysiology of movement disorders". Current Opinion in Neurobiology. 16 (6): 629–637. doi:10.1016/j.conb.2006.10.002. PMID 17084615. S2CID 12265763.
- Rivlin-Etzion, Michal (2011). "Transgenic Mice Reveal Unexpected Diversity of On-Off Direction-Selective Retinal Ganglion Cell Subtypes and Brain Structures Involved in Motion Processing". Journal of Neuroscience. 31 (24): 8760–8769. doi:10.1523/JNEUROSCI.0564-11.2011. PMC 3139540. PMID 21677160.

== Personal life ==
Rivlin is married to Yedidya Etzion, Head of Keshet High School, with whom she has four children.
