= Yi Zuo =

Neuroscientist

- Citizenship: United States
- Education: Tsinghua University, Northwestern University
- Known for: in vivo imaging
- Scientific career
- Fields: neuroscience
- Workplaces: University of California, Santa Cruz

Yi Zuo is a neuroscience professor and researcher born in China. She studies molecular, cellular and developmental biology. Zuo is currently an associate professor of Molecular, Cell and Developmental Biology at the University of California, Santa Cruz (UCSC), where she also heads a research lab.

== Biography ==
Zuo received a Bachelor's from Tsinghua University in 1998 came to the United States to do her PhD studies at Northwestern University in 2002. Her post-doctorate work was conducted at New York University and the University of Texas at Austin. Zuo found out that she was pregnant when she started interviewing for jobs after her post-doctorate work and when she came to UCSC, her son was three months old. Zuo began working at UCSC in January 2007. Her areas of study include looking at how glial cells possibly disrupt communication between neurons and brain plasticity. Zuo feels that doing science in academia is both fun and challenging because it allows her to satisfy her curiosity about the human brain and have a flexible schedule.

In 2007, Zuo received a Sloan Research Fellowship from the Alfred P. Sloan Foundation for her work on glia-neuron communication. The award includes a $45,000 grant towards unrestricted research which used modern imaging techniques and molecular manipulation to better study the ways that glia and neurons interact and influence memory and learning in the human brain. Also in 2007, Zuo received a $200,000 award from the Ellison Medical Foundation and the American Federation for Aging Research (AFAR). This award, given out over four years of research, supported her work looking into one of "the simplest synapse in the nervous system, the neuromuscular junction" and how it is affected by the aging process. Zuo received another $200,000 grant from the Dana Foundation to fund a research project which will study how the brain changes after a stroke and during rehabilitation. She was also a 2015 National Award finalist for the Blavatnik Awards for Young Scientists.

Zuo's studies and research have been published in Nature, The Journal of Neuroscience, The Journal of Visualized Experiments, and other journals.
