= David Ginger =

American physical chemist

- Education: Indiana University Bloomington B.S. (1997); University of Cambridge Ph.D. (2001)
- Scientific career
- Workplaces: University of Washington; Northwestern University
- Thesis: Optoelectronic properties of CdSe nanocrystals (2001)
- Doctoral advisor: Neil Greenham
- Other academic advisors: Victor E. Viola, Chad Mirkin
- Website: depts.washington.edu/gingerlb/

David S. Ginger is an American physical chemist. He is the B. Seymour Rabinovitch Endowed Professor of Chemistry at the University of Washington. He is also a Washington Research Foundation distinguished scholar, and chief scientist of the University of Washington Clean Energy Institute. In 2018, he was elected to the Washington State Academy of Sciences for his work on the microscopic investigation of materials for thin-film semiconductors. He was elected a member of the American Association for the Advancement of Science in 2012, and was a 2016 National Finalist of the Blavatnik Awards for Young Scientists.

== Education ==
Ginger attended Indiana University Bloomington, earning B.S. degrees in chemistry and physics in 1997. During his undergraduate degree, he performed research with Prof. Victor E. Viola. Ginger pursued graduate school as a British Marshall Scholar and an NSF Graduate Fellow in Physics at the University of Cambridge, where his Ph.D. thesis advisor was Prof. Neil Greenham. Ginger earned his Ph.D. in 2001 with a thesis entitled Optoelectronic properties of CdSe nanocrystals. After a joint NIH and DuPont Postdoctoral Fellowship at Northwestern University with Prof. Chad Mirkin, he joined the faculty of the University of Washington.

== Research ==
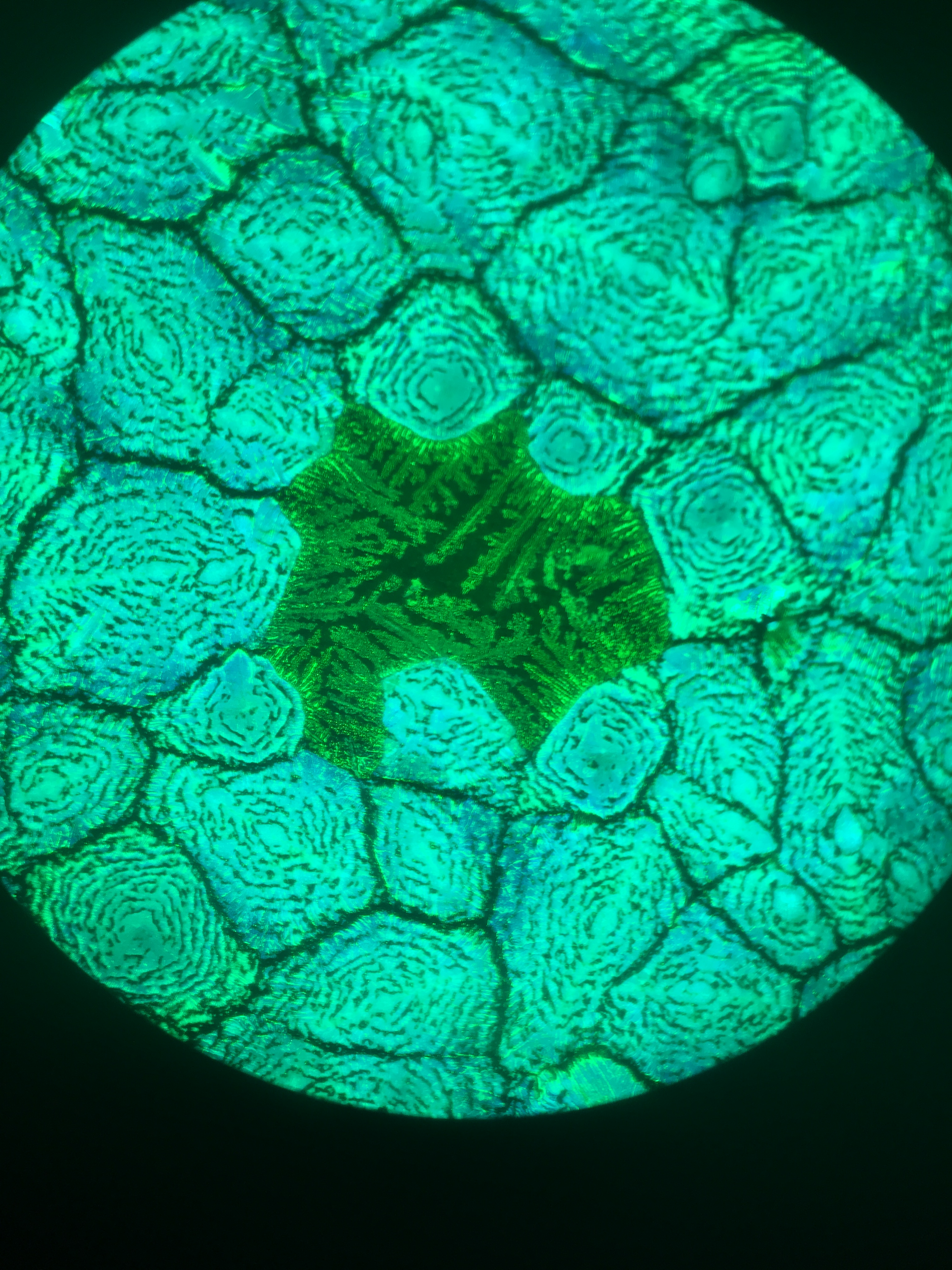
Image of perovskite domains taken using fluorescence microscopy.

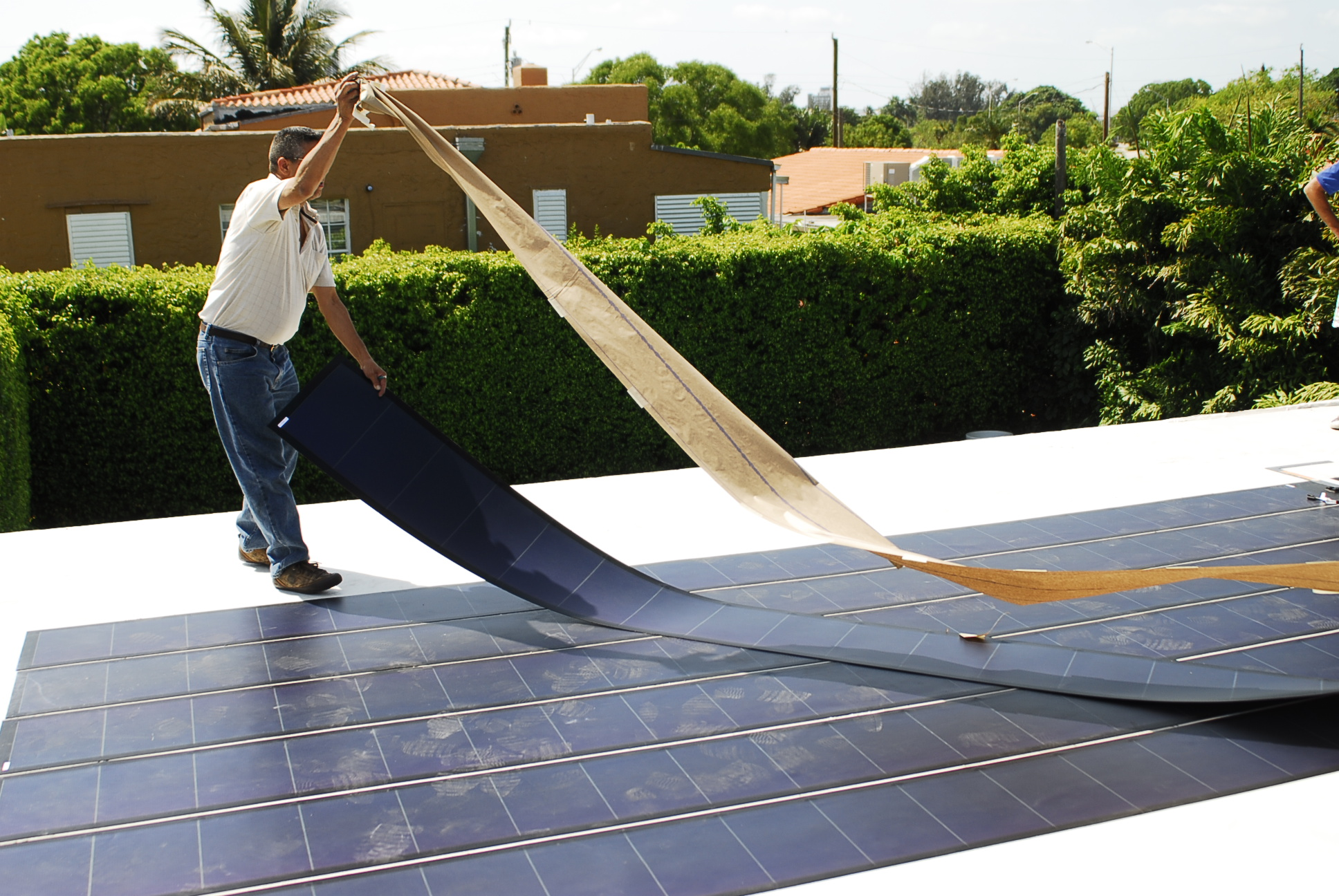
Example of a solar panel with thin film semiconductors.

Ginger specializes in the physical chemistry of materials with applications in energy, electronics, and sensing. His team has used combinations of optical and scanning probe microscopy to examine the properties of nanomaterials, particularly thin film semiconductors. The lab has studied mixed ionic/electronic transport materials such as those used in bioelectronics batteries, and most notably in photovoltaic materials such as halide perovskites and organic photovoltaics.
