= Kirsty Penkman =

Biochemist and geochemist, biomolecular archaeologist

Kirsty Elizabeth Helena Penkman is a British analytical chemist and geochemist known for her research in biomolecular archaeology, the use of ancient DNA, amino acid dating, and other biomolecules in order to date fossils and learn about the world as it was in prehistoric times. She is a professor of chemistry at the University of York.

Penkman's research has dated early archaeology found in East Anglia to 700,000 years ago, the oldest artifacts known in Northern Europe. She has argued that climate change and human landscape modification are likely to destroy the ancient biological materials that go into her studies.

In 2008, the Quaternary Research Association gave Penkman their Lewis Penny Medal for her contributions to the study of Quaternary strata. In 2012 she was a winner of the Philip Leverhulme Prize in Earth, ocean, and atmospheric sciences. Penkman is the 2016 winner of the Joseph Black Award of the Royal Society of Chemistry "for rigorous and ground-breaking work in the field of amino acid racemisation dating and its application to earth and archaeological sciences". She is also the winner of the 2017 Pittcon Royal Society of Chemistry Award, and the winner in the Chemistry category of the 2020 UK Blavatnik Awards for Young Scientists.

Penkman has an M.Chem. from University of Oxford and a Ph.D. from Newcastle University. Her 2005 doctoral thesis title was "Amino acid geochronology: a closed system approach to test and refine the UK model".
