= Celeste Nelson =

American academic

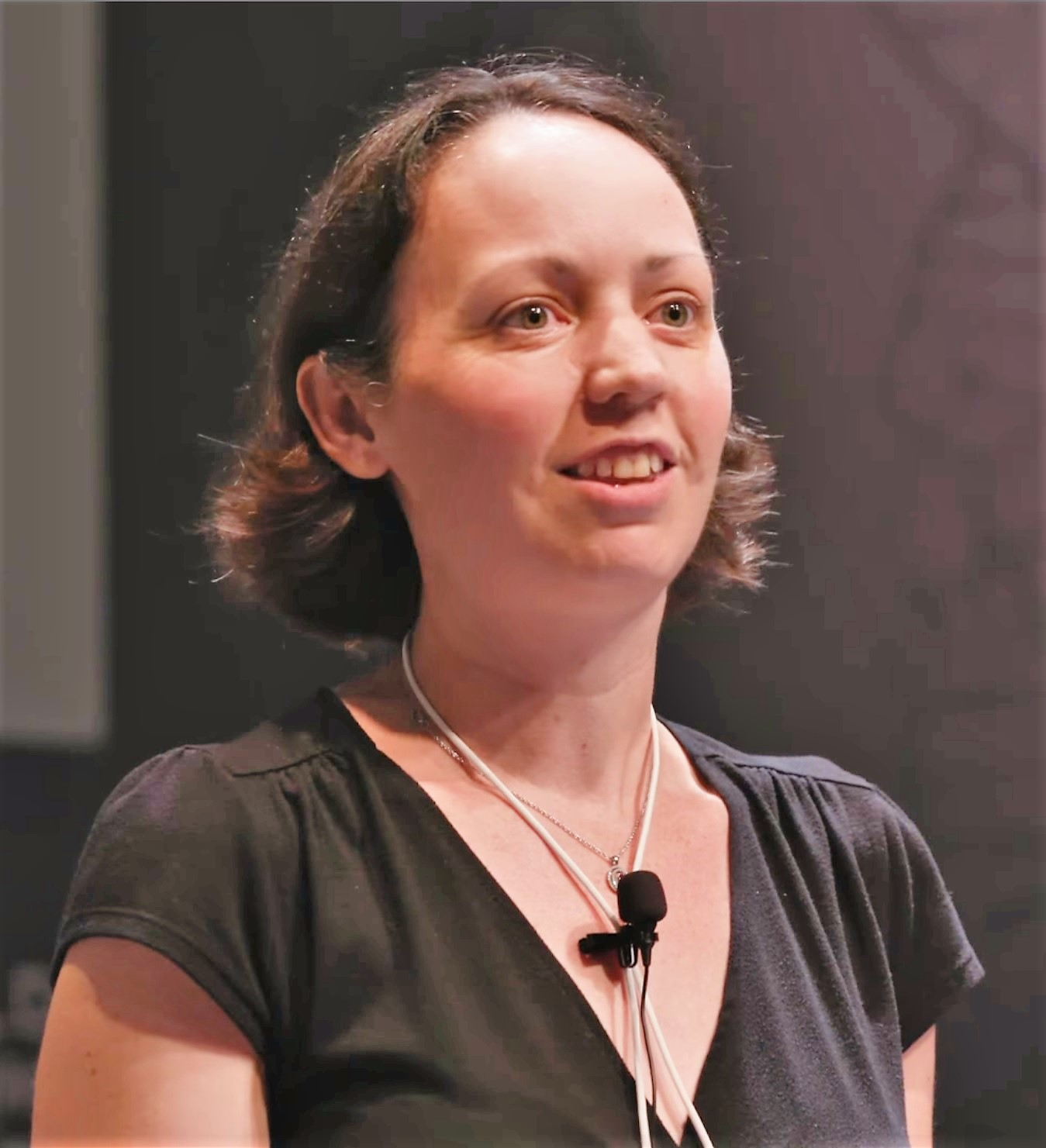
- Nelson speaks at the World Economic Forum in 2017
- Born: Celeste M. Nelson; August 21, 1976 (age 50); Colorado Springs, Colorado
- Education: Johns Hopkins University (PhD); Massachusetts Institute of Technology (SB)
- Awards: Tau Beta Pi; Phi Beta Kappa; Innovators Under 35; Sloan Research Fellowship; Blavatnik Award for Young Scientists
- Scientific career
- Fields: Developmental biology Tissue engineering Morphogenesis; Mechanobiology
- Workplaces: Princeton University; Lawrence Berkeley National Laboratory
- Thesis: The regulation of endothelial cell form and function by VE-cadherin (2003)
- Website: cmngroup.princeton.edu

Celeste M. Nelson (born 21 August 1976) is a professor of chemical and biological engineering and the director of the program in engineering biology at Princeton University. She is a Fellow of the American Institute for Medical and Biological Engineering (AIMBE) and was a finalist in the 2017 and 2018 Blavatnik Awards for Young Scientists.

== Early life and education ==
Nelson was born in Colorado Springs, Colorado. She became interested in biology as a teenager, but it wasn't until she spent time in a laboratory that she realised how much she enjoyed experiments. She studied biology and chemical engineering at the Massachusetts Institute of Technology (MIT) and graduated in 1998. Whilst at MIT Nelson was a member of the Tau Beta Pi engineering honour society and graduated in Phi Beta Kappa. Nelson moved to Johns Hopkins University School of Medicine for her graduate studies, working on biomedical engineering under the supervision of Christopher S. Chen.

== Research and career ==
Nelson was a postdoctoral research fellow at the Lawrence Berkeley National Laboratory (LBNL) where she worked alongside Mina J. Bissell in the Division of Life Sciences. Whilst at LBNL Nelson was awarded the outstanding performance award. She completed a course in embryology at the Woods Hole Marine Biological Laboratory in 2007. Nelson joined Princeton University as an assistant professor in 2007. She was promoted to associate professor in 2012 and full professor in 2016. Her research considers how cells within tissues integrate complicated biological systems spatially and dynamically. At Princeton Nelson leads the Tissue Morphodynamic Laboratory, which combines engineering, cell biology and developmental biology.

She investigates the morphogenesis process that builds both the mammary gland and vertebrate lung. To interrogate the process by which organs generate their internal anatomies Nelson created a protocol to grow these structures in a laboratory. She identified that during morphogenesis, long-range communication between individual cells within biological tissue determines the pattern formation. She identified several genes that are essential for branching tissue to properly develop and studied how they work together to coordinate the branching process. She showed that the signals that initiate tissue branching can also act to reawaken certain tumours. In 2018 she coordinated a Royal Society meeting on the mechanics of embryonic development.

=== Awards and honors ===
Her awards and honors include:

- 2007 David and Lucile Packard Foundation Fellow
- 2009 E. Lawrence Keyes, Jr Faculty Advancement Award
- 2009 Princeton Engineering Commendation for Outstanding Teaching
- 2010 Alfred P. Sloan Research Fellow in Molecular Biology
- 2010 Innovators Under 35 awarded by MIT Technology Review
- 2011 American Institute of Chemical Engineers Allan P. Colburn Award
- 2012 Camille Dreyfus Teacher-Scholar Award
- 2014 Princeton School of Engineering and Applied Science Distinguished Teacher Award
- 2016 Elected Fellow of the American Institute for Medical and Biological Engineering
- 2016 Princeton University President’s Award for Distinguished Teaching
- 2016 Howard Hughes Medical Institute (HHMI) Faculty Scholar
- 2017 Blavatnik Award for Young Scientists in Life Sciences
- 2018 Blavatnik Award for Young Scientists in Life Sciences
- 2018 Princeton University Engineering Commendation for Outstanding Teaching

=== Selected publications ===
Her publications include:

- Tissue Morphogenesis: methods and protocols
- Cell shape, cytoskeletal tension, and RhoA regulate stem cell lineage commitment
- Of extracellular matrix, scaffolds, and signaling: tissue architecture regulates development, homeostasis, and cancer
- Modeling dynamic reciprocity: engineering three-dimensional culture models of breast architecture, function, and neoplastic transformation

== Personal life ==
Nelson is married with one child.
