= Elza Erkip =

American computer engineer

Elza Erkip is a Turkish-American electrical and computer engineer, professor and wireless technology researcher at New York University.

== Education ==
Erkip received her B.S. in Electrical and Electronics Engineering from Middle East Technical University in Turkey, and her M.S. and Ph.D. (1996, under Thomas Cover) in Electrical Engineering from Stanford University. She ranked among the top 1% of highly cited scholars in computer science from 2002 to 2012 according to Thomson Reuters.

== Background ==
Erkip is one of the researchers at NYU WIRELESS, where they are currently conducting in-depth research into 5G Wireless cell technology using millimeter wave (mmWave) wireless communications. She is also a fellow and member of the Board of Governors of IEEE, and a member of The Science Academy Society of Turkey.

== Awards ==
- IEEE Fellow, 2011, for contributions to multi-user and cooperative communications.
- Finalist, The New York Academy of Sciences Blavatnik Awards for Young Scientists, 2010
- Best Paper Award, IEEE ICC Communication Theory Symposium, 2007
- Student Paper Award, co-author, IEEE International Symposium on Information Theory, 2007
- IEEE Communications Society Stephen O. Rice Paper Prize in the Field of Communication Theory, 2004
- National Science Foundation CAREER Award, 2001
