= Bianxiao Cui =

Chemist

- Born: Henan, China
- Education: University of Science and Technology of China (BS); University of Chicago (PhD)
- Scientific career
- Workplaces: Stanford University

Bianxiao Cui is the current Job and Gertrud Tamaki Professor of Chemistry and a fellow of the Stanford Neuroscience Institute at Stanford University.

== Education and academic career ==
=== Education ===
Bianxiao Cui graduated from University of Science and Technology of China in 1998 with a bachelor's degree in material science. She received her Ph.D. in 2002 from the University of Chicago under Stuart Rice in physical chemistry. Between 2002 and 2007, she was a postdoctoral associate with Steven Chu at Stanford University. In 2008, she was appointed as the assistant professor in chemistry with Stanford University, followed by promotion to associated professorship with tenure in 2015, full professorship in 2018, and Job and Gertrud Tamaki Professor of Chemistry in 2020. She is a current member of the Bio-X Scientific Leadership Council.

=== Research ===
The Bianxiao Cui lab develops new tools to advance understandings of signal transduction in the complicated environment of living cells with tools drawn from chemistry, materials science, engineering, and molecular biology. Her research is focused on four major directions: (1) Nano-bio interface: membrane curvature and intracellular signaling; (2) Bioelectronics: nanoscale electrodes for intracellular electrophysiology; (3) Optical Electrophysiology using electrochromic materials; and (4) Optical control of protein functions in neurons. The lab has special interest in membrane curvature, nano-bio interface, bioelectronics, and neurobiology.

=== Awards ===
Her awards and distinctions include the Packard Fellowships in Science and Engineering, Searle Scholar Award, Barany Award from Biophysical Society, NIH New Innovator Award, and NSF CAREER Award.
