= Susan Lovett =

American molecular biologist

Susan Thomas Lovett
- Born: Rochester, New York
- Education: Cornell University; University of California, Berkeley
- Scientific career
- Workplaces: Brandeis University; Lawrence Berkeley National Laboratory
- Thesis: The recJ gene of Escherichia coli (1983)

Susan Thomas Lovett is an American molecular biologist who is the Abraham S. and Gertrude Burg Professor of Microbiology at Brandeis University. She is interested in the mechanisms that allow the genetic material in cells to remain stable over time.

== Early life and education ==
Lovett was born in Rochester, New York. She spent her childhood in Virginia and Ohio. Lovett was an undergraduate student at Cornell University. She moved to the University of California, Berkeley for her doctoral research, where she investigated Escherichia coli. She was a postdoctoral researcher at Lawrence Berkeley National Laboratory.

== Research and career ==
Lovett joined Brandeis University in 1989. She is a molecular biologist who studies the mechanisms that underpin DNA repair. In particular, Lovett has studied how cells protect their genetic information and avoid genetic mutation. These strategies help to tackle cancer and prevent cells from ageing. She has worked on the model organism Escherichia coli since the beginning of her career, and identified a secondary DNA damage response that is independent of the well-documented SOS response. Lovett identified many of the enzymes involves with DNA repair, including the post-transcriptional regulatory protein IraD, the ExoX and RecJ exonucleases, the Eubacterial protein RadA/Sms and the DNA helicase YoaA.

Amongst the repair mechanisms, Lovett has studied mutagenesis at the replication fork and how it coordinates with cellular cycles. She identified a GTPase proteins that couples cellular division with events at the replication fork. She has shown that chain-terminating drugs can be used, for example the AIDS drug, azidothymadine) to accumulate replication gaps, and that cellular nutrition impacts replication and repair.

Lovett has investigated the mutational hotspots that occur when strands of DNA do not align during the replication processes. Aberrant replication results in the rearrangement of DNA, which impacts the formation of mutational hotspots and exonuclease.

From 2006 to 2010, Lovett taught on the Cold Spring Harbor Laboratory course in Advanced Bacterial Genetics.

== Awards and honors ==
- 2006 Elected Fellow of the American Society for Microbiology
- 2008 Appointed to the Board of Directors of the Genetics Society of America
- 2013 Elected Fellow of the American Association for the Advancement of Science
- 2017 Brandeis University Dean of Arts and Sciences Service Award
- 2020 Elected Fellow of the American Academy of Arts and Sciences
- 2021 Elected Fellow of the National Academy of Sciences

== Selected publications ==
- Robert J Nichols; Saunak Sen; Yoe Jin Choo; et al. (December 23, 2010). "Phenotypic landscape of a bacterial cell". Cell. 144 (1): 143–156. doi:10.1016/j.cell.2010.11.052. ISSN 0092-8674. PMC 3060659. PMID 21185072. Wikidata Q33780274.
- S T Lovett; R D Kolodner (April 1, 1989). "Identification and purification of a single-stranded-DNA-specific exonuclease encoded by the recJ gene of Escherichia coli". Proceedings of the National Academy of Sciences of the United States of America. 86 (8): 2627–2631. Bibcode:1989PNAS...86.2627L. doi:10.1073/pnas.86.8.2627. ISSN 0027-8424. PMC 286970. PMID 2649886. Wikidata Q33849909.
- M Bzymek; S T Lovett (July 1, 2001). "Instability of repetitive DNA sequences: the role of replication in multiple mechanisms". Proceedings of the National Academy of Sciences of the United States of America. 98 (15): 8319–8325. Bibcode:2001PNAS...98.8319B. doi:10.1073/pnas.111008398. ISSN 0027-8424. PMC 37438. PMID 11459970. Wikidata Q37096065.
