= Janelle Ayres =

American immunologist

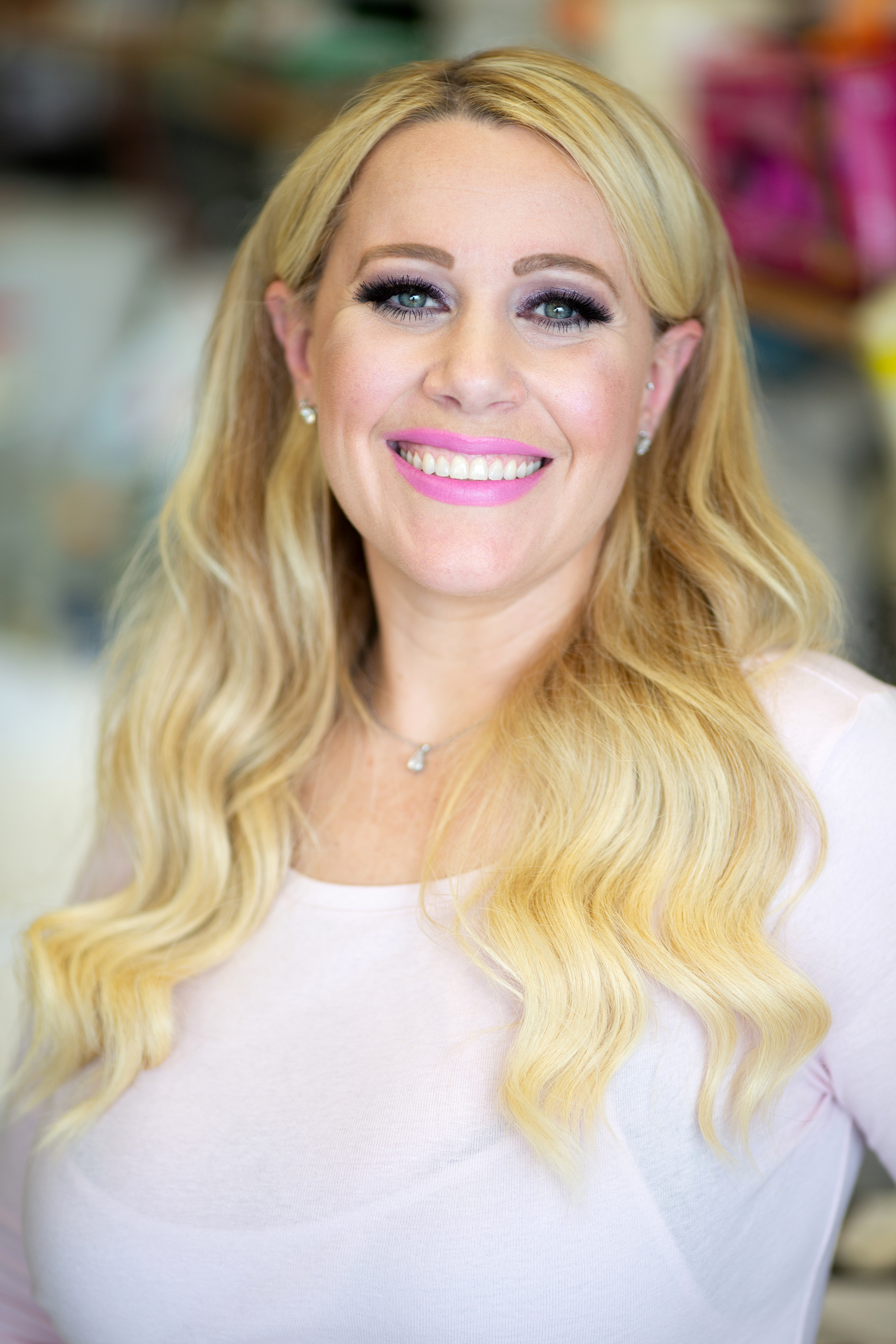
- Education: University of California, Berkeley (BA); Stanford University School of Medicine (PhD)
- Known for: Host-pathogen interactions with the microbiome
- Scientific career
- Fields: Immunology, Microbiology
- Workplaces: Salk Institute for Biological Studies

Janelle S. Ayres is an American immunologist, microbiologist and physiologist, member of the NOMIS Center for Immunobiology and Microbial Pathogenesis and Helen McLoraine Developmental Chair at the Salk Institute for Biological Sciences. Her research focuses on the relation of host-pathogen interactions with the microbiome.

== Education ==
Ayres received her BA in molecular and cell biology at the University of California, Berkeley and her PhD at Stanford University School of Medicine in the laboratory of David Schneider, working on resistance and infection tolerance using the model organism Drosophila. She then completed a postdoctoral fellowship with Russell Vance at the University of California, Berkeley where she published on the role of innate immunity in the recognition of drug resistant pathobionts, or potentially virulent species from the microbiome.

== Research ==
Ayres current research focuses on how microbes can promote the health of their host organism. She discovered the "Cooperative Defense System", the bodies ability to adapt to a pathogen and cooperate with it, instead of eliminating it. She uses mathematical and evolutionary models to predict how the beneficial microbes in the gut can be used to fight diseases. Specifically, her lab has demonstrated how a strain of E. coli prevents inflammation-induced wasting, and how a strain Salmonella inhibits sickness-induced anorexia, thus protecting their host from the deleterious effects of infection.

== Publications ==
1. Troha, K., Ayres, J.S. Metabolic Adaptations to Infections at the Organismal Level. (2020) Trends in Immunology. DOI: 10.1016/j.it.2019.12.001
2. Ayres, J.S. Immunometabolism of infections. (2019) Nature Reviews Immunology. DOI: 10.1038/s41577-019-0266-9
3. McCarville, J.L., Ayres, J.S. Host-Pathogen Relationship Advice: Fat Protects against a Broken Heart. (2019) Cell Metabolism. 30(3):409-411. DOI: 10.1016/j.cmet.2019.08.007
4. Wallace, M., Green, C.R., Roberts, L.S., Lee, Y.M., McCarville, J.L., Sanchez-Gurmaches, J., Meurs, N., Gengatharan, J.M., Hover, J.D., Phillips, S.A., Ciaraldi, T.P., Guertin, D.A., Cabrales, P., Ayres, J.S., Nomura, D.K., Loomba, R., Metallo, C.M. Enzyme promiscuity drives branched-chain fatty acid synthesis in adipose tissues. (2018) Nature Chemical Biology. 14(11):1021-1031. DOI: 10.1038/s41589-018-0132-2
5. Sanchez, K.K., Chen, G.Y., Schieber, A.M.P., Redford, S.E., Shokhirev, M.N., Leblanc, M., Lee, Y.M., Ayres, J.S. Cooperative Metabolic Adaptations in the Host Can Favor Asymptomatic Infection and Select for Attenuated Virulence in an Enteric Pathogen. (2018) Cell. 175(1):146-158. DOI: 10.1016/j.cell.2018.07.016
6. Chen, G.Y., Ayres, J.S. When the Gut Gets Tough, the Enterocytes Get Going. (2018) Immunity. 48(5):837-839. DOI: 10.1016/j.immuni.2018.04.036
7. McCarville, J.L., Ayres, J.S. Disease tolerance: concept and mechanisms. (2018) Current Opinion in Immunology. 50:88-93. DOI: 10.1016/j.coi.2017.12.003
8. Lee, Y.M., Ayres, J.S. Decoding the intestinal epithelium cell by cell. (2018) Nature Immunology. 19(1):7-9. DOI: 10.1038/s41590-017-0011-0
9. Rao, S., Ayres, J.S. Resistance and tolerance defenses in cancer: Lessons from infectious diseases. (2017) Seminars in Immunology. 32:54-61. DOI: 10.1016/j.smim.2017.08.004
10. Rauch, I., Deets, K.A., Ji, D.X., von Moltke, J., Tenthorey, J.L., Lee, A.Y., Philip, N.H., Ayres, J.S., Brodsky, I.E., Gronert, K., Vance, R.E. NAIP-NLRC4 Inflammasomes Coordinate Intestinal Epithelial Cell Expulsion with Eicosanoid and IL-18 Release via Activation of Caspase-1 and -8. (2017) Immunity. 46(4):649-659. DOI: 10.1016/j.immuni.2017.03.016
11. Rao, S., Schieber, A.M., O'Connor, C.P., Leblanc, M., Michel, D., Ayres, J.S. Pathogen-Mediated Inhibition of Anorexia Promotes Host Survival and Transmission. (2017) Cell. 168(3):503-516.e12. DOI: 10.1016/j.cell.2017.01.006
12. Ayres, J.S. Microbes Dress for Success: Tolerance or Resistance? (2017) Trends in Microbiology. 25(1):1-3. DOI: 10.1016/j.tim.2016.11.006
13. Schieber, A.M., Ayres, J.S. Thermoregulation as a disease tolerance defense strategy. (2016) Pathog Dis. 74(9). DOI: 10.1093/femspd/ftw106
14. Ayres, J.S. Disease Tolerance Trick or Treat: Give Your Brain Something Good to Eat. (2016) Cell. 166(6):1368-70. DOI: 10.1016/j.cell.2016.08.034
15. Ayres, J.S. Cooperative Microbial Tolerance Behaviors in Host-Microbiota Mutualism. (2016) Cell. 165(6):1323-1331. DOI: 10.1016/j.cell.2016.05.049
16. Shen, R., Wang, B., Giribaldi, M.G., Ayres, J., Thomas, J.B., Montminy, M. Neuronal energy-sensing pathway promotes energy balance by modulating disease tolerance. (2016) Proceedings of the National Academy of Sciences of the United States of America. 113(23):E3307-14. DOI: 10.1073/pnas.1606106113
17. Schieber, A.M., Lee, Y.M., Chang, M.W., Leblanc, M., Collins, B., Downes, M., Evans, R.M., Ayres, J.S. Disease tolerance mediated by microbiome E. coli involves inflammasome and IGF-1 signaling. (2015) Science. 350(6260):558-63. DOI: 10.1126/science.aac6468
18. Ayres, J.S. Inflammasome-microbiota interplay in host physiologies. (2013) Cell Host & Microbe. 14(5):491-7. DOI: 10.1016/j.chom.2013.10.013
19. Manzanillo, P.S., Ayres, J.S., Watson, R.O., Collins, A.C., Souza, G., Rae, C.S., Schneider, D.S., Nakamura, K., Shiloh, M.U., Cox, J.S. The ubiquitin ligase parkin mediates resistance to intracellular pathogens. (2013) Nature. 501(7468):512-6. DOI: 10.1038/nature12566
20. von Moltke, J., Ayres, J.S., Kofoed, E.M., Chavarría-Smith, J., Vance, R.E. Recognition of bacteria by inflammasomes. (2013) Annual Review of Immunology. 31:73-106. DOI: 10.1146/annurev-immunol-032712-095944
21. Ayres, J.S., Trinidad, N.J., Vance, R.E. Lethal inflammasome activation by a multidrug-resistant pathobiont upon antibiotic disruption of the microbiota. (2012) Nature Medicine. 18(5):799-806. DOI: 10.1038/nm.2729
22. Ayres, J.S., Vance, R.E. Cellular teamwork in antibacterial innate immunity. (2012) Nature Immunology. 13(2):115-7. DOI: 10.1038/ni.2212

== Award and honors ==
- Blavatnik National Award for Young Scientists (2018)
- NIH Director's Pioneer Award (2018)
- Senior Research Award, Crohn's and Colitis Foundation of America (2016)
- DARPA Young Faculty Award (2015)
- Kavli Fellow, National Academy of Sciences (2015)
- Searle Scholars Award, Searle Scholars Program (2014)
- Career Development Award in the Biomedical Sciences, The Ray Thomas Edwards Foundation (2014)
- Howard Hughes Medical Institute (HHMI) Investigator (2024)
