= Daphne Bavelier =

French professor and cognitive neuroscientist

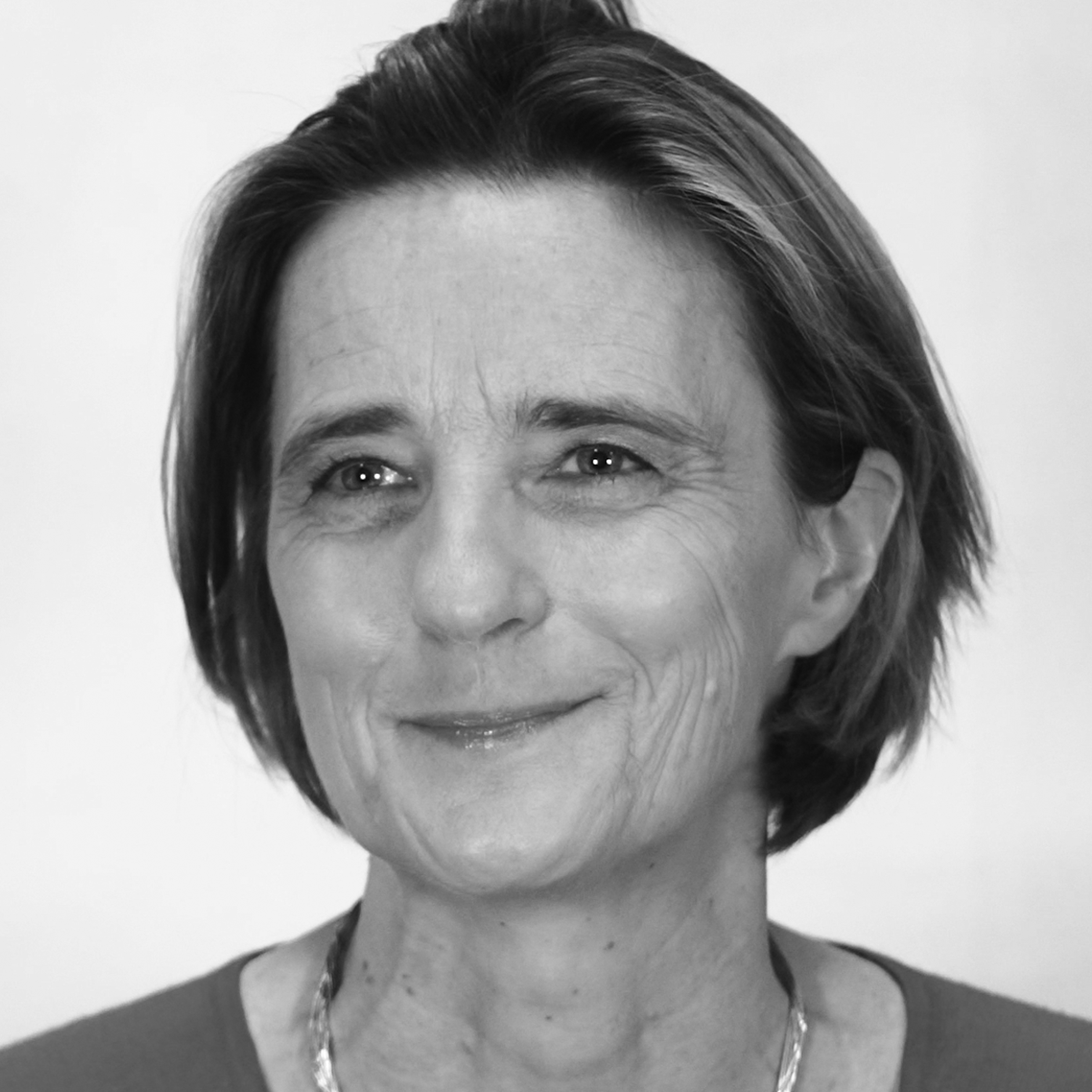
- Education: École normale supérieure (BSc); Massachusetts Institute of Technology (PhD)
- Awards: Klaus J. Jacobs Research Prize (2019)
- Scientific career
- Fields: Cognitive Neuroscience
- Workplaces: University of Geneva; University of Rochester; Georgetown University; Salk Institute; Massachusetts Institute of Technology; École normale supérieure (Paris)
- Website: https://www.unige.ch/fapse/brainlearning/

Daphné Bavelier is a French cognitive neuroscientist specialized in brain plasticity and learning. She is full Professor at the University of Geneva in the Faculty of Psychology and Educational Sciences. She heads the Brain and Learning lab at Campus Biotech in Geneva, Switzerland.

== Education and career ==
Bavelier received her undergraduate education at the École normale supérieure in biology, before moving to the Massachusetts Institute of Technology in 1988 to pursue a PhD in Brain and Cognitive sciences in Professor Molly Potter's laboratory.

She received a postdoctoral fellowship from the James S. McDonnell Foundation to carry research in brain plasticity and learning at the Salk Institute under Professor Helen Neville.

In 1996, she became assistant professor at the Georgetown Institute for Cognitive and Computational Sciences at Georgetown University. She then joined the Brain and Cognitive Science department at the University of Rochester in 1999, before moving to the department of Psychology within the Faculty of Psychology and Education Science at the University of Geneva in 2011.

== Research Interest ==
Bavelier’s interest lies in how the brain adapts to changes in experience. Early in her career, she investigated how being born deaf and using sign language alters brain organization for attentional functions and language processing. In 2000, Bavelier and her student (and now colleague) C. Shawn Green made an unexpected discovery that video games could be powerful tools to induce brain plasticity. In particular, action video games were shown to enhance attention. Since then, Bavelier has been interested in understanding how to leverage video games, and more generally digital technologies, to facilitate brain plasticity and learning. The Brain and Learning Lab now focuses on clarifying the factors that promote learning and brain plasticity using a multidisciplinary approach (behavior, brain imaging, eye tracking and vital statistics).

With an additional interest in translational work, Bavelier is one of the co-founders of Akili Interactive, a company dedicated to leverage video games for therapeutic interventions.

== Honors and awards ==
- 2019. Recipient of the 2019 Klaus J. Jacobs Research Prize
- 2018. TIGA Awards, Anxiety-relief video game shortlisted in the “Best Educational Game”
- 2018. Nominated fellow of the American Psychological Society in recognition of her "sustained outstanding contributions to the science of psychology"
- 2008. Blavatnik Awards for Young Scientist – Finalist in the faculty category
- 2000-2004. John Merck Scholar Award
- 1999-2000. Award for Beginning Academics – National Science Foundation
- 1988-1989. Award from the American Women's Group in Paris to study abroad

== Science in the public interest ==
- 2019. 100 Women and Thousands More, promoting women and their exceptional careers
- 2016-2018. Expert on Human Enhancement, Global Future Councils World Economic Forum
- 2017. Selected as "100 personnalités qui font la Suisse romande", Le Temps
- 2014-2016. Expert on the ‘New Vision for Education’ project of the World Economic Forum
- 2016. Research on video games featured in Scientific American
- 2012. Expert at the meeting on 'Interactive Media, Attention and Well-being' hosted by the White House Office of Science and Technology Policy
- 2012. TED Talk - Your brain on video games
- 2009. Ranked among the top 50 French in the US by France-Amerique
