= Christoph Bregler =

American computer scientist and visual effects artist

- Bregler Keynote at AI Summit 2026, Berkeley
- Other name: Chris Bregler
- Education: Karlsruhe Institute of Technology; University of California, Berkeley
- Occupations: Computer scientist, visual effects artist
- Awards: Academy Award for Technical Achievement from the Academy of Motion Picture Arts and Sciences (2016); IEEE Fellow (2026); Sloan Research Fellowship (2003)
- Website: chris.bregler.com

Christoph Bregler, also known as Chris Bregler, is a German-American computer scientist and visual effects artist. He serves as senior director and distinguished scientist of Google DeepMind.

Bregler's research has included visual speech recognition and synthesis, markerless motion capture, non-rigid three-dimensional reconstruction, human pose estimation, and the analysis of manipulated media. His 1997 Video Rewrite project was an early system capable of automatically altering video footage so that a person appeared to speak words not present in the original recording.

He previously served as a professor in the department of computer science at New York University.

== Early life and education ==
Bregler grew up in Eppingen, Baden-Württemberg, Germany. He studied computer science at the University of Karlsruhe, where he earned a diploma in computer science. During his time at the university of Karlsruhe, Bregler worked on audiovisual speech recognition. His diploma thesis, Lippenlesen als Unterstützung zur robusten automatischen Spracherkennung ("Lipreading as support for robust automatic speech recognition"), examined the use of visual lip movements to improve automatic speech recognition.

He subsequently moved to the United States and attended the University of California, Berkeley, where he received an M.S. in computer science in 1995 and a Ph.D. in 1998.

== Career ==
Bregler worked in industry before and alongside his academic career. He was a software engineer at Hewlett-Packard from 1991 to 1992 and also held research or technical positions at IBM and Interval Research. He later worked as a consultant for Disney Feature Animation. In 1999, Bregler joined Stanford University as an assistant professor in the Department of Computer Science. He was affiliated with the university's computer graphics research community and worked in computer vision, graphics, machine learning and human motion analysis. In 2002, he joined New York University, where he became a professor in the Department of Computer Science at the Courant Institute of Mathematical Sciences. At NYU, he directed the Movement Lab, which focused on computer vision and methods for capturing, reconstructing and analyzing human movement. Alongside his academic work, Bregler also worked for Lucasfilm and Industrial Light & Magic on motion-tracking and visual-effects technologies. His work with Ronald Mallet included the development of Industrial Light & Magic's Geometry Tracker, which later received an Academy Award for Technical Achievement from the Academy of Motion Picture Arts and Sciences in 2016. Bregler later joined Google and became a senior director and distinguished scientist at Google DeepMind. His work there has included computer vision, synthetic media, media integrity and related areas of artificial intelligence. In 2026, the Computing Research Association identified him as a senior director at Google DeepMind's Frontier AI organization.

=== Visual speech and motion analysis ===
Building on his earlier work on audiovisual speech recognition, Bregler developed methods for analyzing and synthesizing visible speech. In 1997, together with Michele Covell and Malcolm Slaney, he developed Video Rewrite, a system that used existing video footage to generate new sequences in which a person appeared to articulate words that had not been spoken in the original recording. The system analyzed speech sounds and corresponding mouth movements and was developed in part for applications such as film dubbing. Bregler subsequently worked on recovering articulated and deformable motion from video. His research included methods for tracking human bodies, modeling human dynamics and reconstructing non-rigid three-dimensional shapes from two-dimensional image sequences. These approaches contributed to techniques for extracting human movement without requiring the conventional reflective markers used in motion-capture studios. His later work at the NYU Movement Lab investigated whether characteristic movement patterns could also be used to distinguish individuals. The research examined features including gait, gestures and body timing as potential behavioral biometric signatures that could be recovered from video.

=== Visual effects ===
Bregler's work on motion tracking and reconstruction was also applied to film production and visual effects. Together with Ronald Mallet, he designed and engineered Industrial Light & Magic's Geometry Tracker, a general-purpose system for tracking geometry and solving match-animation problems. The technology facilitated the integration of computer-generated and live-action elements. Bregler and Mallet received an Academy Award for Technical Achievement from the Academy of Motion Picture Arts and Sciences for the Geometry Tracker in 2016.

=== Sports and human-performance analysis ===
Bregler's motion-analysis research was also applied to sports, biomechanics and medicine. Three-dimensional motion-capture systems could be used to reconstruct an athlete's movements from multiple viewpoints and quantify properties including joint angles, acceleration and biomechanical stress, with potential applications in training, rehabilitation and injury prevention. The techniques were applied to professional baseball and to the analysis of pitching mechanics, including three-dimensional reconstructions of Mariano Rivera's delivery. Bregler's research also examined applications of motion capture to sports medicine and the quantitative improvement of athletic performance. The work was later extended to Olympic swimming and diving. Motion-analysis techniques were used to examine the movements of elite swimmers, including Dana Vollmer, whose butterfly stroke and underwater dolphin kick were reconstructed and analyzed in three dimensions.

=== Synthetic media and media integrity ===
Bregler's later research has addressed synthetic media and the manipulation and verification of digital imagery. This work developed from themes already present in his earlier research on visual speech synthesis, facial re-animation and human-motion modeling. His work has included both creative applications of synthetic media and methods for reducing harmful manipulation and improving media integrity.

=== Applications of motion analysis ===
Bregler's research has applied computer-vision and motion-capture techniques to sports, biomechanics and human-performance analysis. Three-dimensional motion analysis can be used to reconstruct an athlete's movements and measure properties such as joint angles, acceleration and biomechanical stress, with applications including athletic training, injury prevention and rehabilitation.

The techniques were applied to professional baseball, including three-dimensional analysis of Mariano Rivera's pitching motion.

Bregler and his collaborators also developed techniques for analyzing elite swimmers and divers. Their work reconstructed the movements of Olympic swimmer Dana Vollmer, including her butterfly stroke and underwater dolphin kick, and was also applied to competitive diving.

Motion analysis was also applied to the performing arts. A project involving New York Philharmonic music director Alan Gilbert reconstructed the conductor's gestures in three dimensions, including detailed movements of his hands and body.

Bregler's research further investigated whether characteristic patterns of movement, including gait and gestures, could function as behavioral biometric signatures for identifying individuals from video.

== Awards ==
Bregler was awarded a Sloan Research Fellowship in computer science in 2003 while at New York University.

In 2008, Bregler, alongside Jitendra Malik, was awarded the IEEE test of time award, called the IEEE Longuet-Higgins Prize for "Fundamental Contributions in Computer Vision that have withstood the test of time", for his work on “Tracking people with twists and exponential maps”.

In 2016, Bregler, alongside Ronald Mallet, was awarded the Academy Award for Technical Achievement in the Science and Technology category from the Academy of Motion Picture Arts and Sciences, "for his work on marker-free motion capture technology". His technology has been used in films such as Star Wars, Avatar, Star Trek, and The Avengers.

In 2026, Bregler was named a fellow of the Institute of Electrical and Electronics Engineers, "for contributions to human motion analysis and deepfake technology for creative use and responsible safeguarding".
