= Nicholas Navin =

American biologist

Nicholas Navin is an American biologist, recognised as the Grady Saunders Distinguished Professor at the University of Texas MD Anderson Cancer Center. Navin's contributions in the field of DNA analysis pioneered advancements in the development of the first single cell sequencing methodologies.

Navin has held leadership positions as the Director of the CPRIT Single Cell Genomics Center and the co-director of the Advanced Genomic Technologies Core. He has also held a dual appointment in the university's Department of Genetics and Department of Bioinformatics. Additionally, Navin has served as a scientific advisor to the biotechnology company ZS Genetics.

His research interests span single cell sequencing, oncogenomics, bioinformatics and the genome evolution in cancer. Under the tutelage of Michael Wigler at the Cold Spring Harbor Laboratory, Navin helped to develop the first single-cell DNA sequencing technique known as single nucleus sequencing. This innovation significantly influenced the development of the field of single-cell genomics.

== Awards ==
2021 AACR Breakthrough in Basic Research Award

2021 AAAS Fellow

2020 Living Legend Award in Basic Research

2019 Finalist, Blavatnik Award in Life Sciences

2016 ACS Research Scholar

2016 Sabin Family Fellowship

2016 President's Achievement Award

2016 Faculty Scholar Award

2015 AAAS Wachtel Award

2014 Faculty Educator Award

2013 Wilson Stone Award

2013 T.C. Hsu Award

2012 Damon Runyon-Rachleff Innovation Award - Nadia's Gift Foundation

2010 Young Investigator Award, GT Magazine

2010 Abraham's Award

2009 T32 Fellowship NCI

2009 King & Miller Fellowship

2005 Lindsey-Goldberg Fellowship
