= Gene Yeo =

American biologist

- Born: Eugene W. Yeo; Singapore
- Education: University of Illinois at Urbana–Champaign; Massachusetts Institute of Technology; University of California, San Diego
- Known for: RNA biology, RNA-binding protein genomics (eCLIP), RNA-targeted CRISPR therapeutics
- Awards: Lee Kuan Yew Graduate Fellowship; Crick-Jacobs Junior Fellowship; Sloan Research Fellowship; RNA Society Early-Career Award; Blavatnik National Award (finalist); Xconomy “Big Idea” Award; Allen Distinguished Investigator; Elisa Izaurralde Award; Sydney Brenner Medal; Entrepreneurial Achievement Award
- Scientific career
- Fields: Molecular biology, Bioinformatics
- Workplaces: University of California, San Diego
- Doctoral advisor: Christopher Burge, Tomaso Poggio

Gene Yeo is a Singaporean molecular biologist primarily based in the US, computational biologist and entrepreneur. He is a Professor of Cellular and Molecular Medicine at the University of California, San Diego (UCSD), where his research focuses on RNA biology and post-transcriptional gene regulation. He is noted for developing high-throughput methods to map RNA–protein interactions, including the enhanced CLIP (eCLIP) technique, and for pioneering RNA-targeted therapeutic strategies.

== Early life and education ==
Gene Yeo was born in Singapore and later moved to the United States for his higher education. He completed dual undergraduate degrees in chemical engineering and economics at the University of Illinois at Urbana–Champaign. He was awarded the prestigious Lee Kuan Yew Graduate Fellowship to pursue doctoral studies at the Massachusetts Institute of Technology (MIT), where he earned his Ph.D. under the guidance of Christopher Burge and Tomaso Poggio. Yeo was recruited as the first Crick-Jacobs Fellow at the Salk Institute working with Terry Sejnowski and Rusty Gage. Yeo also broadened his expertise by obtaining an M.B.A. from UC San Diego’s Rady School of Management.

== Academic career and research ==
In 2003, as a graduate student, Yeo co-authored the MaxENT splice site algorithm, which is one of the most utilized and cited splice site scorers.

In 2005, Yeo joined the Salk Institute as a Crick-Jacobs Fellow where he worked on RNA processing in stem and neuronal cells.

In 2008, Yeo joined the UCSD faculty as an assistant professor. His laboratory employs both computational and experimental approaches to investigate RNA biology, particularly the role of RNA-binding proteins (RBPs) in regulating RNA splicing, transport, translation, and degradation.

In 2024, Yeo received the Sanford Stem Cell Institute Endowed Chair and is currently Professor of Cellular and Molecular Medicine. He also currently serves as the founding Director for UCSD’s Center for RNA Technologies and Therapeutics, the founding Chief Scientist for Sanford Laboratories for Innovative Medicine, the founding Director of the Sanford Stem Cell Institute Innovation Center, Scientific Director and Chair of the Steering Committee of Sanford Consortium for Regenerative Medicine in La Jolla, a founding member of the Institute for Genomic Medicine and member of the Moores Cancer Center.

One of Yeo's contributions to the field is the development of the enhanced CLIP (eCLIP) method, which allows for genome-wide identification of RBP binding sites on RNA molecules. This technique has significantly advanced the understanding of post-transcriptional gene regulation and has been widely adopted in RNA biology research. To facilitate biological interpretation of RBP interactomics data, Yeo’s lab also pioneered computational algorithms, such as CLIPper, SONAR, SKIPPER and MudSKIPPER.

Yeo’s work also extends to RNA-targeted therapeutics. His laboratory has explored the use of CRISPR-based tools to target RNA molecules, aiming to correct aberrant RNA processing events that contribute to diseases such as myotonic dystrophy and neurodegenerative disorders.

In February 2026, Yeo and his team published a major study in the journal ''Nature'' detailing a novel technology called Ribo-STAMP. This method allows researchers to map actual protein production across individual brain cells, offering new single-cell insights into the mechanisms behind neurological diseases like autism spectrum disorder.

== Entrepreneurial activities ==
Yeo co-founded Locana, Inc. (later rebranded as Locanabio), Enzerna Biosciences, Trotana Therapeutics, Eclipsebio, Orbital Therapeutics and Proteona.

== Honors and awards ==
- Lee Kuan Yew Graduate Fellowship (2000)
- Crick-Jacobs Junior Fellowship at the Salk Institute (2005–2008)
- Alfred P. Sloan Research Fellowship (2011)
- RNA Society Early-Career Award (2017)
- Blavatnik National Award for Young Scientists – Finalist (2018, 2019)
- Xconomy “Big Idea” Award (2019)
- Allen Distinguished Investigator (2020)
- Elisa Izaurralde Award (2021)
- Sydney Brenner Medal (2023)
- Entrepreneurial Achievement Award (2023)

== Selected publications ==
- "Expanded encyclopaedias of DNA elements in the human and mouse genomes" JE Moore, MJ Purcaro, HE Pratt, CB Epstein, N Shoresh, J Adrian, T Kawli, et al. Nature 583(7818): 699–710 (2020).
- "A model for neural development and treatment of Rett syndrome using human induced pluripotent stem cells" MCN Marchetto, C Carromeu, A Acab, D Yu, GW Yeo, Y Mu, G Chen, et al. Cell 143(4): 527–539 (2010).
- "Long pre-mRNA depletion and RNA missplicing contribute to neuronal vulnerability from loss of TDP-43" M Polymenidou, C Lagier-Tourenne, KR Hutt, SC Huelga, J Moran, et al. Nature Neuroscience 14(4): 459–468 (2011).
- "Robust transcriptome-wide discovery of RNA-binding protein binding sites with enhanced CLIP (eCLIP)" EL Van Nostrand, GA Pratt, AA Shishkin, C Gelboin-Burkhart, MY Fang, et al. Nature Methods 13(6): 508–514 (2016).
- "A large-scale binding and functional map of human RNA-binding proteins" EL Van Nostrand, P Freese, GA Pratt, X Wang, X Wei, R Xiao, SM Blue, et al. Nature 583(7818): 711–719 (2020).
