= Duan Xiangfeng =

Chinese researcher

Duan Xiangfeng is a Chinese researcher, chemist, inventor, material scientist, and professor at the University of California, Los Angeles. He is regarded as one of the most cited scientists.

In 2013, he received the Beilby Medal and Prize for his contributions to the field of material science.

== Education and career ==
Duan obtained a degree in chemistry from the University of Science and Technology of China in 1997. He received a master's and a doctorate degree in physical chemistry from Harvard University and the University of Cambridge in 1999 and 2002, respectively. His PhD advisor was Charles Lieber.

He joined the University of California in 2008 as a faculty member. In 2018, he was elected a fellow of the Royal Society of Chemistry. He is a fellow of the American Association for the Advancement of Science.

In 2016, he was Elsevier's most cited researcher in materials science, and in 2017, 2018 and 2022, he was one of Clarivate's Highly Cited Researchers in materials science.
