= Wenjun Zhang =

Chinese communications and electronic engineer

Wenjun Zhang from the Shanghai Jiao Tong University, Shanghai, China was named Fellow of the Institute of Electrical and Electronics Engineers (IEEE) in 2012 for contributions to digital television systems and standards.
