= National Institutes of Health Director's Pioneer Award =

Medicine award

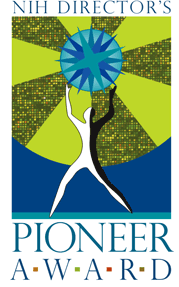

National Institutes of Health Director's Pioneer Award is a research initiative first announced in 2004 designed to support individual scientists' biomedical research. The focus is specifically on "pioneering" research that is highly innovative and has a potential to produce paradigm shifting results. The awards, made annually from the National Institutes of Health common fund, are each worth $500,000 per year, or $2,500,000 for five years.

== Recipients ==
=== 2004 ===
Source: NIH

- Larry Abbott
- George Q. Daley
- Homme W. Hellinga
- Joseph McCune
- Steven L. McKnight
- Rob Phillips
- Stephen R. Quake
- Chad Mirkin
- Xiaoliang Sunney Xie

=== 2005 ===
Source: NIH

- Vicki L. Chandler
- Hollis T. Cline
- Leda Cosmides
- Titia de Lange
- Karl Deisseroth
- Pehr A.B. Harbury
- Erich D. Jarvis
- Thomas A. Rando
- Derek J. Smith
- Giulio Tononi
- Clare M. Waterman-Storer
- Nathan Wolfe
- Junying Yuan

=== 2006 ===
Source: NIH

- Kwabena A. Boahen
- Arup K. Chakraborty
- Lila M. Gierasch
- Rebecca W. Heald
- Karla Kirkegaard
- Thomas J. Kodadek
- Cheng Chi Lee
- Evgeny A. Nudler
- Gary J. Pielak
- David A. Relman
- Rosalind A Segal
- James L. Sherley
- Younan Xia

=== 2007 ===
Source: NIH

- Lisa Feldman Barrett
- Peter Bearman
- Emery N. Brown
- Thomas R. Clandinin
- James J. Collins
- Margaret Gardel
- Takao K. Hensch
- Marshall S. Horwitz
- Rustem F. Ismagilov
- Frances E. Jensen
- Mark J. Schnitzer
- Gina Turrigiano

=== 2008 ===
Source: NIH

- James K. Chen, Ph.D., Stanford University
- Ricardo Dolmetsch, Ph.D., Stanford University
- James Eberwine, Ph.D., University of Pennsylvania
- Joshua M. Epstein, Ph.D., Brookings Institution
- Bruce A. Hay, Ph.D., California Institute of Technology
- Ann Hochschild, Ph.D., Harvard Medical School
- Charles M. Lieber, Ph.D., Harvard University
- Barry London, M.D., Ph.D., University of Pittsburgh
- Tom Maniatis, Ph.D., Harvard University
- Teri W. Odom, Ph.D., Northwestern University
- Hongkun Park, Ph.D., Harvard University
- Aviv Regev, Ph.D., Massachusetts Institute of Technology/Broad Institute
- Aravinthan D.T. Samuel, Ph.D., Harvard University
- Saeed Tavazoie, Ph.D., Princeton University
- Alice Y. Ting, Ph.D., Massachusetts Institute of Technology
- Alexander van Oudenaarden, Ph.D., Massachusetts Institute of Technology

=== 2009 ===
Source: NIH

- Ivor J. Benjamin, University of Utah School of Medicine
- Ajay Chawla, Stanford University
- Chang-Zheng Chen, Stanford University
- Hilde Cheroutre, La Jolla Institute for Immunology
- Markus W. Covert, Stanford University
- Joseph M. DeSimone, University of North Carolina at Chapel Hill/North Carolina State University
- Sylvia M. Evans, University of California, San Diego
- Joseph R. Fetcho, Cornell University
- Timothy E. Holy, Washington University School of Medicine
- Tannishtha Reya, Duke University
- Gene E. Robinson, University of Illinois at Urbana-Champaign
- Susan M. Rosenberg, Baylor College of Medicine
- Leona D. Samson, Massachusetts Institute of Technology
- Nirao M. Shah, University of California, San Francisco
- Krishna V. Shenoy, Stanford University
- Sarah A. Tishkoff, University of Pennsylvania
- Alexander J. Travis, Cornell University State College of Veterinary Medicine
- Jin Zhang, Johns Hopkins University School of Medicine

=== 2010 ===
Source: NIH

- Carlos F. Barbas III, Ph.D., Scripps Research
- Pamela J. Bjorkman, Ph.D., California Institute of Technology
- Valentin Dragoi, Ph.D., University of Texas, Health Science Center at Houston
- Stephen W. Fesik, Ph.D., Vanderbilt University School of Medicine
- Tamas L. Horvath, D.V.M., Ph.D., Yale School of Medicine
- J. Keith Joung, M.D., Ph.D., Massachusetts General Hospital / Harvard Medical School
- David Kleinfeld, Ph.D., University of California, San Diego
- Haifan Lin, Ph.D., Yale University
- Jun O. Liu, Ph.D., Johns Hopkins University School of Medicine
- Andres Villu Maricq, M.D., Ph.D., University of Utah
- Joseph H. Nadeau, Ph.D., Institute for Systems Biology
- Miguel A. L. Nicolelis, M.D., Ph.D., Duke University
- Lalita Ramakrishnan, M.D., Ph.D., University of Washington
- Lorna W. Role, Ph.D., Stony Brook University
- Michael L. Roukes, Ph.D., California Institute of Technology
- Ram Samudrala, Ph.D., University of Washington
- Bruce A. Yankner, M.D., Ph.D., Harvard Medical School

=== 2011 ===
Source: NIH

- Utpal Banerjee, Ph.D., University of California, Los Angeles
- Brenda L. Bass, Ph.D., University of Utah
- Jean Bennett, Ph.D., University of Pennsylvania
- William M. Clemons, Ph.D., California Institute of Technology
- Florian Engert, Ph.D., Harvard University
- Andrew P. Feinberg, M.D., M.P.H., Johns Hopkins University
- James E.K. Hildreth, M.D., Ph.D., University of California, Davis
- Tao Pan, Ph.D., University of Chicago
- Sharad Ramanathan, Ph.D., Harvard University
- David S. Schneider, Ph.D., Stanford University
- Thanos Siapas, Ph.D., California Institute of Technology
- Andreas S. Tolias, Ph.D., Baylor College of Medicine
- Mehmet Fatih Yanik, Ph.D., Massachusetts Institute of Technology

=== 2012 ===
Source: NIH

- Anne Brunet, Ph.D., Stanford University
- Edward Marcotte, Ph.D., University of Texas at Austin
- Hidde Ploegh, Ph.D., Whitehead Institute
- Christina Smolke, Ph.D., Stanford University
- Yi Tang, Ph.D., University of California
- Doris Ying Tsao, Ph.D., California Institute of Technology,
- Lihong V. Wang, Ph.D., Washington University in St. Louis
- Chao-Ting Wu, Ph.D., Harvard University Medical School
- Gary Yellen, Ph.D., Harvard University Medical School
- Feng Zhang, Ph.D., Broad Institute

=== 2013 ===
Source: NIH

- Amy Arnsten, Ph.D., Yale University, New Haven, CT
- Edward S. Boyden, Ph.D., Massachusetts Institute of Technology, Boston, MA
- Vadim N. Gladyshev, Ph.D., Brigham and Women's Hospital and Harvard Medical School, Boston, MA
- Baljit S. Khakh, Ph.D., University of California Los Angeles, David Geffen School of Medicine, CA
- Michael Z. Lin, M.D., Ph.D., Stanford University, Stanford, CA
- Jay Shendure, M.D., Ph.D., University of Washington, Seattle, WA
- Natalia A. Trayanova, Ph.D., The Johns Hopkins University, Baltimore, MD
- Fan Wang, Ph.D., Duke University Medical Center, Durham, NC
- Leor S Weinberger, Ph.D., Gladstone Institutes and University of California, San Francisco, CA
- Xiaoliang Sunney Xie, Ph.D., Harvard University, Cambridge, MA
- Rafael Yuste, M.D., Ph.D., Columbia University, New York, NY
- Mark J Zylka, Ph.D., University of North Carolina, Chapel Hill, NC

=== 2014 ===
Source: NIH

- Jayakrishna Ambati, M.D., University of Kentucky
- Chenghua Gu, D.V.M., Ph.D., Harvard medical School
- Cato T. Laurencin, M.D., Ph.D., University of Connecticut
- Denise J. Montell, Ph.D., University of California Santa Barbara
- Carl D. Novina, M.D., Ph.D., Dana-Farber Cancer Institute
- Amy Palmer, Ph.D., University of Colorado
- Dana Pe'er, Ph.D., Columbia University
- Oliver Rando, M.D., Ph.D., University of Massachusetts Medical School
- Donna L. Spiegelman, Sc.D., Harvard School of Public Health
- Sean Wu, M.D., Ph.D., Stanford University

=== 2015 ===
Source: 2015 NIH

- Giovanni Bosco, Dartmouth Geisel School of Medicine
- Jeffery S. Cox, University of California San Francisco
- Matthew David Disney, The Scripps Research Institute
- Zemer Gitai, Princeton University
- Jonathon Howard, Yale University
- Craig Montell, University of California Santa Barbara
- Coleen T. Murphy, Princeton University
- Gwendalyn J. Randolph, Washington University School of Medicine
- Steven J. Schiff, The Pennsylvania State University
- Hao Wu, Boston Children’s Hospital and Harvard Medical School
- Tony Wyss-Coray, Stanford University School of Medicine and VA Palo Alto
- Ryohei Yasuda, Max Planck Florida Institute for Neuroscience
- Sheng Zhong, University of California San Diego

=== 2016 ===
Source: NIH

- Kristin Baldwin, The Scripps Research Institute
- Bradley Bernstein, Massachusetts General Hospital and Broad Institute
- Michael Fischbach, University of California, San Francisco
- Uri Hasson, Princeton University
- Juan Carlos Izpisua Belmonte, The Salk Institute for Biological Studies
- Nancy Kanwisher, Massachusetts Institute of Technology
- Stephen D. Liberles, Harvard Medical School
- Christine Mayr, Memorial Sloan Kettering Cancer Center
- Joshua D. Rabinowitz, Princeton University
- Meng Wang, Baylor College of Medicine
- Sing Sing Way, Cincinnati Children’s Hospital
- Seok-Hyun "Andy" Yun, Massachusetts General Hospital and Harvard Medical School

=== 2017 ===
Source: NIH

- Hongjie Dai, Stanford University
- Amit Etkin, Stanford University
- Howard A. Fine, Weill Cornell College of Medicine
- Charles M. Lieber, Harvard University
- Jeffrey D. Macklis, Harvard University
- Luciano A. Marraffini, Rockefeller University
- Alex Schier, Harvard University
- Ramin Shiekhattar, University of Miami
- David A. Sinclair, Harvard Medical School
- Justin L. Sonnenburg, Stanford University
- Kay M. Tye, MIT
- Feng Zhang, Broad Institute, MIT

=== 2018 ===
Source: NIH

- Janelle S. Ayres, Salk Institute
- Daniel A. Colón-Ramos, Yale University School of Medicine
- Christina Curtis, Stanford University School of Medicine
- Viviana Gradinaru, Caltech
- Jonathan Kipnis, University of Virginia School of Medicine
- Hyungbae Kwon, Max Planck Florida Institute for Neuroscience
- Michelle Monje, Stanford University
- Gabriel D. Victora, Rockefeller University
- Amy J. Wagers, Harvard Medical School
- Peng Yin, Harvard University

=== 2019 ===
Source: NIH

- Mark Andermann, Beth Israel Deaconess Medical Center, Harvard Medical School
- James Eberwine, University of Pennsylvania Perelman School of Medicine
- Jennifer H. Elisseeff, Johns Hopkins University
- Valentina Greco, Yale University
- Christophe Herman, Baylor College of Medicine
- Sun Hur, Boston Children’s Hospital
- Rob Knight, University of California San Diego
- Jin Hyung Lee, Stanford University
- Marina R. Picciotto, Yale University
- Hidde Ploegh, Boston Children's Hospital, Harvard Medical School
- Simon Scheuring, Weill Cornell Medicine

=== 2020 ===
Source: NIH

- Annelise E. Barron, Stanford University, Schools of Medicine and of Engineering
- Kathleen Collins, University of California at Berkeley
- Christopher D. Harvey, Harvard Medical School
- Peter S. Kim, Stanford University
- Brian Litt, University of Pennsylvania
- Shu-Bing Qian, Cornell University
- Susan M. Rosenberg, Baylor College of Medicine
- John Schoggins, University of Texas Southwestern Medical Center
- David Veesler, University of Washington School of Medicine
- Magdalena Zernicka-Goetz, California Institute of Technology and University of Cambridge

=== 2021 ===
Source: NIH

- Polina O. Anikeeva, Massachusetts Institute of Technology
- Patricia Louise Clark, University of Notre Dame
- Rui M. Costa, Columbia University Health Sciences
- Michaela Ulrike Gack, Cleveland Clinic Lerner COM-CWRU
- Michael James Higley, Yale University
- Z. Josh Huang, Duke University
- Coleen Tara Murphy, Princeton University
- Jennifer Elizabeth Phillips-Cremins, University of Pennsylvania
- Linda J. Richards, Washington University
- Mikhail Shapiro, California Institute of Technology

=== 2022 ===
Source: NIH

- Long Cai, California Institute of Technology
- Kafui Dzirasa, Duke University
- Yamuna Krishnan, University of Chicago
- Gabriel A. Kwong, Georgia Institute of Technology
- Celeste M. Nelson, Princeton University
- Amanda E. Randles, Duke University
- Sheri Rose, Stanford University
- Sara Sawyer, University of Colorado

=== 2023 ===
Source: NIH

- Polly Morrell Fordyce, Stanford University
- William James Greenleaf, Stanford University
- Mande N Holford, Hunter College
- Kevin B. Johnson, University of Pennsylvania
- Lei Stanley Qi, Stanford University
- Fan Wang, Massachusetts Institute of Technology
- Ilana Witten, Princeton University
- Tania Reis, University of Colorado, Denver

=== 2024 ===
Source: NIH

- Nicola J Allen, Salk Institute for Biological Studies
- Hong Chen, Washington University
- Zemer Gitai, Princeton University
- Adam Kepecs, Washington University
- Nuo LI, Duke University
- Ahizechukwu Eke, Johns Hopkins University
- Silvia Mangia, University of Minnesota
- Denise J. Montell, University of California Santa Barbara
- Ken A. Paller, Northwestern University

== See also ==
- List of medicine awards
