= Junhyong Kim =

American biologist

Junhyong Kim is the Edmund J. and Louise W. Kahn Term Endowed Professor of Biology at the University of Pennsylvania and the author of over eighty published scientific papers.

== Career ==
Kim specializes in computational biology, genomics, and evolutionary biology. Originally from South Korea, he received his undergraduate degree in Microbiology at Seoul National University. During his undergraduate years, he became strongly interested in computer science and programming. He developed a program to fold tRNA sequences published in the Korean Journal of Biochemistry. This paper is now known as the first computational biology paper published in Korea. He received his PhD in Ecology and Evolution at Stony Brook University in 1992 under the supervision of Lev Ginzburg and Dan Dykhuizen. His dissertation was entitled "Factors influencing the growth of populations and their spatial distribution." His post-doctoral research was with Margaret Kidwell at the University of Arizona working on molecular evolution of Drosophila species. In 1994, he became an assistant professor in the Department of Biology at Yale University and was promoted to a tenured position in 2000. In 2002 he moved to the University of Pennsylvania where he is currently the Edmund J. and Louise Kahn Term Endowed Professor in Biology, an adjunct professor of computer science, and the Co-Director of the Penn Genome Frontiers Institute. He has been on the Steering Committee and the Conference Chair for Workshop on Algorithms in Bioinformatics; program chair and program committee for Intelligent Systems for Molecular Biology; and he is the longest running Associate Editor for IEEE/ACM Transactions on Computational Biology and Bioinformatics. Junhyong Kim's honors include the Sloan Foundation Young Investigator Award, Yale Faculty Award, Visiting Fellow at the Newton Institute (Cambridge University) and IHES (France), Ellison Medical Foundation Senior Scholar in Aging, and a Guggenheim Fellowship.

Kim has worked on a diverse set of research areas. His early works concentrated on mathematical phylogenetics, which started during his graduate school with Drs. Robert R. Sokal and F. James Rohlf who pioneered computational methods in evolutionary tree estimation. Among his works in this area, Junhyong Kim introduced the use of algebraic geometric techniques in phylogenetic estimation. In 1999, working with John Carlson at Yale, he developed a novel algorithm for computationally identifying G Protein-Coupled Receptors (GPCR) without using primary sequence homology, which led to the cloning of olfactory receptors in insects. After his move to Penn, his research has concentrated on comparative functional genomics, especially gene expression and RNA biology in two model systems. In one area, he is working with budding yeast to understand the mechanisms and evolution of timing control for gene expression. In the other area, he is working with James Eberwine to understand the RNA biology of mammalian neurons and the evolution of individual cell characteristics. With Dr. Eberwine he helped develop a novel method for using direct RNA transfer to reprogram mammalian cells and helped decipher the mechanisms of RNA localization in neurons. More recently, the Kim and Eberwine labs have been working together to understand transcriptome variability in single cells and how the variation relates to dysfunction of cells. Drs. Kim and Eberwine are currently directing a new 5-year project with a grant from the National Institutes of Health.
