= Amy Wagers =

American molecular biologist

- Education: Johns Hopkins University; Northwestern University (BA, PhD); Stanford University
- Known for: stem cell transplantation experiments
- Scientific career
- Fields: stem cell and regenerative biology, aging biology
- Institutions: Harvard Medical School
- Website: hscrb.harvard.edu/labs/wagers-lab/

Amy J. Wagers is the Forst Family Professor of Stem Cell and Regenerative Biology at Harvard University and Harvard Medical School, an investigator in islet cell and regenerative biology at the Joslin Diabetes Center, and principal faculty of the Harvard Stem Cell Institute. She is co-chair of the Department of Stem Cells and Regenerative Biology at Harvard Medical School.

== Education and research ==
Wager started her education at Johns Hopkins University and after transferring received her B.A. in Biological Sciences and her Ph.D. in Immunology and Microbial Pathogenesis from Northwestern University in 1999. She completed her postdoctoral fellowship in the laboratory of Dr. Irving Weissman at Stanford University School of Medicine.

Wagers researches intrinsic and extrinsic regulators of stem cell function and how stem cells impact tissue regeneration and aging. She has demonstrated that transplantation of satellite cells into injured, diseased, or aged muscle can lead to cell engraftment, in some cases restoring muscle function. She has also identified novel regulators (such as EGR1) of stem cell trafficking and stem cell number in bone marrow and during immune responses, and identified blood-borne proteins, such as GDF11, that in mice can reverse some of the pathological changes that occur in aging tissues. She co-founded a company based on this work, Elevian in 2018 that aims to apply GDF11 to stroke and other conditions. There are other data, however, that indicate that GDF11 functions to inhibit muscle regeneration

Two publications involving work by a postdoctoral researcher in the Wagers lab in 2008 were retracted by their other authors, one from Nature (2010) and one from Blood (August 2008). The researcher was dismissed from the lab and later sanctioned by the U.S. Government's Office of Research Integrity (ORI), part of the Department of Health and Human Services.

In 2018, Harvard Medical School announced that Wagers had accepted the position of co-chair of the Department of Stem Cells and Regenerative Biology, co-leading the Department with Chair Paola Arlotta.

== Awards ==
- 2018: NIH Director’s Pioneer Award
- 2012: Forst Family Professor of Stem Cell and Regenerative Biology
- 2007: Beckman Young Investigators Award
- 2004: Smith Family New Investigator Award
- 2003: Burroughs Wellcome Fund Career Award in the Biomedical Sciences
