= Fan Wang =

Fan Wang may refer to:

- Wang Fan (beach volleyball) (born 1994), Chinese beach volleyball player
- Wang Fan (footballer) (born 1987), Chinese footballer
- Fann Woon Fong (born 1971), Singaporean actress, singer and model
- Fan Wang (neuroscientist), Chinese-American neuroscientist
- Wang Fan (228–266), Chinese astronomer, mathematician, politician, and writer
