= Stephen Fesik =

American medicinal chemist, structural biologist, and chemical biologist

- Born: 1953 (age 72–73)
- Education: College of the Holy Cross (BA); University of Connecticut (PhD)
- Scientific career
- Fields: Medicinal chemistry Structural biology
- Workplaces: Vanderbilt University
- Doctoral advisor: Alexandros Makriyannis

Stephen William Fesik (born 1953) is an American medicinal chemist and structural biologist known for his research on fragment-based lead discovery. He is a triple professor of biochemistry, a professor of pharmacology, a professor of chemistry, and the Orrin H. Ingram II Chair in Cancer Research and the Tadashi Inagami Chair in Biochemistry at Vanderbilt University.

== Early life and education ==
Fesik was raised in Lincoln, Rhode Island. His father was an accountant. He graduated from the College of the Holy Cross in Worcester, Massachusetts, with a Bachelor of Arts in chemistry and pre-medical studies in 1975. He then earned his Ph.D. in medicinal chemistry from the University of Connecticut in 1981, under the supervision of biochemist Alexandros Makriyannis.

== Early career ==
After receiving his doctorate, Fesik was a postdoctoral researcher in molecular biophysics and biochemistry at the Yale School of Medicine from 1981 to 1983. He joined Abbott Laboratories in 1983 as a research chemist before being named divisional vice president of its cancer research in 2000. At Abbott, he developed nuclear magnetic resonance (NMR) methods, determined the three-dimensional structures of proteins and protein–ligand complexes, and developed an NMR-based approach to drug discovery known as structure–activity relationships by NMR (SAR by NMR).

In 1996, Fesik and colleagues described SAR by NMR in Science, using NMR spectroscopy to identify small organic molecules that bound to neighboring sites on a target protein and then linking the molecules to produce higher-affinity ligands. That same year, Fesik was among the Abbott researchers who reported the X-ray crystallographic and NMR solution structures of the anti-apoptotic protein Bcl-xL in Nature. In 2003, Abbott named him a Distinguished Research Fellow in its Volwiler Society, the company's highest scientific career level.

Fesik was a co-author of a 2005 Nature study reporting the discovery of ABT-737, a small-molecule inhibitor of the anti-apoptotic proteins Bcl-2, Bcl-xL and Bcl-w that had been developed through NMR-based screening, parallel synthesis and structure-based design. As divisional vice president of cancer research from 2000 to 2009, he oversaw an Abbott program that developed a pipeline of anticancer compounds.

== Academic career ==
=== Vanderbilt University ===
Fesik left Abbott in May 2009 to become a professor of chemistry at the Vanderbilt University School of Medicine and to lead cancer drug-discovery initiatives for the Vanderbilt Institute of Chemical Biology and the Vanderbilt-Ingram Cancer Center. In May 2010, Vanderbilt named Fesik the inaugural holder of the Orrin H. Ingram II Chair in Cancer Research. Later that year, he received an NIH Director's Pioneer Award for a research project titled "Expanding the Druggable Genome". He was also elected a fellow of the American Association for the Advancement of Science in 2010 for contributions applying structural biology to medicinal chemistry and drug discovery.

In 2012, the American Association for Cancer Research awarded Fesik its Award for Outstanding Achievement in Chemistry in Cancer Research. In 2015, the Lustgarten Foundation awarded him a $1.5 million Research Investigator Grant for work directed at discovering small-molecule drugs for pancreatic cancer. Vanderbilt's Center for Cancer Drug Discovery, which originated in 2009 and later became a dedicated center in the National Cancer Institute's Chemical Biology Consortium, has been co-directed by Fesik and chemist Gary Sulikowski.

At Vanderbilt, Fesik holds a triple professorship in biochemistry, pharmacology and chemistry, as well as the Orrin H. Ingram II Chair in Cancer Research and the Tadashi Inagami Chair in Biochemistry.

== Research ==
Fesik's research has focused on fragment-based drug discovery, structure-based drug design, medicinal chemistry, and the application of NMR spectroscopy to drug discovery. His work has included the development of small-molecule inhibitors targeting protein–protein interactions and proteins involved in cancer biology, including members of the BCL-2 family, MCL-1, KRAS, MYC, and WDR5. He is known for developing the Structure–Activity Relationships by Nuclear Magnetic Resonance (SAR by NMR) methodology, an approach used in fragment-based drug discovery.

SAR by NMR has been described in the scientific literature as one of the methods that established fragment-based drug discovery as a strategy in pharmaceutical research.

== Honors and awards ==
- NIH Director's Pioneer Award (2010).
- AACR Award for Outstanding Achievement in Chemistry in Cancer Research (2012).
- Elected Fellow of the American Association for the Advancement of Science (AAAS).
- SBS Technology Innovation Award.

== Selected publications ==
- Shuker, Steven B.; Hajduk, Philip J.; Meadows, Raymond P.; Fesik, Stephen W. (1996). "Discovering high-affinity ligands for proteins: SAR by NMR". Science. 274 (5292): 1531–1534. doi:10.1126/science.274.5292.1531. PMID 8929414.
- Oltersdorf, Thomas; et al. (2005). "An inhibitor of Bcl-2 family proteins induces regression of solid tumors". Nature. 435 (7042): 677–681. doi:10.1038/nature03579. PMID 15902208.
- Fesik, Stephen W. (2025). "Drugging Challenging Cancer Targets using Fragment-Based Methods". Chemical Reviews. 125 (7): 3586–3594. doi:10.1021/acs.chemrev.4c00987.
