= Paller =

Paller is a surname. Notable people with the surname include:

- Alan Paller (1945–2021), American cybersecurity expert
- Ken A. Paller, American neuroscientist and professor of psychology
- Robb Paller (born 1993), American-Israeli baseballer
- Tatjana Paller (born 1995), German track cyclist
