= Makriyannis =

Makriyannis is a Greek surname. Notable people with the surname include:

- Alexandros Makriyannis (born 1939), American medical researcher
- Yannis Makriyannis (1797–1864), Greek merchant, military author, politician, and author
