= Susan M. Rosenberg =

Cancer research scientist

Susan M. Rosenberg is a cancer research scientist and the Ben F. Love Chair in Cancer Research at Baylor College of Medicine. Her research focuses on the processes of DNA mutations, damage, and repair.

== Education ==
Rosenberg earned a bachelor's degree from State University of New York at Potsdam in 1980 and a PhD from the University of Oregon in 1986. She then did postdoctoral fellowships at University of Paris VII, University of Utah School of Medicine and the National Cancer Institute.

== Career ==
Rosenberg is current a professor in the Department of Molecular and Human Genetics and the Department of Biochemistry and Molecular Biology at Baylor College of Medicine in Houston, Texas.

In recognition of her research, Rosenberg has been inducted into the American Association for the Advancement of Science and the American Academy of Microbiology. She also twice received the NIH Director’s Pioneer Award in 2009 and 2020 and twice received the Michael E. DeBakey Excellence in Research Award in 2001 and 2014.

She serves on the editorial board of DNA Repair (journal).
