= Fan Wang (neuroscientist) =

Chinese-American neuroscientist

- Education: Columbia University
- Scientific career
- Fields: Sensory neuroscience
- Institutions: Duke University School of Medicine; Massachusetts Institute of Technology
- Thesis: Molecular genetic analysis of the olfactory sensory projections (1998)
- Doctoral advisor: Richard Axel
- Other academic advisors: Marc Tessier-Lavigne

Fan Wang is a neuroscientist and professor in the MIT Department of Brain and Cognitive Sciences. She is an investigator at the McGovern Institute for Brain Research. Wang is known for her work identifying neural circuits underlying touch, pain, and anesthesia; and the development of a technique for capturing activated neuronal ensembles (CANE) to label and manipulate neurons activated by stimuli or behavioral paradigms.

== Education and career ==
Wang received her PhD in 1998 from Columbia University. Her thesis, titled Molecular genetic analysis of the olfactory sensory projections, was advised by Richard Axel. She did postdoctoral research with Marc Tessier-Lavigne at Stanford University before joining the faculty at Duke University School of Medicine in 2003 with appointments in neurobiology and cell biology. She was promoted to associate professor in 2013 and full professor in 2017. Wang was named Morris N. Broad Distinguished Professor of Neurobiology in 2018. In 2021, Wang joined the faculty at MIT as a professor in the department of brain and cognitive sciences and investigator at the McGovern Institute for Brain Research, maintaining an affiliation with the Duke Regeneration Center and adjunct professorship in neurobiology at Duke.

== Research ==
The Wang lab uses molecular, genetic, and electrophysiological methods to understand how neural circuits enable or suppress touch, pain, and other senses or behaviors.

Towards the creation of new tools for neuroscience, the Wang lab developed a technique for Capturing Activated Neuronal Ensembles (CANE) by engineering mice to transiently co-express the TVA receptor when the immediate early gene c-Fos is expressed in response to neuronal activity, thereby enabling EnvA-pseudotyped viruses to specifically infect activated cells and drive stable expression of a desired transgene. This technique has been used to identify circuits involved in social vocalization, affective pain, sleep, anesthesia, and social fear.

Using CANE, the Wang lab has identified anesthesia-activated neurons (AANs) whose activity promotes slow-wave sleep and extends general anesthesia. Wang has continued to investigate the neural correlates of consciousness in collaboration with Kafui Dzirasa.

In 2020, the Wang lab identified a key ensemble of mouse GABAergic neurons in the central nucleus of the amygdala (CeA_{GA}) that are activated by the general anesthesia drugs isoflurane and ketamine. Optogenetic activation of these neurons suppressed pain-elicited behaviors, whereas inhibition enhanced aversion and blocked the analgesic effect of ketamine. CeA_{GA} neurons directly project to many brain regions associated with affective pain processing such as the prefrontal cortex (pre-limbic and cingulate), nucleus accumbens, dorsal medial striatum, insular cortex, bed nucleus of stria terminalis, basolateral amygdala, subthalamus, thalamic reticular nucleus, intralaminar nuclei of thalamus, parabrachial nuclei, and periaqueductal gray. These findings in mice may lay the foundation for future pain therapeutics in humans.

The Wang lab also studies how neuronal circuits contribute to the complex phenomenon of addiction, in which the drug-craving brain state may be analogous to that underlying affective pain. Her lab has mapped circuits that are activated or inhibited by morphine and is testing whether reactivating inhibited neurons can reduce drug-seeking behavior.

== Awards and honors ==
- 2024 Elected Member, National Academy of Medicine
- 2020 Elected Member, American Academy of Arts & Sciences
- 2016 Scientific Innovations Award, Brain Research Foundation
- 2016 Keck Foundation Award, in collaboration with Kafui Dzirasa
- 2014 Elected Fellow, Section on Neuroscience, American Association for the Advancement of Science
- 2013 National Institutes of Health Director's Pioneer Award
- 2004 Sloan Research Fellowship, Alfred P. Sloan Foundation
