= Y. Erin Chen =

American microbiologist/immunologist

- Education: University of Chicago Harvard–MIT Program in Health Sciences and Technology Stanford University
- Awards: Howard Hughes Medical Institute Hanna H. Gray Fellow
- Scientific career
- Fields: microbiology, immunology
- Thesis: Phosphorylation-based control of cellular asymmetry and the cell cycle in Caulobacter crescentus
- Doctoral advisor: Michael Laub
- Other academic advisors: Michael Fishbach
- Website: https://www.yeclab.org/

(Yiyin) Erin Chen is an American immunologist, microbiologist, and dermatologist. She is currently an Assistant Professor of Biology at the Massachusetts Institute of Technology (MIT), a Core Institute Member at the Broad Institute of MIT and Harvard, and an attending dermatologist at Massachusetts General Hospital. She is recognized for her work on developing topical microbial vaccines to treat internal tumors.

== Early life and education ==
Chen earned her Bachelor of Arts degree in Biology from the University of Chicago in 2006. She then completed her MD-PhD training through the Harvard-MIT Health Sciences and Technology program, receiving her PhD from MIT in 2011 and her MD from Harvard Medical School in 2013.

== Career and research ==
After completing her medical training, Chen pursued postdoctoral research as a Howard Hughes Medical Institute Hanna Gray Fellow at Stanford University in the laboratory of Michael Fischbach. During this time, she also worked as an attending dermatologist at the University of California San Francisco and the San Francisco VA Medical Center. In January 2023, Chen joined MIT as an Assistant Professor of Biology and became a Core Institute Member at the Broad Institute.

Chen's lab focuses on the interactions between the skin microbiome and the human immune system. They employs microbial genetics, immunological approaches, and mouse models to study how commensal skin bacteria communicate with and educate the immune system. A key area of Chen's work involves developing genetic engineering methods for commensal skin bacteria. In 2023, Chen and colleagues demonstrated that engineered skin bacteria could induce antitumor T cell responses against melanoma in mice.
