= Leona D. Samson =

Biological engineer (born 1952)

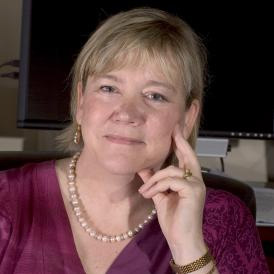
- Born: August 29, 1952 (age 74)
- Education: University of Aberdeen, University College London
- Known for: Biochemistry, genetics, systems biology
- Spouse: David Hunter
- Children: 1
- Scientific career
- Fields: Biological engineering, biology Toxicology
- Workplaces: Harvard School of Public Health, Massachusetts Institute of Technology

Leona D. Samson is the Uncas and Helen Whitaker Professor and American Cancer Society Research Professor of Biological Engineering at the Massachusetts Institute of Technology, where she served as the director of the Center for Environmental Health Sciences from 2001 to 2012. Before her professorship at MIT, she held a professorship at the Harvard School of Public Health. She is on the editorial board of the journal DNA Repair. Her research interests focus on "methods for measuring DNA repair capacity (DRC) in human cells", research the National Institute of Health recognized as pioneering in her field, for which the NIH granted her the National Institutes of Health Director's Pioneer Award.

== Education and career ==
Samson received her Bachelor of Science degree in biochemistry from the University of Aberdeen in 1974. She then went on to complete her PhD in Molecular Biology from the University College London in 1978. She did five years of postdoctoral research at UCSF and UC Berkeley before joining the faculty at the Harvard School of Public Health in 1983. In 2001 MIT recruited her and she now holds two endowed professorships at MIT, one being the Uncas and Helen Whitaker Professor and the other is the American Cancer Society Research Professor in the departments of Biological Engineering and Biology. She was also an adjunct professor of toxicology at Harvard University. In 2001 she became the director of the Center for Environmental Health Sciences at MIT. She leads a lab at MIT focusing on researching DNA alkylation repair and developing methods by which one can measure DNA repair capacity. She was recognized by the NIH for her work in 2009, when she was awarded the National Institutes of Health Director's Pioneer Award, a funded grant awarded to "[support] individual scientists of exceptional creativity, who propose pioneering – and possibly transforming approaches – to major challenges in biomedical and behavioral research." Since 2007 she has been a fellow of the American Association for the Advancement of Science, "the world's largest general scientific society". She has also been elected Fellow of the National Academy of Medicine and the American Academy of Arts and Sciences.

== Research area ==
Samson specializes in bacterial, yeast, mouse and human DNA repair. Specifically, her lab's goal is to "understand the biology, the biochemistry, and the genetics of numerous DNA repair pathways that act upon DNA alkylation damage." This is applicable to human cancer research, because alkylating agents are used extensively in chemotherapy and other cancer treatments. This work is also applicable to environmental exposures to alkylating agents in the food we eat, the fluids we drink and the air we breath. She is researching "how eukaryotic cells respond to alkylating agents." Alkylating agents are drugs which work by replacing a hydrogen with an alkyl group, with the result being DNA damage. Alkylating agents inhibit replication, transcription and protein synthesis and thus damage rapidly dividing cells, among which cancer cells are primarily affected because they divide so rapidly. She measures cells' ability to resist the toxicity caused by DNA-damaging agents, like alkylating agents.

== Publications ==
Most of Samson's contemporary publications are written about alkylating agents in particular or about DNA repair pathways. One of her most-cited articles, "Global response of Saccharomyces cerevisiae to an alkylating agent", measures the gene transcript levels of a yeast named Saccharomyces cerevisiae. Another highly cited article, also about Saccharomyces cerevisiae, was published in 2000 and entitled "Regulatory Networks Revealed by Transcriptional Profiling of Damaged Saccharomyces cerevisiae Cells: Rpn4 Links Base Excision Repair with Proteasomes." This paper finds that the transcription and repair of certain genes in the yeast are regulated by the proteasome-associated protein Rpn4. Samson is also an associate editor of the journal DNA Repair, a "leading scientific journal that publishes research on cellular responses to DNA damage."

== Awards ==
- American Cancer Society Scholar Award (1985)
- American Cancer Society Faculty Research Award (1987)
- Burroughs Wellcome Toxicology Scholar Award (1993)
- AACR Women in Cancer Research Award (2000)
- Environmental Mutagen Society Annual Award for Research Excellence (2001)
- American Cancer Society Research Professor (2001)
- Elected member of the National Academy of Medicine (NAM) (2003)
- Elected President of the Environmental Mutagen Society (2004)
- Elected Fellow of the American Association for the Advancement of Science (AAAS) (2007)
- NIH Director's Pioneer Award (2009)
- Senior Scholar Award from the Ellison Medical Foundation (2012)
- Fellow of the Radcliffe Institute for Advanced Study (2014–15)
- Elected Fellow of the American Academy of Arts and Sciences (2021)

== Personal life ==
Samson married David Hunter, the dean for academic affairs and current acting dean of the faculty at the Harvard School of Public Health, on August 5, 1989. They adopted their daughter, Claire, in 1994.
