= Z. Josh Huang =

Chinese-American neuroscientist

- Born: Zuoshi Josh Huang
- Education: Fudan University; Arizona State University; Brandeis University
- Known for: Genetic circuit mapping; GABAergic neuron diversity; CellREADR; Cortical cell-type taxonomy
- Awards: NIH Director's Pioneer Award; Fellow of the American Academy of Arts and Sciences
- Scientific career
- Fields: Neuroscience
- Workplaces: Duke University School of Medicine

Zuoshi Josh Huang (Chinese: 黄佐实) is a Chinese-American neuroscientist known for his contributions to the genetic dissection of neural circuitry in the cerebral cortex through systematic mapping of its cellular components. He is Distinguished Professor of Neuroscience in the Department of Neurobiology and Biomedical Engineering at the Duke University School of Medicine. Huang is an elected member of the American Academy of Arts and Sciences.

== Early life and education ==
Huang received a B.S. in biology from Fudan University in Shanghai in 1985. He completed an M.S. in zoology at Arizona State University in 1989. He then earned a Ph.D. in molecular and cell biology from Brandeis University in 1995, working in the laboratory of Michael Rosbash, where he studied the molecular mechanisms of the circadian clock in fruit flies.

From 1995 to 1999, he was a postdoctoral fellow in the laboratory of Susumu Tonegawa at the Massachusetts Institute of Technology, where he studied the molecular mechanisms of experience-dependent plasticity and critical periods in the visual cortex.

== Career ==
Huang joined Cold Spring Harbor Laboratory (CSHL) in 2000 as an assistant professor. He became associate professor in 2004 and was appointed the Charles and Marie Robertson Professor of Neuroscience in 2010. In 2020, he joined Duke University as Professor in the Department of Neurobiology, and in 2022 he was named Duke School of Medicine Distinguished Professor in Neuroscience.

== Awards and honors ==
- Pew Scholar Award (2002)
- McKnight Scholar Award in Neuroscience, McKnight Foundation (2004–2007)
- Simons Investigator, Simons Foundation Autism Research Initiative (2007–2017)
- Distinguished Investigator Award, NARSAD (2011)
- Special Lecture, Society for Neuroscience (2015)
- National Institutes of Health Director's Pioneer Award (2021)
- Elected Member of the American Academy of Arts and Sciences (2022)
