= Amy Arnsten =

American neuroscientist

Amy F.T. Arnsten
- Education: Brown University; UC San Diego
- Scientific career
- Workplaces: Yale University

Amy F.T. Arnsten is an American neuroscientist. She is the Albert E. Kent Professor of Neuroscience and Professor of Psychology as well as a member of the Kavli Institute of Neuroscience at Yale University.

== Research ==
Arnsten studies the unique molecular mechanisms that regulate the higher cortical circuits that govern cognition, and the alterations that can lead to cognitive disorders. Much of her work has focused on the prefrontal cortex, a recently evolved brain region that generates working memory, abstract thought, and top down control, including the executive functions. Arnsten's lab discovered a process termed Dynamic Network Connectivity, whereby neuromodulators can open or close potassium channels on prefrontal cortical dendritic spines to rapidly alter synaptic connectivity, and coordinate arousal state with cognitive state. She was the first to discover how exposure to an acute, uncontrollable stress causes the prefrontal cortex to go "off-line", reviewed in, and how dysregulation of stress signaling pathways with advancing age confers vulnerability to tau pathology, e.g. in Alzheimer's disease, reviewed in. She also discovered mechanisms to strengthen prefrontal connectivity, including stimulation of alpha-2A-adrenoceptors on spine. Her work has identified mechanisms to protect and strengthen prefrontal cortex, leading to the successful translation of two treatments currently in clinical use: the alpha-2A-adrenoceptor agonist, guanfacine for disorders of the prefrontal cortex such as ADHD, autism and delirium, and prazosin for treating PTSD.

== Education ==
Arnsten grew up in Maplewood, New Jersey, and graduated from Columbia High School in 1972. She received a bachelor's degree in neuroscience from Brown University in 1976, where she was the first to create the neuroscience major, and a PhD in neuroscience from UC San Diego in 1981. She completed postdoctoral research at Cambridge University with Susan Iversen and at Yale University with Patricia Goldman-Rakic.

== Recognition ==
In 2008, Arnsten received the Distinguished Investigator Award from the National Alliance for Research on Schizophrenia and Depression, to further her research on the neurobiology of mental illness. In 2013, she was given the National Institutes of Health Director's Pioneer Award in recognition of her groundbreaking research. In 2015, she won the Goldman-Rakic Prize for Outstanding Achievement in Cognitive Neuroscience from the Brain and Behavior Research Foundation.

Arnsten was elected to the National Institute of Medicine in 2017. She studies the molecular mechanisms underlying cognition and cognitive disorders, and the ways in which the pre-frontal cortex responds to stress. Her research has led to two treatments currently in use: guanfacine for disorders such as ADHD and autism, and prazosin for treating PTSD.

Arnsten was featured in a 2019 HBO documentary by Sanjay Gupta and Marc Levin called One Nation Under Stress. Her research was also the focus of a New York Times article on why we often "freeze" during threat.
