= Kevin B. Johnson =

American physician and biomedical informatician

Kevin B. Johnson is an American physician and biomedical informatician. He is the David L. Cohen University Professor of Biomedical Informatics, Computer and Information Science, Pediatrics, and Science Communication at the University of Pennsylvania and Vice President for Applied Informatics in the University of Pennsylvania Health System. He previously served as chair of the Department of Biomedical Informatics and as chief informatics officer at Vanderbilt University Medical Center.

Johnson's work has addressed electronic prescribing, clinical documentation, health information exchange, and, more recently, artificial-intelligence tools for ambulatory care. He was elected to the National Academy of Medicine in 2010.

== Life and career ==
Johnson studied at Dickinson College and earned his medical degree at Johns Hopkins. He later completed graduate training in medical informatics at Stanford and held faculty appointments at Johns Hopkins before moving to Vanderbilt in 2002. In 2021, he joined the University of Pennsylvania.

In 2015, Johnson executive-produced the documentary No Matter Where, about the development and limits of health information exchange systems in the United States. In the 2020s, his research at Penn has included studies of ambient AI documentation tools and the development of outpatient-care research resources such as the Observer repository.

Johnson received a 2023 NIH Director's Pioneer Award for a project titled "Helping Doctors Doctor: Using AI to Automate Documentation and 'De-Autonomate' Health Care." He was elected to the AIMBE College of Fellows in 2022 and was inducted into the Johns Hopkins Society of Scholars in 2013. He has also served on the NIH Council of Councils.
