= Michael Fischbach =

American chemist, microbiologist, and geneticist

- Born: November 3, 1980
- Education: Harvard College; Harvard University
- Spouse: Elizabeth Sattely
- Awards: National Institutes of Health Director's Pioneer Award HHMI-Simons Faculty Scholars Award Chan Zuckerberg Biohub investigator
- Scientific career
- Workplaces: Stanford University
- Thesis: Nonribosomal peptide biosynthesis: Directed evolution of assembly line enzymes and characterization of post-assembly line tailoring (2007)
- Doctoral advisor: Christopher Walsh
- Notable students: Y. Erin Chen
- Website: fischbachgroup.org

Michael Andrew Fischbach (born November 3, 1980) is an American chemist, microbiologist, and geneticist. He is an associate professor of Bioengineering and ChEM-H Faculty Fellow at Stanford University and a Chan Zuckerberg Biohub Investigator.

== Education ==
Fischbach earned his A.B. in Biochemical Sciences from Harvard College in 2003. During that time (2000–2003), he worked in Jeffrey Settleman's lab at the Massachusetts General Hospital Cancer Center on the biochemistry of oncogenic mutants of the small GTPase Ras. In 2007, he earned his Ph.D. in Chemistry and Chemical Biology from Harvard University, working in Christopher T. Walsh's laboratory at Harvard Medical School on iron acquisition in bacterial pathogens and the biochemistry of natural product biosynthesis.

== Career ==
Fischbach was a junior fellow in the Department of Molecular Biology at Massachusetts General Hospital (2007–2009) before joining the faculty of the University of California, San Francisco in 2009. He moved to Stanford University as an associate professor in September 2017. As a Chan Zuckerberg Biohub Investigator, Fischbach is one of eight faculty members across Stanford, UCSF, and the University of California, Berkeley leading the CZ Biohub Microbiome Initiative, launched in 2018, with the goal of understanding how the microbiota can influence human health.

Fischbach is currently a member of the scientific advisory board of NGM Biopharmaceuticals and a co-founder of Revolution Medicines.

== Research ==
Fischbach's lab focuses on discovering and characterizing small molecules from microorganisms, with an emphasis on the human microbiome.

=== Small molecules from the human microbiota ===
In 2014, Fischbach and his laboratory published a survey of biosynthetic genes in the human microbiome, describing the ability of human-associated microbes to produce thiopeptide antibiotics. The Fischbach lab discovered that the gut commensal Bacteroides fragilis produces the immune modulatory sphingolipid alpha-galactosylceramide, showed that the production of neurotransmitters is common among commensal gut bacteria, and discovered the biosynthetic pathway for a common class of bile acids produced by gut bacteria.

=== Computational approaches to natural product discovery ===
Fischbach's lab developed an algorithm, ClusterFinder, that automates the process of identifying biosynthetic genes for small molecules in bacterial genome sequences. With Marnix Medema, he co-developed a second algorithm for identifying biosynthetic gene clusters, antiSMASH, with which ClusterFinder has been merged.

=== Engineered Bacteria Therapeutics ===
Fischbach's team has made significant strides in engineering commensal bacteria for therapeutic purposes. They transformed the ubiquitous skin bacterium Staphylococcus epidermidis into a topical vaccine platform. This approach generated potent, durable, and specific antibody responses in mice, potentially offering a new method for vaccine delivery. In 2023, his postdoc Erin Chen led an effort to engineer skin bacteria to induce antitumor T cell responses against melanoma, highlighting the potential of the skin microbiome in cancer immunotherapy.

== Personal life ==
Fischbach is married to Elizabeth Sattely, Associate Professor of Chemical Engineering at Stanford.
