= David Veesler =

- Born: 12/30/1981; Aix-en-Provence, France
- Education: Aix-Marseille University
- Known for: Structural studies of coronavirus spike proteins; pioneering work on coronavirus entry; development of SKYcovione vaccine and sotrovimab antibody; cryo-EM structures of emerging viruses
- Awards: NIH Director's Pioneer Award (2020); Burroughs Wellcome Fund Investigator in the Pathogenesis of Infectious Diseases (2018); Pew Scholar in Biomedical Sciences (2017)
- Scientific career
- Fields: Structural biology, Virology, Immunology, Protein design
- Workplaces: University of Washington
- Doctoral advisor: Christian Cambillau
- Website: www.veeslerlab.com

David Veesler (born 1981, Aix-en-Provence, France) is a French–American structural biologist and Professor of Biochemistry at the University of Washington, where he holds the Hans Neurath Endowed Chair, and an Investigator of the Howard Hughes Medical Institute. His research focuses on the structural and molecular mechanisms of virus entry and immune recognition, as well as on protein design to develop next-generation vaccines and therapeutics.

Veesler pioneered studies of coronavirus entry into cells and elucidated the architecture of coronavirus spike glycoproteins, providing the foundation for the development of COVID-19 vaccines and monoclonal antibody therapeutics. His laboratory carried out key work that led to the authorization of the monoclonal antibody therapy sotrovimab and the approval of the protein nanoparticle vaccine SKYcovione. He has received major honors, including the NIH Director's Pioneer Award and the Burroughs Wellcome Fund Investigator Award in the Pathogenesis of Infectious Diseases.

== Early life and education ==
Veesler was born in 1981 in Aix-en-Provence, France. He earned both his M.Sc. (2006) and Ph.D. (2011) in structural biology at Aix-Marseille University under the supervision of Christian Cambillau, where he studied the architecture and evolution of bacteriophages using hybrid structural methods. During his graduate training he was a visiting researcher in Andreas Plückthun's laboratory at the University of Zurich. He conducted postdoctoral research at The Scripps Research Institute in La Jolla, California, with Jack Johnson and Bridget Carragher as a Marie Curie International Fellow.

== Academic career ==
Veesler joined the faculty of the University of Washington in 2015 as an Assistant Professor in the Department of Biochemistry, becoming Associate Professor in 2020 and Professor in 2023. He was appointed an Investigator of the Howard Hughes Medical Institute in 2021 and named the Hans Neurath Endowed Chair in Biochemistry in 2023.

== Research and scientific contributions ==
=== Structural and functional studies of coronavirus spike glycoproteins ===
Veesler's group determined the first atomic-level structures of coronavirus spike glycoproteins in their prefusion and postfusion conformations using cryo-electron microscopy.

=== Coronavirus entry, cross-species transmission, and receptor usage ===
They identified ACE2 as the entry receptor for SARS-CoV-2 and determined its spike structure within weeks of the genome release, mapped receptor-binding sites for MERS-CoV, HCoV-OC43, and HCoV-HKU1, and demonstrated that close relatives of MERS-CoV in bats can also use ACE2 for cell entry.

=== Coronavirus immunity and therapeutic development ===
They identified an antigenic supersite targeted by all potent neutralizing antibodies specific for the SARS-CoV-2 spike NTD and showed that NTD antibodies exert selective pressure on variant emergence. Their work with Vir Biotechnology led to the isolation of the broadly neutralizing monoclonal antibody S309, which became the therapeutic sotrovimab. The laboratory also conducted preclinical studies demonstrating potent neutralization and protection in animal models, work that supported sotrovimab's global authorization.

=== Structure-guided vaccine design and protein engineering ===
His lab developed multivalent receptor-binding-domain (RBD) nanoparticle vaccines that elicit broad neutralizing responses against sarbecoviruses. One candidate, SKYcovione, co-developed with SK bioscience, was approved for human use after preclinical studies in the Veesler and King labs. The Veesler group applies computational protein design to create next-generation vaccines and miniprotein inhibitors.

=== Structural and functional studies of henipaviruses ===
Veesler's laboratory described the first and, to date, only atomic-resolution structure of the Nipah virus attachment glycoprotein and characterized the first antibodies recognizing the Nipah virus fusion glycoprotein. These studies provided a foundation for the structure-based design of vaccines and therapeutics against Nipah and Hendra viruses, which cause highly lethal encephalitic disease outbreaks.

== Awards and honors ==
- 2020 – NIH Director's Pioneer Award
- 2020 – Amgen Young Investigator Award
- 2018 – Burroughs Wellcome Fund Investigator in the Pathogenesis of Infectious Diseases
- 2017 – Pew Scholar in Biomedical Sciences
- 2017 – Young Investigator Outstanding Recognition – FEI (Thermo Fisher Scientific)
- 2013 – Microscopy & Microanalysis Presidential Scholar Award
- 2011 – Marie Curie International Outgoing Fellowship (FP7)
- 2006 – Ph.D. Fellowship, French Ministry of Higher Education and Research
