= Seok-Hyun "Andy" Yun =

South Korean physicist (born 1969)

Andy Yun
- 윤석현; 尹錫賢
- Born: Seok-Hyun Yun; December 29, 1969 (age 56); South Korea
- Known for: Pioneer of bio-laser
- Awards: NIH Director's Pioneer Award; 2016 MGH Research Scholar
- Scientific career
- Fields: Physics, Photonics, Biomedical Engineering, Photomedicine
- Workplaces: Harvard University; Massachusetts General Hospital
- Website: www.intelon.org

Seok-Hyun "Andy" Yun (Korean: 윤석현; Hanja: 尹錫賢; born December 29, 1969) is a scientist and technologist at Harvard University in Cambridge, Massachusetts. He was born and raised in South Korea and received his B.S. (1991), M.S., and Ph.D. (1997) in Physics from KAIST in Korea. His dissertation research in fiber optics led to a venture-funded startup in San Jose, CA, where he was a founding member and manager. He joined the Wellman Center for Photomedicine (Dermatology) at Massachusetts General Hospital and Harvard Medical School in 2003 and is as of January 2017 a Professor, MGH Research Scholar, and the Director of the Harvard-MIT Summer Institute for Biomedical Optics. He is a recipient of the 2016 NIH Director's Pioneer Award.

Yun's research has centered on the integration of light and life sciences. His work contributed to the emergence of swept-source optical coherence tomography (optical frequency domain imaging). His work led to the invention of "biological" lasers and living lasers— lasers that are made of biological materials or biocompatible forms such that they can be implemented and made implantable and/or injectable into biological systems. His research also contributed to the development of Brillouin microscopy and various implantable optical devices.
