= Ann Hochschild =

American microbiologist

- Occupation(s): Maude & Lillian Presley Professor of Microbiology; Chair of the Department of Microbiology
- Awards: Searle Scholar Award (1991); NIH Director's Pioneer Award (2008)

Academic background
- Education: Radcliffe College (A.B.)
- Alma mater: Harvard University (Ph.D.)
- Doctoral advisor: Mark Ptashne

Academic work
- Discipline: Microbiologist
- Website: https://hochschildlab.med.harvard.edu/

Ann Hochschild is an American microbiologist who is known for her work researching bacterial protein-protein interactions and the discovery of prion-forming proteins in bacteria. She is the Maude & Lillian Presley Professor of Microbiology and chair of the Microbiology at Harvard Medical School.

== Early life and education ==
Hochschild earned her A.B. in English literature from Radcliffe College. She earned her Ph.D. in cellular and developmental biology from Harvard University in 1986 under Mark Ptashne.

== Career ==
In 1989, Hochschild started as a faculty member at Harvard Medical School in the Department of Microbiology and Molecular Genetics. In 1991, she received the Searle Scholars Award, which is awarded to early career researchers to help build independent research programs. She was also awarded the Presidential Young Investigator Award from the National Science Foundation that same year.

In 2008, Hochschild received the National Institutes of Health Director's Pioneer Award to continue her work studying prion formation. In 2017, she published results in Science proving prion-like elements in Clostridium botulinum.

Hochschild was elected into the American Academy of Arts and Sciences in 2020 and National Academy of Sciences in the subfield of genetics in 2024.

== Notable awards and fellowships ==
- Searle Scholar Award in 1991
- Presidential Young Investigator Award in 1991
- American Heart Association Established Investigator Award
- NIH Director’s Pioneer Award in 2008
