= Paola Arlotta =

Italian molecular biologist (born 1971)

- Born: 1971 (age 54–55); Italy
- Education: University of Trieste; Portsmouth University
- Known for: Neural fate specification, brain organoids
- Scientific career
- Fields: Stem Cell Biology, Neuroscience
- Workplaces: Harvard University

Paola Arlotta (born 1971) is the Golub Family Professor of Stem Cell and Regenerative Biology at Harvard University and chair of the Harvard Stem Cell and Regenerative Biology (HSCRB). Her research focuses on the development of neuron types in the cerebral cortex. She is best known for her work using 3D cerebral organoids derived from human induced pluripotent stem cells (iPSCs) to study cortical development in neurodegenerative and neuropsychiatric disorders.

== Early life and education ==
Born in 1971, Arlotta grew up in Capriva del Friuli, Italy. She attended liceo scientifico Duca degli Abruzzi in Gorizia. She earned an M.S. in biochemistry from the University of Trieste and her Ph.D. in molecular biology from the University of Portsmouth in 2000. The title of her Ph.D. thesis was "The high mobility group protein I-C: transcriptional regulation and involvement in the formation of lipomas in transgenic mice". She then completed her postdoctoral research at Harvard Medical School under the mentorship of Jeffrey Macklis at Harvard Medical School. She worked in both Boston Children's Hospital and Massachusetts General Hospital studying neurogenesis and CNS repair. She was also an instructor in Neurosurgery at Harvard Medical School until 2007.

In 2007, Arlotta joined the faculty at Harvard University with a laboratory on the Cambridge campus. She became the Morris Kahn Associate Professor of Stem Cell and Regenerative Biology as well as a Faculty at the Harvard Stem Cell Institute. She was promoted to the Golub Family Professor of Stem Cell and Regenerative Biology at Harvard. In 2018, Arlotta was appointed the Chair of the Stem Cell Biology and was appointed to the Quantitative Biology Executive Council. She also served on the Life Sciences jury for the Infosys Prize in 2019.

== Career and research ==
Arlotta's research focuses on understanding the molecular factors guiding the birth, differentiation and assembly of neurons in the cerebral cortex. Her lab develops in vitro models of human cortical development and pathology using 3D cerebral organoids.

In addition to her positions in the Department of Stem Cell and Regenerative Biology at Harvard, Arlotta is also an Institute Member at the Broad Institute, an associate member of the Stanley Center for Psychiatric Research at the Broad Institute, and a principal faculty member at the Harvard Stem Cell Institute, where she is also co-director of the neuroscience program.

== Awards and honors ==
- Pradel Research Award (2024)
- George Ledlie Prize
- Fannie Cox Prize for Excellence in Science Teaching
- The Friedrich Wilhelm Bessel Research Award from the Alexander von Humboldt Foundation
- New York Stem Cell Foundation (NYSCF) Robertson Stem Cell Investigator (2011)
- George Ledlie Prize by the President and Fellows of Harvard College
- Elected a Member of the National Academy of Medicine (2024)
- Elected a Fellow of the American Academy of Arts and Sciences in 2024

== Select publications ==
- Arlotta, P; Molyneaux, BJ; Chen, J; Inoue, J; Kominami, R; Macklis, JD (20 January 2005). "Neuronal subtype-specific genes that control corticospinal motor neuron development in vivo". Neuron. 45 (2): 207–21. doi:10.1016/j.neuron.2004.12.036. PMID 15664173. S2CID 14060892.
- Arlotta, P.; Molyneaux, B. J.; Jabaudon, D.; Yoshida, Y.; Macklis, J. D. (16 January 2008). "Ctip2 Controls the Differentiation of Medium Spiny Neurons and the Establishment of the Cellular Architecture of the Striatum". Journal of Neuroscience. 28 (3): 622–632. doi:10.1523/JNEUROSCI.2986-07.2008. PMC 6670353. PMID 18199763.
- Velasco, Silvia; Kedaigle, Amanda J.; Simmons, Sean K.; Nash, Allison; Rocha, Marina; Quadrato, Giorgia; Paulsen, Bruna; Nguyen, Lan; Adiconis, Xian; Regev, Aviv; Levin, Joshua Z.; Arlotta, Paola (5 June 2019). "Individual brain organoids reproducibly form cell diversity of the human cerebral cortex". Nature. 570 (7762): 523–527. Bibcode:2019Natur.570..523V. doi:10.1038/S41586-019-1289-X. hdl:1721.1/125050. PMC 6906116. PMID 31168097. S2CID 174809216.
- Zonouzi, M; Berger, D; Jokhi, V; Kedaigle, A; Lichtman, J; Arlotta, P (4 June 2019). "Individual Oligodendrocytes Show Bias for Inhibitory Axons in the Neocortex". Cell Reports. 27 (10): 2799–2808.e3. doi:10.1016/j.celrep.2019.05.018. PMC 7968376. PMID 31167127.
- Quadrato, Giorgia; Nguyen, Tuan; Macosko, Evan Z.; Sherwood, John L.; Min Yang, Sung; Berger, Daniel R.; Maria, Natalie; Scholvin, Jorg; Goldman, Melissa; Kinney, Justin P.; Boyden, Edward S.; Lichtman, Jeff W.; Williams, Ziv M.; McCarroll, Steven A.; Arlotta, Paola (26 April 2017). "Cell diversity and network dynamics in photosensitive human brain organoids". Nature. 545 (7652): 48–53. Bibcode:2017Natur.545...48Q. doi:10.1038/NATURE22047. PMC 5659341. PMID 28445462.
- Tomassy, GS; Dershowitz, LB; Arlotta, P (February 2016). "Diversity Matters: A Revised Guide to Myelination". Trends in Cell Biology. 26 (2): 135–147. doi:10.1016/j.tcb.2015.09.002. PMC 4727993. PMID 26442841.
- Molyneaux, Bradley J.; Goff, Loyal A.; Brettler, Andrea C.; Chen, Hsu-Hsin; Brown, Juliana R.; Hrvatin, Siniša; Rinn, John L.; Arlotta, Paola (January 2015). "DeCoN: Genome-wide Analysis of In Vivo Transcriptional Dynamics during Pyramidal Neuron Fate Selection in Neocortex". Neuron. 85 (2): 275–288. doi:10.1016/J.NEURON.2014.12.024. PMC 4430475. PMID 25556833.
