= Elizabeth Sattely =

American biotechnology engineer

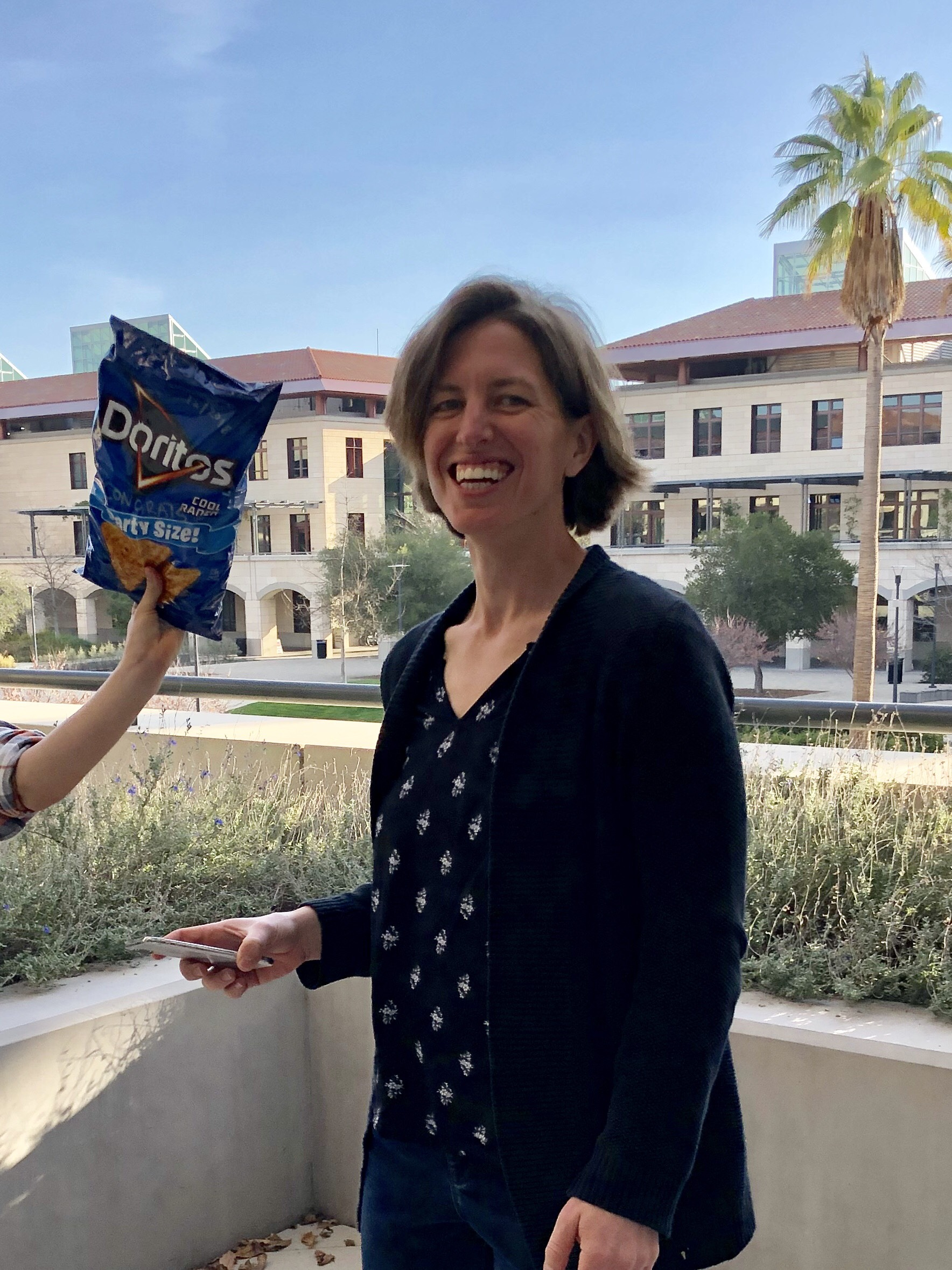

Elizabeth S. Sattely is an American scientist and biotechnology engineer. She is an Associate Professor of Chemical Engineering in the Department of Chemical Engineering, an HHMI investigator, and a ChEM-H Faculty Fellow at Stanford University.

== Education ==
Dr. Sattely completed her graduate training at Boston College in organic chemistry with Amir Hoveyda and her postdoctoral studies in biochemistry at Harvard Medical School with Christopher T. Walsh, where she worked on natural product biosynthesis in bacteria.

== Research ==
Inspired by human reliance on plants and plant-derived molecules for food and medicine, the Sattely laboratory is focused on the discovery and engineering of plant metabolic pathways to make molecules that can enhance human health. These engineering targets include:

- Phytoalexins
- Etoposide

Beyond fundamental research into biosynthesis of molecules important for human health, the Sattely lab also works on metabolites important for plant health, both in the realm of nutrient acquisition and defense response. Research is not only dedicated to molecules within the plant itself, but also to molecules involved in plant-microbe interactions. Examples are:

- Siderophores
- N-hydroxy pipecolic acid
- Biological nitrogen fixation

Another part of the laboratory involves the study of plant-derived value added small molecules, such as:

- 2-Mercaptobenzothiazole (MBT)
- Lignin valorization

== Awards ==
Work in the Sattely lab has been recognized by an NIH New Innovator Award, a DOE Early Career Award, an HHMI-Simons Faculty Scholar Award, a DARPA Young Investigator Award, and a AAAS Mason Award for Women in the Chemical Sciences.

== Personal life ==
Elizabeth Sattely is married to Dr. Michael Fischbach, associate professor of bioengineering at Stanford University. Her favorite bacterium is Azospirillum brasilense.

== Publications ==
- Discovery and engineering of plant chemistry, 2017
