= Denise Montell =

American biochemist and researcher

Denise Johnson Montell
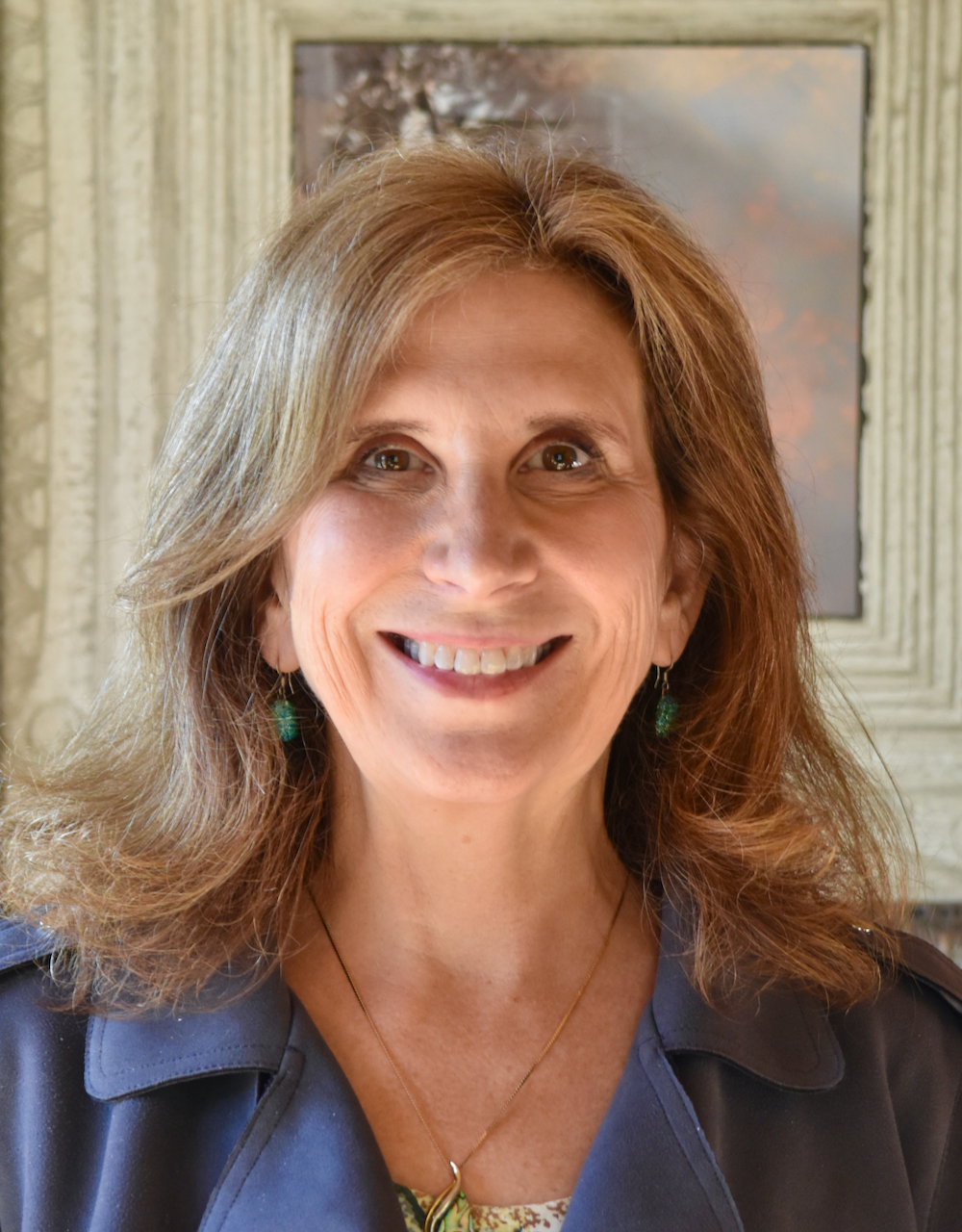
- Education: Stanford University; University of California, San Diego
- Scientific career
- Workplaces: Carnegie Institution for Science
- Thesis: Cell and substrate adhesion molecules in D̲r̲o̲s̲o̲p̲h̲i̲l̲a̲ embryogenesis (1989)
- Website: https://www.mcdb.ucsb.edu/people/faculty/denise-montell

Denise Johnson Montell is an American biologist who is the Duggan Professor of Molecular, Cellular, and Developmental Biology at the University of California, Santa Barbara. Her research considers the oogenesis process in Drosophila and border cell migration. She has served as president of the Genetics Society of America and was elected to the National Academy of Sciences in 2021.

== Early life and education ==
Montell grew up in a family of scientists and became interested in science at a young age. She was an undergraduate student at the University of California, San Diego, where she majored in biochemistry and cell biology. She moved to Stanford University for her graduate studies, where she investigated substrate adhesion molecules in Drosophila embryogenesis. Montell was a postdoctoral fellow with Allan C. Spradling at the Carnegie Institution for Science, where she developed a new model to study cell motility in vivo by combining cell biology and molecular genetics. She worked on a P element-mediated mutagenesis screening in Drosophila. She was appointed to the faculty at the Carnegie Institution for Science.

== Research and career ==
Montell joined the faculty at Johns Hopkins University in 1992. After ten years at Johns Hopkins, she was promoted to full professor, where she became founding director of the Center for Cell Dynamics. In 2013, she moved to the University of California, Santa Barbara, where she was made Duggan Professor. In 2020, Montell was appointed president of the Genetics Society of America.

Montell's research considers the oogenesis process in Drosophila and border cell migration. She has studied apoptosis, cell motility, and cell engulfment. Montell identified that cells, previously considered to be beyond the point of no return in the dying process, can recover and proliferate. The process, which Montell named anastasis, can salvage cells that are difficult to replace. Cell motility is the process by which embryos develop, wounds heal and immune systems fight disease. At the same time, cell motility can give rise to tumor metastasis. Montell created an in vivo model for the study of cell motility.

== Awards and honors ==
- 2014 Elected to the council of the American Society for Cell Biology
- 2014 National Institutes of Health Director's Pioneer Award
- 2017 Elected Fellow of the American Association for the Advancement of Science
- 2019 Elected Fellow of the American Society for Cell Biology
- 2021 Elected to the National Academy of Sciences
- 2024 Awarded the E.B. Wilson Medal

== Selected publications ==
- Honami Naora; Denise J Montell (1 May 2005). "Ovarian cancer metastasis: integrating insights from disparate model organisms". Nature Reviews Cancer. 5 (5): 355–366. doi:10.1038/nrc1611. ISSN 1474-175X. PMID 15864277. Wikidata Q36111930.
- Danfeng Cai; Shann-Ching Chen; Mohit Prasad; et al. (1 May 2014). "Mechanical feedback through E-cadherin promotes direction sensing during collective cell migration". Cell. 157 (5): 1146–1159. doi:10.1016/j.cell.2014.03.045. ISSN 0092-8674. PMC 4118667. PMID 24855950. Wikidata Q30585627.
- Denise J Montell (1 January 2003). "Border-cell migration: the race is on". Nature Reviews Molecular Cell Biology. 4 (1): 13–24. doi:10.1038/nrm1006. ISSN 1471-0072. PMID 12511865. Wikidata Q35038279.

== Personal life ==
Montell is married with two children. Her husband is Craig Montell, a neuroscientist and distinguished professor in the Department of Molecular, Cellular and Developmental Biology at the University of California, Santa Barbara. Her daughter Amanda Montell is an author of popular nonfiction books on linguistics. She has collaborated with her son Brandon Montell, a computer software engineer. He designed and patented the “I’m feeling lucky” feature on Google Earth.
