= Rosalind A. Segal =

American neurobiologist

- Born: 1958 (age 67–68); New York City, New York
- Education: Harvard University
- Known for: Developmental and Cellular Neuroscience
- Scientific career
- Fields: Neurobiology
- Doctoral advisor: David. J.L. Luck

Rosalind Anne Segal (born 1958) is an American neurobiologist. She is a Professor of Neurobiology at Harvard Medical School and the Dana Farber Cancer Institute., and the Dean for Graduate Education at Harvard Medical School Segal's work employs modern methods of cell and molecular biology to study the development of the mammalian brain with the goal of understanding how disruption of this normal process leads to the formation of brain malignancies.

== Biography ==
Segal graduated with a Bachelor of Arts degree in 1979 jointly awarded by Harvard College and Radcliffe College. In 1986, she received both an MD from Weill Cornell Medicine and a PhD from Rockefeller University. She performed her doctoral dissertation research in the laboratory of David Luck, and her residency training in neurology in the Harvard affiliated hospitals in the Longwood Medical Area. Segal completed postdoctoral research in molecular neuroscience in the laboratories of Ronald McKay and Charles Stiles. In 1994, she started her own laboratory at Harvard Medical School's Beth Israel Deaconess Medical Center. She moved the laboratory to the site of the Dana–Farber Cancer Institute in 1998.

== Research ==
Segal's research focuses on critical extracellular factors that control the development of the nervous system, from neural stem cells to functional neural circuits. A major focus has been the sonic hedgehog (Shh) signaling pathway. Segal defined the motif within Hedgehog proteins critical for binding to proteoglycans, defined the nature of the proteoglycan that serves as a selective Shh receptor, and demonstrated that proteoglycan interactions are needed for a proliferative response to Shh. Mutations that activate Shh signaling cause brain tumors and other malignancies, and thus these studies have provided new approaches for developing therapeutics for treating brain tumors.

Her research has also investigated later stages of brain development when precursor cells migrate away from the stem cell niche where they are born, proliferate, and eventually exit the cell cycle and take on the properties of neurons. Segal and her colleagues identified a factor brain-derived neurotrophic factor (BDNF) as a chemotactic factor that controls neuron migration. Once neurons have migrated to their final destination and become incorporated into functional neural circuits, she has shown that BDNF, and its close relative nerve growth factor (NGF), work together to maintain circuit function. Segal has demonstrated that BDNF and NGF are transported from the outside of a cell to the cell's interior via signaling endosomes that function as critical mediators of cell survival within mature neural circuits. Segal has also revealed a role for the local translation of select mRNAs at synapses to promote neural circuit survival and function.

== Academic leadership and awards ==
In addition to her research, a major emphasis of Segal's professional life has been devoted toward the education of the next generation of neuroscientists. She has served as a faculty advisor in science at Radcliffe College. She was also the co-chair of the Department of Cancer Biology at Dana Farber Cancer Institute, as well as the Director of Harvard's PhD Program in Neuroscience. She has mentored numerous graduate students and post-doctoral fellows, and serves as a faculty advisor for the Harvard Women in Neuroscience program.

She is the recipient of a number of awards that recognize her teaching and research accomplishments including the Robert Ebert Clinical Scholar's Award from the Klingenstein Foundation, a McDonnell Foundation Award from the James S. McDonnell Foundation, the National Institutes of Health Director's Pioneer Award in 2006, and the Casty Family Award for Achievement in Mentoring. She was awarded a two-year $250,000 grant from Alex's Lemonade Stand Foundation in 2014. In 2017, she won the Harold Amos Faculty Diversity Award from Harvard Medical School.

== Selected works ==
- Segal, Rosalind A.; Takahashi, Hiroshi; McKay, Ronald D.G. (December 1992). "Changes in neurotrophin responsiveness during the development of cerebellar granule neurons". Neuron. 9 (6): 1041–1052. doi:10.1016/0896-6273(92)90064-k. PMID 1463606. S2CID 23085882.
- Chan, Jennifer A; Balasubramanian, Srividya; Witt, Rochelle M; Nazemi, Kellie J; Choi, Yoojin; Pazyra-Murphy, Maria F; Walsh, Carolyn O; Thompson, Margaret; Segal, Rosalind A (April 2009). "Proteoglycan interactions with Sonic Hedgehog specify mitogenic responses". Nature Neuroscience. 12 (4): 409–417. doi:10.1038/nn.2287. PMC 2676236. PMID 19287388.
- Gruber Filbin, Mariella; Dabral, Sukriti K; Pazyra-Murphy, Maria F; Ramkissoon, Shakti; Kung, Andrew L; Pak, Ekaterina; Chung, Jarom; Theisen, Matthew A; Sun, Yanping; Franchetti, Yoko; Sun, Yu; Shulman, David S; Redjal, Navid; Tabak, Barbara; Beroukhim, Rameen; Wang, Qi; Zhao, Jean; Dorsch, Marion; Buonamici, Silvia; Ligon, Keith L; Kelleher, Joseph F; Segal, Rosalind A (November 2013). "Coordinate activation of Shh and PI3K signaling in PTEN-deficient glioblastoma: new therapeutic opportunities". Nature Medicine. 19 (11): 1518–1523. doi:10.1038/nm.3328. PMC 3923315. PMID 24076665.
- Dudek, Henryk; Datta, Sandeep Robert; Franke, Thomas F.; Birnbaum, Morris J.; Yao, Ryoji; Cooper, Geoffrey M.; Segal, Rosalind A.; Kaplan, David R.; Greenberg, Michael E. (31 January 1997). "Regulation of Neuronal Survival by the Serine-Threonine Protein Kinase Akt". Science. 275 (5300): 661–665. doi:10.1126/science.275.5300.661. PMID 9005851. S2CID 7658844.
- Ma, Qing; Jones, Dan; Borghesani, Paul R.; Segal, Rosalind A.; Nagasawa, Takashi; Kishimoto, Tadamitsu; Bronson, Roderick T.; Springer, Timothy A. (1998). "Impaired B-Lymphopoiesis, Myelopoiesis, and Derailed Cerebellar Neuron Migration in CXCR4- and SDF-1-Deficient Mice". Proceedings of the National Academy of Sciences of the United States of America. 95 (16): 9448–9453. Bibcode:1998PNAS...95.9448M. doi:10.1073/pnas.95.16.9448. JSTOR 45494. PMC 21358. PMID 9689100.
- Segal, Rosalind A.; Greenberg, Michael E. (1 March 1996). "Intracellular Signaling Pathways Activated by Neuropathic Factors". Annual Review of Neuroscience. 19 (1): 463–489. doi:10.1146/annurev.ne.19.030196.002335. PMID 8833451.
