= Brian Litt =

American neuroscientist (born 1960)

- Born: March 8, 1960 (age 66)
- Citizenship: American
- Education: Harvard University (AB); Johns Hopkins University (MD)
- Awards: NIH Director's Pioneer Award, (2020)
- Scientific career
- Fields: Neuroengineering, Computational Neuroscience, and Medicine
- Workplaces: University of Pennsylvania

Brian Litt is a Professor of Neurology, Neurosurgery and Bioengineering at the Perelman School of Medicine and University of Pennsylvania. He is the former director of the Penn Epilepsy Center, and is director of the Center for Neuroengineering and Therapeutics.

He earned an A.B.(1982) in engineering and applied science from Harvard and an M.D. degree (1986) from Johns Hopkins School of Medicine His residency in neurology was at Johns Hopkins Hospital from 1988–1991.

Litt's research team focuses on epilepsy but also conducts research in functional neurosurgery, network and computational neuroscience, movement disorders, intra-operative and ICU monitoring, machine learning, high-speed data, and other related areas.

He holds several patents and has co-founded medical device companies.

== Most cited papers ==
- Kim DH, Viventi J, Amsden JJ, Xiao J, Vigeland L, Kim YS, Blanco JA, Panilaitis B, Frechette ES, Contreras D, Kaplan DL. [etc/] Dissolvable films of silk fibroin for ultrathin conformal bio-integrated electronics. Nature materials. 2010 Jun;9(6):511-7. According to Google Scholar, it has been cited 1364 times.
- Viventi J, Kim DH, Vigeland L, Frechette ES, Blanco JA, Kim YS, Avrin AE, Tiruvadi VR, Hwang SW, Vanleer AC, Wulsin DF. [etc] Flexible, foldable, actively multiplexed, high-density electrode array for mapping brain activity in vivo. Nature neuroscience. 2011 Dec;14(12):1599. According to Google Scholar, it has been cited 935 times.
- Litt B, Echauz J. Prediction of epileptic seizures. The Lancet Neurology. 2002 May 1;1(1):22-30. According to Google Scholar, it has been cited 474 times.
- Kerrigan JF, Litt B, Fisher RS, Cranstoun S, French JA, Blum DE, Dichter M, Shetter A, Baltuch G, Jaggi J, Krone S. Electrical stimulation of the anterior nucleus of the thalamus for the treatment of intractable epilepsy. Epilepsia. 2004 Apr;45(4):346-54. . According to Google Scholar, it has been cited 433 times.

=== Awards and recognition ===
- 2020: NIH Director's Pioneer Award
- 2015: American Epilepsy Society's Research Recognition Award for Clinical Science
- 2013: Brain Research Foundation's Scientific Innovations Award
