= Hollis Cline =

American neuroscientist

Hollis T. Cline
- Education: University of California, Berkeley (PhD); Bryn Mawr College (BA)
- Known for: Neuroscience
- Scientific career
- Workplaces: Memorial Sloan Kettering Cancer Center; Rockefeller University; Yale University; Stanford University Medical Center; University of Iowa; Cold Spring Harbor Laboratory; The Scripps Research Institute

Hollis Tremaine Cline is an American neuroscientist and the Director of the Dorris Neuroscience Center at the Scripps Research Institute in California. Her research focuses on the impact of sensory experience on brain development and plasticity.

Cline is a Fellow of the American Association for the Advancement of Science and was awarded the Society for Neuroscience Mika Salpeter Lifetime Achievement Award in 2019. Cline was elected a member of the National Academy of Sciences in 2022.

== Education and career ==
Cline earned a bachelor's degree in biology from Bryn Mawr College in 1977. While an undergraduate, she worked at Rockefeller University in Christian de Duve’s lab.

In 1985, Cline earned a doctorate in neurobiology from the University of California, Berkeley, where she studied under Gunther Stent. She then joined Martha Constantine-Paton’s lab at Yale University in 1985 for postdoctoral studies, In 1989, Cline joined Richard W. Tsien’s lab as a postdoctoral fellow at Stanford University Medical Center.

Shortly thereafter, Cline was appointed to the faculty in the Department of Physiology and Biophysics at the University of Iowa Medical School. She moved to the Cold Spring Harbor Laboratory in 1994, where she was promoted to Professor in 1998. While at Cold Spring Harbor Laboratory, Cline was the Marie Robertson Professor of Neurobiology, and served as the Director of Research from 2002-2006. During that period, Cline received the NIH Director’s Pioneer Award. She moved to The Scripps Research Institute in 2008, where she is Chair of the Department Neuroscience. Cline was elected a Fellow of the American Association for the Advancement of Science in 2012, "for seminal studies of how sensory experience affects the development of brain structures and function and for generous national and international advisory service to neuroscience". She was awarded the Society for Neuroscience Mika Salpeter Lifetime Achievement Award in 2019. Cline served as the Secretary of the Society for Neuroscience in 2012 and then President of the Society for Neuroscience in 2016. She is a recent member of the Advisory Council for the National Eye Institute and is a current member of the Advisory Council for the National Institute of Neurological Diseases and Stroke and the NIH BRAIN Multi-Council Working Group.

== Research ==
Cline's research focuses on brain development, in particular the effect of visual experience of the development of the visual system. Her studies have helped increase understanding of mechanisms controlling topographic map formation, neurogenesis, synapse formation and plasticity, neuron development, and assembly of brain circuits. Cline's study demonstrated that sensory information, particularly visual input, activates activity-dependent cellular and molecular mechanisms that eventually regulate the formation and stability of synapses to control the development of neurons, brain circuits, and behavior. According to this hypothesis, various molecular and cellular processes that have an impact on synaptic stability will ultimately have an effect on brain connectivity and function. More recently, Cline has shown that exosomes are involved in the development of neurons and brain circuitry. Cline’s studies have relevance to a variety of developmental neurological disorders such as fragile X syndrome, Rett syndrome, autism spectrum disorders, and schizophrenia - which are the result of errors in the development of synaptic function and brain circuitry. Alongside her research, Cline is known for her work as a mentor and advocate.

== Awards and honours ==
- 1991 McKnight Neuroscience Scholar Award
- 2005 National Institutes of Health Director's Pioneer Award
- 2012 Fellow of the American Association for the Advancement of Science
- 2013 Scripps Research Institute Outstanding Mentor Award
- 2016 President of the Society for Neuroscience
- 2019 Society for Neuroscience Mika Salpeter Lifetime Achievement Award

== Selected publications ==
- Lisman, J.; Schulman, H.; Cline, H. (2002). "The molecular basis of CaMKII function in synaptic and behavioural memory". Nature Reviews Neuroscience. 3 (3): 175–190. doi:10.1038/nrn753. PMID 11994750. S2CID 5844720.
- Constantine-Paton, M.; Cline, H.; Debski, E. (1990). "Patterned activity, synaptic convergence, and the NMDA receptor in developing visual pathways". Annual Review of Neuroscience. 13: 129–154. doi:10.1146/annurev.ne.13.030190.001021. PMID 2183671.
- Wu, G.Y.; Malinow, R.; Cline, H.T. (1996). "Maturation of a Central Glutamatergic Synapse". Science. 274 (5289): 972–976. Bibcode:1996Sci...274..972W. doi:10.1126/science.274.5289.972. PMID 8875937. S2CID 110880.

Cline serves on the editorial boards of the Oxford Research Encyclopedia of Neuroscience, Frontiers in Neural Circuits, Journal of Developmental Biology, and Neural Development.

== See also ==
- Society for Neuroscience
- Scripps Research
