= Tamas L. Horvath =

Hungarian-American neuroscientist

- Born: 1967 (age 58–59); Nagykőrös, Hungary
- Education: University of Veterinary Sciences, Budapest; University of Szeged
- Known for: Hypothalamic control of metabolism; mitochondrial dynamics in neurons
- Notable work: Body, Brain, Behavior: Three Views and a Conversation (2022)
- Awards: NIH Director's Pioneer Award (2010); Ernst Oppenheimer Award (2012); Széchenyi Prize (2023); Member, National Academy of Medicine (2025)
- Scientific career
- Fields: Neuroscience, comparative medicine, neuroendocrinology
- Workplaces: Yale School of Medicine; University of Veterinary Medicine Budapest

Tamas L. Horvath (Hungarian: Horváth Tamás László; born 1967) is a Hungarian-American neuroscientist. He holds a D.V.M. and a Ph.D. in neurobiology. He is the Jean and David W. Wallace Professor and Chair of the Department of Comparative Medicine, and a professor of neuroscience and of obstetrics, gynecology, and reproductive sciences, at Yale School of Medicine.

He is also a research professor in the Department of Anatomy and Histology at the University of Veterinary Medicine Budapest. In 2025 he was elected to the National Academy of Medicine for work on hypothalamic regulation of systemic metabolism and on mitochondrial and neuronal plasticity.

== Early life and education ==
Horvath was born in 1967 in Nagykőrös, Hungary, and attended the Arany János Gimnázium there. He is a third-generation veterinarian on his father's side. He earned a Doctor of Veterinary Medicine (D.V.M.) degree from the Faculty of Veterinary Sciences in Budapest and a Ph.D. in neurobiology from what is now the University of Szeged (then Attila József University).

He began research in the anatomy department of the Budapest veterinary faculty under Ferenc Hajós before moving to the United States.

== Career ==
Horvath came to Yale School of Medicine in 1990 as a postdoctoral fellow in the Department of Obstetrics and Gynecology and later joined the faculty. He was named an associate research scientist in 1994 and an associate professor in 1999, with joint appointments in obstetrics and gynecology and in neurobiology. He became chair of Yale's Section (later Department) of Comparative Medicine in 2005 and a full professor in that section and in neurobiology and obstetrics, gynecology and reproductive sciences in 2006. In 2009 he founded the Yale Program on Integrative Cell Signaling and Neurobiology of Metabolism. In 2011 he was named the inaugural Jean and David W. Wallace Professor of Biomedical Research.

In 2008 the Alexander von Humboldt Foundation awarded him an Alexander von Humboldt Professorship on the nomination of the University of Cologne, which sought him for the CECAD ageing-research cluster; Cologne later listed him among its former international faculty while he remained at Yale. In 2014 he was a Hans Fischer Senior Fellow at the Institute for Advanced Study of the Technical University of Munich, hosted by Matthias Tschöp.

== Research ==
Horvath's published work concerns hypothalamic circuits that regulate energy balance and the role of mitochondrial proteins in neuronal signaling. The National Academy of Medicine cited him for "fundamental novel insights into hypothalamic regulation of systemic metabolism and establishing a key role for mitochondrial and neuronal plasticity," and for showing that those circuits also affect higher brain functions and neurodegeneration. University of Cologne materials described his earlier work as defining new principles in the regulation of energy balance and body-weight control.

Later reviews of leptin action treat the 2004 arcuate-nucleus rewiring study as evidence that metabolic hormones can remodel hypothalamic synapses, not only change firing rates.

=== Hypothalamic circuits, leptin, and ghrelin ===
In a 2004 paper in Science, Pinto, Horvath and colleagues reported that leptin rapidly altered the number of excitatory and inhibitory synapses onto neuropeptide Y and pro-opiomelanocortin neurons in the hypothalamic arcuate nucleus of leptin-deficient mice. A 2007 study in Nature Medicine reported that estradiol increased excitatory inputs onto POMC neurons in a leptin-independent manner and reduced food intake and body-weight gain in rodents.

A 2006 paper in Nature Neuroscience reported that circulating ghrelin reached the hippocampus, increased dendritic spine-synapse density, and was associated with changes in spatial learning and memory in mice. In 2008, Andrews, Horvath and colleagues reported in Nature that ghrelin's action on NPY/AgRP neurons involved the mitochondrial protein UCP2 and a reduction in free radicals. Subsequent reviews of hypothalamic UCP2 have treated that paper as a main demonstration that ghrelin-driven feeding and AgRP-neuron activation depend on UCP2-mediated control of reactive oxygen species and mitochondrial plasticity.

=== Mitochondria ===
Subsequent papers from the group have examined mitochondrial dynamics and uncoupling proteins in hypothalamic neurons and in models of metabolic and neurodegenerative disease.

=== Book ===
With Joy Hirsch and Zoltán Molnár he co-authored the book Body, Brain, Behavior: Three Views and a Conversation (Academic Press, an imprint of Elsevier, 2022). The volume combines chapters on endocrine physiology, social neuroscience, and developmental neuroscience with recorded conversations among the three authors.

== Awards and honors ==
- Alexander von Humboldt Professorship, Federal Republic of Germany (2008)
- NIH Director's Pioneer Award (2010)
- John K. and Mary E. Davidson Lectureship and Award, University of Toronto (2012)
- Ernst Oppenheimer Award, The Endocrine Society (2012)
- Honorary doctorate, Faculty of Veterinary Sciences, Szent István University, Budapest (2013)
- Named to Clarivate's list of Highly Cited Researchers (2022)
- Széchenyi Prize, Hungary (2023)
- Honorary doctorate, Faculty of Medicine, Leipzig University (2023)
- Elected member, National Academy of Medicine (2025)

== Selected publications ==
- Cowley, Michael A.; et al. (2001). "Leptin activates anorexigenic POMC neurons through a neural network in the arcuate nucleus". Nature. 411 (6836): 480–484. doi:10.1038/35078085. hdl:11336/71802. PMID 11373681.
- Pinto, Shirly; Roseberry, Aaron G.; Liu, Hongyan; Diano, Sabrina; Shanabrough, Marya; Cai, Xiaoli; Friedman, Jeffrey M.; Horvath, Tamas L. (2004). "Rapid rewiring of arcuate nucleus feeding circuits by leptin". Science. 304 (5667): 110–115. doi:10.1126/science.1089459. PMID 15064421.
- Diano, Sabrina; et al. (March 2006). "Ghrelin controls hippocampal spine synapse density and memory performance". Nature Neuroscience. 9 (3): 381–388. doi:10.1038/nn1656. PMID 16491079.
- Gao, Qian; et al. (January 2007). "Anorectic estrogen mimics leptin's effect on the rewiring of melanocortin cells and Stat3 signaling in obese animals". Nature Medicine. 13 (1): 89–94. doi:10.1038/nm1525. PMID 17195839.
- Andrews, Zane B.; et al. (2008). "UCP2 mediates ghrelin's action on NPY/AgRP neurons by lowering free radicals". Nature. 454 (7206): 846–851. doi:10.1038/nature07181. PMC 4101536. PMID 18668043.
- Horvath, Tamas L.; Hirsch, Joy; Molnár, Zoltán (2022). Body, Brain, Behavior: Three Views and a Conversation. London: Academic Press. ISBN 978-0-12-818093-8.
