= Kristin Baldwin =

American neuroscientist

Kristin K. Baldwin
- Born: Jan 2nd
- Citizenship: United States
- Known for: Stem Cell Research, iPSC, Neuroscience
- Scientific career
- Fields: Neuroscience

Kristin K. Baldwin is an American scientist who is a professor at the Department of Genetics and Development at Columbia University. Her research focuses on using reprogrammed and induced pluripotent stem cells to identify mechanisms and therapies related to human genetic risk for neurologic and cardiovascular disease. Her lab also studies how disease and aging affect the genome; they have used cloning to produce the first complete genome sequence of a single neuron and helped assess the effect of aging on induced pluripotent stem cells that may be used for cell therapies. They also design bespoke neuronal cells in a dish to understand brain function and disease. Baldwin's earlier work included being the first to clone a mouse from a neuron and being one of three groups to first produce an entire mouse from a skin cell by generating induced pluripotent stem cells. epigenetic changes of the genome and the brain.

== Early life and education ==
Baldwin was born and grew up in Ohio where she won the Razor-Baries prize in mathematics at Ohio State University while still a high school student. As a National Merit Scholar she completed a Bachelor of Science in Economics and Zoology with honors at Duke University, Durham, NC. She completed her PhD in Immunology at Stanford University, CA in 1998.

== Career and research ==
Baldwin was a Ph.D. student and Howard Hughes Medical Institute fellow in the Department of Microbiology and Immunology, Howard Hughes Medical Institute, Stanford University, Stanford, CA, in the laboratory of Mark M. Davis. From 1998 to 2005 she was an associate research scientist / postdoctoral research fellow at the Center for Neurobiology and Behavior, Howard Hughes Medical Institute, Columbia University Medical Center, New York, NY. in the laboratory of Richard Axel. Since 2006, she has been an assistant professor, associate professor and full professor at Scripps Research. Baldwin returned to Columbia University in June, 2020 as a Professor of Genetics and Development and is remains an adjunct Professor at the Department of Neuroscience and Investigator, Dorris Neuroscience Center at Scripps Research and an adjunct professor at the University of California San Diego (UCSD) Department of Neuroscience. She is a member of the Sanford Consortium for Regenerative Medicine.

Baldwin's recent research has used genome editing of induced pluripotent stem cells to decipher the function of the most expensive and impactful known risk locus for cardiovascular disease. Her lab also uses direct conversion of fibroblasts to functional neurons or reprogramming of induced pluripotent stem cells (iPSC) to neurons, and studies their gene expression to define neuronal subtypes in normal development and different diseases, such as Alzheimer's disease, autism, Friedreich's ataxia or addiction. Recently, her group also identified and characterized antibody libraries for de-differentiating cells.

== Awards and honors ==
- NIH Director's Pioneer Award (2016)
- Kavli Fellow and Session Chair, Kavli Frontiers of Science Symposium (2012)
- Donald E. and Delia B. Baxter Foundation Faculty Scholar (2011)
- California institute of regenerative medicine (CIRM) New Faculty Awardee (2008)
- Pew Scholar in the Biological Sciences (2007)
- Whitehall Grant Award (2007)
