= James Eberwine =

American molecular neurobiologist

- Known for: Messenger RNA research
- Spouse: Joan-Marie Kienlen (m. 1993)
- Awards: National Institutes of Health Director's Pioneer Award

Academic background
- Education: BSc, Biochemistry, 1978, Yale University; MA, Biochemistry, 1979, PhD, 1984, Columbia University
- Thesis: Glucocorticoid and corticotropin releasing hormone regulation of pro-opiomelanocortin gene expression (1984)

James H. Eberwine is an American molecular neurobiologist. He is the Elmer Holmes Bobst Professor of Pharmacology at the University of Pennsylvania.

== Early life and education ==
Eberwine was born to parents Mary Jo and Paul Eberwine. He graduated from Yale University with a Bachelor of Science degree in biochemistry and earned his graduate degrees in the same subject at Columbia University. Following graduation, Eberwine married Joan-Marie Kienlen, an administrative assistant at the University of Pennsylvania, in 1993.

== Career ==
Following his PhD, Eberwine joined the faculty at the University of Pennsylvania as a professor of Pharmacology. Through the early 1990s, Eberwine focused on molecular techniques that amplify RNA to verify that electrical activity in a single neuron simultaneously changes the abundance of multiple RNAs inside it. This interest led him to develop the single-cell PCR, the aRNA amplification protocol, and coined the phrase "expression profile" to describe the relative abundances of RNAs.

In 2001, Eberwine and postdoctoral student Christy Jobs published "Identification of sites for exponential translation in living dendrites," which proved there was a pattern to protein manufacture in the hippocampus. To reach this conclusion, they grew neurons from the hippocampus away from the cell body using a procedure known as multiphoton microscopy. This procedure then allowed the scientists to examine the pattern of fluorescence across space and time. Following this discovery, Eberwine co-developed a technique to identify specific Messenger RNA (mRNA) associated with a particular binding protein connected with Fragile X syndrome. In 2006, Eberwine and his research team also found that mRNA and protein encoding Elk-1 were localized in the dendrites of intact rodent neurons. This discovery led to the suggestion that the protein could play a role in cell death, and mitochondria-related diseases such as neurodegeneration and schizophrenia. As a result of his research, Eberwine he was appointed the Elmer Holmes Bobst Professor of Pharmacology.

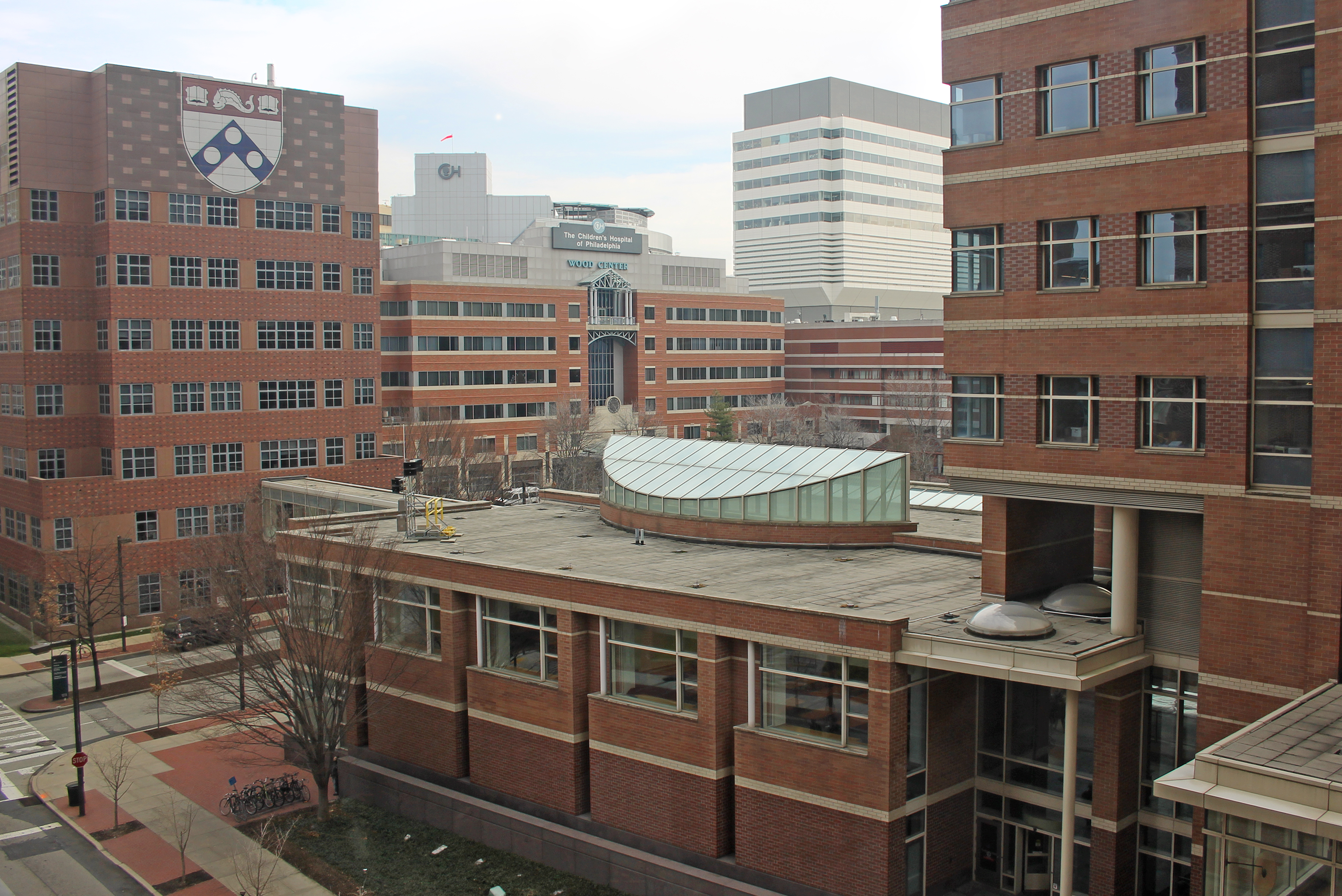
Medical and research facilities of the University of Pennsylvania School of Medicine and the Children's Hospital of Philadelphia.

In 2008, Eberwine was the recipient of a National Institutes of Health Director's Pioneer Award to fund his research into mRNA. His research had focused on the concept of transferring the catalog of RNA molecules from one cell to another in a way that made the recipient cells' survival dependent on the donor RNA. The following year, his research team changed a neuron into an astrocyte-like cell. His research into reprogramming cells led to the possibility for a new type of cell-based therapy for neurodegenerative and other diseases. His research partner Jai-Yoon Sul described their research as "overturn[ing] the notion that all cells are permanently hardwired with little ability to change their physiology." A few years later, he also became the first to change two different cell types into a heart cell using mRNAs and earned the Senior Scholar Award from Ellison Medical Foundation for Aging Research.

Eberwine soon earned the 2012 McKnight Technological Innovations in Neuroscience Award from the Endowment Fund for Neuroscience to support his research into "developing and applying innovative technologies for studying the brain and its diseases." In 2014, he was elected a Fellow of the National Academy of Inventors. In 2017, Eberwine's research team became the first to sequence DNA from a single mitochondrion in an effort to cease mutations that drive some diseases. Following this discovery, he was named to an international team of researchers to better understand oxidative phosphorylation. He was also one of three researchers to receive the 2017 Scientific Innovations Award from the Brain Research Foundation. In 2019, he received his second NIH Director's Pioneer Award to fund his research into RNA structure within single cells in cortex and hippocampus tissue in the brains of mice and humans. His research also earned him an election into the National Academy of Medicine.
