= Sara Sawyer =

American professor

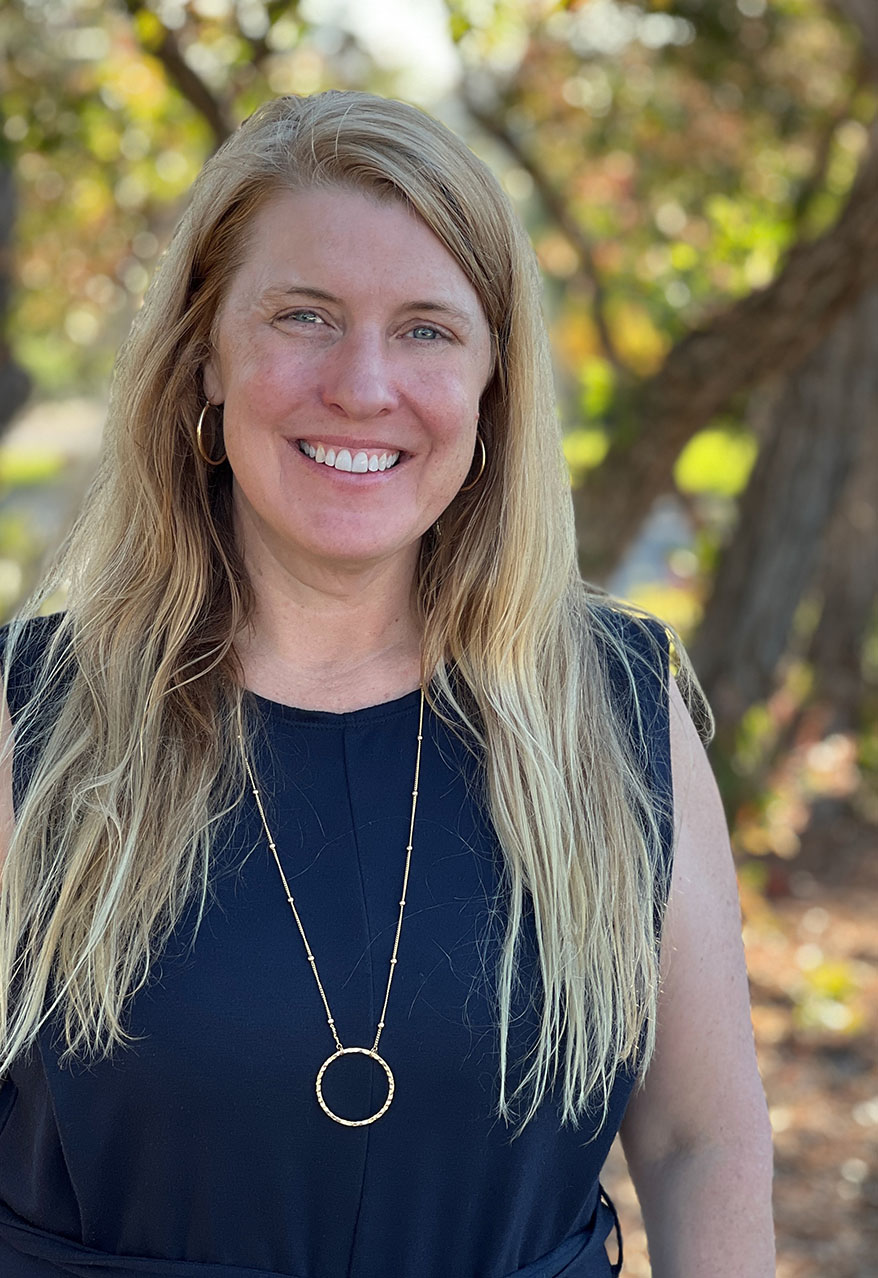
Sara Sawyer

Dr. Sara Sawyer is a professor at the University of Colorado Boulder. She has received national and international prizes in virology. In 2011 she was as awarded the Presidential Early Career Award for Scientists and Engineers (PECASE) by President Barack Obama at the White House. In 2022, the National Institutes of Health recognized her with the Director’s “Pioneer” award, and in 2018 with the “Avant-Garde” award. Dr. Sawyer serves on the NIH Office of AIDS Research Advisory Council. In 2020, she co-founded Darwin Biosciences located in Boulder, Colorado. She holds a Ph.D. from Cornell University. Her current research focuses on virus host switching, with applications ranging from the emergence of new viruses to the creation of new HIV vaccine models.

== Early life and education ==
Sawyer was born in Olathe, Kansas. She was an undergraduate student at the University of Kansas, where she majored in Chemical Engineering. As an undergraduate she worked on fuel cell technology. After graduating, Sawyer worked in the oil industry as an offshore drilling engineer in the Gulf of Mexico. She moved to Cornell University for her graduate studies, where she studied DNA replication. Sawyer was a postdoctoral fellow with Harmit Malik and Micheal Emerman at the Fred Hutchinson Cancer Research Center in Seattle, WA.

== Research and career ==
From 2008 to 2014, Sawyer was a professor at the University of Texas Austin. In 2015, she moved to the University of Colorado Boulder with her research team. There, they joined the BioFrontiers Institute.

During the COVID-19 pandemic, Sawyer investigated how SARS-CoV-2 spreads between infected people. As part of this effort, she developed a fast, cheap and easy COVID-19 screening test. The test was based on a Reverse Transcription Loop-mediated Isothermal Amplification (RT-LAMP). She analyzed COVID test samples collected from students and staff at the University of Colorado Boulder between August and November 2021. She found that only 2% of COVID patients were responsible for 90% of the circulating virus.

== Awards and honors ==
- 2022 National Institutes of Health (NIH) Director's Pioneer Award
- 2019 Lab Venture Challenge Winner
- 2018 Richard M. Elliott Award in Virology (University of Glasgow, Scotland)
- 2018 Avant-Garde award from NIH NIDA
- 2013 UT Austin College of Natural Sciences Teaching Excellence Award
- 2013 Burroughs Wellcome Fund Investigator in the Pathogenesis of Infectious Disease
- 2012 Named “Professor of Excellence” at UT Austin
- 2011 Presidential Early Career Award for Scientists and Engineers (PECASE)
- 2011 Kavli Fellow of the National Academy of Sciences
- 2009 Alfred P. Sloan Fellow in Computational and Evolutionary Molecular Biology
- 2007 Andy Kaplan Prize in Retrovirology
- 2006 Burroughs Wellcome Career Award in the Biomedical Sciences
- 2005 NIH National Research Service Award (NRSA) post-doctoral fellowship
- 2004 NIH Postdoctoral Training Grant
- 2000 Graduate Research Award - Cornell Dept. of Molecular Biology and Genetics

== Selected publications ==
A list of publications can be viewed on Dr. Sawyer's Google Scholar page.
