= Affective sensation =

Sensation accompanied with a strong compulsion to act on it

Affective sensation is an occurrence of sensation accompanied with a strong compulsion to act on it. It refers, mostly in neuroscience, to the emotional sensibility in response to affective stimuli of a particular valence. It is transmitted via the spinothalamic tract through the spinal cord, and can be associated with reflex actions such as the scratch, gag, and withdrawal reflexes. Sensory processing in the brain interacts with behavioral choices, such as decisions to eat or to stop eating, in both healthy individuals and those with eating disorders.

== Background and mechanism ==
Affective sensory information is transmitted via the spinothalamic tract. The sensation information is then accompanied by a compulsion to act. For instance, the bottom-up approach would have an itch accompanied by the need to scratch, and a painful stimulus inducing the desire to withdraw from the pain.

The location of the spinothalamic tract is important clinically due to the characteristic sensory deficits that follow certain spinal cord injuries. For instance, a unilateral spinal lesion will produce sensory loss of touch, pressure, vibration, and proprioception below the lesion on the same side. The pathways for pain and temperature, however, cross the spinal cord midline to ascend on the opposite side of the cord. Therefore, diminished sensation of pain below the lesion will be observed on the side opposite the mechanosensory loss and the lesion.

== Affect ==
Affective sensation deals with response-emotionality and is distinct from presentative, or neutral, sensation. This is due to affective stimuli which can have positive, negative, or neutral valence. These stimuli can be sensed individually as well as in an integrated manner such that positive and negative affective stimuli can be combined to influence experiential affective sensation and response. In the case of combination, recency and contrast effects on overall affect are influential such that, for example, a negative stimuli followed by a positive stimuli yields an overall positive affect.

=== Emotional sensing ===
Subjective well-being draws from both cognitive and affective components, combining general evaluations of ones' life with overall affective sensitive-impressions. Neural measures of affective quality of life have been positively correlated with greater left alpha activity in the superior PFC, gray matter volume in multiple prefrontal cortices, spontaneous activity in the right amygdala, and even emotional intelligence. Those with affective disorders may also demonstrate differences in affective sensation as a result of mood-dependent alterations in brain arousal regulation, especially seen between those with mania, depression, and those without the disorder. Negative affectivity tends to be related to greater levels of social anxiety, anxious arousal, and anxiety sensitivity.

== Physical and mental modulation ==
Physical pathological sensation, as occurs in IBS, COPD, and other illnesses, is also influential in affective sensation and response. The emotional response to especially a chronic illness can be correlated with its severity. This has been shown in COPD, where emotionally-driven descriptions of sensation due to breathing impairments may reflect the severity of the illness and probability of long-term, responsal behavior changes. Additionally, in IBS patients, affective sensation and its correlative brain areas including the ACC, insula, and VMPFC demonstrated heightened fMRI activity in response to painful visceral stimuli, and an inability to down-regulate their activation and modulate the emotional response to pain. This link between perceptual intensity and affective sensation persists in the case of chili pepper consumption. Those individuals who eat chili peppers more often, and presumably enjoy them, also report less burning sensation in response to eating chilis. While this could be due to either individual taste-perception differences or intensity judgement differences, it is more likely due to the latter because previous spicy food-consumption experiences do not correlate with the differences in affective sensation responses.

=== Taste sensation ===
Affective sensation can also be modulated using the top-down approach with cognitive factors influencing hedonic experience, such as with soup labeled "rich and delicious" inducing greater positive affect than when labeled "boiled vegetable water." This modulation can be seen in the orbitofrontal cortex and pregenual cingulate cortex. Taste serves to identify potential nutrients and toxins. For example, when one tastes a potentially nutritious stimulus, the connectivity between the insula and a feeding network including the hypothalamus, ventral pallidum, and striatum is greater than when tasting a potentially harmful stimulus. These results support the existence of an integrated supramodal flavor system in the anterior ventral insula that preferentially communicates with the circuits guiding feeding when the flavor is potentially nutritive.

== See also ==
- Central nervous system
- Reflex arc
- Spinothalamic tract
