= Stephen Liberles =

Stephen Liberles is a molecular neuroscientist at Harvard University and Investigator of the Howard Hughes Medical Institute. Following an undergraduate degree in chemistry at Harvard University, he remained in the Chemistry Department for his Ph.D., working with Stuart Schreiber. He received postdoctoral training with Linda B. Buck, where he characterized trace amine-associated receptors and formyl peptide receptors.

As an independent scientist, he has made advances in understanding olfactory and pheromone signaling in mammalian systems as well as uncovering the roles of the vagus nerve. He is also known for uncovering the molecular basis of sweet taste perception in hummingbirds in joint work with Maude Baldwin and Scott V. Edwards. A second study of his of importance in mechanistic molecular evolution characterized the compounds rodents recognize to avoid carnivore predators. His current research focusses on interoception.

Liberles currently runs an active research group. His trainees include current faculty members at the Max Planck Institute, Yale University, and the Shanghai Jiao Tong University School of Medicine.
