= Gary J. Pielak =

American biological chemistry professor

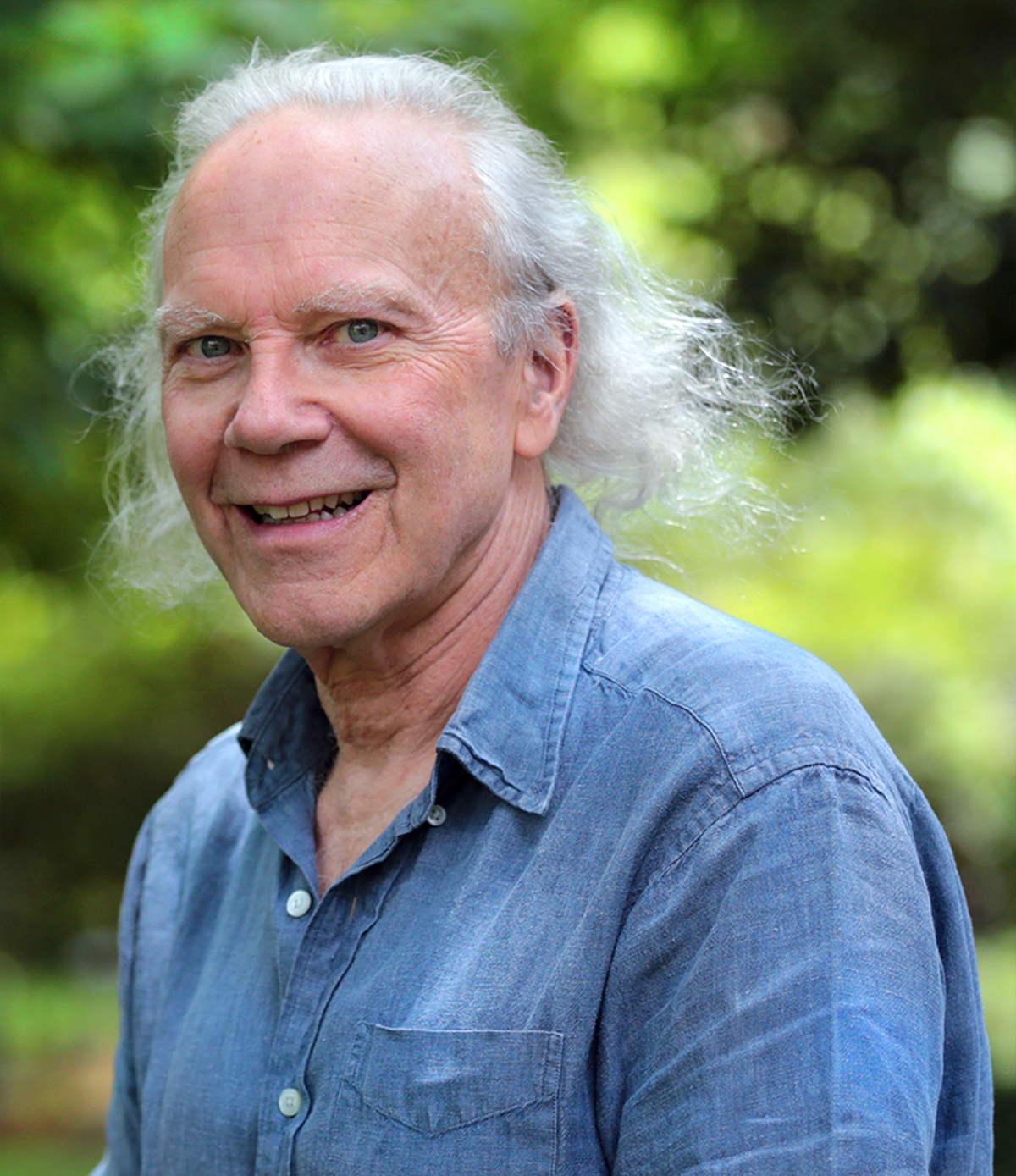
Gary Pielak

Gary J. Pielak (born July 17, 1955) is an American biological chemist who is known for developing quantitative techniques for measuring protein structure, stability, diffusion, and concentration in living cells, and under crowded conditions.

Pielak is the Kenan Distinguished Professor of Chemistry, Biochemistry and Biophysics at the University of North Carolina at Chapel Hill School of Medicine, Lineberger Comprehensive Cancer Center, and Department of Chemistry. He is a Fellow of the Biophysical Society.

== Education ==
Pielak earned a B.A. in chemistry, cum laude, from Bradley University in 1977, and a Ph.D. in biochemistry 1983 from Washington State University under J. Ivan Legg. His dissertation was titled "Characterization of Arsanilazo & Sulfanilazo Proteins". He conducted postdoctoral work studying the functional role of certain amino acid residues on cytochrome c electron transfer at the University of British Columbia with Nobel Prize-winner Michael Smith and at the University of Oxford with Robert J.P. Williams. He joined the Department of Chemistry at the University of North Carolina at Chapel Hill in 1989.

== Research ==
Using in-cell nuclear magnetic resonance spectroscopy, a technique he helped develop, Pielak determined that the effects of in-cell crowding do not arise solely from the close-packed nature of the cytoplasm but rather that repulsive and attractive chemical interactions between cellular components determine the effects of macromolecular crowding. These interactions organize the inside of cells, controlling metabolism and signaling. He and his collaborators have presented a quantitative model to explain crowding effects that is independent of crowder identity. For his work in this area, he received an NIH Director's Pioneer Award in 2006.

== Selected honors ==
Gary Pielak serves on the Editorial Advisory Board of the journal Protein Science, and on the Editorial Board of the journal Magnetic Resonance Letters. He was an invited speaker at the 2017 Nobel Symposium on Protein Folding: From Mechanisms to Impact on Cells, in Stockholm, Sweden.

In 2023, Pielak received both the Johnston Teaching Excellence Award and the Faculty Award for Excellence in Doctoral Mentoring from the University of North Carolina at Chapel Hill. He also presented the McElvain Lecture at the University of Wisconsin, Madison that year. In 2024, he was an invited speaker at Protein Folding Dynamics Gordon Research Conference in Galveston, Texas. In 2025 Pielak gave the keynote lecture at the Gibbs Conference on Biothermodynamics.

In 2025, Pielak and collaborator Brian Kuhlman received a $1 million Science and Engineering Research Award from the W. M. Keck Foundation to investigate why proteins designed by artificial intelligence often behave differently from natural proteins despite similar structures. The project applies Pielak's expertise in nuclear magnetic resonance spectroscopy to measure the internal dynamics and stability of AI-designed enzymes, including proteins created in the laboratory of Nobel laureate David Baker.

Fulbright Program

In 2026, Pielak received a Distinguished Scholar Award from the Fulbright U.S. Scholar Program, funding a four-month research residency in Jerusalem, Israel, with longtime collaborator Daniel Harries of the Hebrew University of Jerusalem. The residency supports work on a quantitative model of macromolecular crowding that treats both steric exclusion and chemical interactions between proteins and their surroundings, and on testing the model against families of AI-designed proteins.

== Selected publications ==
"Physicochemical properties of cells and their effects on intrinsically disordered proteins (IDPs)" (2014). Francois-Xavier Theillet, Andres Binolfi, Tamara Frembgen-Kesner, Karan Hingorani, Mohona Sarkar, Ciara Kyne, Conggang Li, Peter B Crowley, Lila Gierasch, Gary J Pielak, Adrian H Elcock, Anne Gershenson, Philipp Selenko. Chemical Reviews 114 (13), 6661-6714.

"FlgM gains structure in living cells" (2002). Matthew M Dedmon, Chetan N Patel, Gregory B Young, Gary J Pielak, Proceedings of the National Academy of Sciences 99 (20), 12681-12684.

"Impact of Protein Denaturants and Stabilizers on Water Structure" (2004). Joseph D. Batchelor, Alina Olteanu, Ashutosh Tripathy, and Gary J. Pielak, J. Am. Chem. Soc. 2004, 126, 7, 1958–1961.

"Macromolecular Crowding and Protein Stability" (2012). Yaqiang Wang, Mohona Sarkar, Austin E. Smith, Alexander S. Krois, and Gary J. Pielak, J. Am. Chem. Soc. 2012, 134, 40, 16614–16618.
