= Ken A. Paller =

American psychologist

- Born: Los Angeles, California
- Education: University of California, Los Angeles; University of California at San Diego
- Scientific career
- Fields: Memory and Sleep
- Workplaces: Northwestern University; University of California, San Diego; Yale University; University of California, Berkeley; University of Manchester
- Website: https://faculty.wcas.northwestern.edu/paller/ https://cogns.northwestern.edu/

Ken A. Paller is an American neuroscientist who is a professor of psychology at Northwestern University in Evanston, Illinois, USA. He holds the James Padilla Chair in Arts & Sciences and serves as Director of the Cognitive Neuroscience Program in the Weinberg College of Arts & Sciences at Northwestern. He directs the Training Program in the Neuroscience of Human Cognition at Northwestern, with support from the National Institute of Neurological Disorders and Stroke. His work in cognitive neuroscience focuses on human memory, consciousness, sleep, dreaming, and related topics.

Paller has published over 300 scientific articles, reviews, and book chapters. His research has been funded by the National Science Foundation, the National Institutes of Health. the Mind Science Foundation, the Mind and Life Institute, the McKnight Foundation and the Alzheimer's Association, among others. Paller served as Editor for the Memory Section of the journal Neuropsychologia from 2008 to 2016, and remains on the Editorial Advisory Board. From 2011 to 2015 he served on the Annual Meeting Program Committee for the Cognitive Neuroscience Society, chairing the committee for 2014 and 2015. He is a Fellow of the Association for Psychological Science and a Fellow of the Mind and Life Institute.

== Research ==
Paller's early research focused on aspects of human memory, including encoding and retrieval. He studied patients with memory disorders and healthy individuals using behavioral, electrophysiological, and neuroimaging methods. His early work documented neural signals at initial memory formation that predicted whether or not information would be remembered later. In a paper with Marta Kutas and Andrew R. Mayes in 1987, he introduced the term Dm to refer to the electrophysiological differences produced as a function of later memory performance. With Brian Gonsalves and other colleagues, he studied neural events that led to false memories. With Joel Voss, he also used electrophysiological methods to document differences in brain responses between conscious and unconscious memory phenomena. Whereas memory phenomena are typically assessed in recall and recognition tests (declarative memory tests), Voss and Paller found different results when unconscious memory was assessed, as in conceptual priming and implicit memory tests.

Paller's later research concerned the idea that learning is not a function only of the initial acquisition of knowledge, but that there are additional processing steps (known as consolidation) and that some of the work of consolidation takes place in the brain during sleep. Work in his laboratory was prominent in showing how subtle auditory stimulation during sleep could shape memory storage.

These studies used a method that came to be known as Targeted Memory Reactivation (TMR). Studies with TMR showed that many types of learning are improved when pre-sleep learning is followed by memory reactivation during sleep.

Paller's lab group also contributed to adapting the TMR method to produce lucid-dreaming experiences. In the study of these unusual experiences, when people realize they are dreaming in the midst of a dream, real-time two-way communication between dreamer and experimenter was demonstrated. In this way, the study of dreams can now include data on people's experiences during a dream along with associated neural activity, instead of relying exclusively on people's reports after they wake up to find out about their dreams.

== Selected papers ==
- Paller, Ken A.; Creery, Jessica D.; Schechtman, Eitan (2021-01-04). "Memory and Sleep: How Sleep Cognition Can Change the Waking Mind for the Better". Annual Review of Psychology. 72: 123–150. doi:10.1146/annurev-psych-010419-050815. ISSN 0066-4308. PMC 7983127. PMID 32946325.
- Voss, Joel L.; Lucas, Heather D.; Paller, Ken A. (2012). "More than a feeling: Pervasive influences of memory without awareness of retrieval". Cognitive Neuroscience. 3 (3–4): 193–207. doi:10.1080/17588928.2012.674935. ISSN 1758-8928. PMC 4385384. PMID 24171735.
- Konkoly, Karen R.; Appel, Kristoffer; Chabani, Emma; Mangiaruga, Anastasia; Gott, Jarrod; Mallett, Remington; Caughran, Bruce; Witkowski, Sarah; Whitmore, Nathan W.; Mazurek, Christopher Y.; Berent, Jonathan B.; Weber, Frederik D.; Türker, Başak; Leu-Semenescu, Smaranda; Maranci, Jean-Baptiste (2021-04-12). "Real-time dialogue between experimenters and dreamers during REM sleep". Current Biology. 31 (7): 1417–1427.e6. Bibcode:2021CBio...31E1417K. doi:10.1016/j.cub.2021.01.026. ISSN 0960-9822. PMC 8162929. PMID 33607035.
- Hu, Xiaoqing; Cheng, Larry Y.; Chiu, Man Hey; Paller, Ken A. (2020). "Promoting memory consolidation during sleep: A meta-analysis of targeted memory reactivation". Psychological Bulletin. 146 (3): 218–244. doi:10.1037/bul0000223. ISSN 0033-2909. PMC 7144680. PMID 32027149.
- Paller, Ken A. (2017). "Sleeping in a Brave New World: Opportunities for Improving Learning and Clinical Outcomes through Targeted Memory Reactivation". Current Directions in Psychological Science. 26 (6): 532–537. doi:10.1177/0963721417716928. ISSN 0963-7214. PMC 5798898. PMID 29422722.
- Papalambros, NA; Santostasi, G; Malkani, RG; Braun, R; Weintraub, S; Paller, KA; Zee, PC (2017). "Acoustic Enhancement of Sleep Slow Oscillations and Concomitant Memory Improvement in Older Adults". Frontiers in Human Neuroscience. 11: 109. doi:10.3389/fnhum.2017.00109. PMC 5340797. PMID 28337134.
- Paller, Ken A.; Creery, Jessica D.; Florczak, Susan M.; Weintraub, Sandra; Mesulam, M.-Marsel; Reber, Paul J.; Kiragu, Jessica; Rooks, Joshua; Safron, Adam; Morhardt, Darby; O’Hara, Mary; Gigler, Kathryn L.; Molony, John M.; Maslar, Michael (May 2015). "Benefits of Mindfulness Training for Patients With Progressive Cognitive Decline and Their Caregivers". American Journal of Alzheimer's Disease & Other Dementias. 30 (3): 257–267. doi:10.1177/1533317514545377. PMC 4363074. PMID 25154985.
- Paller, Ken A.; Voss, Joel L.; Westerberg, Carmen E. (2009). "Investigating the Awareness of Remembering". Perspectives on Psychological Science: A Journal of the Association for Psychological Science. 4 (2): 185–199. doi:10.1111/j.1745-6924.2009.01118.x. ISSN 1745-6916. PMID 26158944. S2CID 7079283.
- Rudoy, John D.; Voss, Joel L.; Westerberg, Carmen E.; Paller, Ken A. (2009-11-20). "Strengthening Individual Memories by Reactivating them During Sleep". Science. 326 (5956): 1079. Bibcode:2009Sci...326.1079R. doi:10.1126/science.1179013. ISSN 0036-8075. PMC 2990343. PMID 19965421.
- Gonsalves, Brian; Reber, Paul J.; Gitelman, Darren R.; Parrish, Todd B.; Mesulam, M.-Marsel; Paller, Ken A. (2004). "Neural evidence that vivid imagining can lead to false remembering". Psychological Science. 15 (10): 655–660. doi:10.1111/j.0956-7976.2004.00736.x. ISSN 0956-7976. PMID 15447635. S2CID 15660005.
- Gonsalves, B.; Paller, K. A. (2000). "Neural events that underlie remembering something that never happened". Nature Neuroscience. 3 (12): 1316–1321. doi:10.1038/81851. ISSN 1097-6256. PMID 11100153. S2CID 15150606.
- Paller, Ken A.; Wagner, Anthony D. (2002). "Observing the transformation of experience into memory". Trends in Cognitive Sciences. 6 (2): 93–102. doi:10.1016/s1364-6613(00)01845-3. ISSN 1364-6613. PMID 15866193. S2CID 12212791.
- Paller, K. A.; Kutas, M.; Mayes, A. R. (1987). "Neural correlates of encoding in an incidental learning paradigm". Electroencephalography and Clinical Neurophysiology. 67 (4): 360–371. doi:10.1016/0013-4694(87)90124-6. ISSN 0013-4694. PMID 2441971.
