= Jeffrey Macklis =

American neuroscientist

Jeffrey D. Macklis is an American neuroscientist. He is the Max and Anne Wien Professor of Life Sciences in the Department of Stem Cell and Regenerative Biology and Center for Brain Science at Harvard University, Professor of Neurology [Neuroscience] at Harvard Medical School, and on the Executive Committee and a Member of the Principal Faculty of the Neuroscience / Nervous System Diseases Program at the Harvard Stem Cell Institute.

== Education and career ==
Macklis received two S.B. degrees in bioelectrical engineering and in literature/philosophy from the Massachusetts Institute of Technology. He received his M.D. and D.Sc.Tech. in 1984 from Harvard Medical School (HMS) and the Harvard–MIT Division of Health Sciences and Technology (HST); his graduate school advisor was Prof. Richard L. Sidman. He later completed a postdoctoral fellowship in developmental neuroscience with Sidman. Macklis trained clinically in internal medicine at Brigham and Women’s Hospital (BWH) and in adult neurology in the Harvard-Longwood Neurological Training Program, then pursued a largely 90% laboratory / 10% clinical career specializing in Parkinson's disease-related neurodegenerative disorders and adolescent-young adult neurology in his earlier years. He has not been clinically active since 2002.

Macklis first established his laboratory in the Basic Science Division of Neuroscience of Boston Children's Hospital (BCH) [now Kirby Center]. He also co-directed the Parkinson's Disease and Related Disorders Program at BWH. In 2002, he moved to Massachusetts General Hospital (MGH), where he was the founding Director of the MGH-HMS Center for Nervous System Repair (2002–2011), and Professor of Neurology [Neuroscience].

In 2004, Macklis was the founding Program Head of the Neuroscience / Nervous System Diseases Program at the Harvard Stem Cell Institute at Harvard University, which he directed until 2013.

In 2007, Macklis was appointed Professor of Stem Cell and Regenerative Biology at Harvard University, in both the Faculty of Arts and Sciences and Harvard Medical School, physically based on the main Harvard University campus in Cambridge, Massachusetts. In 2014, He was appointed the Max and Anne Wien Professor of Life Sciences, Harvard University, in the department of Stem Cell and Regenerative Biology, and Center for Brain Science. He is a faculty member of the Harvard graduate programs in Neuroscience; Biological and Biomedical Sciences; Developmental and Regenerative Biology; and Molecules, Cells, and Organisms; The Harvard-M.I.T. M.D.-Ph.D. Program; and the Harvard-MIT Division of Health Sciences and Technology

Macklis was awarded a Kleberg Foundation predoctoral fellowship, a Leopold Schepp Foundation Scholarship, and an NIH K08 transition to independence award. He was a Rita Allen Foundation Scholar. He was awarded an NIH Director's Innovation Award. He was awarded a Jacob Javits Award in the Neurosciences and MERIT Award from NINDS in 2004. Macklis became a Brain Research Foundation Fellow in 2015, and an Allen Distinguished Investigator of the Paul G. Allen Frontiers Group in 2015. He became a Simons Foundation Autism Research Initiative (SFARI) investigator in 2017. He was awarded an NIH Director's Pioneer Award in 2017. He was named an Oxford Martin School Visiting Fellow at University of Oxford and St. John's College, and a Plumer Fellow at St. Anne's College 2022-2023.

== Research ==
The Macklis laboratory is directed toward both 1) understanding molecular controls and mechanisms over neuron subtype development neural development, diversity, axon guidance-circuit formation-growth cone biology, and degeneration-disease in the cerebral cortex cerebral cortex[e.g. corticospinal neurons (CSN) in motor neuron disease (ALS, HSPs, PLS), and associative circuitry in autism (ASD) and intellectual disability], and 2) applying developmental controls toward both brain and spinal cord regeneration and developmentally-directed adult neurogenesis[e.g. CSN circuitry that degenerates in ALS-MND, and whose injury is central to loss of motor function in spinal cord injury] and directed differentiation for in vitro mechanistic modeling using human assembloids.

The lab focuses on neocortical projection neuron development and subtype specification in mice and human neuron models; new approaches to subtype-specific axonal growth cone biology; neural progenitor / “stem cell” biology; induction of adult neurogenesis (the birth of new neurons); and directed neuronal subtype differentiation and core long-distance circuit formation via molecular manipulation of endogenous neural progenitors and pluripotent cells (ES/iPS). The same biology informs understanding of neuronal specificity of vulnerability in human neurodegenerative and developmental diseases. Relationships and application of cortical development to evolution, disease, and regeneration are frequent themes. https://macklislab.hscrb.harvard.edu/

The Macklis laboratory has made major contributions to several areas and neuroscience fields. A central contribution of the lab’s early work was in the area of cellular CNS / neocortical circuit repair by transplantation of immature neocortical neurons and neural precursors. In the CNS repair field before, there was focus on tissue block “grafts” or heterotopic cells without neuronal migration or integration, with assumption that integration in post-development CNS (cortex especially) was not possible. Macklis developed an approach of noninvasive, optically-biophysically-targeted, population-specific apoptotic neuronal degeneration, via exogenous long-wavelength chromophore targeting to specific populations by retrograde transport. This enabled investigation of transplantation of developmentally primed and appropriate immature neurons, with integration into new synaptic space, mimicking adult neurogenesis in dentate gyrus and olfactory bulb.

In 2000, the Macklis lab published the first two reports of “induction of neurogenesis”, a contribution that is credited with starting this new subfield. They were first to manipulate endogenous neural progenitors/precursors/“stem cells” in situ (adult mouse) to undergo induced neurogenesis in “non-neurogenic” cortex; demonstrated that newborn neurons progressively migrate, differentiate layer- and region-specifically, and some extend appropriate long-distance projections, with re-formation de novo of targeted, degenerated circuitry in adult mouse cortex to thalamus and spinal cord. In collaborative work, the lab induced behaviorally functional neurogenesis in situ in zebrafinch from endogenous progenitors. The lab published the first identification of function of adult-born mouse neurons (in olfactory bulb)– they uniquely provide a form of synaptic plasticity at cellular level, undergoing response enhancement to novel odorant stimuli (experience-dependent modification) during a critical period, implicating them in olfactory learning, not simply as “replacement cells”.

In a linked set of major contributions, the Macklis lab first invented and developed now widely-used approaches to isolate, protect, and FACS purify healthy mouse cortical projection neurons of multiple subtypes at developmentally distinct critical stages, uniquely enabling investigation of subtype- and stage-specific controls over survival, differentiation, axon growth, circuitry formation. This was previously thought impossible, due to neuronal axotomy/dendritotomy. The lab employed this neuronal FACS first for studies of subtype-specific cell biology and context-specific peptide growth factor regulation of diverse projection neurons.

They then identified a set of combinatorially and sequentially interacting molecular controls (largely transcriptional regulators) that direct subtype-specific specification, development, and diversity of projection neurons (in particular, corticospinal, callosal, corticothalamic, corticostriatal, and diverse sub-subtypes with unique circuitry). This FACS-based neuronal purification for transcriptional analysis of small homogeneous samples of multiple subtypes of projection neurons at critical developmental stages enabled addressing major questions re: dynamic and combinatorially interacting molecular developmental controls over subtype-specific development/diversity of distinct subtypes. Early in this work, the lab identified and functionally investigated Ctip2/Bcl11b, Fezl/Fezf2, Sox5, Bhlhb5, Lmo4, RORb, Sox6, Ctip1/Bcl11a, Fog2, and a number of other widely known controls over neuron subtype and area specification in mammalian cerebral cortex.

Later portions of this work opened up new thinking in cortical development and regenerative reprogramming, with the first reports of postmitotic regulation of neuronal identity, then of acquisition of precise areal identity, then target-specific axon outgrowth and multi-projection connectivity. This is in contrast to previous views that neuronal differentiation was decided by progenitors just before giving rise to postmitotic neurons. The lab has put forward a theoretical model of a multi-stage, nested "Boolean" “molecular logic” of progenitor- and post-mitotic, areally specific, combinatorial molecular controls over precise development of key cortical and other forebrain projection neuron types. Together, the work has contributed to understanding development, organization, function, and evolution of cortical circuitry, and toward directed differentiation of progenitors or ES/iPS, regeneration, reprogramming, induced neurogenesis, and identification of disease genes.

More recently, the Macklis lab pioneered subcellular molecular investigation of immensely polarized projection neurons (length 103-105 X soma diameter) and their local TF-regulated growth cone and synapse RNA and protein molecular machinery that implements subtype-, circuit-specific brain “wiring” and unique cell biology, then functions in developing synapses, likely in synapse maintenance, function, and dysfunction. They invented subtype-specific fluorescent small particle sorting (FSPS), building on the lab's early development of neuronal FACS. They developed new experimental and analytic approaches for quantitative, comprehensive, high-throughput “subcellular RNA-proteome mapping”, & ultra-low-input proteomics, and nanoRibo-seq for investigation of subcellular translational regulation.

https://www.ncbi.nlm.nih.gov/sites/myncbi/jeffrey.macklis.1/bibliography/41149183/public/?sort=date&direction=descending

== See also ==
- Adult neurogenesis
- Neurodegeneration
- Neuroregeneration
- Spinal cord injury research
