= Alexandros Makriyannis =

American researcher into cannabinoids

Alexandros Makriyannis (born September 9, 1939) is an American biochemist and professor of chemistry and chemical biology in the department of medicinal chemistry at Northeastern University in Boston, Massachusetts, where he directs the Center for Drug Discovery and holds the George Behrakis Chair of Pharmaceutical Biotechnology. His research has focused on the biochemical basis of the endocannabinoid system and on the development of synthetic cannabinoids.

== Scientific career ==
Makriyannis studied chemistry at the University of Cairo. He then earned his Ph.D. in medicinal chemistry at the University of Kansas and went on to research synthetic organic chemistry at the University of California, Berkeley. He worked at Smith, Kline & French Laboratories and Tufts Medical School and then at the University of Connecticut, where he was later appointed Distinguished Professor of Medicinal Chemistry and Professor of Molecular and Cell Biology and Pharmacology. He moved to Northeastern University in 2005.

Makriyannis is director of the Center for Drug Discovery at Northeastern University, which he founded in 2005. His work has identified the structure of cannabinoid receptors in the brain, helping to elucidate the psychoactive properties of some of these substances and to point towards modifications in the receptors so as to retain the positive effects of cannabinoids while eliminating the negative ones. These studies have informed the development by Makriyannis and his collaborators of synthetic compounds with a view to their use as cannabinergic probes or as medications in drug addiction and in obesity and metabolic disorders. A more recent research interest has been the study of drug interactions with protein targets in membranes. His research has been reported in over 470 publications and his group has filed more than 40 patents.

Subsequent novel inventions include:

2008 “Heteroaryl Urea Compounds as Endocannablnold enzyme Deactivators and a Method of Their Evaluation” – A. Makriyannis, L. Pandarinathan, N. Zvonok, T. Pakkari, L. Chapman

2011 “Method of Developing Cannabinoids with Controlled Duration of Action and Uses Thereof” – A. Makriyannis, G.A Thakur, R. Sharma

2011 “Cannabinergic Resorcinol Analogs” – A. Makriyannis, S. Bajaj, M.R D’Souza, S. Nikas, G. Thakur

2012 “Novel Cannabinerglc Nitrate Esters and Related Analogs” – A. Makriyannis, V.K. Vemuri

2014 Novel urea and carbamates FAAH MAGL or dual FAAH/MAGL inhibitors and their uses thereof” – A. Makriyannis, V.G. Shukla, S.O. Alapafuja

2014 “N·Acylethanolamlne Hydrolyzing Acid Amldase (NAAA) Inhibitors and Their Use Thereof” – A. Makriyannis, M. Malamas, K.V Subramanian, K. Whitten, N. Zvonok, J.M West, S. Pavlopoulos

2017 “Carbarnates ABHD6 and dual ABHD6/MGL Inhibitors and their use thereof”- A. Makriyannis, M. Malamas, M. Lamani, S.I Farah

== Biotechnology Startups ==
Makriyannis has founded two biotechnology startups in Burlington, MA dedicated to bringing new and innovative drugs to the market place for human diseases that can be modulated by the endocannabinoid system:

- MAKScientific (2004)
- PafosPharma (2017)

== Awards ==
- McNeil Endowment Fellowship (1964–67)
- Research Scientist Award, NIDA (1990–95, 1995-2000)
- Fellow, American Association for the Advancement of Science (1993)
- President, International Cannabinoid Research Society (ICRS) (1993)
- Distinguished Scientist Award, University of Connecticut Alumni (1996)
- Fellow, American Association of Pharmaceutical Sciences (1997)
- National Institute of Health MERIT Awards (1997-2007, 2007-2017)
- Senior Scientist NIDA Award (2000-2011)
- Distinguished professor, University of Connecticut, Board of Trustees (2002)
- Research Achievement Award in Drug Design and Discovery, American Association of
- Pharmaceutical Scientists (AAPS) (2002)
- Behrakis Trustee Chair in Pharmaceutical Biotechnology, Northeastern University (2004)
- Honorary Doctorate of Philosophy, University of Athens, Greece (2005)
- Recognition of Scholarly or Creative Work by Northeastern Faculty and Staff, Northeastern University (2005)
- Mechoulam Life Achievement Award in Cannabinoid Research (ICRS) (2006)
- Distinguished Patent Award, University of Connecticut (2007)
- Kenneth E. Avis Award in Medicinal Chemistry (2007)
- Marquis Who's Who in Science and Engineering (2007)
- ACS Research Lifetime Achievement Award in Medicinal Chemistry (2012)
- Annual NU Award for Excellence in Research and Creativity (2012)
- ACS Medicinal Chemistry Hall of Fame (2013)
- Highly Cited Researcher, Thomson Reuters (2014)
- Distinguished professor, Northeastern University (2015)
- AAPS Distinguished Pharmaceutical Scientist Award (2015)
- Honorary Doctorate of Philosophy, University of Crete Medical School, Greece (2018)
- CPDD Nathan B. Eddy Memorial Award (2018)

== See also ==
- List of AM cannabinoids
