= New York Stem Cell Foundation =

Nonprofit scientific research institute

The New York Stem Cell Foundation
- Formation: 2005
- Founder: Susan L. Solomon, Mary Elizabeth Bunzel
- Type: Non-profit Research Institute
- Headquarters: New York City
- CEO: Lon Cardon, Ph.D., FMedSci
- Website: https://www.jax.org/nyscf

The New York Stem Cell Foundation, or NYSCF, is an American non-profit research institute focused on stem cell research, technology development, and funding researchers. Headquartered on the far west side of Manhattan, New York, NYSCF employs 114 scientists, technicians, engineers, and administrative and other staff, in addition to funding early career investigators and postdoctoral fellows. Since its inception, NYSCF has raised and invested more than $400 million for stem cell research. It was acquired by The Jackson Laboratory in October 2025.

== Organization ==
=== History ===
NYSCF was founded in New York City by Susan L. Solomon, a lawyer and entrepreneur, and Mary Elizabeth Bunzel, a former journalist, in 2005 to accelerate stem cell-based approaches to researching and treating type 1 diabetes and in response to the refusal of the administration of President George W. Bush to make a major investment in stem cell research. In 2006, NYSCF opened the NYSCF Research Institute – a 500 square foot, one-room independent laboratory located adjacent to Columbia University – as a safe-haven to conduct somatic cell nuclear transfer research through a collaboration with Columbia University and Harvard University.

In 2015, NYSCF signed a 20-year lease to move its headquarters and NYSCF Research Institute laboratories to a renovated 42,000 square foot space at 619 West 54th Street in the former Warner Brothers 'Movie Lab' building, rebranded as the Hudson Research Center by commercial real estate developer and building owner Taconic. Opened in 2017, the new headquarters includes space for a Good Manufacturing Practice facility to manufacture cells for clinical trials. In 2021, New York City announced it would grant NYSCF $6.5M as one of four applied research and development (R&D) facilities to equip an expansion of its Research Institute.

=== Corporate leadership and acquisition ===
Since the 2025 acquisition by JAX and creation of the JAX-NYSCF Collaborative, the organization is currently led by Lon Cardon, President and CEO of The Jackson Laboratory.

== Research ==
=== High-throughput technologies ===
In 2015, NYSCF described the development of the NYSCF Global Stem Cell Array, a fully-automated system for high-throughput creation, differentiation, and quality control of stem cell lines. The system saves five to six times the cost of reagents as compared to manual stem cell derivation. The Global Stem Cell Array has been used to conduct research on several patient groups including children with rare diseases, veterans with post-traumatic stress disorder, and Parkinson’s patients.

=== Stem cell-based research ===
NYSCF research resulting in the first human stem cell lines from the cells of patients with amyotrophic lateral sclerosis (ALS), commonly known as Lou Gehrig’s disease, was named as Time magazine's top medical breakthrough of 2008 and the number one breakthrough of the year by Science magazine. In 2018, a phase 2 clinical trial for Ezogabine, an epilepsy treatment identified as a possible ALS therapy based on this human stem cell model, was shown to reduce motor neuron excitability in ALS patients.

In 2013, NYSCF researchers created the first patient-specific bone from stem cells and successfully transplanted the grafts into mice.

NYSCF researchers created stem cells and derived neurons from a pair of identical twins, one with Parkinson’s disease and one without, finding their neurons differed in how they produce the neurotransmitter dopamine and the enzyme beta-glucocerebrosidase in addition to differing in a molecular signaling pathway.

NYSCF researchers, in collaboration with researchers at New York University, created astrocytes from human stem cells and showed that in disease-like environments these cells can turn into neuron killers.

=== Mitochondrial replacement therapy ===
NYSCF researchers developed mitochondrial replacement therapy in 2012, or MRT, a technique to prevent the mother-to-child transmission of mitochondrial diseases which is now approved for clinical use in the United Kingdom.

=== Artificial intelligence ===
With Google Research, NYSCF scientists used the NYSCF Array and artificial intelligence algorithms to identify new cellular features of Parkinson’s disease by analyzing over six million images of skin cells, sampled and expanded from a group of 91 Parkinson’s patients and healthy controls.

=== Partnerships ===
Organizations NYSCF has or is currently partnering with include: Google; the Icahn School of Medicine at Mount Sinai, the James J. Peters Veterans Affairs Medical Center, and Yale University School of Medicine; Rush University Medical Center, Harvard Medical School, and Brigham and Women’s Hospital; Johns Hopkins School of Medicine and Bloomberg Philanthropies; and Columbia University Medical Center and the National Eye Institute.

== Activism ==
NYSCF started a working group "Initiative on Women in Science and Engineering" (IWISE) to address gender equality in science and STEM fields. The IWISE working group published seven actionable strategies for institutions to promote gender equity in a 2015 Cell Stem Cell paper. One of these steps is an Institutional Report Card for Gender Equality, which NYSCF created and requires every NYSCF grant applicant to fill out. The results of a 5-year analysis of these report card submissions were published in a 2019 Cell Stem Cell paper defining the extent of gender parity issues in the academic pipeline and opportunities for improvement.

== Funding ==
NYSCF was founded with private philanthropy from individuals and foundations. Notable early funders include former New York City mayor Michael R. Bloomberg; the investor Stanley Druckenmiller and his wife, Fiona; and a foundation founded by the late hedge-fund manager Julian Robertson.

NYSCF hosts an annual fundraising Gala and Science Fair. Past honorees include Janet and Jerry Zucker, Sanjay Gupta, MD; Siddhartha Mukherjee, MD, DPhil; Irving Weissman, MD; Susan and Stephen Scherr; Victor Garber; Derrick Rossi, PhD; Kizzmekia Corbett, PhD; Barney Graham, MD, PhD; Katalin Karikó, PhD; Drew Weissman, MD, PhD; Brooke Ellison; Frank Gehry; and David Rockwell. In 2021 and 2020, NYSCF held virtual Galas both directed by Scott Ellis and hosted by Sanjay Gupta, MD.

In addition to philanthropy, NYSCF also receives funding from grants, partnerships, and collaborations.

== Awards ==
Several awards are administered by the NYSCF. The Robertson Early Career Investigator Awards are given to scientists who have recently launched their own laboratories and provides unrestricted funding over a five-year period to scientists around the world, funded by the Robertson Foundation since 2010. The Druckenmiller Postdoctoral Fellows Awards provide three years of unrestricted funding to postdoctoral stem cell researchers in the tri-state area of New York, New Jersey and Connecticut, and are funded by Stanley and Fiona Druckenmiller.

Notable recipients of NYSCF awards include Feng Zhang, Edward Boyden, Jayaraj Rajagopal, Paola Arlotta, Valentina Greco Lydia W. S. Finley, Shruti Naik, Lauren Orefice, Lauren O’Connell, Elaine Hsiao, Carolyn (Lindy) McBride, Paul J. Tesar, Vanessa Ruta, Edward Chang, Lisa Giocomo, Kay Tye, Dragana Rogulja, Maria Lehtinen, Claire Wyart, Sergiu P. Pașca, Ilana B. Witten, Franziska Michor, and Amy Wagers.
