= Antonio J. Giraldez =

Spanish-American developmental biologist

Antonio Jesus Giraldez (born 1975) is a Spanish developmental biologist and RNA researcher at Yale University School of Medicine, where he serves as chair of the department of genetics and Fergus F. Wallace Professor of Genetics. He is also affiliated with the Yale Cancer Center and the Yale Stem Cell Center.

Giraldez specializes in understanding how a newly fertilized egg transforms into a highly-functioning, complex animal. This is a critical period in embryonic development and many of the pathways and molecules that drive this transformation are shared across animal species. Giraldez uses zebrafish as a model system, because it can be easily manipulated and visualized, and because the genetic tools to unlock its secrets are very sophisticated. When an egg is fertilized, it must shut down the maternal signals that maintain its identity and activate a new program to become a healthy zygote, which in turn can develop into a fully-fledged adult. Giraldez has contributed to characterizing the shift that occurs after the embryo interprets and shuts down the maternal program and activates the developmental program contained in its own genome.

Giraldez's work has wide implications for understanding developmental genetics in humans and other species, advancing RNA biology, and exploring the activation of embryonic cells in health and disease. He has been named a Howard Hughes Faculty Scholar and a Pew Scholar in Biomedical Sciences. In addition, he has received the Blavatnik Award for Young Scientists (National Finalist), the Vilcek Prize for Creative Promise in Biomedical Science and the John Kendrew Young Scientist Award from the European Molecular Biology Laboratory (EMBL).

== Early life and education ==
Born in 1975 in Jerez de la Frontera, Spain, Giraldez attended high school at La Salle Buen Pastor, in Jerez de la Frontera, Spain. He followed on with studies in Chemistry and Molecular Biology at the University of Cadiz and the University Autonoma of Madrid. As an undergraduate, he worked with Ginés Morata at the Centro de Biologia Molecular Severo Ochoa (CBMSO) in Madrid. Giraldez completed his PhD with Stephen Cohen at the European Molecular Biology Laboratory (EMBL, Heidelberg, 1998–2002), followed by postdoctoral studies with Alexander Schier at the Skirball Institute (NYU) and Harvard (2003–2006).

== Career ==
He established his laboratory at Yale in 2007, became director of graduate studies in 2012, and left that position to become chair the genetics department in 2017, where he is now the Fergus F. Wallace Professor of Genetics.

=== Research ===
Giraldez began his career at the Centro de Biologia Molecular Severo Ochoa (CBMSO) in Madrid, working on the development of Drosophila under the mentorship of Ginés Morata. He then moved to the EMBL to study the mechanisms of development of the Drosophila wing under the mentorship of Stephen Cohen. Giraldez identified the gene Notum, so called because it caused duplication of the notum region upon overexpression in the wing primordium. He discovered that Notum encodes a secreted inhibitor that reduces the local concentration of an important developmental signaling molecule known as Wingless.

During his postdoctoral career at the Skirball Institute (NYU) and Harvard with Alexander Schier, Giraldez investigated the role of microRNAs and the microRNA processing machinery Dicer in vertebrate embryonic development. Giraldez's studies of mRNA and embryonic microRNAs led to fundamental insights into the mechanisms by which a maternal cell transitions to a self-regulating zygote, a process known as the maternal to zygotic transition (MZT). During MZT, zygotic genome activation regulates maternal mRNAs, but the molecular effectors of this regulation were a mystery. Giraldez and collaborators identified a conserved microRNA, miR-430 which represses, deadenylates, and clears ≈20% of maternal mRNAs2. MiR-430 is a large microRNA family that is conserved in other vertebrates: miR-427 in Xenopus and miR-290-295/302 in mouse and humans. This work, which was reported in the journal Science in 2005 and 2006, revealed the importance of miRNAs generally in different aspects of embryonic development and revealed a novel mechanism of miRNA-mediated regulation known as deadenylation. In 2012, Giraldez led a study showing how miR-430 reduces translation before causing mRNA decay, which was again published in Science. Giraldez's work on miR-430 has opened a new area of research in the field of developmental genetics.

When Giraldez established his laboratory at Yale he continued to investigate the regulatory code that shapes embryonic development, using zebrafish as a model. In the early days of his laboratory he discovered a new mechanism of microRNA processing independent of Dicer that requires the catalytic activity of Argonaute 2, a type of Argonaute protein. This pathway is required to process miR-451 in vertebrates to regulate development and cellular responses to stress during hematopoiesis. His work also defined hundreds of targets for different microRNAs during embryonic development, demonstrating that microRNAs can shape gene expression patterns in space and time

The Giraldez laboratory has applied genomic approaches to understand translation regulation during development. Using ribosome footprinting, the lab has identified novel, translated genes that encode micropeptides, one of which regulates cell motility in embryogenesis as shown by the Alexander Schier and Bruno Reversade laboratories. Through further analysis of translation, Giraldez's work uncovered an important role for codon composition and translation in regulating mRNA stability during the maternal-to-zygotic transition across different species. This regulatory layer must be conserved, based on its previous discovery in yeast by the Jeff Coller laboratory. Giraldez's work established the concept that mRNAs can have differential stability dependent on the codon composition and tRNA availability and showed the importance of regulating mRNA levels during cellular transitions and homeostasis.

Further work in the Giraldez laboratory has explored the mechanisms of zygotic genome activation after fertilization. His lab identified a set of transcription factors that enabled activation of miR-430 and a large fraction of the genome after fertilization: maternal Nanog, Oct4 and SoxB1. Some of these factors are involved in stem cell maintenance and cellular reprogramming. These findings offer a new understanding of how the genome becomes activated, linking cellular and developmental reprogramming.

Giraldez's current work involves deciphering the post-transcriptional regulatory code during development and the regulation of cellular differentiation in the zygote. In 2018, Giraldez delivered a Keynote Lecture as part of Cold Spring Harbor Laboratory's Leading Strand Series, which can be viewed online here.

=== Professional activities ===
Giraldez has served on several major review committees. In addition to being a permanent member of the NIH Dev1 Study Section, he has served on the Pew Scholars Alumni Review Board and the Damon Runyon Cancer Research Foundation Fellowship Awards Committee.

== Awards and honors ==
- HHMI Faculty Scholar (2016–2021)
- Blavatnik Award for Young Scientists National Finalist (2016)
- Vilcek Prize for Creative Promise in Biomedical Science (2014)
- Pew Scholar in Biomedical Sciences (2008)
- NYAS Blavatnik Young Investigator Award Finalist (2007)
- John Kendrew Young investigator Award (2007)
- Lois E. and Franklin H. Top, Jr., Yale Scholar Award (2007)

== Personal life ==
Giraldez is married to fellow faculty member Valentina Greco.
