= Shruti Naik =

Indian American scientist

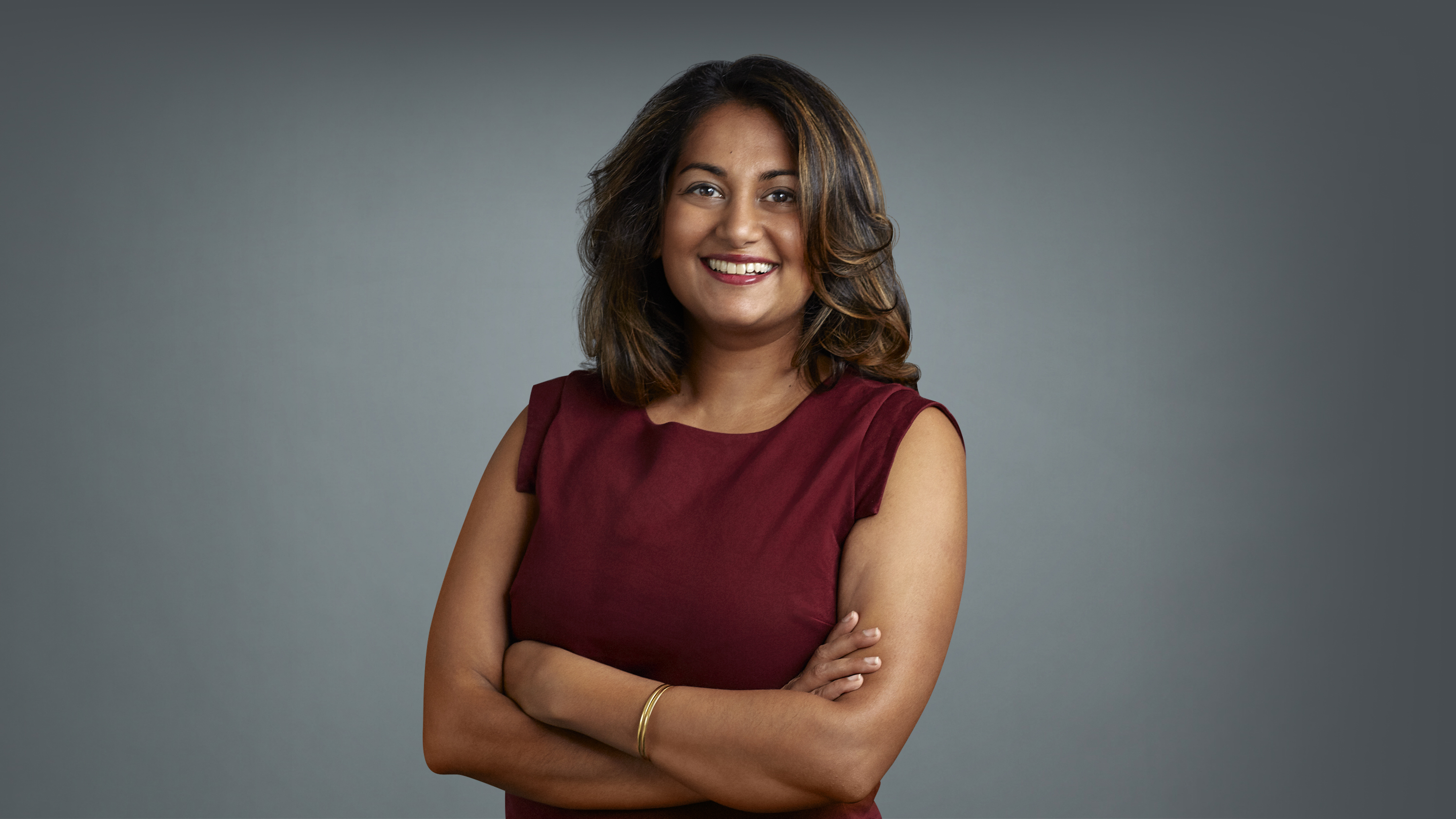
- Education: University of Pennsylvania; Rockefeller University; University of Maryland, College Park
- Scientific career
- Workplaces: Icahn School of Medicine at Mount Sinai
- Thesis: Host-commensal cross talk at the cutaneous interface (2012)
- Doctoral advisor: Yasmine Belkaid

Shruti Naik is an Indian American scientist whose research focuses on immunology and adult stem cell biology. She is a Professor of Immunology and Immunotherapy, Dermatology, and Institute of Regenerative Medicine and Director of the Colton Center for Autoimmunity at Icahn School of Medicine at Mount Sinai. Her lab integrates approaches from the fields of immunology, microbiology, stem cell biology, and regenerative medicine with imaging and sequencing technologies to investigate mechanisms underlying autoimmune and inflammatory diseases.

Her accolades include the Regeneron Prize for Creative Innovation, L'Oréal-UNESCO For Women in Science Award, the 2018 regional Blavatnik Awards for Young Scientists, and the International Takeda Innovator in Regeneration Award. Naik was named a Packard Fellow for her research into the molecular mechanisms that underpin the function of tissue stem cells. She has also received the NIH Director's New Innovator Award and been named a Pew-Stewart Scholar and a New York Stem Cell Foundation Robertson Investigator. Most recently, she was awarded the LEO Foundation Award.

== Early life and education ==
Naik was born in India and moved to America at the age of twelve. Naik dealt with the culture shock through humor and aspired to be a stand-up comedian. As a highschool student, Naik watched a PBS special on Dr. Bonnie Bassler, a biologist at Princeton University, who was working on quorum sensing mechanisms that make bacteria glow. After watching Bassler on television, Naik decided she wanted to learn more about glow in the dark bacteria and enrolled in a microbiology course .

Naik was an undergraduate student at the University of Maryland, College Park, where she majored in cell and molecular biology. During this time, Naik worked in the Food and Drug Administration laboratory on identifying microbes responsible for food-related outbreaks. After graduating, Naik was a research technician Naval Medical Research Center, where she supported research on immune responses to traumatic brain injury.

Naik earned her PhD at the University of Pennsylvania under the supervision of Dr. Yasmine Belkaid and Julie Segre. She was a Damon Runyon Cancer Research postdoctoral fellow in the laboratory of Dr. Elaine Fuchs at Rockefeller University.

== Career and research ==
Naik studies how the immune system maintains the health of our tissues and organs over our lifetime. Naik is interested in the organs that interface with the external environment, including the skin, lungs, and gut. She has investigated inflammation and tissue regeneration, host-microbe interactions, and inflammatory diseases. Her research has included studies identifying that commensal microbes are necessary for proper developmental and function of the skin immune system, showing that skin stem cells can sense inflammation and exhibit inflammatory memory, and identifying new immunological factors that control cellular adaptation to hypoxia in wound repair. Her laboratory studies inflammatory diseases such as psoriasis and inflammatory bowel disease, to develop therapies that not only curb inflammation but restore tissue health.

Naik has received grant funding from many organizations, including National Institutes of Health, Pew Charitable Trusts, The David and Lucile Packard Foundation, Kenneth Rainin Foundation, New York Stem Cell Foundation, National Psoriasis Foundation, and LEO Foundation. She is currently on the Scientific Advisory Board of Keystone Symposia. In 2024, Naik was elected to serve as a Board Director for the Society for Investigative Dermatology.

Research on skin microbiota and immunity

Naik's graduate research focused on the interactions between skin commensals and resident immune cells, and their role in cutaneous immunity. She found that indigenous microbes co-opt tissue-specific modes of interacting with the host to direct immune cell function in the skin. She subsequently reported that certain commensal species are able to elicit a unique subset of IL-17A-producing CD8 T cells (Tc17s), indicating that sustaining complex communities of commensals is necessary to maintain a diverse repertoire of immune function. She then mapped the dendritic cell subsets necessary to sense commensals and induce long-term Tc17s. This host - microbe dialogue takes place in the absence of overt inflammation in healthy skin. Therefore, these studies revealed a homeostatic immune response that is continuously calibrating barrier immunity to commensal signals.

Disease Memory in long-lived cells

Naik's research on skin stem cells identified how the skin 'remembers' injuries and exposure to irritants, finding that the long-lived epithelial stem cells in the skin encode a 'memory' or retain molecular changes associated with prior inflammatory stimuli. Repeated exposure can change the genetic landscape of stem cells, accelerating their response to subsequent inflammatory stimuli. This response can be beneficial, allowing for faster healing of wounds, or can be damaging and exacerbate inflammatory skin diseases such as psoriasis. Naik's group also uncovered how such memory of skin disease can influence long-lived blood stem cells. Naik continues this work to investigate how different cell types in complex tissues retain this molecular 'memory' of past inflammation and how these changes influence health and disease.

Immunity in tissue repair and inflammatory disease

Research from the Naik lab has examined how the immune system enables cells to adapt to hypoxia, immune-tissue crosstalk in regeneration and repair processes, spatial transcriptomics for stratification of psoriasis severity, and approaches in regenerative medicine. Naik's findings on hypoxia challenged previous models suggesting that hypoxia is sufficient to cell-autonomously induce HIF1α-mediated adaptation. The study found a secondary signal from repair-associated immune cells was required to activate HIF1α in the presence of hypoxia. Naik's work to understand how inflammatory factors fuel tissue repair is relevant to understanding disease states that are driven by immune-mediated tissue damage. This work may inform research into regenerative therapies for inflammatory and infectious disease that repair tissue. Naik later showed that, during early life, a specialized type of dendritic cell in the skin can directly activate IL-17-producing γδ T cells in response to allergens, identifying a developmental mechanism by which neuroendocrine maturation influences increased risk of inflammatory allergic reactions with age.

== Science outreach ==
Naik has spoken on not only her goals as a scientist ("discovery and bettering human health"), but also the importance of making science more accessible to the world. Naik is a staunch advocate for science and has participated in scientific outreach, mentorship, and advocacy for women and other underrepresented groups in STEM. She has appeared on NBC, NPR's Inflection Point, Forbes Magazine, and WIRED. She has also been a panelist at several seminars focusing on career development and institutional barriers and mentors trainees and researchers at various stages of their career, including high school student visitors, undergraduate trainees, doctoral candidates, postdoctoral fellows, professional researchers, and faculty.

In an interview with NBC, Naik discussed challenges she experienced as a woman of color in science, including being one of few people from similar backgrounds in professional settings, and emphasized the value of diversity in scientific research.

Naik is an Executive Producer of "The Endless Frontier", a feature-length documentary that follows three scientists and examines the scientific, institutional and funding challenges facing biomedical research.

== Awards and honors ==
- 2015 Regeneron Pharmaceuticals Regeneron Prize for Creative Innovation
- 2016 L'Oréal-UNESCO For Women in Science Award
- 2018 Blavatnik Awards for Young Scientists
- 2018 Nature Research Awards Finalist
- 2018 Damon Runyon Dale F. Frey Award for Breakthrough Scientists
- 2018 Tri-Institution Breakout Award
- 2019 Takeda Awards Innovators in Science Award Early Career Winner
- 2019 Skin Cancer Foundation, Dr. Marcia Robbins-Wilf Research Award
- 2020 Packard Fellow
- 2020 Pew Stewart Fellow
- 2020 NIH DP2 Innovator Award
- 2021 The Kenneth Rainin Foundation New Innovator Award
- 2021 International Cytokine and Interferon Society Regeneron New Investigator Award
- 2021 New York Stem Cell Foundation Robertson Stem Cell Investigator
- 2023 Irma Hirschl-Weill-Caulier Career Scientist Award
- 2023 Cold Spring Harbor Laboratory WiSE McClintock Award
- 2023 Burroughs Wellcome Fund PATH Forward Award
- 2024 LEO Foundation Award
- 2024 AMP AIM Leadership Scholar
