= NIH Director's New Innovator Award =

Research award in the United States

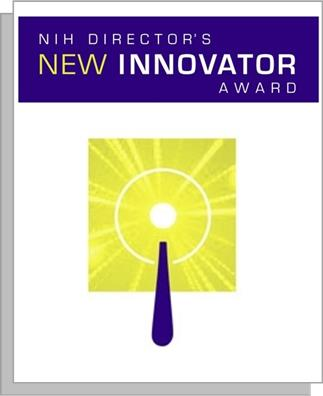
- Awarded for: The high risk, high reward research funding mechanism of NIH awarded to newly independent scientists.
- Country: United States
- Presented by: National Institutes of Health
- Reward: $2.3M to research institution
- First award: 2007
- Website: https://commonfund.nih.gov/newinnovator

National Institutes of Health Director's New Innovator Award is a research initiative first announced in 2007 designed to support exceptionally creative, early-career investigators who propose innovative, high-impact projects. The focus is specifically on "innovative" research that has a potential to produce paradigm shifting results. The Award is for $300,000 (direct cost) per year for five years.

The NIH Director's New Innovator Award has one of the lowest "success rates" of all NIH funding mechanism. In 2014 only the National Institutes of Health Director's Pioneer Award had a lower "success rate." During the evaluation process each New Innovator application is reviewed and scored independently by three external reviewers. NIA program leadership then rank the applications by averaging the Overall Scores, and the highest scored applications are considered finalists. The finalist applications are then scored by a second set of reviewers, and are ranked once more by program leadership using the second set of scores. The final ranking is then sent to the NIH Director as a recommendation for funding.

== Notable awardees ==
- Pardis Sabeti

== Other recipients ==
- Murat Acar
- Erez Lieberman Aiden
- Michael Beyeler
- Parijat Bhatnagar
- Alistair Boettiger
- Gemma Carvill
- Michelle M. Chan
- Jerry Chen
- Sidi Chen
- Nicolas Chevrier
- Eun Ji Chung
- Brian Cobb
- Bianxiao Cui
- Subhamoy Dasgupta
- Megan Dennis
- Fangyuan Ding
- Zoe Donaldson
- Sergei Doulatov
- Rachel Dutton
- Katherine Ehrlich
- Luisa Escobar-Hoyos
- Lucas Farnung
- Alison Feder
- Evan Feinberg
- Fleur M. Ferguson
- Yvette Fisher
- Stephen Floor
- Kendra Frederick
- Akhilesh K. Gaharwar
- Daniel Gallego-Perez
- Charles Gawad
- Luke Gilbert
- Aaron Gitler
- Yiyang Gong
- Reyna Gordon
- Thomas Guerrero
- Junjie Guo
- Rizal Hariadi
- Wendy Henderson
- Jun Huang
- Rajan Jain
- Matthew Kayser
- Justin Kim
- Kevin King
- Ester Kwon
- Dan Landau
- Changyang Linghu
- Shixin Liu
- Po-Ru Loh
- Lara Mahal
- Emanual Maverakis
- Carolyn McBride
- Prashand Mishra
- Michael Mitchell
- Darcie Moore
- Medha Pathak
- Priya Rajasethupathy
- Srivatsam Raman
- Jeremy Rock
- Kole Roybal
- Warren Ruder
- Nasia Safdar
- Manish Saggar
- Tiffany Scharschmidt
- Johannes Schoeneberg
- Mark Sheffield
- James Shorter
- Nikolai Slavov
- Ellen Sletten
- Sabrina Spencer
- Nicholas Stephanopoulos
- Michael Tadross
- Luke Theogarajan
- Denis Titov
- Raju Tomer
- Carlos Ernesto Vargas-Irwin
- Shigeki Watanabe
- Leor Weinberger
- Amy Wesolowski
- Kathryn Whitehead
- Erik Wright
- Sean Wu
- Ke Xu
- Naoki Yamanaka
- Sarah Zanders
- Yongxin (Leon) Zhao
- Haining Zhong
