= Dan Peer =

Israeli researcher

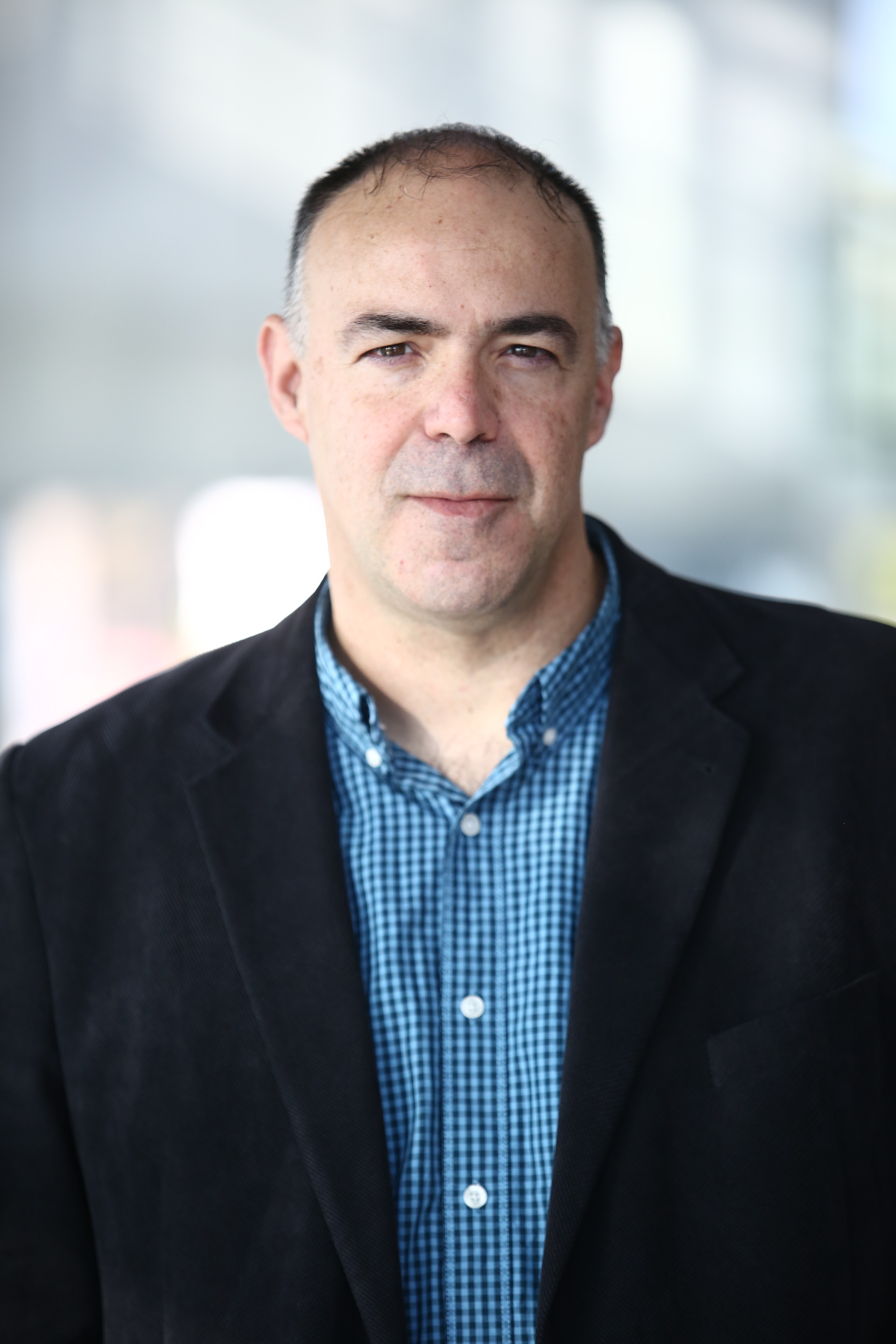
Portrait of Dan Peer

Dan Peer (Hebrew: דן פאר; born July 19, 1972) is a Professor and the Director of the Laboratory of Precision NanoMedicine at Tel Aviv University (TAU). He was also the Vice President for Research and Development at TAU between 2020–2026. In 2017 he co-founded and acts as the managing director of SPARK Tel Aviv, Center for Translational Medicine. From 2016–2020 he was the chair of the TAU Cancer Biology Research Center.

Peer is a past President of the Israeli Chapter of the Controlled Release Society. He was elected to the Israel Young Academy of Science. He is an elected Member of the National Academy of Engineering (USA), and a Fellow of the National Academy of Inventors (USA) and the Controlled Release Society.

== Research work ==
Peer pioneered the field of active cellular targeting of RNA payloads into specific cell types. His lab was among the first to demonstrate immunomodulation through a systemic delivery of RNA-loaded targeted nanocarriers. The team also pioneered the use of RNAi to reprogram immune cells and discover new therapeutic modalities. In addition, his lab was the first to show systemic, cell specific delivery of mRNA in an animal. Through this approach they have induced therapeutic gene expression of desired proteins (including novel approaches for cell specific, high efficiency therapeutic genome editing), which has implications in cancer, rare genetic diseases and infectious diseases.

Recently, the Peer lab was the first to develop a bacterial mRNA vaccine, which could provide a fast response against an aggressive bacterial infection and antibiotic-resistant strains. Furthermore, the team is developing novel therapeutic strategies to treat different types of cancers using novel drug targets that they identify, cancer vaccines or by using bacterial toxins in the form of mRNA to kill tumor cells.

In addition, the Peer lab generated a very large lipid library with unique architectures of lipids. Some of these lipids has unique features (e.g. immune-stimulated lipids as carriers of RNA payloads in vaccines or immune-silent lipids for multiple doses in therapeutics); controlling the degradability of the lipids using special rational design; and the lipid reactogenicity. These lipids have been licensed to several major pharmaceutical companies and are now under clinical development as carriers for siRNA, mRNA, and circRNA for different indications including cancer, infectious diseases, rare genetic diseases and inflammation. Among licensed companies are BioNtech SE, Merck, RiboX Therapeutics, LAND Therapeutics, NeoVac Ltd. and more.

Between 2020–2026, Peer served as the Vice President for Research and Development at TAU, and between 2021–2025 he served as the Chairman of Ramot, the technology transfer company of TAU, as well as the Chairman of TAU Ventures, the university's venture capital fund. His tenures were characterized by an academic uncertainty arising from the challenges posed by the COVID-19 pandemic and the Gaza War.

== Awards ==
Partial list:

- 2008 Alon fellowship for outstanding young researchers, awarded by the Israeli Ministry of Education.
- 2010 Innovator Award in Inflammatory Bowel Disease from the Kenneth Rainin Foundation (CA, USA)
- 2013 Breakthrough Award from the Kenneth Rainin Foundation
- 2014 Innovator Award, cancer therapeutics (The inaugural Untold News Award, 2014).
- 2014 Elected Member, Israel Young Academy.
- 2014 Elected President, Israeli Chapter of the Controlled Release Society (2 years term).
- 2015-2016 1st recipient of the UK-Israel Professorship.
- 2017 Nanos Award - World Leader Award for influential contributions to the field of NanoMedicine, CLINAM, Basel, Switzerland.
- 2020 Litwin IBD Pioneers Award, Crohn's and Colitis Foundation of America.
- 2021 Distinguished Research Award for Genome Editing, Genescript.
- 2022 Elected President, Israeli Society of Extracellular Vesicles (one year term)
- 2023 Elected, International Member, National Academy of Engineering (USA).
- 2024 Elected, Fellow, National Academy of Inventors (USA).
- 2025 Elected, Fellow, Controlled Release Society.
- 2025 Highly Ranked Scholar, top 0.05 % of all scholars.
- 2026 Rappaport Prize for Excellence in Biomedical Research.
- 2026 Landau Prize in Sciences and Arts in the Field of Nanotechnology.
- 2026 Controlled Release Society (CRS) Founders Award
