= Matthieu Wyart =

French physicist and economist

Professor Matthieu Wyart
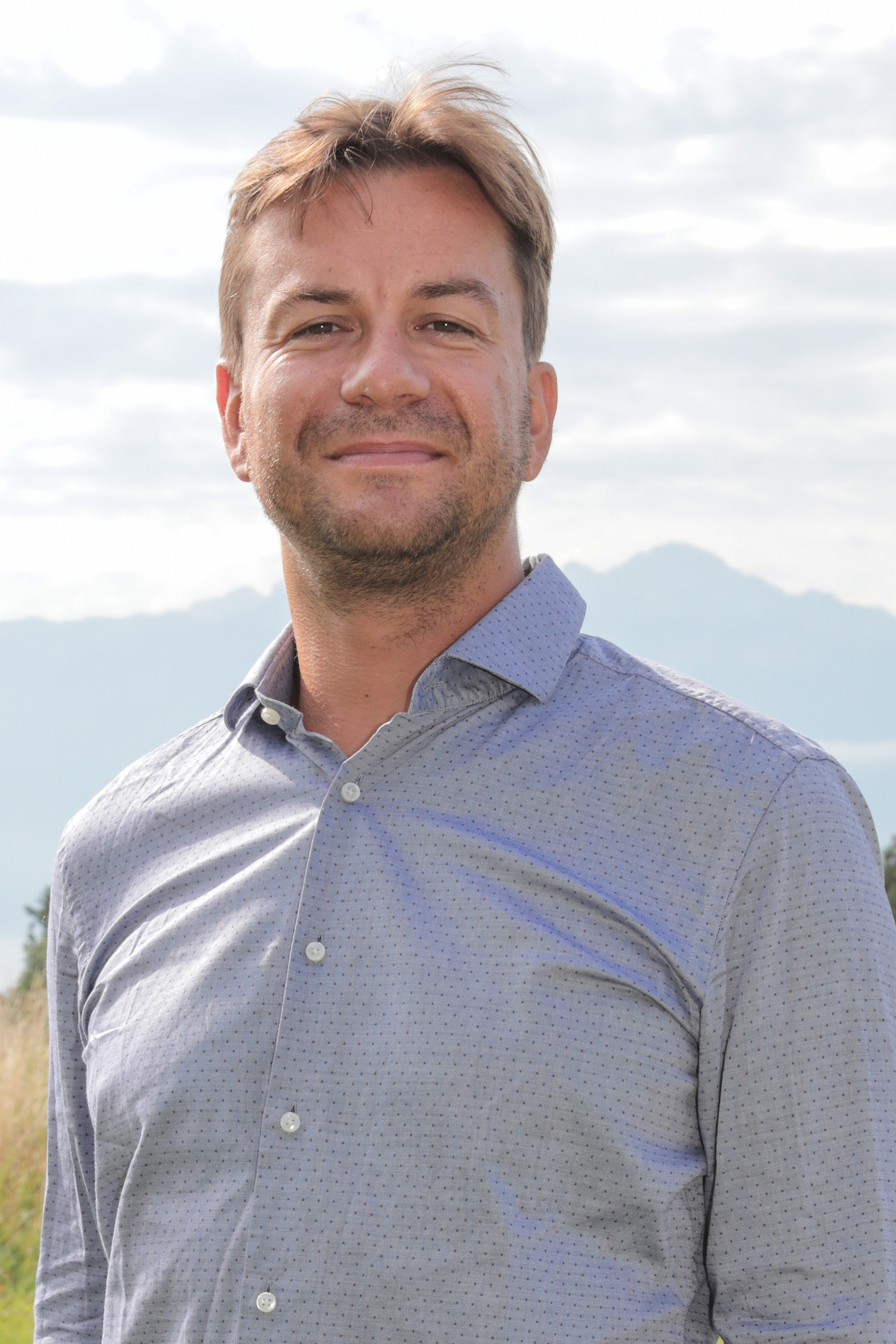
- Matthieu Wyart in 2021
- Born: 1978 (age 47–48); Paris, France
- Citizenship: France
- Education: Physics, mathematics, economics
- Alma mater: École Polytechnique; École normale supérieure Saclay Nuclear Research Centre
- Awards: 2024 Physik-Preis Dresden; 2015 Simons Investigator Award; 2011 Sloan Fellowship
- Scientific career
- Fields: Soft condensed-matter Glass transition Granular matter Deep learning Biophysics; Neuroscience; Econophysics
- Institutions: EPFL (École Polytechnique Fédérale de Lausanne)
- Thesis: On the rigidity of amorphous solids. Price fluctuations, Conventions and Microstructure of Financial Markets
- Doctoral advisor: Jean-Philippe Bouchaud
- Website: www.epfl.ch/labs/pcsl/

Matthieu Wyart (born 1978 in Paris, France) is a French physicist. He is a professor of physics at EPFL (École Polytechnique Fédérale de Lausanne) and the head of the Physics of Complex Systems Laboratory.

== Career ==
Wyart studied physics, mathematics and economics at the Ecole Polytechnique in Paris and obtained a degree with honors in physics in 2001. In 2002, he received a diploma in Advanced Studies in theoretical physics with highest honors from the École normale supérieure in Paris. He then joined Jean-Philippe Bouchaud and Marc Mézard at the Service de Physique de l'Etat Condensé (SPEC) at Saclay Nuclear Research Centre (CEA Saclay) in Paris as a doctoral student. In 2006, he gained a PhD in theoretical physics and finance for a thesis on electronic markets titled On the rigidity of amorphous solids. Price fluctuations, Conventions and Microstructure of Financial Markets.

In 2005, he became an analyst in the research department of Capital Fund Management. Between 2005 and 2008 he was George Carrier Fellow at Harvard University's School of Engineering and Applied Sciences. He then joined Howard Hughes Medical Institute's Janelia Farm Campus as a research specialist. Starting in 2009, he was a visiting research specialist at the Lewis-Sigler Institute at Princeton University. He then joined New York University first as Assistant Professor in 2010 and was promoted to an associate professor position in 2014.

Since July 2015, he has been Associate Professor of Theoretical Physics in the School of Basic Sciences at EPFL. He became full professor in 2024. He was named a Fellow of the American Physical Society in 2021.

== Research ==
Wyart's research encompassed field such as the architecture of allosteric materials, the theory of deep learning, the elasticity and mechanical stability in disordered solids, the granular and suspension flows, the glass and rigidity transitions, the marginal stability at random close packing and other glasses, and the yielding transition and elasto-plasticity.

In particular, some of his recent research is focused on the classification of the elementary excitations controlling the linear and the plastic response in amorphous materials. He has discovered that some of these excitations are marginally stable in the solid phase. This marginality fixes key aspects of structures, and suggest that the density of excitations presents a pseudo-gap. These concepts are important to understand low-temperature properties of glasses, the rheology of dense granular and suspension flows, the elasticity close to the jamming transition, the production transition in foams or metallic glass, and more broadly glassy systems with enough long-range interactions.

== Distinctions ==
Wyart is the recipient of the Physik-Preis Dresden 2024, the 2015 Simons Investigator Award by the Simons Foundation, Chaire Joliot (visiting professor) by the Ecole de Physique et Chimie in Paris in 2013, the 2011 Sloan Fellowship, and the 2005 G. Carrier Fellowship.

== Family ==
Wyart is the son of Françoise Brochard-Wyart and Pierre-Gilles de Gennes. He is married to Ksenia Tatarchenko and has two children.

== Selected works ==
- Wyart, M. (2005). "On the rigidity of amorphous solids". Annales de Physique. 30 (3): 1–96. arXiv:cond-mat/0512155. Bibcode:2005AnPh...30c...1W. doi:10.1051/anphys:2006003. ISSN 0003-4169. S2CID 119417013.
- Geiger, Mario; Petrini, Leonardo; Wyart, Matthieu (August 2021). "Landscape and training regimes in deep learning". Physics Reports. 924: 1–18. Bibcode:2021PhR...924....1G. doi:10.1016/j.physrep.2021.04.001. ISSN 0370-1573. S2CID 234848577.
- Müller, Markus; Wyart, Matthieu (March 2015). "Marginal Stability in Structural, Spin, and Electron Glasses". Annual Review of Condensed Matter Physics. 6 (1): 177–200. arXiv:1406.7669. Bibcode:2015ARCMP...6..177M. doi:10.1146/annurev-conmatphys-031214-014614. ISSN 1947-5454. S2CID 119251236.
- Wyart, Matthieu; Cates, Michael E. (2017-11-09). "Does a Growing Static Length Scale Control the Glass Transition?". Physical Review Letters. 119 (19) 195501. arXiv:1705.06588. Bibcode:2017PhRvL.119s5501W. doi:10.1103/physrevlett.119.195501. ISSN 0031-9007. PMID 29219532. S2CID 2211771.
- Wyart, M.; Cates, M. E. (2014-03-06). "Discontinuous Shear Thickening without Inertia in Dense Non-Brownian Suspensions". Physical Review Letters. 112 (9) 098302. arXiv:1311.4099. Bibcode:2014PhRvL.112i8302W. doi:10.1103/physrevlett.112.098302. hdl:20.500.11820/27efefc6-b716-458e-8a0a-9870cd2c20d9. ISSN 0031-9007. PMID 24655284. S2CID 10623461.
- Bouchaud, Jean-Philippe; Gefen, Yuval; Potters, Marc; Wyart, Matthieu (April 2004). "Fluctuations and response in financial markets: the subtle nature of 'random' price changes". Quantitative Finance. 4 (2): 176–190. arXiv:cond-mat/0307332. doi:10.1080/14697680400000022. ISSN 1469-7688. S2CID 219718300.
