= Rachel Dutton =

American microbiologist

Professor Rachel Dutton Ph.D.
- Scientific career
- Institutions: Harvard University; University of California, San Diego
- Thesis: Vitamin K epoxide reductase homologues provide an alternative pathway for bacterial disulfide bond formation (2010)
- Doctoral advisor: Jon Beckwith
- Website: Lab Website

Rachel Dutton is an American microbiologist. She has developed the microorganisms that live on cheese into a model system for complex interacting microbial communities. She has worked with chefs including Dan Felder, head of research and development at Momofuku to develop new fermentation procedures to be used in food and has been called the "go-to microbiologist" for chefs and gastronomists.

She is an assistant professor in the Division of Biological Sciences at the University of California, San Diego.

== Early life and education ==
Dutton grew up in South San Francisco, California. She earned her B.Sc. in molecular biology at the University of California, San Diego in 2002. She performed her Ph.D. work in the laboratory of Jon Beckwith at Harvard Medical School, graduating in 2010.

== Career ==
In 2010, Dutton became an independent Bauer Fellow at Harvard University, where she initiated a study of the microbial communities that live on cheese and give cheeses their particular flavors. She reasoned that cheese microbes would be less complex and more consistent than other microbial communities such as the gut microbiome or soil microorganisms, and therefore act as a model system in which principles of microbial interactions in more complex communities and ecosystems could be investigated. To begin her studies, she learned to make cheese herself, and collaborated with local artisan cheesemakers. By sequencing the microorganisms found on 137 cheese rinds from 10 different countries, she identified 24 genera of bacteria and fungi that are dominant in cheese microbial communities. She developed a microbiological culture system that mimics the normal conditions of community formation to reconstruct and manipulate the interactions between species in these communities, identifying widespread bacterial-fungal interactions. She uses these cultures to investigate the genetic requirements for community interactions and how horizontal gene transfer affects the genetic makeup of species in these communities.

Dutton collaborates widely with chefs and cheesemakers, and has appeared in the Netflix documentary Cooked, (episode 4) the PBS documentary series The Mind of a Chef, (season 1, episode 2), and on the podcasts Science Friday and Meet the Microbiologist. In 2021, she was a guest on the Netflix show Ada Twist, Scientist in the episode The Great Stink.

In 2015 Dutton moved to the University of California, San Diego, where she is an assistant professor in the Division of Biological Sciences, Section on Molecular Biology.

== Awards ==
- 2010: Bauer Fellow
- 2016: Packard Fellow
- 2017: Pew Scholar
- 2018: NIH Director's New Innovator Award
