= Priya Rajasethupathy =

Indian-American neuroscientist

- Priyamvada Rajasethupathy
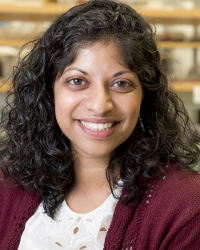
- Education: Cornell University, BA, 2004; Columbia University, MD-PhD, 2013
- Awards: Searle Scholar, NIH Director's New Innovator Award
- Scientific career
- Fields: Neuroscience
- Workplaces: Stanford University; Rockefeller University
- Thesis: Novel Small-RNA Mediated Gene Regulatory Mechanisms for Long-Term Memory (2012)
- Doctoral advisor: Eric Kandel
- Other academic advisors: Karl Deisseroth
- Website: Research website

Priya Rajasethupathy is an Indian-American neuroscientist and assistant professor at Rockefeller University, leading the Laboratory of Neural Dynamics and Cognition.

== Education and early career ==
Priya Rajasethupathy grew up in Brockport, New York. She received her Bachelor of Arts degree in biology with a pre-medicine concentration from Cornell University in 2004. For her undergraduate thesis, she identified aptamers that provided structural and functional insight into therapeutic compounds for treatment of epilepsy. Following her Bachelor's degree, she moved to India for a year to work with people with mental illness, while also conducting neuroscience research at the National Centre for Biological Sciences in Bangalore. She then attended Columbia University for her MD–PhD degree. She did her doctoral work under the mentorship of Nobel laureate Eric Kandel, where she used California sea slugs (Aplysia californica) as a model organism to understand how small non-coding RNA molecules in nerve cells regulate the formation and storage of memories. During her doctoral career, she discovered a brain-specific and highly conserved microRNA species (miR-124) that is abundant in the central nervous system (CNS) of sea slugs and that is important for establishing synaptic plasticity, or the ability of neuronal connections to strengthen and weaken over time. Rajasethupathy later identified a new class of small non-coding RNAs in the CNS – piRNAs – which were previously thought to be present only in germ cells and germline tissues. Furthermore, she found that piRNAs can epigenetically modify DNA to enable long-lasting changes in synaptic strength, which may provide insight into the maintenance of long-term memories.

Following her graduate career, Rajasethupathy began a postdoctoral fellowship in 2013 in the laboratory of Karl Deisseroth, a pioneer in the field of optogenetics and future Nobel laureate. There, she discovered a novel brain pathway from the prefrontal cortex to hippocampus that is required for memory retrieval. She used mice as a model organism and employed techniques in optogenetics to control and monitor individual neurons in living tissue, two-photon excitation microscopy to image living tissue, and volumetric gene expression profiles of the intact brain to understand how gene expression directs brain activity during behavior. Her postdoctoral work earned her recognition from Science News, who named her one of their top 10 early career scientists in 2015.

== Research ==
In 2017, Rajasethupathy was appointed the Jonathan M. Nelson Family Assistant Professor and head of the Laboratory of Neural Dynamics & Cognition at the Rockefeller University. Her lab continues research into how memories form, stabilize, and re-organize over time by observing and manipulating neural circuitry while monitoring the behavior of animals performing tasks that require the storage or retrieval of memories. Her research is supported by an NIH Director's New Innovator Award, which supports high risk, high reward projects driven by young scientists with $2.5 million awarded over the course of five years.

== Selected publications ==
1. Rajasethupathy, P. et al. Targeting neural circuits. Cell 165, 524–534 (2016).
2. Sylwestrak, E.L. et al. Multiplexed intact-tissue transcriptional analysis at cellular resolution. Cell 164, 792–804 (2016)
3. Rajasethupathy, P. et al. Projections from neocortex mediate top-down control of memory retrieval. Nature 526, 653–659 (2015).
4. Rajasethupathy, P. et al. A role for neuronal piRNAs in the epigenetic control of memory-related synaptic plasticity. Cell 149, 693–707 (2012)
5. Rajasethupathy, P. et al. Characterization of small RNAs in Aplysia reveals a role for miR-124 in constraining synaptic plasticity through CREB. Neuron 63, 803–817 (2009).

== Awards and honors ==
- Harold M. Weintraub Graduate Student Award, Fred Hutchinson Cancer Research Center, 2012
- Top 10 Early Career Scientists, Science News, 2015
- NIH Director's New Innovator Award, 2017
- Searle Scholar, 2018
- Klingenstein-Simons Fellow, Simons Foundation and the Esther A. and Joseph Klingenstein Fund, 2018
