= Paul Goldberger =

American author, architecture critic and lecturer (born 1950)

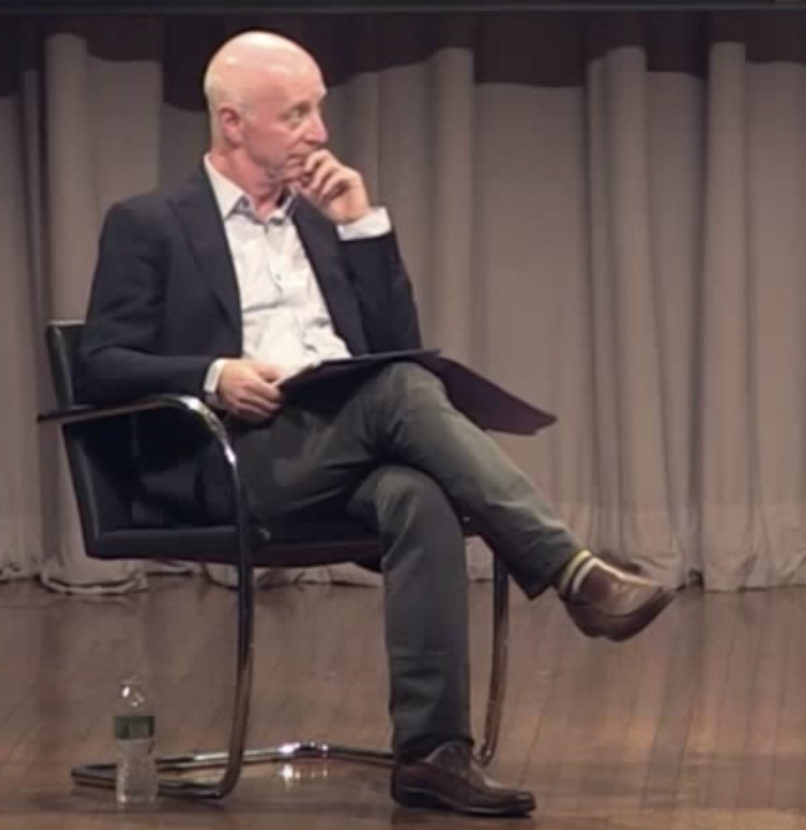
- Born: December 4, 1950 (age 75); Passaic, New Jersey, U.S.
- Occupations: Architectural critic Journalist
- Title: former Dean of Parsons School of Design
- Spouse: Susan Lynn Solomon (m. 1980; died 2022)
- Children: 3
- Awards: Pulitzer Prize for Criticism (1984); Vincent Scully Prize (2012)

Paul Goldberger (born December 4, 1950) is an American author, architecture critic and lecturer, widely known as contributing editor at Vanity Fair, architectural critic for The New York Times, and columnist of "Sky Line" for The New Yorker.

In 1984, while at The New York Times, Goldberger received the Pulitzer Prize for Distinguished Criticism, the highest award in journalism.

== Background ==
Paul Jesse Goldberger was born on December 4, 1950 in Passaic, New Jersey, the son of Morris Goldberger (1924-2006), an English teacher and Edna Goldberger (née Kronman, 1924-2009), both of Jewish origins. along with a brother Joseph and sister Miriam.

He graduated in 1972 from Yale University, where he studied art history, and has honorary doctoral degrees from the Pratt Institute and the New York School of Interior Design; a Doctor of Humane Letters (honorary), University Miami, 2004, and a Doctor of Humane Letters (honorary), Kenyon College, 2005.

A resident of the Midtown East in Manhattan, Goldberger is widowed by Susan L. Solomon (1951-2022) with whom he had three sons, David Solomon Goldberger, Adam Hirsh Goldberger and Benjamin James Solomon Goldberger. He has lived in numerous notable buildings in New York City, including The Dakota; The San Remo; The Beresford by Emery Roth and 870 United Nations Plaza by Harrison & Abramovitz.

== Career ==
Shortly after starting as a reporter at The New York Times in 1972, Goldberger was assigned to write the obituary of noted architect Louis Kahn, who had died suddenly of a heart attack in Penn Station. In 1973, he was named an architecture critic, working alongside Ada Louise Huxtable until 1982.

In 1984, Goldberger won the Pulitzer Prize for his architecture criticism in the Times, and in 1996, New York City mayor Rudolph Giuliani presented Goldberger with the city's Preservation Achievement Award in recognition of the impact of his work on historic preservation.

Goldberger is also the author of several books, including Up from Zero: Politics, Architecture, and the Rebuilding of New York and The City Observed, New York, a Guide to the Architecture of Manhattan.

In a May 2005 New Yorker column, he suggested that the best solution for rebuilding at Ground Zero would focus on residential use mixed with cultural and memorial elements.

From July 2004 until June 2006, Goldberger served as the Dean of Parsons The New School for Design, an art and design college of The New School. He currently remains the Joseph Urban Professor of Design at the institution.

== Works ==
=== Books ===
- Up from Zero: Politics, Architecture, and the Rebuilding of New York.
- The City Observed, New York, a Guide to the Architecture of Manhattan (1979). Vintage Books, ISBN 0-394-72916-1.
- Why Architecture Matters (2009). Yale University Press, ISBN 978-0300144307.
- Building Up and Tearing Down: Reflections on the Age of Architecture (2009). The Monacelli Press, ISBN 978-1580932646.
- Building Art: The Life and Work of Frank Gehry (2015). Knopf ISBN 978-0-307-70153-4
- Ballpark: Baseball in the American City (2019). Knopf Doubleday Publishing Group, ISBN 0-307-70154-9

=== Articles ===
- Goldberger, Paul (1 December 2008). "Talk of the Town: Father and Son: Swing Science". The New Yorker. Vol. 84, no. 39. pp. 30–31. Reports on a joint lecture by Harold Varmus and his son Jacob Varmus.
