= Pierre-Gilles de Gennes =

Nobel-laureate physicist

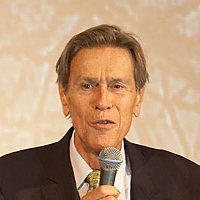
- De Gennes in 2006
- Born: 24 October 1932; Paris, France
- Died: 18 May 2007 (aged 74); Orsay, France
- Education: École Normale Supérieure; Paris-Saclay University
- Known for: Being the founder of soft matter physics Landau–de Gennes theory Polymer physics Reptation; Liquid crystalline elastomer Bogoliubov–de Gennes equation de Gennes–Alexander theory Caroli–de Gennes–Matricon state Fisher–de Gennes scaling de Gennes–Kleman length
- Children: 7, including Claire Wyart
- Awards: Fernand Holweck Medal and Prize (1968); Bourke Award (1976); Racah Lecture (1976); Ampère Prize (1977); CNRS Gold Medal (1980); Gay-Lussac–Humboldt Prize (1983); ForMemRS (1984); Fritz London Memorial Lecure (1985); Matteucci Medal (1987); Harvey Prize (1988); Lorentz Medal (1990); Wolf Prize (1990); Nobel Prize for Physics (1991); Onsager Lecture (1997); Eringen Medal (1998)
- Scientific career
- Fields: Physics; Soft matter Superconductivity
- Workplaces: ESPCI; Collège de France; University of Paris XI
- Thesis: Contribution à l'étude de la diffusion magnétique des neutrons (1957)
- Doctoral advisor: Francis Perrin

Pierre-Gilles de Gennes (French: [pjɛʁ ʒil də ʒɛn]; 24 October 1932 – 18 May 2007) was a French physicist and the Nobel Prize laureate in physics in 1991.

== Education and early life ==
He was born in Paris, France, and was home-schooled to the age of 12. By the age of 13, he had adopted adult reading habits and was visiting museums. Later, de Gennes studied at the École Normale Supérieure. After leaving the École in 1955, he became a research engineer at the Saclay center of the Commissariat à l'Énergie Atomique, working mainly on neutron scattering and magnetism, with advice from Anatole Abragam and Jacques Friedel. He defended his Ph.D. in 1957 at the University of Paris.

== Career and research ==
In 1959, he was a postdoctoral research visitor with Charles Kittel at the University of California, Berkeley, and then spent 27 months in the French Navy. In 1961, he was assistant professor in Orsay and soon started the Orsay group on superconductors. In 1968, he switched to studying liquid crystals.

In 1971, he became professor at the Collège de France, and participated in STRASACOL (a joint action of Strasbourg, Saclay and Collège de France) on polymer physics. From 1980 on, he became interested in interfacial problems: the dynamics of wetting and adhesion.

He worked on granular materials and on the nature of memory objects in the brain.

== Awards and honours ==
Awarded the Fernand Holweck Medal and Prize in 1968.

He was awarded the Harvey Prize, Lorentz Medal and Wolf Prize in 1988 and 1990. In 1991, he received the Nobel Prize in Physics. He was then director of the École Supérieure de Physique et de Chimie Industrielles de la Ville de Paris (ESPCI), a post he held from 1976 until his retirement in 2002.

P.G. de Gennes has also received the F.A. Cotton Medal for Excellence in Chemical Research of the American Chemical Society in 1997, the Holweck Prize from the joint French and British Physical Society; the Ampere Prize, French Academy of Science; the gold medal from the French CNRS; the Matteuci Medal, Italian Academy; the Harvey Prize, Israel; and polymer awards from both APS and ACS.

He was awarded the above-mentioned Nobel Prize for discovering that "methods developed for studying order phenomena in simple systems can be generalized to more complex forms of matter, in particular to liquid crystals and polymers".

The Royal Society of Chemistry awards the De Gennes Prize biennially, in his honour. He was elected a Foreign Member of the Royal Society (ForMemRS) in 1984. He was awarded A. Cemal Eringen Medal in 1998.

== Personal life ==
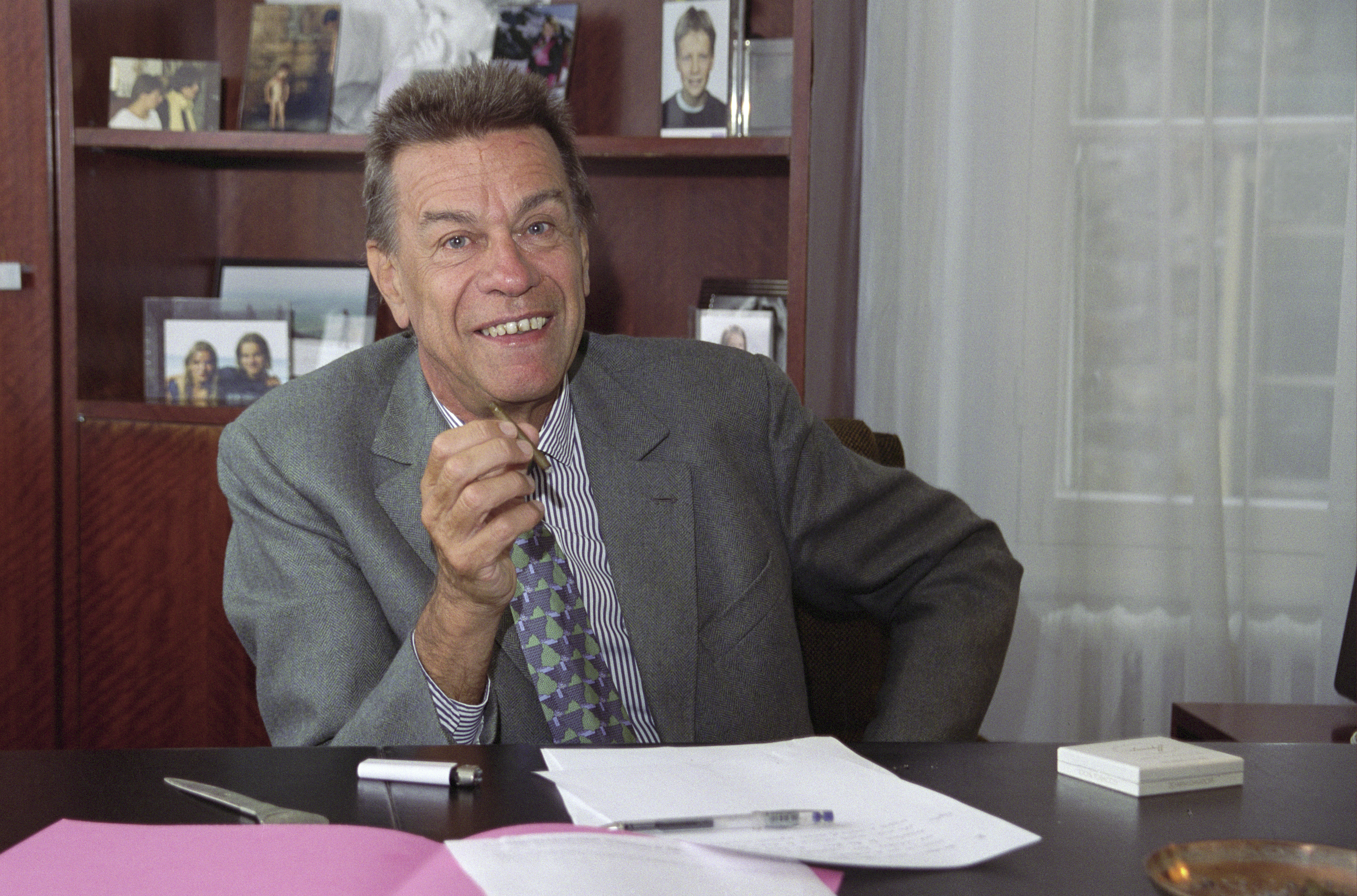
De Gennes in his office at ESPCI Paris, 1988

He married Anne-Marie Rouet (born in 1933) in June 1954. They remained married until his death and had three children together: Christian (born 9 December 1954), Dominique (born 6 May 1956) and Marie-Christine (born 11 January 1958).

He also had four children with physicist Françoise Brochard-Wyart (born in 1944) who was one of his former doctoral students and then colleague and co-author. The children are: Claire Wyart (born 16 February 1977), Matthieu Wyart (born 24 May 1978), Olivier Wyart (born 3 August 1984) and Marc de Gennes (born 16 January 1991).

Professors John Goodby and George Gray noted in an obituary: "Pierre was a man of great charm and humour, capable of making others believe they, too, were wise. We will remember him as an inspirational lecturer and teacher, an authority on Shakespeare, an expert skier who attended conference lectures appropriately attired with skis to hand, and, robed in red, at the Bordeaux liquid crystal conference in 1978, took great delight in being inaugurated as a Vignoble de St Émilion."

In 2003 he was one of 22 Nobel Laureates who signed the Humanist Manifesto.

On 22 May 2007, his death was made public as official messages and tributes poured in.

== Publications ==
=== Books ===
- Pierre-Gilles de Gennes (1966). Superconductivity of metals and alloys. Westview Press. ISBN 978-0738201016.
- Pierre-Gilles de Gennes, Jacques Prost (1993) [1974]. The physics of liquid crystals. Oxford University Press. ISBN 978-0198517856.
- Pierre-Gilles de Gennes (1979). Scaling concepts in polymer physics. Cornell University Press. ISBN 978-0801412035.
- Pierre-Gilles de Gennes (1990). Introduction to polymer dynamics. Cambridge University Press. ISBN 978-0521388498.
- Pierre-Gilles de Gennes, Jacques Badoz (1996). Fragile Objects: Soft Matter, Hard Science, and the Thrill of Discovery. Cambridge University Press. ISBN 978-1461275282.
- Pierre-Gilles de Gennes (1997). Soft Interfaces: The 1994 Dirac Memorial Lecture. Cambridge University Press. ISBN 978-0521020350.
- Pierre-Gilles de Gennes (1998). Simple Views on Condensed Matter: Expanded Edition. WSPC. ISBN 978-9810232702.
- Gennes, Pierre-Gilles de; Brochard-Wyart, Françoise; Quéré, David (2003). Capillarity and Wetting Phenomena: Drops, Bubbles, Pearls, Waves. Springer. ISBN 978-0387005928.
- Pierre-Gilles de Gennes (2004). Petit Point: A Candid Portrait on the Aberrations of Science. World Scientific. ISBN 978-9812560117.

== See also ==
- History of ESPCI Paris
- ESPCI Paris
