= Emanual Maverakis =

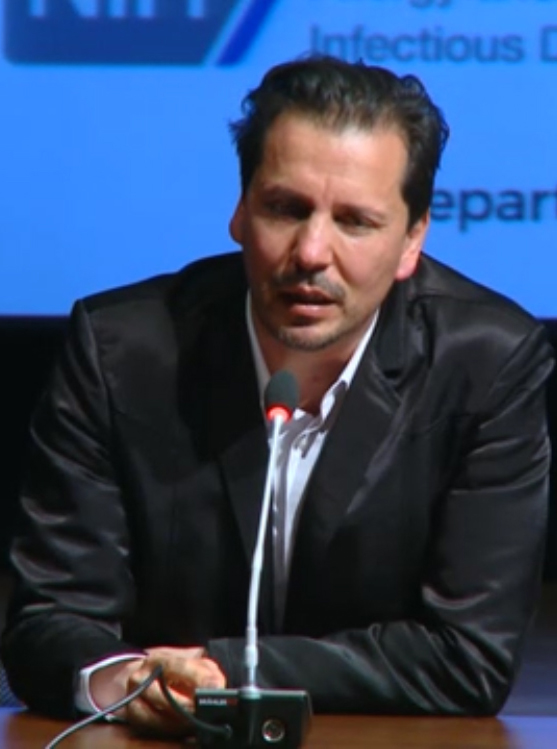
- Maverakis in 2018
- Born: Oakland, California
- Education: Medicine
- Alma mater: University of California, Los Angeles; Harvard Medical School
- Awards: Presidential Early Career Award for Scientists and Engineers; NIH Director's New Innovator Award; Burroughs Wellcome Fund
- Scientific career
- Fields: Immunogenetics
- Workplaces: University of California, Los Angeles; La Jolla Institute for Immunology; Harvard University; Beth Israel Deaconess Medical Center; Department of Veterans Affairs; University of California, Davis
- Thesis: Mhc-guided processing: binding of large antigen fragments (2003)

Emanual Maverakis is an American physician-scientist and immunologist specializing in immunogenetics. He is a professor at the University of California, Davis.

== Early life and education ==
Emanual Maverakis was born in Oakland, California, and spent his early childhood in South Central Los Angeles. His family later relocated to Moorpark, California, where he attended high school. Maverakis is of mixed heritage: his mother's family immigrated from Jalisco, Mexico, and his father's family immigrated from Crete.

Although Maverakis would become an accomplished academic, he did not immediately pursue higher education after high school. Instead, he spent three years working as a security guard. He eventually completed his undergraduate studies at the University of California, Los Angeles (UCLA), where he worked with and was mentored by the late Eli Sercarz, PhD, a notable immunologist. Maverakis graduated from UCLA with departmental honors and the Latin distinction summa cum laude.

Concerned about Maverakis' rough vernacular, Dr. Sercarz recommended that he delay matriculation to Harvard Medical School for one year, which Maverakis agreed to. During medical school, Maverakis continued his research efforts and spent a year as a Howard Hughes Medical Institute Student Research Fellow at the La Jolla Institute for Immunology between his second and third years. He graduated from Harvard Medical School in 2003 with an MD summa cum laude, becoming one of only 15 medical students in Harvard's 237-year history to achieve the highest honors.

== Career ==
Maverakis joined the United States Department of Veterans Affairs in 2007, where he held a joint appointment as an assistant professor in residence at the University of California, Davis. After six years with the VA, he relocated his laboratory and clinical duties to the University of California, Davis, where he is now a full professor in the Department of Dermatology. His research team is known for their work in predictive modeling and the development of novel analysis tools in immunogenetics.

As a principal investigator, Maverakis has received several prestigious awards, including the NIH Director's New Innovator Award, the Presidential Early Career Award for Scientists and Engineers from President Barack Obama, and early career awards from the Burroughs Wellcome Fund and the Howard Hughes Medical Institute. He is also an elected honorary fellow of the California Academy of Sciences (2019) and the American Association for the Advancement of Science (2023). In 2022, he was elected to the American Society for Clinical Investigation.
