= Leor Weinberger =

American virologist and quantitative biologist

- Born: 1975 (age 50–51); Toronto, Canada
- Citizenship: United States
- Education: University of California, Berkeley (PhD); Princeton University (Lewis Thomas Fellow)
- Known for: viral latency programs, Therapeutic Interfering Particles (TIPs), stochastic fluctuations/bet-hedging
- Awards: Pew Scholar; Sloan Fellow; Blavatnik Fellow; Keck awardee TED speaker NIH Director's Pioneer Award; NIH Director's New Innovator Award; NIH Avant-Garde Award for HIV Research
- Scientific career
- Fields: Virology, Synthetic Biology
- Workplaces: University of California, San Francisco; Gladstone Institutes

Weinberger TED talk, Boston 2020

Leor S. Weinberger is an American virologist and quantitative biologist. He is credited with discovering the HIV virus latency circuit, and providing the first experimental evidence that stochastic gene expression fluctuations ('noise') drive cell fate decisions. He pioneered the concept of therapeutic interfering particles, or "TIPs", which are resistance-proof antivirals. His TED talk on this novel antiviral approach, 20 years in the making, has been called a "highlight" of TED and received a standing ovation from the live audience. Weinberger was profiled in The New York Times by Carl Zimmer, in Science magazine and in Le Monde.

Weinberger is currently the Sylvester Professor and Founding Chairman of the Department of Cell and Systems Biology at the Miller School of Medicine, University of Miami and the Sylvester Comprehensive Cancer Center and was recruited to Miami as part of a $30M package to enhance the Miller school's science. He was previously the William and Ute Bowes Distinguished Professor of Virology, director of the Gladstone Center for Cell Circuitry, professor of pharmaceutical chemistry, and professor of biochemistry and biophysics at the University of California, San Francisco. He has won six NIH Director's Awards (more than any other scientist), including the NIH Director's Pioneer Award (2x), NIH Director's Transformative Research Award, NIH Avant Garde Award (2x), and NIH Director's New Innovator Award.

== Education and career ==
Weinberger received his undergraduate degree in biophysics from University of Maryland, College Park in 1998. He completed his PhD in Biophysics, with a focus on HIV, from University of California, Berkeley in 2004. He received postdoctoral training at Princeton University as a Lewis Thomas Fellow, working with Thomas Shenk and David Botstein.

After completing his fellowship at Princeton, Weinberger joined the University of California, San Diego, as an assistant professor for the Department of Chemistry and Biochemistry. Afterwards, he moved to the University of California, San Francisco (UCSF) as an associate professor in biochemistry and biophysics before transitioning to Gladstone Institutes, the non-profit research institution associated with UCSF where he rose to William and Ute Bowes Distinguished Professor, director of the Gladstone Center for Cell Circuitry, professor of pharmaceutical chemistry, and professor of biochemistry and biophysics at the University of California, San Francisco. As of 2025, Weinberger is the Sylvester Professor and Founding Chairman of the Department of Cell and Systems Biology at the University of Miami Miller School of Medicine.

== Research ==
=== Areas of focus ===
Weinberger and his lab specialize in virology, with a specific focus on HIV/AIDS, human cytomegalovirus, and herpesvirus. As stated on their website, the lab uses "mathematical & experimental approaches to decode the regulatory principles viruses use to select between alternate fates" and develop therapeutic targets and antiviral strategies based on those principles.

=== Major discoveries ===
Weinberger and his lab have been credited with the discovery of HIV's intrinsic decision circuit. Their 2005 paper in Cell showed that stochastic fluctuations in gene expression, or 'noise' can drive cell fate decisions enabling viral latency, which is recognized as a primary barrier to HIV cure. The lab has since been able to identify similar stochastic processes in other viruses, such as a kind of herpesvirus called human cytomegalovirus, as published in a 2020 paper. Weinberger and his lab are looking for ways to target the latency reservoir of viruses as a form of treatment.

Weinberger's work has been referred to as "part of what some scientists are calling a 'renaissance' in viral therapy" by the San Francisco Chronicle. According to Wired, Weinberger has pioneered research to combat HIV by creating "therapeutic interfering particles" or "TIPs". Weinberger first began testing this concept when he was in graduate school at Berkeley studying the biophysics of HIV. As described on Weinberger's lab website and in a pre-print research article, TIPs are engineered deletion mutants designed to piggyback on a virus and deprive the virus of replication material, thus reducing viral load. TIPs replicate and co-evolve with a virus, making it a treatment that solves what Weinberger has called a "fundamental mismatch" between viruses and treatment: viruses evolve, vaccines do not. TIPs also have the capacity to transmit along viral transmission routes, harnessing the power of virus "super spreaders" and transmitting the treatment to resource-limited and remote populations like communities in South Africa. TIP research has been supported by the Department of Defense DARPA program, NIH/NIDA, and recently the Joint Warfighter Medical Research Program for a clinical trial.

== Awards and honors ==
Weinberger holds numerous patents for inventing novel antiviral medicines. Weinberger was named a Pew Scholar in the Biomedical Sciences in 2008, an Alfred P. Sloan Foundation Research Fellow in 2011, and a Keck Awardee. He served on the Bill & Melinda Gates Foundation Innovation review panel, and his research has been widely published in Science, Nature, and Cell. He is a public supporter of open science collaboration and is a contributor to the Wall Street Journal, where his writings have launched international programs.
