= Heino Finkelmann =

German chemist (born 1945)

- Born: 1945 (age 80–81); Gronau, Lower Saxony, Germany
- Education: Technische Universität Berlin
- Known for: Polymer chemistry Liquid crystalline elastomer
- Awards: EPS Europhysics Prize (2003); Gay-Lussac Humboldt Prize (2000)
- Scientific career
- Fields: Chemistry
- Workplaces: Paderborn University; Johannes Gutenberg University Mainz; Clausthal University of Technology; University of Freiburg
- Doctoral advisor: Horst Stegemeyer

Heino Finkelmann (born 1945) is a German chemist who works with liquid-crystalline elastomers.

== Biography ==
After earning an engineering degree, Finkelmann graduated 1972 as chemist (Diplom) from Technische Universität Berlin. In 1975, he earned his PhD at the Paderborn University under the supervision of Horst Stegemeyer in Physical Chemistry.

After three years of Postdoc under the guidance of Helmut Ringsdorf at the Johannes Gutenberg University Mainz, Finkelmann habilitated from 1978 to 1984 at the Clausthal University of Technology with the group of Günther Rehage in Physical Chemistry.

From 1984 to 2010, Finkelmann was appointed Full Professor and Director of the Institute for Macromolecular Chemistry at the Albert Ludwig University of Freiburg.

One of his famous works is the concept of the side chain nematic elastomers.

== Honours, decorations, awards and distinctions ==
- 1984: Carl Duisberg Memorial Prize from the Society of German Chemists
- 2000: Gay-Lussac Humboldt Prize
- 2003: Agilent Technologies Europhysics Prize of the European Physical Society
- 2004: Doctor Honoris Causa by the University of Toulouse
- 2006: George William Gray Medal of the British Liquid Crystal Society
