= Susan L. Solomon =

American executive and lawyer (1951–2022)

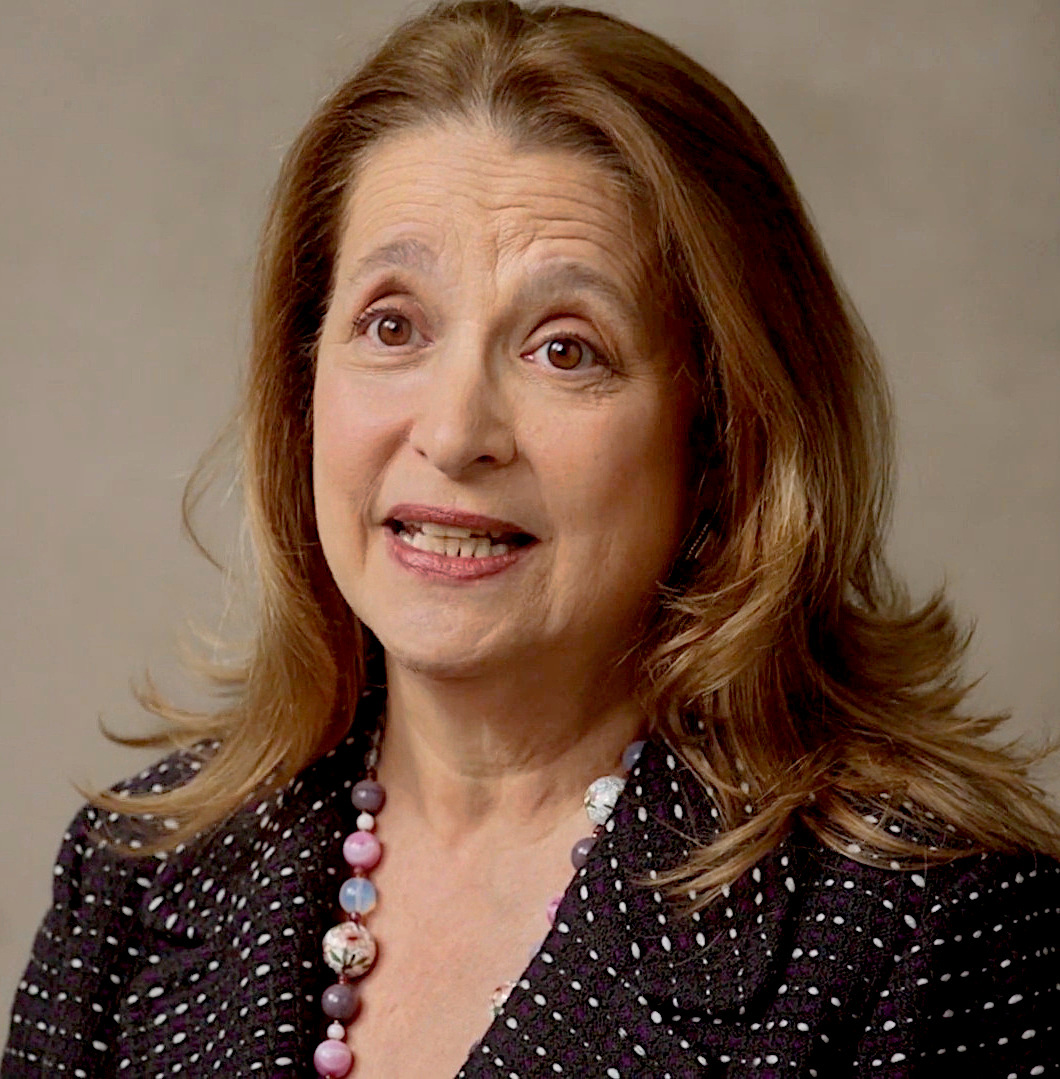
- Solomon speaking in 2016
- Born: August 23, 1951; Brooklyn, New York City, New York, U.S.
- Died: September 8, 2022 (age 71); Amagansett, New York, US
- Education: New York University (BA); Rutgers University (JD)

Susan Lynn Solomon (August 23, 1951 – September 8, 2022) was an American executive and lawyer. She was the chief executive officer and co-founder of the New York Stem Cell Foundation (NYSCF).

== Early life and education ==
Solomon was born in Brooklyn on August 23, 1951. Her father, Seymour Solomon, was the co-founder of Vanguard Records alongside his brother, Maynard; her mother, Ruth (Katz), was a pianist and worked as a manager of concert musicians. Solomon attended the Fieldston School. She then studied history at New York University, graduating with a bachelor's degree in 1975. Three years later, she obtained a Juris Doctor from Rutgers University School of Law, where she was an editor of the Rutgers Law Review.

== Career ==
Solomon started her career as an attorney at Debevoise & Plimpton, and worked in the legal profession until 1981. She subsequently held executive positions at MacAndrews & Forbes and APAX (formerly MMG Patricof and Co.). She was the founder and President of Sony Worldwide Networks, the chairman and CEO of Lancit Media Productions, an Emmy award-winning television production company, and then served as the founding CEO of Sotheby's website prior to founding her own strategic management consulting firm Solomon Partners LLC in 2000.

Solomon was a founding Board member of the Global Alliance for iPSC Therapies (GAiT) and New Yorkers for the Advancement of Medical Research (NYAMR). She served on the Board of the College Diabetes Network and was a board member for the Centre for Commercialization of Regenerative Medicine. She also served on the board of directors of the Regional Plan Association of New York, where she was a member of the nominating and governance committee. She previously sat on the strategic planning committee for the Empire State Stem Cell Board.

== NYSCF ==
Solomon co-founded NYSCF in 2005. She had earlier started work as a health-care advocate in 1992, when her son was diagnosed with type 1 diabetes. As a result of her son's diagnosis and then her mother's death from cancer in 2004, she sought to find a way in which the most advanced medical research could translate more quickly into cures. In conversations with clinicians and scientists, Solomon identified stem cells as the most promising way to address unmet patient needs.

At the time of her death, NYSCF was one of the biggest nonprofits dedicated to stem cell research, employing 45 scientists at their Research Institute in Manhattan and funding an additional 75 scientists around the world.

== Personal life ==
Solomon married her first husband, Gary Hirsh, in 1968. Together, they had one son. They divorced and she later married Paul Goldberger in 1980. They remained married until her death, and had two children.

Solomon died on September 8, 2022, at her home in Amagansett, New York. She was 71, and suffered from ovarian cancer prior to her death.

== Awards ==
- Living Landmark Honoree, New York Landmarks Conservancy, 2015
- Stem Cell Action Leadership Award, Genetics Policy Institute, 2012
- New York State Women of Excellence Award 2008
- Triumph Award, The Brooke Ellison Foundation, 2008

== Publications ==
=== Articles ===
- "Institutional Report Cards for Gender Equality: Lessons Learned from Benchmarking Efforts for Women in STEM." Cell Stem Cell (September 9, 2019).
- "Automated, high-throughput derivation, characterization and differentiation of induced pluripotent stem cells." Nature Methods (August 3, 2015).
- "Cell Therapy Worldwide: An Incipient Revolution." Regenerative Medicine (March 1, 2015).
- "7 Actionable Strategies For Advancing Women in Science, Engineering, and Medicine." Cell Stem Cell (March 5, 2015).
- "Human Oocytes Reprogram Adult Somatic Nuclei to Diploid Pluripotent Stem Cells." Nature (April 28, 2014).
- "Twenty years of the International Society for Cellular Therapies: the past, present and future of cellular therapy clinical development." Cytotherapy (April 14, 2014).
- "The New York Stem Cell Foundation. Interview with Susan Solomon." Regenerative Medicine (November 2012).
- "The New York Stem Cell Foundation: Accelerating Cures Through Stem Cell Research." Stem Cells Translational Medicine (April 2012).
- "The sixth annual translational stem cell research conference of the New York Stem Cell Foundation." Annals of the New York Academy of Sciences (May 2012).
- Case Comment "Monty Python and the Lanham Act: In Search of the Moral Right." Rutgers Law Review (Winter 1977) 3(2).

=== Editorials ===
- "Raising the Standards of Stem Cell Line Quality." Nature Cell Biology (March 31, 2016).
- "Banking on iPSC—Is it Doable and is it Worthwhile". Stem Cell Research and Reviews (December 17, 2014).
- "#StemCells: Education, Innovation, and Outreach." Cell Stem Cell: Voices (November 7, 2013).
- "The New Nonprofit: A Model for Innovation Across Sectors." Smart Assets: The Philanthropy New York Blog (March 14, 2013).
- "Stem Cell Research: Science, Not Politics." The Huffington Post (September 21, 2010).
- "Opinion: Science Shoved Aside in Stem Cell Ruling." AOL News (August 25, 2010).
- "Opportunity for Excellence: The Critical Role of State Programs in the New Federal Landscape." The Huffington Post (June 12, 2009).
- "Patients Before Politics: Putting Science First." The Huffington Post (March 9, 2009).
- "The Stem Cell Wars Are Not Over." The Huffington Post (November 30, 2007).
- "After Bush's Veto, What is Next for Stem Cell Research?" The Huffington Post (June 20, 2007).
- "Spitzer Shows Leadership in Stem Cell Research." Times Union (February 18, 2007).
- "Today's Stem Cell Bill: A Politically Expedient Approach." The Huffington Post (July 18, 2006).
