= Guillermo Ameer =

American biomedical engineering professor

- Education: University of Texas at Austin (B.S.); Massachusetts Institute of Technology (Sc.D.)
- Scientific career
- Fields: Biomedical engineering
- Workplaces: Northwestern University
- Doctoral advisor: Robert Langer
- Doctoral students: Eun Ji Chung

Guillermo Antonio Ameer is the Daniel Hale Williams Professor of biomedical engineering at the Robert R. McCormick School of Engineering and Applied Science and Surgery at the Feinberg School of Medicine of Northwestern University and is a fellow of the American Institute for Medical and Biological Engineering, Biomedical Engineering Society, American Institute of Chemical Engineers, American Association for the Advancement of Science, Materials Research Society, and American Academy of Arts and Sciences. He is an engineer, inventor, and entrepreneur.

== Early life ==
Ameer was born in Panama. He immigrated to the United States with his brother in 1988 where he settled in New York City. Later on, he moved to Texas where he began attending Collin College and the University of Texas at Austin where he majored in chemical engineering. Ameer was an intern at Hoechst Celanese and a summer operator at Shell Oil Company. He earned his Sc.D. in chemical engineering at the Massachusetts Institute of Technology where he studied with biotechnology pioneer Robert Langer. Following the degree, he pursued postdoctoral studies at MIT and the Department of Pathology of Harvard University where he worked with Hidde Ploegh and William Harmon.

== Research ==
In 2018, Ameer's team developed a regenerative bandage which is designed to heal diabetic foot ulcers. The bandage is a liquid that upon contact with the injured tissue turns to a gel.

In 2018, he helped established the Center for Advanced Regenerative Engineering (CARE) and currently serves as its director. Vadim Backman, Nathan C. Gianneschi, Mark Hersam, Chad Mirkin, Milan Mrksich, Teri W. Odom, Susan Quaggin, John A. Rogers, and Clyde Yancy are associated with CARE.

== Fellowships and awards ==
- 2004: Awarded the Arnold and Mabel Beckman Foundation Young Investigators Award
- 2006: Awarded the National Science Foundation CAREER Award
- 2009: Fellow of the American Institute for Medical and Biological Engineering
- 2014: Fellow of the Biomedical Engineering Society
- 2017: Founding board member of the Regenerative Engineering Society
- 2017: Elected fellow of the American Institute of Chemical Engineers
- 2018: Received the "Key to the City", Panama City, Panama
- 2018: Elected fellow of the American Association for the Advancement of Science
- 2019: Martin E. And G. Gertrude G. Walder Award for Research Excellence
- 2019: Fellow of the National Academy of Inventors
- 2020: Awarded the Clemson Award for Contributions to the Literature by the Society for Biomaterials
- 2021: Fellow of the Materials Research Society
- 2021: Elected to the National Academy of Medicine
- 2022: Awarded the Technology Innovation and Development Award by the Society For Biomaterials
- 2023: Elected fellow of the American Academy of Arts and Sciences
