= SFFILM =

SFFILM, formerly known as The San Francisco Film Society, is a nonprofit arts organization located in San Francisco, California, that presents year-round programs and events in film exhibition, media education, and filmmaker services. The San Francisco Film Society rebranded as SFFILM in 2017. Leadership for each of the SFFILM's areas of activity is currently provided by Executive Director Anne Lai and Director of Programming Jessie Fairbanks.

== Exhibition ==
SFFILM presents more than 300 films annually through various festivals, series and individual screenings.

=== San Francisco International Film Festival ===
Running for 11 days each spring, the San Francisco International Film Festival (SFFILM Festival) was founded in 1957 by San Francisco theater operator Irving "Bud" Levin, who had attended film festivals in Cannes and Venice and decided it was time for the United States to have its own. The San Francisco International Film Festival is among the longest running film festivals in the Americas. The SFFILM Festival celebrated its 50th anniversary in 2007.

== Education ==
SFFILM's Education programs serve more than 11,000 students and teachers every year, from kindergarten through college, to develop media literacy, cultural awareness, global understanding and a lifelong appreciation of cinema. Since its launch in 1991, the SFFILM Youth Education program has reached a total of more than 95,000 Bay Area schoolchildren and 3,000 teachers from more than 350 educational institutions. All programs are designed to meet the Visual and Performing Arts Content Standards for California public schools.

== Other programs ==
=== FilmHouse Residencies ===
FilmHouse provides 4,800 square feet of office space free of charge to narrative and documentary filmmakers working at any stage of production.

=== SFFILM / Kenneth Rainin Foundation Filmmaking Grants ===
Awarded twice annually through a partnership between SFFILM and the Kenneth Rainin Foundation, the SFFILM/KRF Filmmaking Grants are open to filmmakers of narrative feature films that have a significant economic or professional impact on the Bay Area filmmaking community.

=== SFFILM Documentary Film Fund ===
A grant awarded annually to documentary feature films in postproduction.
