= Liquid crystalline elastomer =

Liquid crystal elastomers (LCEs) are slightly crosslinked liquid crystalline polymer networks. These materials combine the entropy elasticity of an elastomer with the self-organization of the liquid crystalline phase. In liquid crystalline elastomers, the mesogens can either be part of the polymer chain (main-chain liquid crystalline elastomers) or are attached via an alkyl spacer (side-chain liquid crystalline elastomers).

Due to their actuation properties, liquid crystalline elastomers are attractive candidates for the use as artificial muscles or microrobots.

== History ==
LCE were predicted by Pierre-Gilles de Gennes in 1975 and first synthesized by Heino Finkelmann.

== Properties ==
In the temperature range of the liquid crystalline phase, the mesogen's orientation forces the polymer chains into a stretched conformation. Heating the sample above the clearing temperature destroys this orientation and the polymer backbone can relax into (the more favored) random coil conformation. That can lead to a macroscopic, reversible deformation. Good actuation requires a good alignment of the domains' directors before cross-linking. This can be achieved by: stretching of the prepolymerized sample, photo-alignment layers, magnetic or electric fields and microfluidics.

=== Mechanical Properties ===
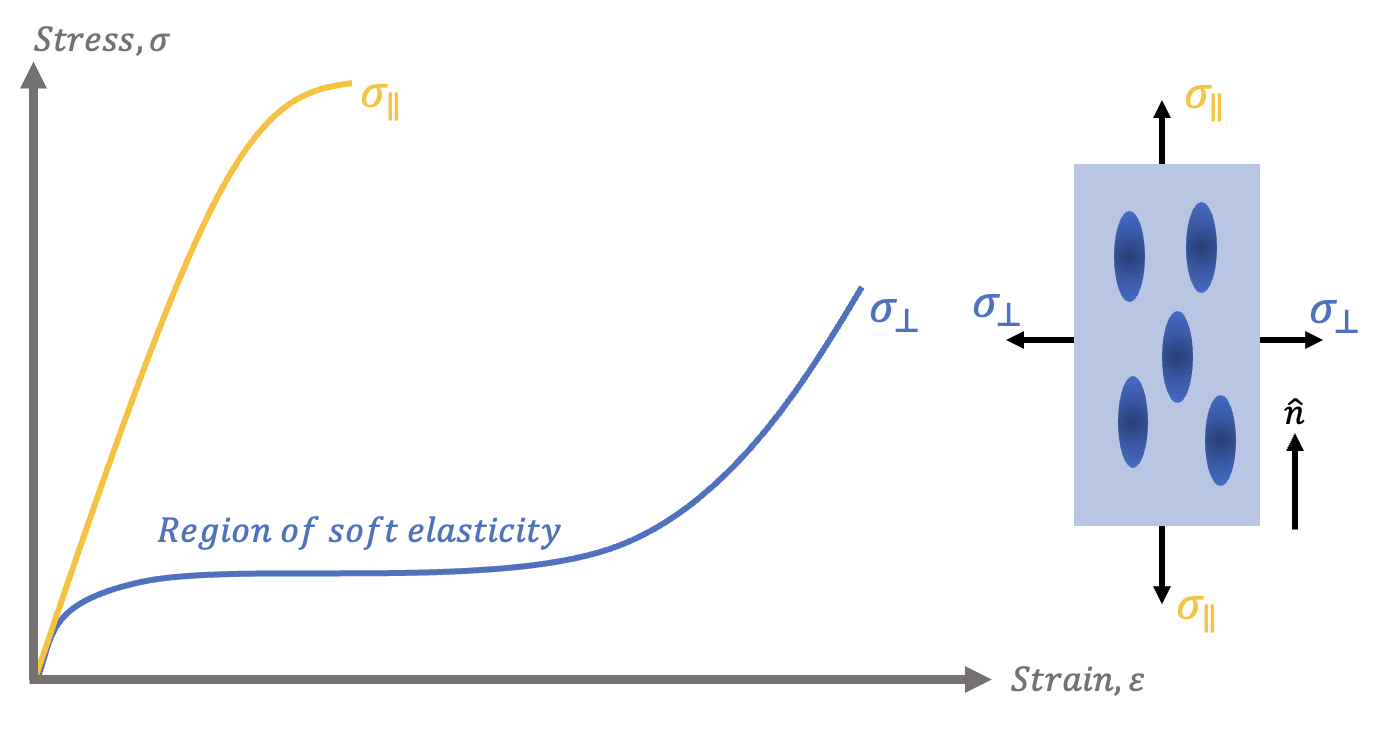
Stress-strain curve of an LCE stretch in a direction parallel ($\sigma_\parallel$) and perpendicular ($\sigma_\perp$) to its director ($\widehat{n}$). Soft elasticity is exhibited in LCEs stretched perpendicular to $\widehat{n}$.

==== Soft Elasticity ====
Because of their anisotropy, the mechanical response of aligned nematic LCEs varies depending upon the direction of applied stress. When stress is applied along the direction of alignment (parallel to the director, $\widehat{n}$), the strain responds in a linear fashion, with a slope dictated by the material's Young's modulus. This linear stress-strain behavior continues until the material reaches its yield stress, at which point it may neck or strain harden before eventually failing. The shape of the stress-strain curve for LCEs stretched parallel to their aligned direction matches that of most classical rubbers and can be described using treatments such as rubber elasticity.

In contrast, when stress is applied perpendicular to the direction of alignment, the strain behavior exhibits a drastically different response. For an unconstrained LCE, after an initial region where the stress-strain response matches that of classical rubbers, the material exhibits a large plateau where near-constant stress leads to ever-increasing strain. The term "soft elasticity" describes this large plateau region. After a critical strain is reached in this region, the stress-strain response returns to that of LCEs stretched in a direction parallel to their director.

The theory used to describe soft elasticity first arose to explain experimental observations of the phenomena in unconstrained LCEs that reoriented in the presence of an external electric field. The theory of soft elasticity states that when an LCE is stretched in a direction perpendicular to its alignment direction, its chains rotate and reorient to align in the direction of applied stress. Assuming that the LCE chains are allowed to freely move in all three dimensions, this reorientation occurs without a change in the elastic free energy of the system. This implies that there is no energy barrier to the rotation of the LCE chains, meaning that zero-stress would be required to fully reorient them.

Experimentally, a small but non-zero stress is required to induce soft elasticity and achieve this chain rotation. This deviation from the theoretical prediction arises due to the fact that real LCEs are not truly free in all three dimensions, and are instead geometrically restricted by neighboring chains. As a result, some small, finite stress is necessary in experimental systems to induce chain reorientation. Once the chain has fully rotated and is aligned parallel to the direction of applied stress, the subsequent stress-strain response is again described by that of rubber elasticity.

Soft elasticity has also been exploited to develop materials with unique and useful properties. By controlling the local liquid crystal alignment in an LCE, films with spatially varying mechanical anisotropy can be fabricated. When strained, different regions of these chemically homogeneous films stretch to different extents as a result of the relative orientation of the director to the applied stress. This has the effect of localizing deformation to predetermined regions. This predictable deformation is useful because it allows for the design of soft electronic devices that are globally compliant but locally stiff, ensuring important components do not break when the film is deformed.

==== Actuation ====
Upon transitioning from a liquid crystalline phase to an isotropic (orientationally disordered) phase, or vice versa, an LCE sample will spontaneously deform into a different shape. For example, if a nematic LCE transitions to its isotropic state, it will undergo contraction parallel to its director and expansion in the perpendicular plane. Any stimulus that drives the ordered ⇔ disordered phase transition can induce such actuation (or 'activation'). A patterned director field thus allows an LCE sample to morph into a radically different shape upon stimulation, returning to its original shape when the stimulus is removed. Due to its reversibility, large strain, and the potential to prescribe extremely complex shape changes, this shape morphing effect has attracted much interest as a potential tool for creating soft machines such as actuators or robots. As a simple example, consider a thin disk-shaped LCE sheet with a 'concentric-circles' (everywhere azimuthal) in-plane director pattern. Upon heating to the isotropic state, the disk will rise into a cone, which can be used to lift a weight thousands of times the weight of the LCE itself.

=== Azobenzenes ===
Beside the thermal deformation of a sample, a light-responsive actuation can be obtained for samples by incorporating azobenzenes in the liquid crystalline phase. The phase transition temperature of an azo-liquid crystalline elastomer can be reduced due to the trans-cis isomerization of the azobenzenes during UV-irradiation and thus the liquid crystalline phase can be destroyed isothermally. For liquid crystalline elastomers with a high azo-concentration, a light-responsive change of the sample's length of up to 40% could be observed.

== Applications ==
LCE have been examined for use as a light-weight energy absorption material. Tilted slabs of LCE were attached to stiff materials, approximating a honeycomb lattice. Arranged in multiple layers, allowed the material to buckle at different rates on impact, efficiently dissipating energy across the structure. Increasing the number of layers increased absorption capacity.
