= Jayaraj Rajagopal =

Indian-American scientist

Jayaraj Rajagopal (born 1969) is an Indian-American physician-scientist. He is the Bernard and Mildred Kayden MGH Research Institute Chair and Professor of Medicine at Harvard Medical School. He founded and serves as the Chief of the Stanbury Physician-Scientist Pathway at the Massachusetts General Hospital Department of Medicine. His laboratory focuses on epithelial biology, lung stem cell biology, regenerative biology, and lung diseases.

== Education and training ==
Rajagopal received his undergraduate degree summa cum laude in biochemical sciences from Harvard College, with Hoopes and Henderson Prizes for his work with Jack Szostak and Jennifer Doudna concerning the mechanism of ribozyme catalysis. He then received his MD degree from Harvard Medical School and trained in Internal Medicine at Massachusetts General Hospital, where he served as Chief Medical Resident and completed subspecialty training in Pulmonary and Critical Care Medicine. After finishing his medical training, he joined Doug Melton's laboratory for postdoctoral studies. While there, he began his work studying the development of the lung.

== Research ==
Rajagopal's research centers on the use of stem cell biology and developmental biology to reframe the cellular basis of lung physiology and disease. He, alongside Darrell Kotton, described the first protocols to direct the differentiation of pluripotent stem cells to airway epithelium. His laboratory then made a fundamental contribution to the field of cellular plasticity when he discovered that a fully mature functional murine or human cell can durably dedifferentiate into a stem cell. His lab also demonstrated that a stem cell can serve as a niche for its own daughter cells, extending the fundamental concept of the niche first described by Ray Schofield. He and Aviv Regiv discovered pulmonary ionocytes and airway hillocks by marrying developmental and computational biology through the use of single cell sequencing technology.

== Select honors and awards ==
- Outstanding Young Investigator Award, International Society for Stem Cell Research (2016)
- Howard Hughes Medical Institute Faculty Scholars Award, Howard Hughes Medical Institute (2016)
- MGH Research Scholar Award, Massachusetts General Hospital (2014)
- Robertson Investigator Award, New York Stem Cell Foundation (2014)
- Maroni Research Scholar Award, Massachusetts General Hospital (2014)
- Martin Research Prize for Fundamental (Basic) Research, Massachusetts General Hospital (2014)
- Lawrence J. Henderson Prize in Biochemical Sciences, Harvard College (1990)
- Thomas T. Hoopes Prize for Outstanding Scholarly Work or Research, Harvard College (1990)
