= Valentina Greco =

Italian-born biologist

- Born: Palermo, Italy
- Education: University of Palermo European Molecular Biology Laboratory/Max Planck Institute of Molecular Cell Biology and Genetics
- Spouse: Antonio J. Giraldez
- Children: 2
- Scientific career
- Doctoral advisor: Suzanne Eaton
- Other academic advisors: Elaine Fuchs

Valentina Greco is an Italian-born biologist who teaches at the Yale School of Medicine as the Carolyn Walch Slayman Professor of Genetics and is an associate professor in the Cell Biology and Dermatology departments. Her research focuses on the role of skin stem cells in tissue regeneration.

== Personal life ==
Valentino Greco was born in Palermo, Italy, where she lived through her undergraduate program. After being denied admission to the graduate school at the University of Palermo, she was encouraged by her friend Eugenia Piddini to apply to the graduate program at the European Molecular Biology Laboratory. Upon completion of her PhD, Greco moved to the United States and completed her postdoctoral work. She eventually decided to start her own lab, using a high-risk/high-reward approach alongside another Yale principal investigator, Ann Haberman.

Greco is married to fellow Yale faculty member Antonio J. Giraldez, and they have two children, Lola and Gael.

== Education ==
Greco received her undergraduate degree in Molecular Biology at the University of Palermo, Italy. In the final two years of her undergraduate program, Greco studied tumor suppressor genes in mitotic cell division in the lab of Aldo di Leonardo. Greco then began graduate school in 1998 and received her PhD in 2002 from the European Molecular Biology Laboratory/Max Planck Institute of Molecular Cell Biology and Genetics (EMBL/MPI-CBG) in Heidelberg, Germany working with advisor Suzanne Eaton on tissue growth mechanisms. She did her postdoctoral studies at Rockefeller University with Elaine Fuchs studying the mechanisms for stem cell activation during hair regeneration.

== Research ==
The Greco lab currently studies stem cells in organ regeneration, with the goal of determining how cells are maintained despite mutation, cellular turnover, and injury. Greco focuses on the mammalian hair follicle in mice to study cellular homeostasis, wound repair, and cancer. Her lab uses techniques such as in vivo imaging to track individual stem cells over time and understand how these cells act during homeostasis and respond to tissue injury. Her lab has worked extensively on the importance of the spatial organization of stem cell niches and shown that these stem cells coordinate their differentiation and migration and can clear away dead cells and tumor-like growths, repairing significant faults in tissue structure.

Greco's research has led to notable discoveries in cell regeneration, namely the mechanism of hair and skin regeneration. Her findings show that hair germ cells are obtained from bulge stem cells, as well as suggest that hair germ cells initiate hair regeneration and stem cells drive the process.

In more recent work, the Greco Lab uses stimulated emission depletion (STED) microscopy to gain three-dimensional images of cellular structures, and have been using this imaging to examine the brains of mice. In her work with hair follicles and homeostasis, Greco has also determined a link between the lymphatic vessels of the skin and hair follicle development and organization. The ongoing work of the Greco lab is looking to determine how skin reacts to mutations and the contribution of different tissue types to homeostasis.

== Awards and honors ==
- ISSCR Momentum Award (2021)
- William Montagna Lectureship at the Society of Investigative Dermatology (SID) annual conference (2020)
- Yale Postdoctoral Mentoring Award (2019)
- National Institutes of Health Director's Pioneer Award (2019)
- Yale Mentoring Award in the Natural Sciences (2018)
- Class of '61 Award, Yale Cancer Center (2017)
- HHMI Faculty Scholar Award (2017)
- Glenn Award for Research in Biological Mechanisms of Aging (2017)
- Early Career Award, ASCB (2016)
- Edward Mallinckrodt Jr. Foundation Scholar (2015)
- Robertson Stem Cell Investigator Award, New York Stem Cell Foundation (2015)
- Outstanding Young Investigator Award, ISSCR (2014)
- Dermatology Foundation Career Development Award (2012)
- American Skin Association Award (2011)
