= Wendy Henderson =

American nurse practitioner, scientist and academic administrator

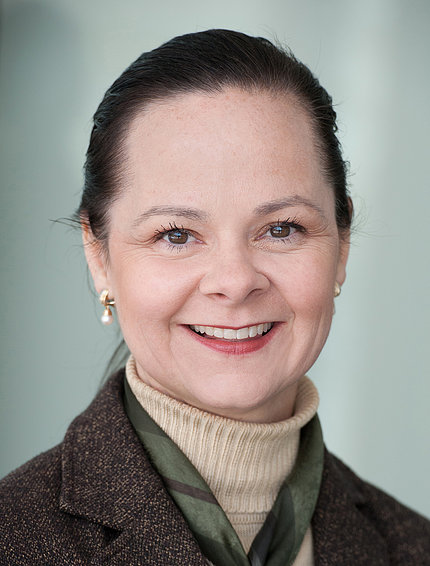
- Education: University of Pittsburgh
- Scientific career
- Fields: Nursing
- Workplaces: National Institute of Nursing Research; University of Connecticut

Wendy A. Henderson is an American nurse practitioner, scientist, and academic administrator working as the director of the Center of Nursing Scholarship and Innovation at the University of Connecticut. She was previously a clinical investigator and lab chief of the National Institute of Nursing Research digestive disorders unit. Henderson is a Fellow of the American Academy of Nursing.

== Education ==
Henderson earned a M.S.N. from University of Pittsburgh School of Nursing in 1999. She completed a patient safety fellowship, through the Jewish Healthcare Foundation. In 1999, she became a certified registered nurse practitioner with a subspecialty in pediatric gastroenterology, hepatology, and nutrition. In 2007, Henderson obtained her Ph.D. in nursing from the University of Pittsburgh, where she was also a clinical and translational science institute fellow. The same year, she joined the National Institute of Nursing Research (NINR) as a postdoctoral researcher and staff scientist conducting research on the immuno-genetic mechanisms involved in symptom distress related to digestive and liver diseases.

== Career ==
Henderson was appointed as an assistant clinical investigator in 2009 and then joined the NINR tenure-track faculty in the NIH Division of Intramural Research in 2011. She was a clinical investigator and lab chief of the NINR digestive disorders unit. Her interest in symptomatology in patients with gastrointestinal and liver disorders stems from her clinical and research experience at the Children's Hospital of Pittsburgh, Pediatric Gastroenterology Department, where she served as a faculty member, nurse practitioner and research coordinator. Henderson served as a member of the Women Scientist Advisors Committee and the Intramural Program of Research on Women's Health Steering Committee. She also served as NINR's NIH Liaison for the Best Pharmaceuticals for Children Act (BPCA) and as a pediatric gastrointestinal clinical consultant at the NIH Clinical Center.

In September 2019, Henderson was appointed as the director of the Center of Nursing Scholarship and Innovation at the University of Connecticut.

=== Research ===
As a primary investigator on multiple studies at the NIH, Henderson researched brain–gut microbiota axis and chronic effects of stress on intestinal health across the lifespan. She developed the Gastrointestinal Pain Pointer (GIPP) technology to provide clinicians with a more integrated tool for GI symptom assessment—one that includes location, intensity, quality, and physiologic parameters. Through a brain–gut natural history study, Henderson also assesses brain–gut interactions in normal weight and overweight patients with chronic abdominal pain of unknown origin.

In 2018, Henderson co-invented a new patent-pending methodology to test stool rapidly at the point-of-need for infectious pathogens. The test recently won the 2018 American Gastroenterological Association Tech Summit's Shark Tank competition. Henderson developed the tool with Chang Hee Kim of GoDx under a clinical cooperative research and development agreement.

== Awards and honors ==
Henderson has received an NINR Director's Award for Innovation and Leadership. She is a Fellow of the American Academy of Nursing.

== Personal life ==
Henderson is listed by the National Institutes of Health as being of Cherokee descent.
