= NOTUM =

Protein-coding gene in the species Homo sapiens

Available structures
PDB	Ortholog search: PDBe RCSB
PDB	List of PDB id codes 4UYU, 4UYW, 4UYZ, 4UZ1, 4UZ5, 4UZ6, 4UZ7, 4UZ9, 4UZA, 4UZL, 4UZQ, 4WBH

Identifiers
- Aliases: NOTUM, hpalmitoleoyl-protein carboxylesterase
- External IDs: OMIM: 609847; MGI: 1924833; HomoloGene: 45335; GeneCards: NOTUM; OMA:NOTUM - orthologs

Gene location (Human)
Chr.	Chromosome 17 (human)
Band	17q25.3	Start	81,952,507 bp
Band	17q25.3	End	81,961,840 bp

Gene location (Mouse)
Chr.	Chromosome 11 (mouse)
Band	11|11 E2	Start	120,544,614 bp
Band	11|11 E2	End	120,552,001 bp
RNA expression pattern
Bgee	Human / Mouse (ortholog); Top expressed in: decidua; vena cava; striated muscle tissue; Skeletal muscle tissue of rectus abdominis; muscle of thigh; pylorus; thymus; right lobe of liver; nipple; mucosa of pharynx / Top expressed in: gastrula; right kidney; molar; optic chiasm; proximal tubule; lens; liver; left lobe of liver; renal pelvis; embryo; More reference expression data
BioGPS	n/a
Gene ontology
Molecular function	palmitoleyl hydrolase activity; carboxylic ester hydrolase activity; hydrolase activity; phospholipase C activity
Cellular component	extracellular region; endoplasmic reticulum lumen
Biological process	negative regulation of Wnt signaling pathway; protein depalmitoleylation; Wnt signaling pathway; negative regulation of canonical Wnt signaling pathway; post-translational protein modification
Sources:Amigo / QuickGO
Orthologs
Species	Human	Mouse
Entrez	147111	77583
Ensembl	ENSG00000185269	ENSMUSG00000042988
UniProt	Q6P988	Q8R116
RefSeq (mRNA)	NM_178493	NM_175263; NM_001382269; NM_001382270
RefSeq (protein)	NP_848588	NP_780472; NP_001369198; NP_001369199
Location (UCSC)	Chr 17: 81.95 – 81.96 Mb	Chr 11: 120.54 – 120.55 Mb
PubMed search
- Wikidata
View/Edit Human	View/Edit Mouse

Notum, palmitoleoyl-protein carboxylesterase is a protein that in humans is encoded by the NOTUM gene.
