= Mir-451 microRNA =

mir-451
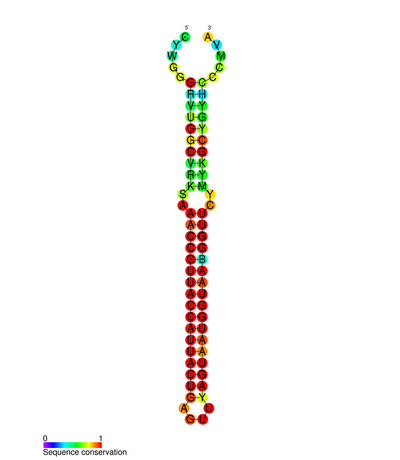
- miR-451 microRNA secondary structure and sequence conservation

Identifiers
- Symbol: mir-451
- Rfam: RF00722
- miRBase family: MIPF0000148
- OMIM: 612071

Other data
- RNA type: microRNA
- Domain(s): Eukaryota; Vertebrata
- PDB structures: PDBe

In molecular biology mir-451 microRNA is a short RNA molecule. MicroRNAs function to regulate the expression levels of other genes by several mechanisms.

miR-451 regulates the drug-transporter protein P-glycoprotein, potentially promoting resistance to the chemotherapy drug Paclitaxel.

== Applications ==
A proof-of-concept experiment has shown that miR-451, as well as mir-126 and mir-150, could be using in forensic science to distinguish between blood and saliva samples. This is made possible by different miRNA profiles of miRNAs in the different tissue types.
