= Claire Wyart =

French biophysicist and neuroscientist

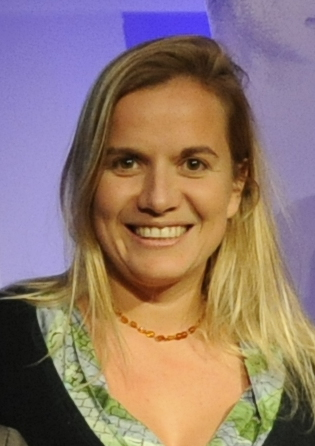
- Claire Wyart in 2013
- Born: 16 February 1977 (age 49)
- Citizenship: France
- Education: École Normale Supérieure; University of Strasbourg
- Awards: Chevalier of the Ordre National du Mérite
- Scientific career
- Fields: Neuroscience, biophysics
- Workplaces: University of California, Berkeley; Institut du cerveau et de la moelle épinière (current)
- Thesis: Dynamique de l'activité spontanée dans des réseaux de neurones hippocampiques d'architecture contrôlée en culture (2003)
- Doctoral advisor: Didier Chatenay
- Website: www.wyartlab.org

Claire Julie Liliane Wyart (born 16 February 1977) is a French neuroscientist and biophysicist, studying the circuits underlying the control of locomotion. She is a chevalier of the Ordre national du Mérite.

== Early life ==
Wyart was born into a family of scientists. Her mother, Françoise Brochard-Wyart, is a prominent French physicist and a professor at the Curie Institute. Her father, Pierre-Gilles de Gennes, was a Nobel-prize winning physicist. As their father was mostly absent, Wyart and her siblings were raised by their mother, though Claire thought of him as "the pillar who held our family together".

== Education ==
Wyart studied at the École normale supérieure in Paris. She then undertook a PhD in biophysics at the Université Louis-Pasteur (now University of Strasbourg), which she completed in 2003. Working in the lab of Didier Chatenay, she studied small networks of controlled architecture.

== Research and career ==
Wyart did five years of postdoctoral research at the University of California, Berkeley between 2005 and 2010. She worked for a year in Noam Sobel's lab, investigating the effects of smelling compounds in body secretions. She then worked in Udi Isacoff, using optogenetics — the modulation of neuronal activity using light — to study the control of behaviour in zebrafish larvae.

In 2011, she started her own lab at the Institut du cerveau et de la moelle épinière (ICM, Brain and Spine Institute) in Paris. Wyart has received international funding for her research, from bodies such as the European Research Council, the Human Frontier Science Program and the National Institutes of Health. Her team investigates how neuromodulatory pathways of the central nervous system (the brain and spinal cord) affect locomotion and posture. Her lab has three main areas of research: the effect of neuromodulation and peptide release on reticulospinal neurons, and on neurons in contact with the cerebrospinal fluid (CSF); the links between CSF and body axis formation and scoliosis; and new strategies to treat spinal cord trauma. In an interview in 2015, she explained that her aim was to understand how to reactivate motor circuits in humans.

Her lab's particular focus is ciliated neurons which contact the CSF; such neurons integrate both mechanical and chemical signals, and project onto spinal cord motor circuits. Along with brain circuits and reflexes, these neurons represent a third circuit governing locomotion. The morphology and markers expressed by these neurons, discovered in zebrafish, are conserved in other animals including mice and macaques. Wyart's team has also demonstrated that these neurons can detect the curvature of the spinal cord.

In collaboration with her former PhD student Olivier Mirat, Wyart launched ZebraZoom, a software to analyse zebrafish larvae behaviour.

She serves on the advisory board of Current Biology, on the board of directors of the FENS-Kavli Network of Excellence, and on the scientific council of the Fondation pour la Recherche Medicale (FRM).

During the COVID-19 pandemic, she collaborated with Marie-Claude Potier to develop a screening test for the virus using sputum and saliva samples.

== Science communication and outreach ==
While studying for her PhD, Wyart ran a science workshop for children twice a month at the Exploradome museum. After completing her PhD, she spent a year working for the Terma project in Nepal and India, teaching science in Tibetan schools by using practical experiments. This work was rewarded with a "Défi Jeunes" award. With her team at the ICM, she uses zebrafish larva to teach primary and middle school children the basics of development.

During the COVID-19 pandemic, Wyart and her colleague Virginie Courtier-Orgozozo launched a website showcasing advice from experts and helpful tips for the public on how to stay safe. The website was subsequently translated into multiple languages. In an article by Michael Gross published in Current Biology, she is quoted as saying: "We deeply believe that it is the role of scientists to inform society and to provide the public with cues and methodology for them to be able to make better choices and to navigate safely in our new environment that we share with the SARS-CoV2 coronavirus. We hope to inspire our colleagues around the world to join and help in this fight against both the virus' spread and misinformation for the public good."

== Awards and honours ==
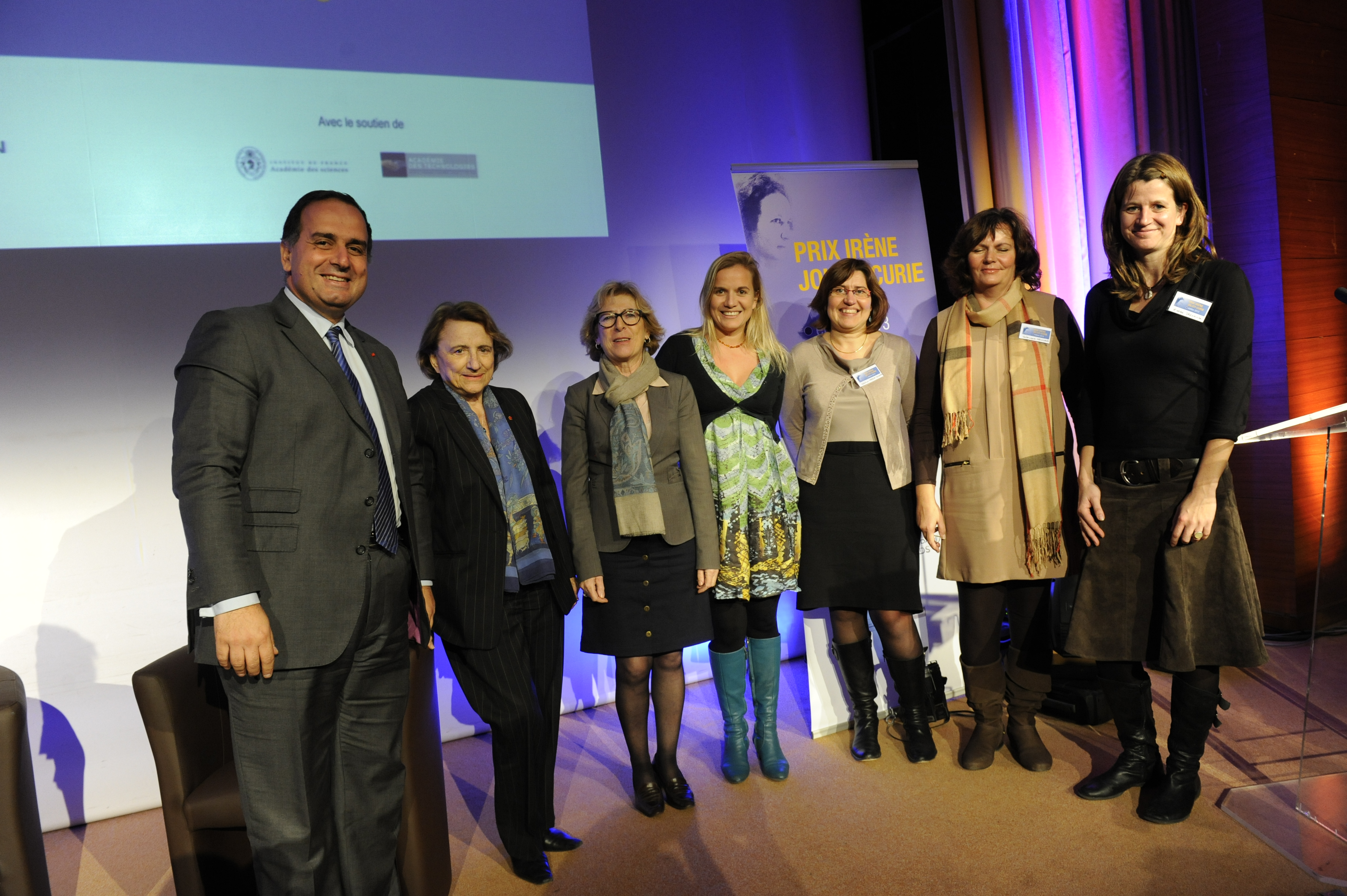
Claire Wyart, centre, receiving the Irene Joliot Curie Award in 2013.

- Best Thesis Award from the Université Louis-Pasteur Scientific Council (2004)
- "Défi Jeunes" Award for the science project Terma (2004)
- "Fondation Blancmesnil" Award for the documentary Terma (2005)
- Marie Curie Outgoing International Post-doctorate Fellowship (OIF) (2007–10)
- Society for Neuroscience Award (2009)
- Bettencourt-Schueller Foundation Award (2010)
- Fyssen Foundation Award (2010)
- Atip-Avenir Junior Team Award (2010)
- Chair of Excellence, École des Neurosciences de Paris (ENP) (2010)
- International Reintegration Grant (2011)
- Prix Émergences de la Mairie de Paris (2011)
- European Research Council Starting Grant (2012)
- Irène Joliot-Curie Young Research Award (2013)
- Human Frontier Science Program Research Grant (coordinator) (2014)
- Chevalier de l'Ordre national du Mérite (2014)
- Laureate, Fondation Schlumberger pour l'Education et la Recherche (2017)
- New York Stem Cell Foundation Robertson Neuroscience Investigator (2016)
- European Molecular Biology Organization (EMBO) Young Investigator Award (2016)
- Federation of European Neuroscience Societies (FENS) Kavli Scholar (2016-2020)
- Human Frontier Science Program Award (2018)
- Member of the European Molecular Biology Organisation (EMBO) (2019)
- Richard Lounsbery Award (2022)

== Selected publications ==
- Szobota, Stephanie, et al. « Remote control of neuronal activity with a light-gated glutamate receptor. » Neuron 54.4 (2007): 535-545.
- Wyart, Claire, et al. « Optogenetic dissection of a behavioural module in the vertebrate spinal cord. » Nature 461.7262 (2009): 407-410.
- Knowles, Roger B., et al. « Plaque-induced neurite abnormalities: implications for disruption of neural networks in Alzheimer's disease. » Proceedings of the National Academy of Sciences 96.9 (1999): 5274-5279.
- Wyart, Claire, et al. « Smelling a single component of male sweat alters levels of cortisol in women. » The Journal of Neuroscience 27.6 (2007): 1261-1265.
- Wyart, Claire, et al. « Constrained synaptic connectivity in functional mammalian neuronal networks grown on patterned surfaces. » Journal of Neuroscience Methods 117.2 (2002): 123-131.
- Del Bene, Filippo, et al. « Filtering of visual information in the tectum by an identified neural circuit. » Science 330.6004 (2010): 669-673.
- Janovjak, Harald, et al. « A light-gated, potassium-selective glutamate receptor for the optical inhibition of neuronal firing. » Nature neuroscience 13.8 (2010): 1027-1032.
- Pautot, Sophie, Claire Wyart, and Ehud Y. Isacoff. « Colloid-guided assembly of oriented 3D neuronal networks. » Nature methods 5.8 (2008): 735-740.
- Warp, Erica, et al. « Emergence of patterned activity in the developing zebrafish spinal cord.» Current Biology 22.2 (2012): 93-102.
- Del Bene, Filippo, and Claire Wyart. « Optogenetics: a new enlightenment age for zebrafish neurobiology. » Developmental neurobiology 72.3 (2012): 404-414.
