= Françoise Brochard-Wyart =

French physicist

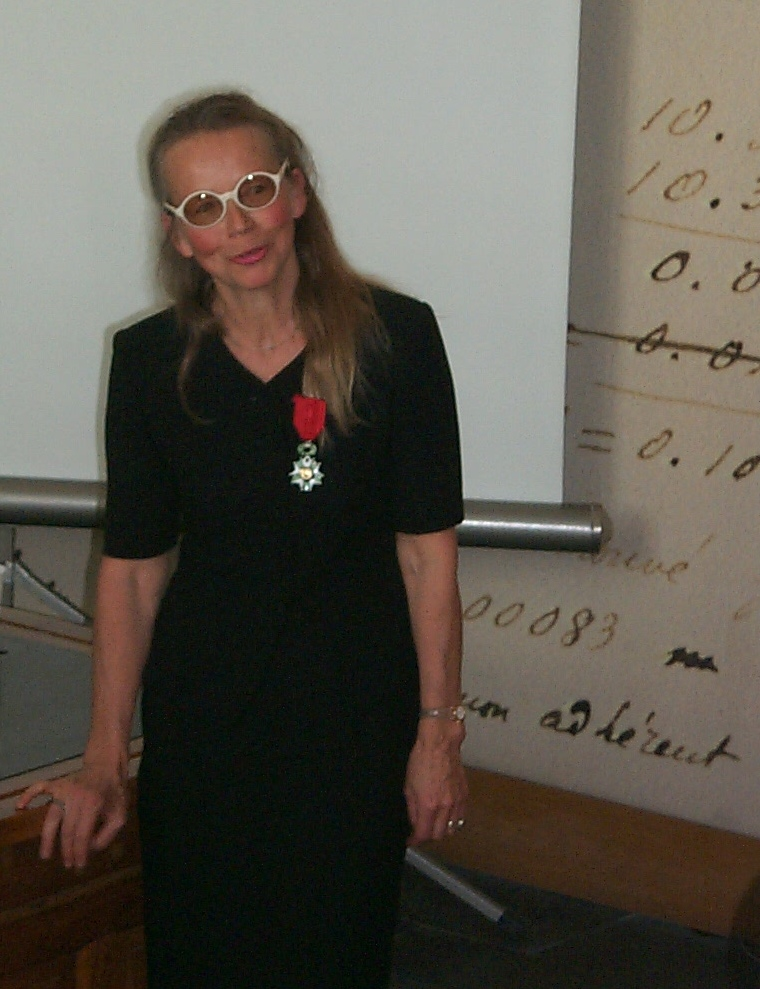
- Françoise Brochard-Wyart
- Born: 1944 (age 81–82)
- Citizenship: France
- Education: École normale supérieure de Cachan; Collège de France
- Children: 6, including Claire Wyart
- Scientific career
- Fields: Physics, Physical chemistry
- Thesis: (1974)
- Doctoral advisor: Pierre-Gilles de Gennes

Françoise Brochard-Wyart (born 1944) is a French theoretical physicist of soft matter. Currently, she is a emeritus professor of physical chemistry of Sorbonne University at the Curie Institute in Paris.

== Biography ==
Born in Saint-Étienne, Brochard-Wyart studied at École normale supérieure de Cachan from 1964 to 1968 and obtained a degree in physics. Following her degree she studied for a PhD in liquid crystals under the supervision of Pierre-Gilles de Gennes. She obtained her PhD in 1974.

Following her PhD she went on to study the dynamics of polymers at the Collège de France. In 1986 she was made a professor of physical chemistry at Pierre-and-Marie-Curie University. Here she focused her research on phenomena involving mixing and on the physics of Interfaces. In 1991 she joined the Curie Institute and began research on biophysics. She is a member of Institut Universitaire de France.

She has written an autobiographical article titled "A Tour of My Soft Matter Garden: From Shining Globules and Soap Bubbles to Cell Aggregates".

She has four children with the Nobel Laureate physicist Pierre-Gilles de Gennes, including the neuroscientist Claire Wyart.

== Honors and awards ==
Prix Jean Ricard from the French Physical Society (Société française de physique) in 1998.

A special mention for the Prix Roberval in 2007 for Capillarity and Wetting Phenomena -Droplets, bubbles, pearls and waves, co-authored with Pierre-Gilles de Gennes and David Quéré.

== Publications ==
- 2009: (with J. Bok & J.Prost) De Gennes' Impact in Science, Imperial College Press, ISBN 9814280631
- 2010: (with P.-G. de Gennes & D. Quéré) Capillarity and Wetting Phenomena -Droplets, bubbles, pearls and waves, ISBN 978-0-387-21656-0
