= Mir-430 microRNA precursor family =

miR-430

Identifiers
- Symbol: mir-430
- Rfam: RF01413
- miRBase family: MIPF0000003

Other data
- RNA type: microRNA
- Domain: Eukaryota;
- PDB structures: PDBe

In molecular biology mir-430 microRNA is a short RNA molecule. MicroRNAs function to regulate the expression levels of other genes by several mechanisms.

== See also ==
- MicroRNA
