= Eun Ji Chung =

American biomedical engineer

- Education: Scripps College; Northwestern University
- Scientific career
- Fields: Biomedical engineering
- Workplaces: University of Southern California
- Doctoral advisor: Guillermo Ameer

Eun Ji Chung is an American biomedical engineer. She is an associate professor at the USC Viterbi School of Engineering.

== Life ==
Chung earned a B.A. in molecular biology with honors from Scripps College in 2006 under advisor Emily Wiley. She received a Ph.D. in biomedical engineering from Northwestern University in 2011. Guillermo Ameer was her doctoral advisor. She was a postdoctoral fellow at the Pritzker School of Molecular Engineering at the University of Chicago under Matthew Tirrell.

Chung is an associate professor of biomedical engineering at the USC Viterbi School of Engineering. Chung's research focuses on nanotechnology and biomaterials for biomedical applications. Chung has been recognized nationally for her work and received the NIH K99/R00 Pathway to Independence Award and the NIH Director's New Innovator Award. She was elected a fellow of the Biomedical Engineering Society in 2023 and the American Institute for Medical and Biological Engineering in 2025.
