= Lauren O'Connell (scientist) =

American neurobiologist

- Born: Texas, U.S.
- Education: Tarrant County College; Cornell University
- Scientific career
- Workplaces: Harvard University; Stanford University
- Thesis: Evolution of neuroendocrine mechanisms regulating adaptive behavior (2011)

Lauren O'Connell is an American neurobiologist and associate professor in the Department of Biology at Stanford University, specializing in the intersections of behavioral neuroscience, ecology, and evolution. Her research considers how animals handle challenges in their environment. She received a L'Oréal-USA For Women in Science fellowship in 2015.

== Early life and education ==
O'Connell is from rural Texas. She grew up on a goat farm in a family of six. She has said that growing up on a farm and working with animals made her enthusiastic about science. After high school, she attended Tarrant County College, where she earned an Associate of Arts in Natural Sciences in 2004 and she spent two years before joining Cornell University. At Cornell, she became interested in animal behavior from a mechanistic perspective. After completing her undergraduate degree, she moved to the University of Texas at Austin, where she studied social networks in Cichlid fish with Hans Hofmann. She earned a Ph.D. in Cellular and Molecular Biology in 2011. Her doctoral research explored neural and molecular mechanisms underlying social behavior in vertebrates.

In 2014, she won a L'Oréal USA For Women in Science Fellowship and she also won a Changing Face of STEM Mentorship award in 2016.

== Career ==
After completing her Ph.D., O'Connell was appointed a Bauer Fellow at Harvard University's Faculty of Arts and Sciences, where she established her independent research laboratory at the age of 27.

In 2017, she joined the Department of Biology at Stanford University as an Assistant Professor and was later promoted to associate professor.

At Stanford, O'Connell has continued to lead pioneering research on amphibians, focusing on the ecological and evolutionary implications of their behaviors and physiological traits. She has also played a prominent role in mentoring young scientists and promoting diversity within academia.

She had become interested in the evolution of parental care in an animal clade that had a lot of variation in reproductive strategies. During her postdoctoral research, she founded the “Little Froggers School Program”, a scheme which supports K–12 teachers in learning more about amphibians.

== Research ==
Her research considers genetic and environmental contributions to the behavior of poison frogs. O'Connell noted that maternal behavior has only evolved once in mammals, and wanted to identify whether there were different ways to build a maternal brain. She identified that mother frogs transfer their poisons to their offspring in an effort to provide some chemical defences to their young tadpoles.

Her lab has demonstrated that poison frogs acquire their toxins from their diet, particularly from ants and mites. This dietary dependency highlights the impact of habitat destruction, as declining habitat quality reduces the availability of these toxin-rich prey, diminishing the frogs' chemical defenses and increasing their vulnerability to predators. Additionally, early findings in her lab suggested that ion channel mutations could be key to poison resistance in frogs.

In her work on parental behaviors, O’Connell's research has revealed that the neural circuits promoting parenting in poison frogs are similar in both males and females. In species where males predominantly provide care, females can assume parenting roles when males are absent, demonstrating the plasticity of these neural mechanisms. Notably, galanin neurons are particularly active in parenting behaviors in frogs, findings consistent with similar studies in mammals such as mice. Her lab has also uncovered species-specific differences in the regulation of parenting behaviors, with South American and Malagasy poison frogs displaying distinct neural adaptations.

== Awards and honors ==
- 2020 Mcknight Scholar Award
- 2019 New Innovator Award, National Institutes of Health
- 2019 Kavli Fellow of the National Academy of Sciences
- 2016 Changing Face of STEM Mentorship award
- 2018 Frank A. Beach Early Career Award
- 2018 Hellman Faculty Fellow
- 2014 L'Oréal-USA For Women in Science Fellowship
- 2013 Capranica Prize, International Society for Neuroethology
- 2011 Young Investigator Award, Society for Social Neuroscience

== Selected publications ==
- Lauren A O'Connell; Hans A. Hofmann (2011). "The vertebrate mesolimbic reward system and social behavior network: a comparative synthesis". The Journal of Comparative Neurology. 519 (18): 3599–3639. doi:10.1002/cne.22735. PMID 21800319. Wikidata Q37907986.
- Lauren A O'Connell; Hans A. Hofmann (2012). "Evolution of a vertebrate social decision-making network". Science. 336 (6085): 1154–1157. doi:10.1126/science.1218889. PMID 22654056. Wikidata Q48486705.
- Catherine Dulac; Lauren A O'Connell; Zheng Wu (2014). "Neural control of maternal and paternal behaviors". Science. 345 (6198): 765–770. doi:10.1126/science.1253291. PMC 4230532. PMID 25124430. Wikidata Q34433621.
