= The Kenneth Rainin Foundation =

- Formation: 2009
- Type: Foundation
- Purpose: funds Bay Area Arts, Oakland Education and international research for Inflammatory Bowel Disease
- Headquarters: Oakland, California
- Region served: Nationwide
- Leader: Jennifer Rainin, Ph.D.
- Staff: <50
- Volunteers: 0
- Website: krfoundation.org

The Kenneth Rainin Foundation is an American family run foundation based in Oakland, California. The foundation funds early childhood education programs in Oakland, various arts programs around the San Francisco Bay Area, and research into inflammatory bowel disease.

== History ==
The Kenneth Rainin Foundation was founded in 2007 by Kenneth Rainin, founder of Rainin Instrument Company, which sold a mainstream brand of laboratory pipettes.

Rainin donated a substantial part of his fortune to a variety of causes during his lifetime. He supported the San Francisco Ballet, where he served as chairman of the executive committee. Rainin also supported research at University of California, San Francisco and Cleveland Clinic Foundation into the causes of Crohn's disease and colitis and other intestinal disorders. He founded the Kenneth Rainin Foundation in support of his philanthropic interests and after his death in 2007, the foundation became the main beneficiary of his estate.

The foundation is a family run organization. Jennifer Rainin, Kenneth Rainin's daughter, has served as CEO since its public launch in 2009.

== Grants ==
=== Arts ===
The foundation provides support for small and mid-sized performing and multidisciplinary arts organizations in the Bay Area. In the past groups and organizations such the American Conservatory Theater, Magic Theatre, and Shotgun Players have received grants from the Foundation. With funds from the Rainin Foundation, SFFILM (formerly known as San Francisco Film Society) administers a grants program to support narrative feature films that explore contemporary social issues. In addition to financial assistance, recipients receive various benefits through SFFILM's filmmaker services programs. Since 2009, more than $3.5 million has been awarded, recipients include Ryan Coogler's Fruitvale Station and Benh Zeitlin's Beasts of the Southern Wild''.

In 2013, the Rainin Foundation collaborated with Northern California Community Loan Fund (NCCLF) to create the Community Arts Stabilization Trust (a nonprofit real estate holding company that purchases property in the Bay Area and provides leases for the exclusive use of arts organizations.) The Rainin Foundation awarded $5 million in seed funding to launch the organization. Community Arts Stabilization Trust successes to date include purchasing and renovating spaces for two San Francisco arts organizations, the Luggage Store Gallery, a multidisciplinary art gallery, and CounterPulse, an interdisciplinary dance company.

The foundation launched its Open Spaces Program in 2016 to support temporary, site specific public art projects in Oakland and San Francisco. In December 2016, Oakland Mayor Libby Schaaf announced that the William and Flora Hewlett Foundation and Rainin Foundation would provide funds for a financial and technical assistance program to help arts organizations facing displacement in Oakland. In May 2020, a coalition of private donors, foundations, and the City of Oakland launched a relief fund with $625,000 for artists and culture workers living in Alameda and Contra Costa Counties. The Kenneth Rainin Foundation made the announcement, noting that at least $300,000 of the fund would be dedicated specifically to residents of Oakland.

=== Education ===
The aim of the Rainin Foundation's education program is to improve literacy and reading for young children and students in the Oakland Unified School District up to third grade. The foundation implements SEEDS of Learning in the Oakland Unified School District. Originally developed at the University of Minnesota, SEEDS of Learning is a professional development program through which the foundation supplies resources and strategies to educators, parents, and caregivers to build social, emotional, language and literacy tools for young children to prepare them for success in kindergarten. The program served approximately 1,300 students in the 2016–2017 school year.

In 2014, the program piloted 'Talk Read Sing', a public awareness campaign to distribute materials to encourage parents and caregivers to talk, read, and sing to infants and toddlers to promote early literacy development. The foundation partnered with Bay Area Council Children's Hospital Oakland, Goodby, Silverstein & Partners and others on the project. The foundation also partnered with NORC at the University of Chicago to conduct a survey of over 400 low-income families in Oakland, including understanding parenting behaviors and reading habits.

=== Health ===
The Foundation's health program supports projects aimed at diagnosing, treating, and ultimately curing IBD; the program is open to researchers at all levels and from any scientific discipline. The health program also provides longer-term support for previous grantees and hosts an annual symposium aimed at accelerating innovations to improve treatments for IBD. Recipients of grants include research institutions, such as Washington University in St. Louis, Weill Cornell Medicine, Pennsylvania State University, Princeton University, Stanford University School of Medicine, and University of Texas at Austin.

In 2017, the Kenneth Rainin Foundation launched an online resource to inspire collaboration in IBD research. The website features the work of dedicated investigators and highlights projects and ideas, with the goal of opening opportunities for researchers and clinicians to connect and nurture discoveries.

In April 2018, the Helmsley Trust and the Kenneth Rainin Foundation co-hosted a workshop for researchers and stakeholders to discuss the role of diet, nutrition, and the microbiome in preventing and treating inflammatory bowel disease (IBD). Key findings from the workshop with an emphasis on gaps in knowledge, potential answers to address these gaps, and priorities for future research were included a summary report, Evolving Research: Diet, the Microbiome, and Inflammatory Bowel Disease.
