= Lindy McBride =

American assistant professor

Carolyn (Lindy) McBride is an associate professor who holds a joint position with the Princeton Neuroscience Institute and the Department of Ecology and Evolutionary Biology at Princeton University. She works on understanding the genetic and neural basis for behavioral evolution through the study of mosquitoes. She has received several early investor awards for her work on genetics, most notably the Rosalind Franklin Young Investor Award in 2016, the Pew Scholars Award in 2015, and the Searle Scholars award in 2016.

McBride received her B.A. in biology from Williams College in 1998 and her Ph.D. in Population Biology from the University of California, Davis in 2008.
