= Charles M. Lieber =

American chemist (born 1959)

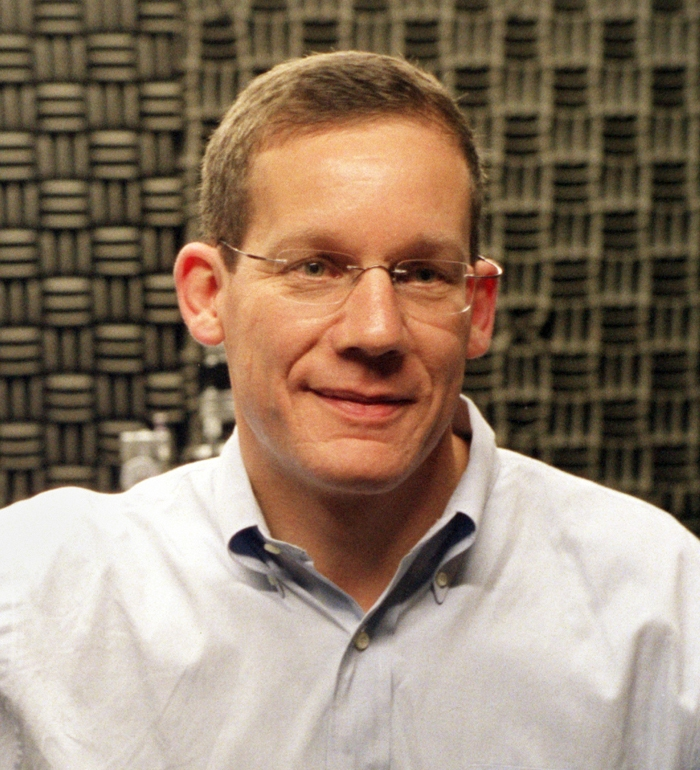
- Born: 1959 (age 66–67); Philadelphia, Pennsylvania, U.S.
- Scientific career
- Education: Franklin & Marshall College; Stanford University
- Known for: Nanomaterials synthesis and assembly Nanostructure characterization Nanoelectronics and nanophotonics Nanobioelectronics
- Awards: Wolf Prize in Chemistry (2012); MRS Von Hippel Award (2016)
- Fields: Nanoscience and nanotechnology Chemistry; Materials physics Neuroscience
- Workplaces: Harvard University; Columbia University; Wuhan University of Technology; Tsinghua University
- Doctoral students: Hongjie Dai; Xiangfeng Duan; Yu Huang; Philip Kim; Peidong Yang; Latha Venkataraman; Yi Cui
- Criminal information
- Status: Convicted
- Motive: Professional accolades
- Conviction: December 21, 2021
- Criminal charges: Two counts each of making false statements to federal authorities (18 USC § 1001), filing false tax returns (26 USC § 7206) and failing to report foreign income (26 USC § 5322)
- Penalty: Six months house arrest, $50,000 fine, back taxes

Details
- Date apprehended: January 28, 2020

Charles M. Lieber (born 1959) is an American chemist, inventor, nanotechnologist, and writer. In 2011, Lieber was named the leading chemist in the world for the decade 2000–2010 by Thomson Reuters, based on the impact of his scientific publications. He is known for his contributions to the synthesis, assembly and characterization of nanoscale materials and nanodevices, the application of nanoelectronic devices in biology, and as a mentor to numerous leaders in nanoscience.

Lieber, formerly a professor at Harvard University, has published over 400 papers in peer-reviewed journals and has edited and contributed to many books on nanoscience. Until 2020, he was the chair of the department of chemistry and chemical biology, and held a joint appointment in that department and the school of engineering and applied sciences as the Joshua and Beth Friedman University Professor. He is the principal inventor on over fifty issued US patents and applications. In 2012, Lieber was awarded the Wolf Prize in Chemistry in a special ceremony held at the Israeli Knesset.

In 2018, the US government began its investigation of Lieber as part of the China Initiative, a program established by the Department of Justice under Trump administration to investigate academic espionage at American universities. Lieber has been on paid leave from Harvard since his arrest in 2020 as a result of his criminal charges and a lymphoma diagnosis. In December 2021, Lieber was convicted of six charges, including two counts of making false statements regarding his participation in the Chinese Research Program, as well as four counts of filing false tax returns.

In April 2025, Lieber joined Tsinghua Shenzhen International Graduate School (SIGS), a graduate school of Tsinghua University in Shenzhen, China as a full-time chair professor.. He has also been employed as SMART Investigator at the newly-established Shenzhen Medical Academy of Research and Translation (SMART). Lieber has founded Institute for Brain Research, Advanced Interfaces and Neurotechnologies (i-BRAIN) with the support from Tsinghua SIGS and SMART. It is focused on developing transformative brain-computer interfaces (BCIs) that blur the distinction between electronics and the brain.

== Early life, education, and career ==
Lieber was born in Philadelphia, Pennsylvania in 1959 and "spent much of his childhood building – and breaking – stereos, cars and model airplanes." Lieber is Jewish.

Lieber obtained a B.A. in chemistry from Franklin & Marshall College, graduating with honors in 1981. He went on to earn his doctorate at Stanford University in chemistry, carrying out research on surface chemistry in the lab of Nathan Lewis, followed by a two-year postdoc at Caltech in the lab of Harry Gray on long-distance electron transfer in metalloproteins. Studying the effects of dimensionality and anisotropy on the properties of quasi-2D planar structures and quasi-1D structures in his early career at Columbia and Harvard led him to become interested in the question of how one could make a one-dimensional wire, and to the epiphany that if a technology were to emerge from nascent work on nanoscale materials "it would require interconnections – exceedingly small, wire-like structures to move information around, move electrons around, and connect devices together". Lieber was an early proponent of using the fundamental physical advantages of the very small to meld the worlds of optics and electronics and create interfaces between nanoscale materials and biological structures, and "to develop entirely new technologies, technologies we cannot even predict today."

Lieber joined Columbia University's department of chemistry in 1987, where he was assistant professor (1987–1990) and associate professor (1990–1991) before moving to Harvard as full professor in 1992. He holds a joint appointment at Harvard University in the department of chemistry and chemical biology and the Harvard Paulson School of Engineering and Applied Sciences, as the Joshua and Beth Friedman University Professor. He became chair of Harvard's department of chemistry and chemical biology in 2015. Lieber was placed on "indefinite" paid administrative leave in January 2020 shortly after he was accused of making false statements to federal agents.

Lieber completed his tenure at Harvard University with a retirement in 2023, then joined Tsinghua University as full professor in 2025. Since April 2025, Lieber has also taken on the role of the director of i-BRAIN (Institute for Brain Research, Advanced Interfaces and Neurotechnologies), a branch of the Shenzhen Medical Academy of Research and Translation (SMART). He oversees advanced research in brain-computer interfaces with advanced nanofabrication tools and facilities.

== Contributions ==
Lieber's contributions to the rational growth, characterization, and applications of a range of functional nanoscale materials and heterostructures have provided concepts central to the bottom-up paradigm of nanoscience. These include rational synthesis of functional nanowire building blocks, characterization of these materials, and demonstration of their application in areas ranging from electronics, computing, photonics, and energy science to biology and medicine.

Nanomaterials synthesis. In his early work Lieber articulated the motivation for pursuing designed growth of nanometer-diameter wires in which composition, size, structure and morphology could be controlled over a wide range, and outlined a general method for the first controlled synthesis of free-standing single-crystal semiconductor nanowires, providing the groundwork for predictable growth of nanowires of virtually any elements and compounds in the periodic table. He proposed and demonstrated a general concept for the growth of nanoscale axial heterostructures and the growth of nanowire superlattices with new photonic and electronic properties, the basis of intensive efforts today in nanowire photonics and electronics.

Nanostructure characterization. Lieber developed applications of scanning probe microscopies that could provide direct experimental measurement of the electrical and mechanical properties of individual carbon nanotubes and nanowires. This work showed that semiconductor nanowires with controlled electrical properties can be synthesized, providing electronically tunable functional nanoscale building blocks for device assembly. Additionally, Lieber invented chemical force microscopy to characterize the chemical properties of materials surfaces with nanometer resolution.

Nanoelectronics and nanophotonics. Lieber has used quantum-confined core/shell nanowire heterostructures to demonstrate ballistic transport, the superconducting proximity effect, and quantum transport. Other examples of functional nanoscale electronic and optoelectronic devices include nanoscale electrically driven lasers using single nanowires as active nanoscale cavities, carbon nanotube nanotweezers, nanotube-based ultrahigh-density electromechanical memory, an all-inorganic fully integrated nanoscale photovoltaic cell and functional logic devices and simple computational circuits using assembled semiconductor nanowires. These concepts led to the integration of nanowires on the Intel roadmap, and their current top-down implementation of these structures.

Nanostructure assembly and computing. Lieber has originated a number of approaches for parallel and scalable of assembly of nanowire and nanotube building blocks. The development of fluidic-directed assembly and subsequent large-scale assembly of electrically addressable parallel and crossed nanowire arrays was cited as one of the Breakthroughs of 2001 by Science. He also developed a lithography-free approach to bridging the macro-to-nano scale gap using modulation-doped semiconductor nanowires. Lieber recently introduced the assembly concept "nanocombing", to create a programmable nanowire logic tile and the first stand-alone nanocomputer.

Nanoelectronics for biology and medicine. Lieber demonstrated the first direct electrical detection of proteins, selective electrical sensing of individual viruses and multiplexed detection of cancer marker proteins and tumor enzyme activity. More recently, Lieber demonstrated a general approach to overcome the Debye screening that makes these measurements challenging in physiological conditions, overcoming the limitations of sensing with silicon nanowire field-effect devices and opening the way to their use in diagnostic healthcare applications. Lieber has also developed nanoelectronic devices for cell/tissue electrophysiology, showing that electrical activity and action potential propagation can be recorded from cultured cardiac cells with high resolution. Most recently, Lieber realized 3D nanoscale transistors in which the active transistor is separated from the connections to the outside world. His nanotechnology-enabled 3D cellular probes have shown point-like resolution in detection of single-molecules, intracellular function and even photons.

Nanoelectronics and brain science. The development of nanoelectronics-enabled cellular tools underpins Lieber's views on transforming electrical recording and modulation of neuronal activity in brain science. Examples of this work include the integration of arrays of nanowire transistors with neurons at the scale that the brain is wired biologically, mapping functional activity in acute brain slices with high spatiotemporal resolution and a 3D structure capable of interfacing with complex neural networks. He developed macroporous 3D sensor arrays and synthetic tissue scaffold to mimic the structure of natural tissue, and for the first time generated synthetic tissues that can be innervated in 3D, showing that it is possible to produce interpenetrating 3D electronic-neural networks following cell culture. Lieber's current work focuses on integrating electronics in a minimally/non-invasive manner within the central nervous system. Most recently, he has demonstrated that this macroporous electronics can be injected by syringe to position devices in a chosen region of the brain. Chronic histology and multiplexed recording studies demonstrate minimal immune response and noninvasive integration of the injectable electronics with neuronal circuitry. Reduced scarring may explain the mesh electronics' demonstrated recording stability on time scales of up to a year. This concept of electronics integration with the brain as a nanotechnological tool potentially capable of treating neurological and neurodegenerative diseases, stroke and traumatic injury has drawn attention from a number of media sources. Scientific American named injectable electronics one of 2015's top ten world changing ideas. Chemical & Engineering News called it "the most notable chemistry research advance of 2015".

== Criminal conviction ==
On January 28, 2020, during the Trump administration, Lieber was charged by the Department of Justice (DOJ) with making false statements about his involvement in the Thousand Talents Program and his affiliation with Wuhan University of Technology(WUT). The FBI found Lieber's statements regarding the matter to be false. The charges were brought amid a period of heightened scrutiny by U.S. authorities on academic collaborations with Chinese institutions.

On June 9, 2020, the DOJ alleged that Lieber, unbeknownst to Harvard, had served as a "Strategic Scientist" at WUT and participated in the founding of the Wuhan University of Technology-Harvard Joint Nano Key Laboratory. A month later Lieber was charged with four counts of violating tax laws by failing to report income he received from China.. Lieber pleaded not guilty to all charges.

Following a week-long trial, on December 21, 2021, Lieber was found guilty on six counts including making false statements and filling a false income tax return. In April 2023, he was fined and sentenced to two days in prison, followed by two years of supervised release with six months of house arrest.

=== Criticism of the indictment ===
Critics expressed worry that Lieber's arrest could amount to McCarthyism, as a part of rising tension with China amid the China–United States trade war, beginning during the first Trump administration. Dr. Ross McKinney Jr., chief scientific officer of the Association of American Medical Colleges, claimed there was increasing anxiety among his colleagues that scientists will be scrutinized over legitimate sources of international funding, purporting that "slowly but surely, we're going to have something of a McCarthyish purity testing". In March 2021, several dozen scientists, including seven Nobel Prize winners, published an open letter in support of Lieber, arguing that his prosecution by the government was "unjust" and "misguided" and "discourag[ed] US scientists from collaborating with peers in other countries".

== Awards ==
- Feynman Prize in Nanotechnology (2001)
- NBIC Research Excellence Award in Nanotechnology, University of Pennsylvania (2007)
- Wolf Prize in Chemistry (2012)
- IEEE Nanotechnology Pioneer Award (2013)
- Remsen Award (2016)
- Welch Award in Chemistry (2019)

== Other honors and positions ==
Lieber is a member of the National Academy of Sciences, the American Academy of Arts and Sciences, the National Academy of Engineering, the National Academy of Medicine, the National Academy of Inventors, and an elected Foreign Member of the Chinese Academy of Sciences (2015). He is an elected Fellow of the Materials Research Society, American Chemical Society (Inaugural Class), Institute of Physics, International Union of Pure and Applied Chemistry (IUPAC), American Association for the Advancement of Science, and World Technology Network, and Honorary Fellow of the Chinese Chemical Society. In addition he belongs to the American Physical Society, Institute of Electrical and Electronics Engineers (IEEE), International Society for Optical Engineering (SPIE), Optica, Biophysical Society and the Society for Neuroscience. Lieber is Co-editor of the journal Nano Letters, and serves on the editorial and advisory boards of a number of science and technology journals. He is also a sitting member of the international advisory board of the department of materials science and engineering at Tel Aviv University.

== Pumpkin growing ==
Since 2007 Lieber has grown giant pumpkins in his front and back yards in Lexington, Massachusetts. In 2010 he won the annual weigh-off at Frerich's Farm in Rhode Island with a 1,610-lb pumpkin, and returned in 2012 with a 1,770-lb pumpkin that won 2nd place in that year's weigh-off but set a Massachusetts record. His 1,870-lb pumpkin in 2014 was named the largest pumpkin in Massachusetts and ranked 17th largest in the world that year. In 2020, the year of his arrest, he grew a 2,276-lb pumpkin that currently holds the record for the largest ever grown in Massachusetts.

== See also ==
- Molecular electronics
- Nanoparticle
- Self-assembly
