= Sarkisov =

Sarkisov may refer to:

== People ==
- Artur Sarkisov (born 1987), Armenian football player
- Ashot Sarkisov (1924–2022), Russian nuclear physicist
- Eduard Sarkisov (born 1971), Russian football player
- Dawid Sarkisow (born 1982), Turkmen football player

== Other ==
- 12190 Sarkisov, main-belt asteroid
