= Sergey Alekseenko =

Russian scientist

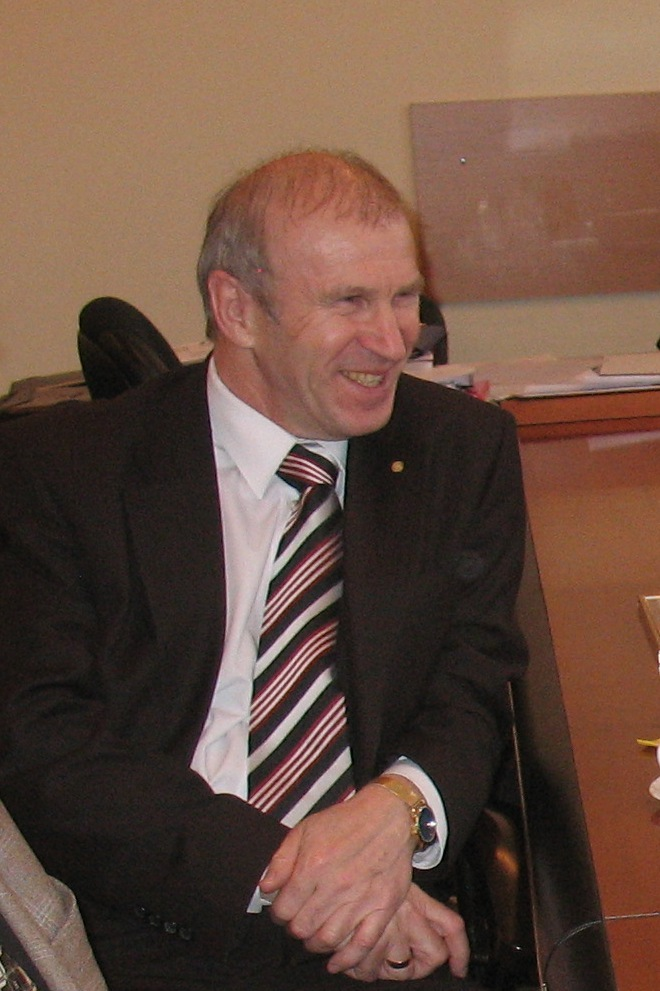
- Citizenship: Russian
- Education: Novosibirsk State University
- Awards: Global Energy Prize

Sergey Alekseenko is a Russian scientist known for his work in the fields of thermophysics and energy.

== Background ==
Alekseenko specialized in thermal physics during his studies at Novosibirsk State University, where he graduated 1972. From 1972-1981 he worked at the Kutateladze Institute of Thermophysics of the Siberian Branch of the Russian Academy of Sciences (SB RAS).

In 1981, he left the Institute of Thermophysics to work as an associate professor at the Krasnoyarsk State University. He held the position for seven years, before returning to the Institute of Thermophysics to head the Department and Laboratory of Aerodynamics of Power Engineering Equipment.

In 1997, Alekseenko became the director of the Kutateladze Institute of Thermophysics. He is renowned for his work on transport phenomena in two-phase flows, power engineering and energy saving.

In 2016, Sergey Alekseenko became a full member of the Russian Academy of Science. He is also a member of American Physical Society, Society of Chemical Industry, Scientific Council of International Centre for Heat and Mass Transfer and EUROMECH.

In 2018, he was awarded with the Global Energy Prize for his research and development in the field of thermal power engineering and heat transfer systems.
