= Samson Kutateladze =

Soviet heat physicist and hydrodynamist

- Born: Samson Semyonovich Kutateladze; 31 July [O.S. 18 July] 1914; Grand Duchy of Finland
- Died: 20 March 1986 (aged 71); Moscow, Soviet Union
- Scientific career
- Fields: Physics and energetics
- Workplaces: Polzunov Institute, Krylov Navy Academy, Novosibirsk State University, Kutateladze Institute of Thermophysics of the Siberian Division of the Russian Academy of Sciences
- Doctoral students: Vladimir Nakoryakov

Samson Semyonovich Kutateladze (Russian: Самсо́н Семёнович Кутатела́дзе; 31 July [O.S. 18 July] 1914 – 20 March 1986) was a Soviet heat physicist and hydrodynamist.

== Biography ==
=== Early life ===
Kutateladze's parents divorced when he was four, and he was raised by his mother, Aleksandra Vladimirovna, an obstetric nurse. His father, Semyon Samsonovich, had been a nobleman; he was before the October Revolution a student at Petrograd University and then an army officer. He was arrested in 1937 and died in a camp near Novosibirsk. Following the divorce, Kutateladze and his mother lived for a few years in Georgia, returning in 1922 to Petrograd.

=== Maturity ===
Hoping to supplement the family's low income, Kutateladze left school to find work on completing the eighth grade at Leningrad's Secondary School 193. His first job was as a fitter apprentice at the Chimgaz plant; shortly afterwards he entered a technical school associated with the Leningrad Regional Heat Engineering Institute, now known as the Polzunov Boiler and Turbine Institute. Kutateladze started his research without higher education and worked in the institute until 1958, rising to the position of full professor and head of a major department. His career was interrupted only by the Great Patriotic War, when Kutateladze served as a marine on the Northern Front. He was wounded in the first days of the Nazi offensive on Murmansk, and carried an irremovable German bullet in his right leg until his death.

In 1958 Kutateladze left his position at the Physical-Technical Department of the Polzunov Institute in 1958 to become Deputy Director of the Thermal Physics Institute in the newly convened Siberian Division of the Academy of Sciences of the Soviet Union. He was a major designer of the Institute of Thermal Physics and its Director from 1964 up to death. In 1994 the institute was renamed, in honor of him, as the Kutateladze Institute of Thermophysics. Kutateladze's son, Semën Samsonovich Kutateladze, is a distinguished Russian mathematician.

== Scientific heritage ==
Samson Kutateladze is renowned for his hydrodynamic theory of the burnout crisis of film boiling and for his theory of relative limit laws of wall turbulence. He propounded the latter in Siberia, together with his student Aleksandr Leontiev, who went on to become a full member of the Russian Academy of Sciences.

== Awards and honors ==
- Order of the Red Banner of Labour (1954)
- Order of the Badge of Honour (1957)
- Three Orders of Lenin (1967, 1982, 1984)
- Max Jakob Memorial Award (1969)
- Order of the October Revolution (1974)
- Polzunov Award of the Academy of Sciences of the Soviet Union (1976)
- Full Member of the Academy of Sciences of the Soviet Union (1979)
- USSR State Prize (1983)
- Hero of Socialist Labour (1984)
- Order of the Patriotic War, 1st class (1985)

== Major publications ==
- S.S. Kutateladze. Fundamentals of Heat Transfer under State Transformations of Matter, Mashgiz Publishers, 1939.
- S.S. Kutateladze and R.V. Tsukerman, Overview of the Development of the Theory of Heat in the Works of Russian Scientists in the 18th and 19th Centuries, State Energy Publishers, 1949.
- S.S. Kutateladze and R.V. Tsukerman, Overview of the Research of Russian Scientists and Engineers in the Area of Boiler Technology, State Energy Publishers, 1951.
- S.S. Kutateladze, Heat Transfer in Condensation and Boiling, United States Atomic Commission, 1952.
- S.S. Kutateladze et al., Liquid-Metal Heat Transfer Media, Consultans Bureau Inc. and Chapman & Hall, 1959.
- S.S. Kutateladze, Fundamentals of Heat Transfer, Academic Press and Arnold, 1963.
- S.S. Kutateladze and V.M. Borishanskii, A Concise Encyclopedia of Heat Transfer, Pergamon Press, 1966.
- S.S. Kutateladze and A.I. Leontiev, Turbulent Boundary Layers in Compressible Gases, Academic Press and Arnold, 1964 (translated and exquisitely commented by D.B. Spalding).
- S.S, Kutateladze, Near-Wall Turbulence, Nauka Publishers, 1973.
- S.S. Kutateladze and M.A. Styrikovich, Hydrodynamics of Gas-Liquid Systems, Energy Publishers, 1976.
- S.S. Kutateladze and V.E. Nakoryakov, Heat and Mass Transfer and Waves in Gas-Liquid Systems, Nauka Publishers, 1984.
- S.S. Kutateladze, Similarity Analysis and Physical Models, Nauka Publishers, 1986.
- S.S. Kutateladze and A.I. Leontiev, Heat Transfer, Mass Transfer, and Friction in Turbulent Boundary Layers, Hemisphere Publishing Corporation, 1989.
