= Lars Gunnar Larsson =

Swedish nuclear safety expert (born 1940)

Lars Gunnar Larsson (born 1940), often called Lars G Larsson, Licenciate of Technology and member of the Royal Swedish Academy of Engineering Sciences, is a Swedish nuclear safety expert and former manager of the nuclear reactor safety department of the EBRD.

In 2014, along with the Russian scientist Ashot Sarkisov, Larsson received the Global Energy Prize, an award presented yearly in Saint Petersburg for technological and scientific achievements within the field of energy. They were awarded the prize for their work with regard to nuclear safety and decommissioning of nuclear facilities. In particular, Larsson has worked in the Murmansk area with disposal of decommissioned nuclear submarines.

Larsson was Sweden's technical attaché to Washington, D.C., by the time of the Three Mile Island accident and is a former manager of a division of the Swedish nuclear technology agency and a former environment and energy policy manager of the Swedish National Federation of Industry. Between 1997 and 2000, he was the manager of the nuclear reactor safety department of the EBRD, and subsequently he managed the bilateral Swedish nuclear safety aid to Eastern Europe. He works as a consultant in the firm SiP Nuclear Consulting AB.
