= Gennady Mesyats =

Russian physicist

- Геннадий Месяц
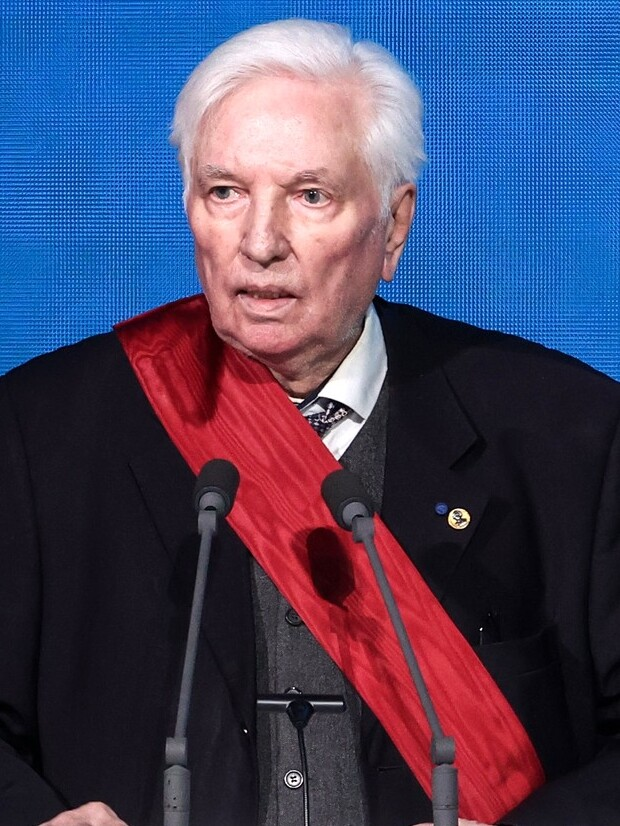
- Mesyats in 2024
- Born: Gennady Andreyevich Mesyats; 29 February 1936 (age 90); Kemerovo, West Siberian Krai, RSFSR, Soviet Union
- Citizenship: USSR; Russia
- Education: Tomsk Polytechnic University
- Known for: High-current electronics emission, Nanosecond pulse sources, Injection gas electronics, Ectons
- Scientific career
- Fields: Physics of plasma
- Workplaces: Lebedev Physical Institute
- Doctoral advisor: Lev Sena

Gennady Andreyevich Mesyats (Russian: Геннадий Андреевич Месяц, born 29 February 1936) is a Soviet and Russian physicist, founder of several scientific schools — high-current electronics and pulse electrophysics, one of the acknowledged world leaders in these areas.

He has been a vice-president of the Russian Academy of Sciences since 1987 and a director of the Lebedev Physical Institute since 2004. In 2012, he was elected as an international member of National Academy of Engineering "for development and application of pulsed power technology."

== Honours and awards ==
- Order "For Merit to the Fatherland", 1st class (2024)
- Order "For Merit to the Fatherland", 2nd class (2006)
- Order "For Merit to the Fatherland", 3rd class (1999)
- Order "For Merit to the Fatherland", 4th class (1996)
- Lenin Komsomol Prize (1968)
- Jubilee Medal "In Commemoration of the 100th Anniversary of the Birth of Vladimir Ilyich Lenin" (1970)
- Order of the Red Banner of Labour (1971)
- USSR State Prize (1978)
- Order of the Badge of Honour (1981)
- Order of Lenin (1986)
- Dyke Award (1990)
- State Prize of the Russian Federation for Science and Technology (1998)
- Demidov Prize (2002)
- Global Energy Prize (2003)
- Legion of Honour (2008)
- Order of Honour (2011)
- IEEE Marie Sklodowska-Curie Award (2012)
- Order of Alexander Nevsky (2021)
