= Ashot Sarkisov =

Russian scientist (1924–2022)

- Ашот Аракелович Сарки́сов
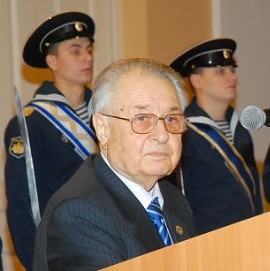
- Born: 30 January 1924; Tashkent, Turkestan ASSR, Russian SFSR, USSR
- Died: 17 October 2022 (aged 98); Moscow, Russia
- Education: Felix Dzerzhinsky Higher Naval Engineering School; Leningrad State University
- Known for: Decommissioning of nuclear facilities
- Awards: Global Energy Prize (2014)
- Scientific career
- Fields: Nuclear technology

Ashot Arakelovich Sarkisov (Russian: Ашот Аракелович Сарки́сов; 30 January 1924 – 17 October 2022) was a Russian scientist who worked with nuclear submarine technology, nuclear safety and decommissioning of nuclear facilities.

== Early years ==
Ashot Sarkisov was born to an Armenian father, Arakel Ovanesovich Sarkisov (1881–1959), and a Russian mother, Evgenia Bogdanovna (1896–1987).

== Career ==
Sarkisov entered the Felix Dzerzhinsky Higher Naval Engineering School in 1941, then served in the army during the war and resumed his studies in 1945. From 1948, he also studied at the Leningrad State University. He became Doctor of Technology in 1968. Since 1994, he has been a full member of the Russian Academy of Sciences, and he received its Aleksandrov Gold Medal in 2007. Sarkisov retired from the navy as vice admiral.

One of his research interests has been dynamic nuclear power generation processes in marine applications, particularly the effects of severe impacts. Sarkisov has also worked with the decommissioning of nuclear facilities in Northwestern Russia, for which he was awarded the Global Energy Prize in 2014, along with Lars Gunnar Larsson.

== Personal life and death ==
Sarkisov died in Moscow on the morning of 17 October 2022, at the age of 98.
