= Sergey Brilyov =

Russian journalist (born 1972)

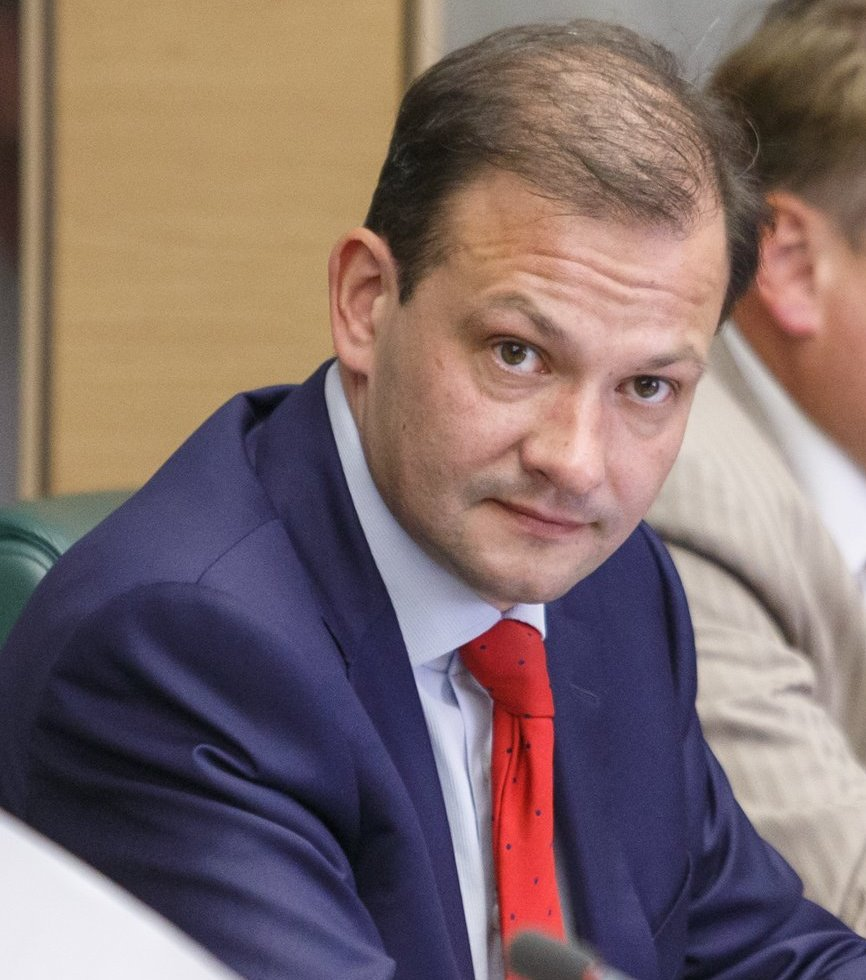
- Brilyov in 2015
- Born: 12 July 1972 (age 53); Havana, Cuba
- Citizenship: Russia, United Kingdom
- Occupations: TV anchor, public figure
- Spouse: Irina Konstantinova
- Children: 1

Sergey Borisovich Brilyov or Brilev (Russian: Сергей Борисович Брилёв; born 12 July 1972) is a Russian television journalist on the state-owned TV channel Rossiya.

== Early life ==
Sergey Brilyov was born on 24 July 1972 in Havana, Cuba, where his father worked as an interpreter for Soviet civil aircraft exporters. His early life was spent between Cuba, Ecuador, Uruguay (where his parents were posted with Soviet trade missions) and Moscow.

He attended Moscow school No. 109, known as the "Yamburg school".

He read international journalism at the Moscow State Institute of International Relations (MGIMO). Brilyov took a sabbatical in 1990–1991 to attend the Montevideo Institute of Foreign Languages (Uruguay). He briefly studied management at the University of Westminster in London.

== Career ==
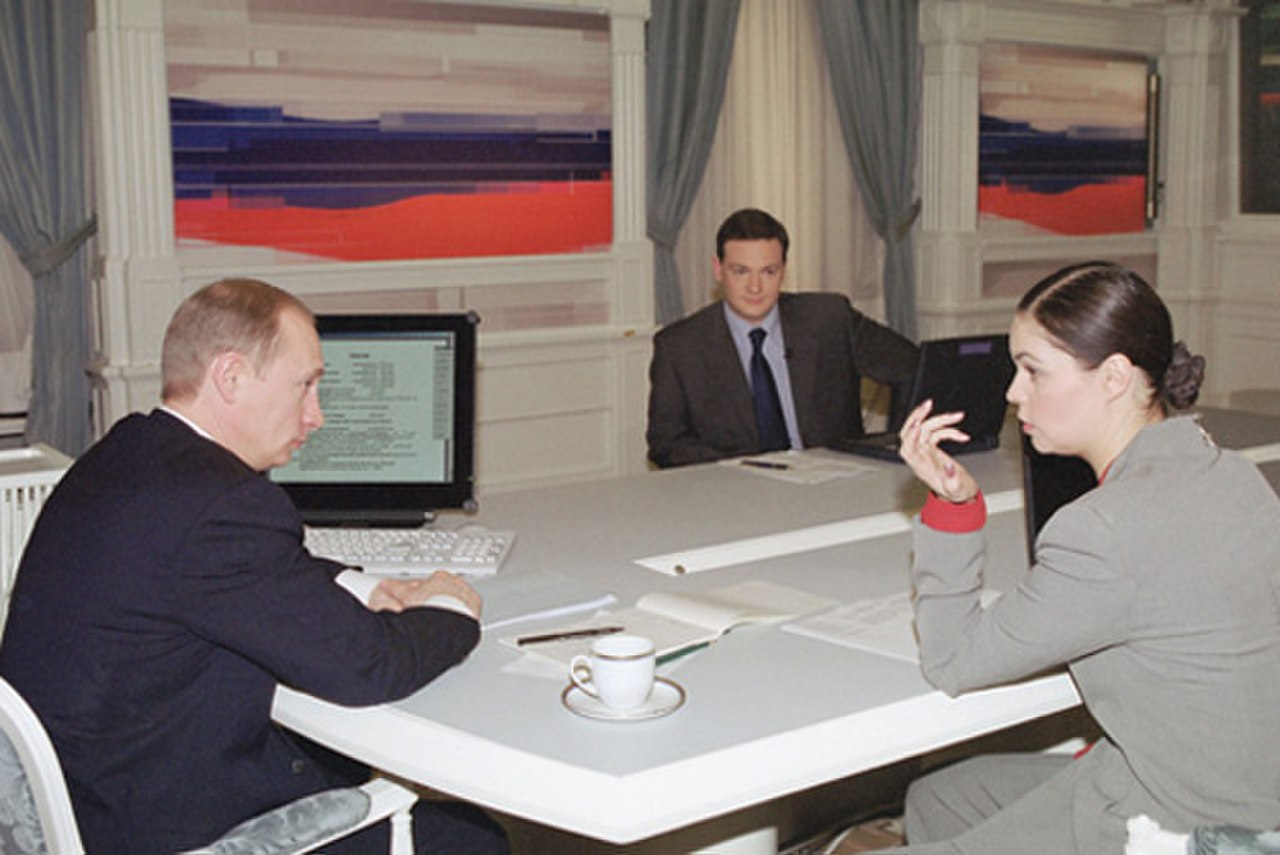
Sergey Brilyov interviews Vladimir Putin in 2001

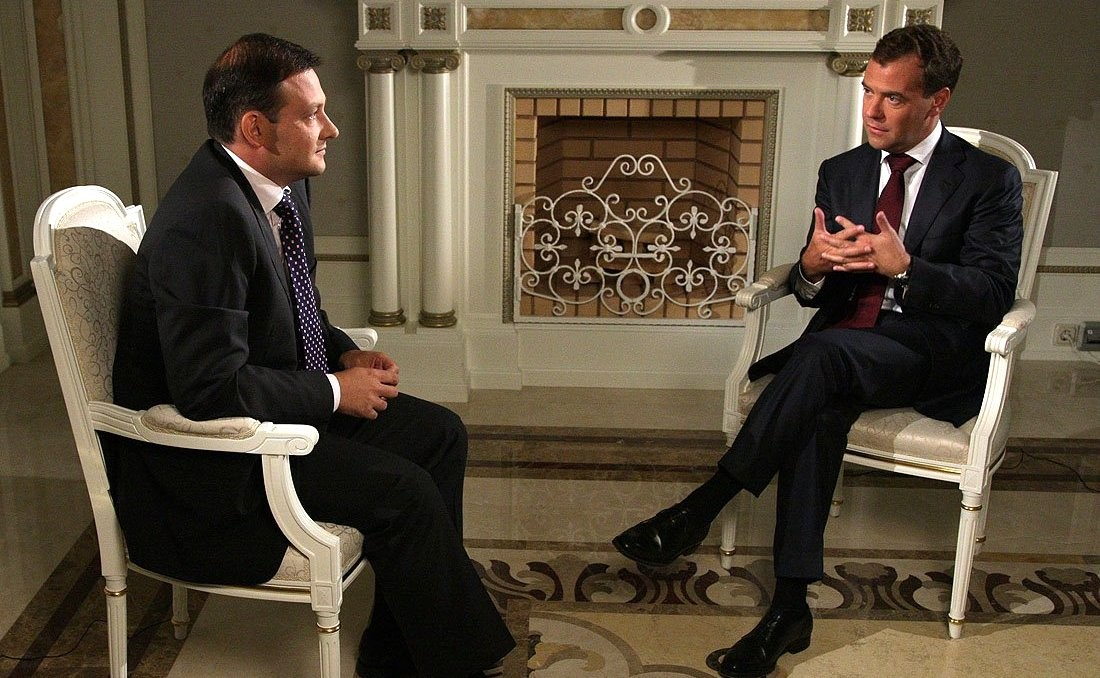
Sergey Brilyov interviews Dmitry Medvedev in 2010

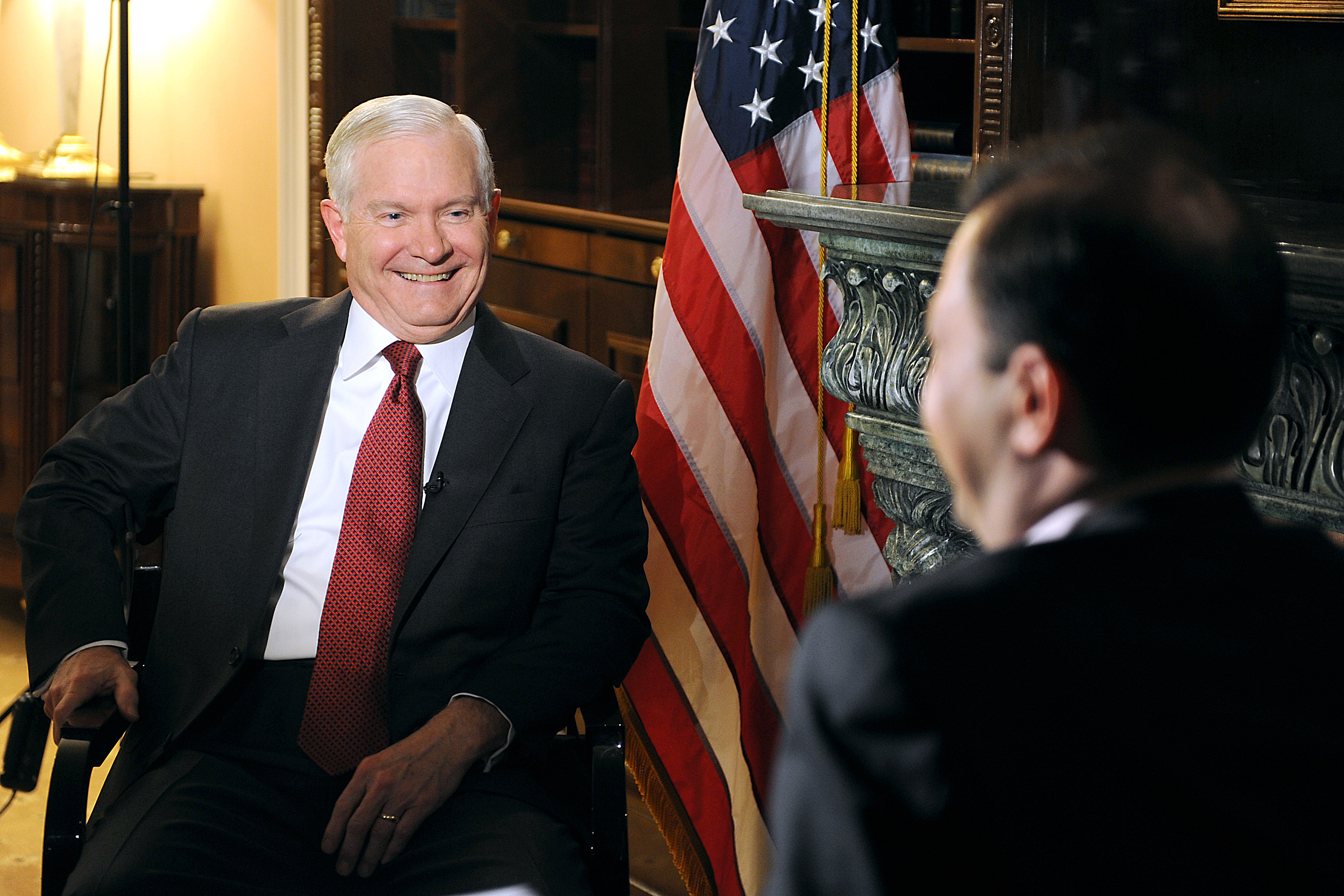
Sergey Brilyov interviews Robert Gates in 2011

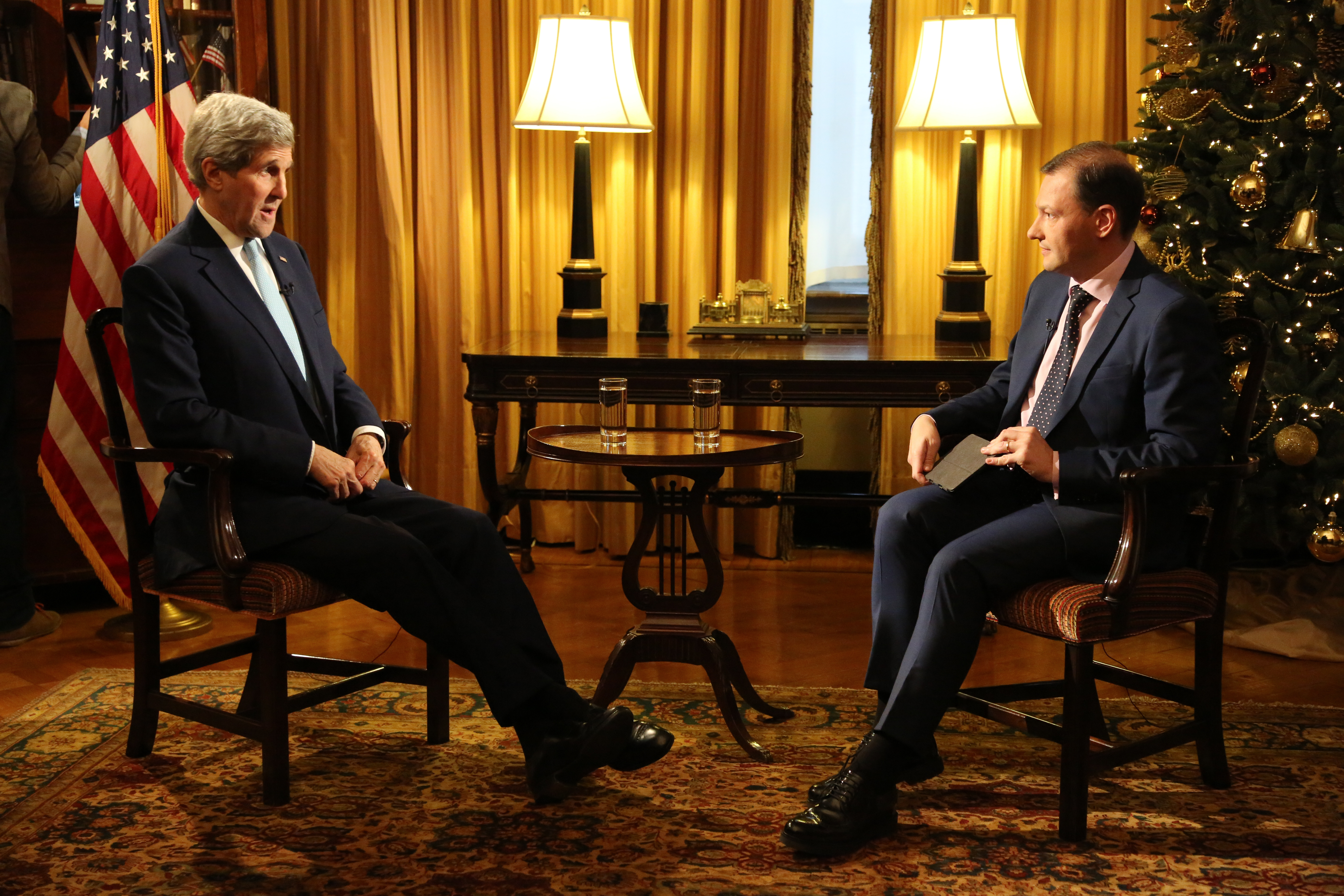
Sergey Brilyov interviews John Kerry in 2015

While studying in Uruguay (1990–1991), he was a columnist at the Uruguayan newspapers La República and El Observador Económico

During 1993–1995, he was a special correspondent of the foreign desk of The Moscow News newspaper, writing mostly about Latin America. He became the first correspondent to visit Cuba after a ban was imposed on The Moscow News in connection with refugees leaving the country on rafts and was summoned as an expert by Russia's Duma (the lower house of parliament). Simultaneously he was Moscow contributing correspondent of El Observador Económico and the Argentinian newspaper La Razón.

In 1995 and 1996, Brilyov was a special correspondent of the daily news programme Vesti broadcast by TV channel Rossiya during the First Chechen War and the hostage crisis in Budennovsk. For the five years from 1996, he was the London correspondent of Vesti.

In 2001, Brilyov accepted an offer from the head of RTR Oleg Dobrodeyev to become a presenter of the Vesti programme. His first day as presenter was September 11, 2001. Brilyov had been due to start work on 17 September, but was called in to cover the attacks on U. S. targets live on air because of his knowledge of English and international realities. He was on the air for almost the entire day, this instantly made him one of the Russia's top presenters.

From 2001 to 2003, he anchored the evening prime time daily news Vesti. 2003–2007: anchor of Sunday weekly review Vesti nedeli ("Weekly news"). Since 2008 until February 2022 he has been author and anchor of his own political programme Vesti v subbotu ("Saturday news with Sergey Brilyov").

In 2002, 2006 and 2018, he was named the best TV news and current affairs presenter by the Russian TV Academy which gave him Russia's top television award TEFI in those years.

Revealed in April 2016 in messages sent to Dmitry Kiselyov, Brilyov intended to open a branch of Russia Today in Montevideo.

One of Brilyov's specialities has been interviewing global leaders and their top functionaries. E. g. Brilyov has interviewed such Americans as George W. Bush, Barack Obama, Colin Powell, Condoleezza Rice, John Kerry, Henry Kissinger, George Shultz, Britain's Tony Blair, Gordon Brown, Boris Johnson, Robin Cook, Jack Straw and David Miliband, China's Xi Jinping, former and future French Presidents Valéry Giscard d'Éstaing, Nicolas Sarkozy and Emmanuel Macron, and Russia's Vladimir Putin, Dmitry Medvedev, Evgeny Primakov, Sergey Ivanov and Sergey Lavrov.

In 2004, 2008, 2012 and 2018 he acted as the official co-commentator of the live ceremony of the inauguration of the President of the Russian Federation, along with Channel One's Ekaterina Andreyeva, with whom he also anchored Putin's early phone-in shows (2002–2007). In 2012–2018, he also participated in the annual live broadcast Talk with Dmitry Medvedev.

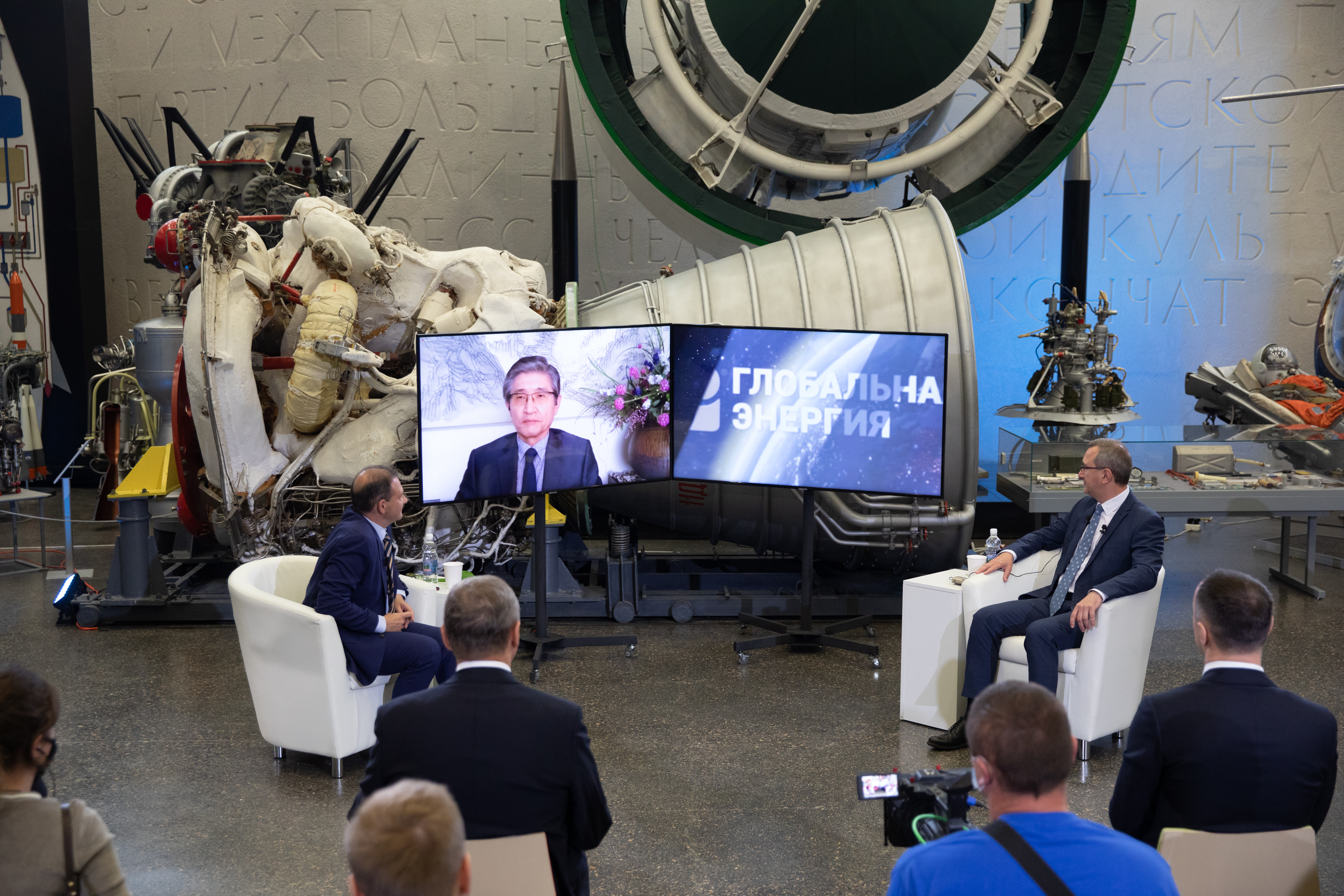
Sergey Brilyov hosts Global Energy Prize award ceremony remotely from Tsiolkovsky State Museum of the History of Cosmonautics in Kaluga, Russia in 2020

In 2013, Brilyov co-founded the Bering-Bellinghausen Institute for the Americas (IBBA), a non-governmental organisation pledged to foster dialogue between the Commonwealth of Independent States and Latin America.

He is the president of the Global Energy Association which operates Global Energy Prize.

== Views and controversy ==
Russia's anti-establishment critic Alexei Navalny accused Brilyov of being a "Putin propagandist", who "never criticises the Kremlin." In 2001, Navalny's Anti-Corruption Foundation revealed that Brilyov holds a British passport. He supported the 2020 amendments to Russian constitution, which are said to cement the existing structure of power, but explained that for him the most important part was that parliament will from now participate in the formation the federal government, which was previously composed exclusively by presidential decrees. He has publicly stated that in the past he had often voted for the Russian opposition Yabloko party, but became disillusioned by its weakness. In Latin America, Brilyov is known as an active supporter of the Sputnik-V COVID-19 vaccine.

=== Sanctions ===
He was sanctioned by the UK government in 2022 in relation to the Russo-Ukrainian War.

In February 2023 Canada sanctioned Sergey Brilyov for being involved in Russian propaganda and spreading misinformation relating to the Russian invasion of Ukraine.

== Personal life ==
Brilyov is married to Irina Brilyova (née Konstantinova). The couple met in 1989 in Moscow and married in 1998 in London; they have a daughter.

Brilyov is on the electoral roll in England. His wife owns a flat in Chiswick, west London, bought for £700,000 in March 2016.
