= Nano/Bio Interface Center =

The Nano/Bio Interface Center is a Nanoscale Science and Engineering Center at the University of Pennsylvania. It specializes in bionanotechnology, combining aspects of life sciences and engineering, with a particular focus on biomolecular optoelectronics and molecular motions, including developing new scanning probe microscopy techniques. It offers a master's degree in nanotechnology. The center was established in 2004 with a US$11.6 million grant from the National Science Foundation, and received an additional $11.9 million grant in 2009. By 2013, it had constructed a new facility, the Krishna P. Singh Center for Nanotechnology.

== Award for Research Excellence in Nanotechnology ==
The Award for Research Excellence in Nanotechnology is given by the Nano/Bio Interface Center each year to an outstanding researcher in nanotechnology. The award is given each year at the center's NanoDay outreach event.

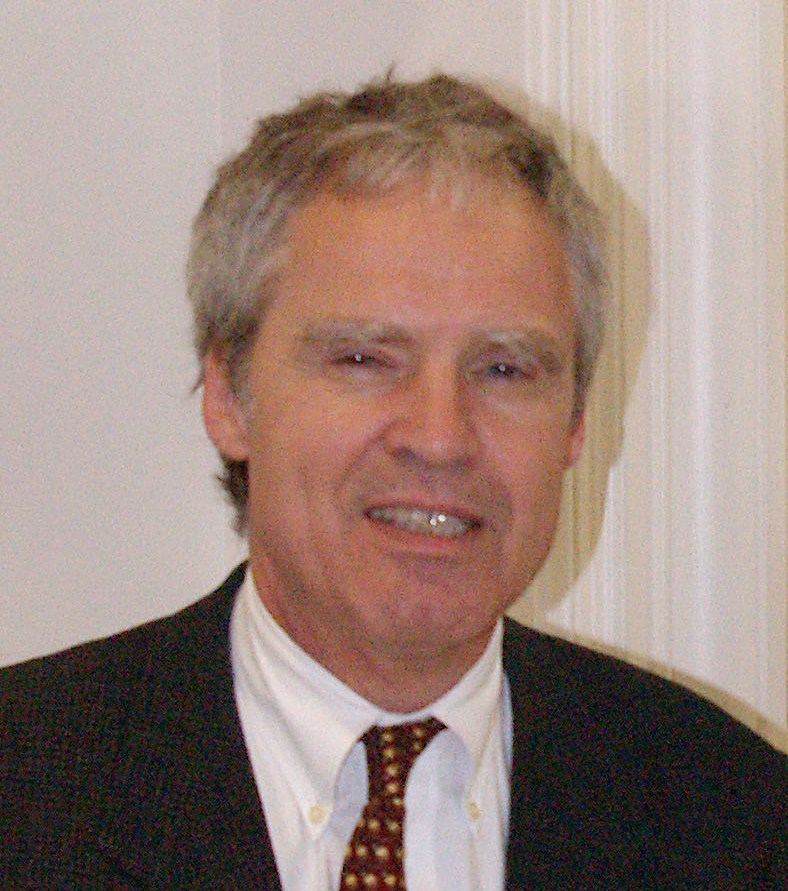
2005 awardee Horst Störmer

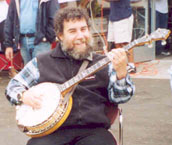
2006 awardee Steven M. Block

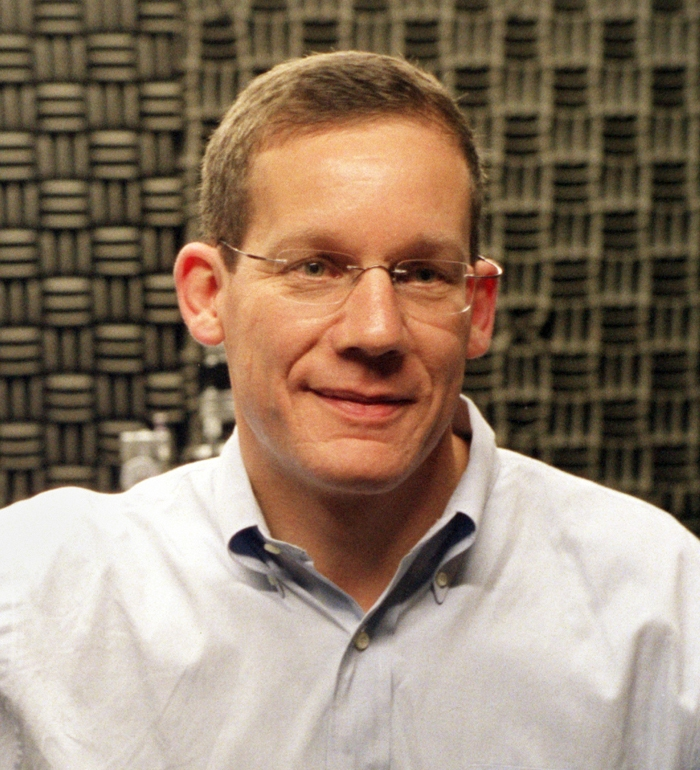
2007 awardee Charles M. Lieber

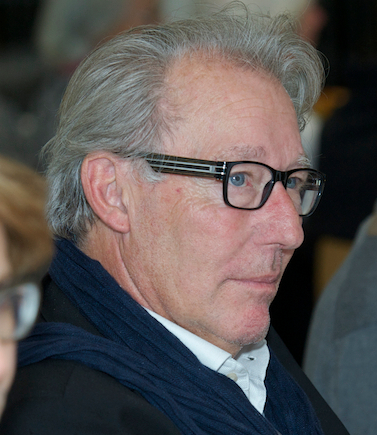
2007 awardee Christoph Gerber

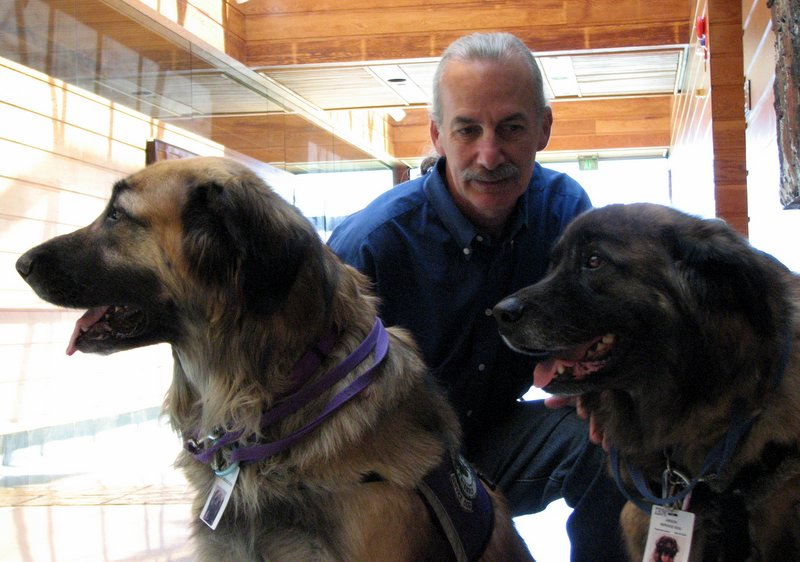
2011 awardee Don Eigler

Year	Recipient	Institution	Rationale
2005	Horst Störmer	Columbia University	2D electron sheets in semiconductors
2006	Steven M. Block	Stanford University	Optical tweezer studies of biomolecules
2007	Charles M. Lieber	Harvard University	Synthesis, characterization, and assembly of nanomaterials
2007	Christoph Gerber	University of Basel	Scanning probe microscopy
2008	Naomi J. Halas	Rice University	Nanoshells with tunable optical properties
2009	Harold Craighead	Cornell University	Nanofabrication
2010	Angela Belcher	Massachusetts Institute of Technology	
2011	Don Eigler	IBM Amalden Research Center	Low temperature scanning tunneling microscopes
2012	Toshio Ando	Kanazawa University	High-speed atomic force microscopy of protein molecules
2013	Joseph W. Lyding	University of Illinois at Urbana-Champaign	Scanning tunneling microscopy of charge density waves and silicon surfaces
2014	Charles Marcus	University of Copenhagen	Electromagnetic control of nanomaterials, fractional quantum Hall effect, and Majorana fermions
2015	Xiaowei Zhuang	Harvard University	Super-resolution imaging for the studies of biological systems
2016	Catherine J. Murphy	University of Illinois at Urbana-Champaign	Gold nanocrystals with tunable optical properties
