= Global Energy Prize =

Energy industry-centered award

The Global Energy Prize
- Awarded for: outstanding scientific research and scientific-technical developments in the field of energy which promote greater efficiency and environmental security for energy sources on Earth in the interests of all mankind
- Country: Russian Federation
- Presented by: The Association for the development of international research and projects in the energy sector "Global Energy"
- Rewards: statuette, diploma, monetary prize of 39 million russian rubles ($530,000)
- First award: 2003; 23 years ago
- Number of laureates: 56 (as of 2025)
- Website: globalenergyprize.org/en/ (in English) globalenergyprize.org/ru/ (in Russian)

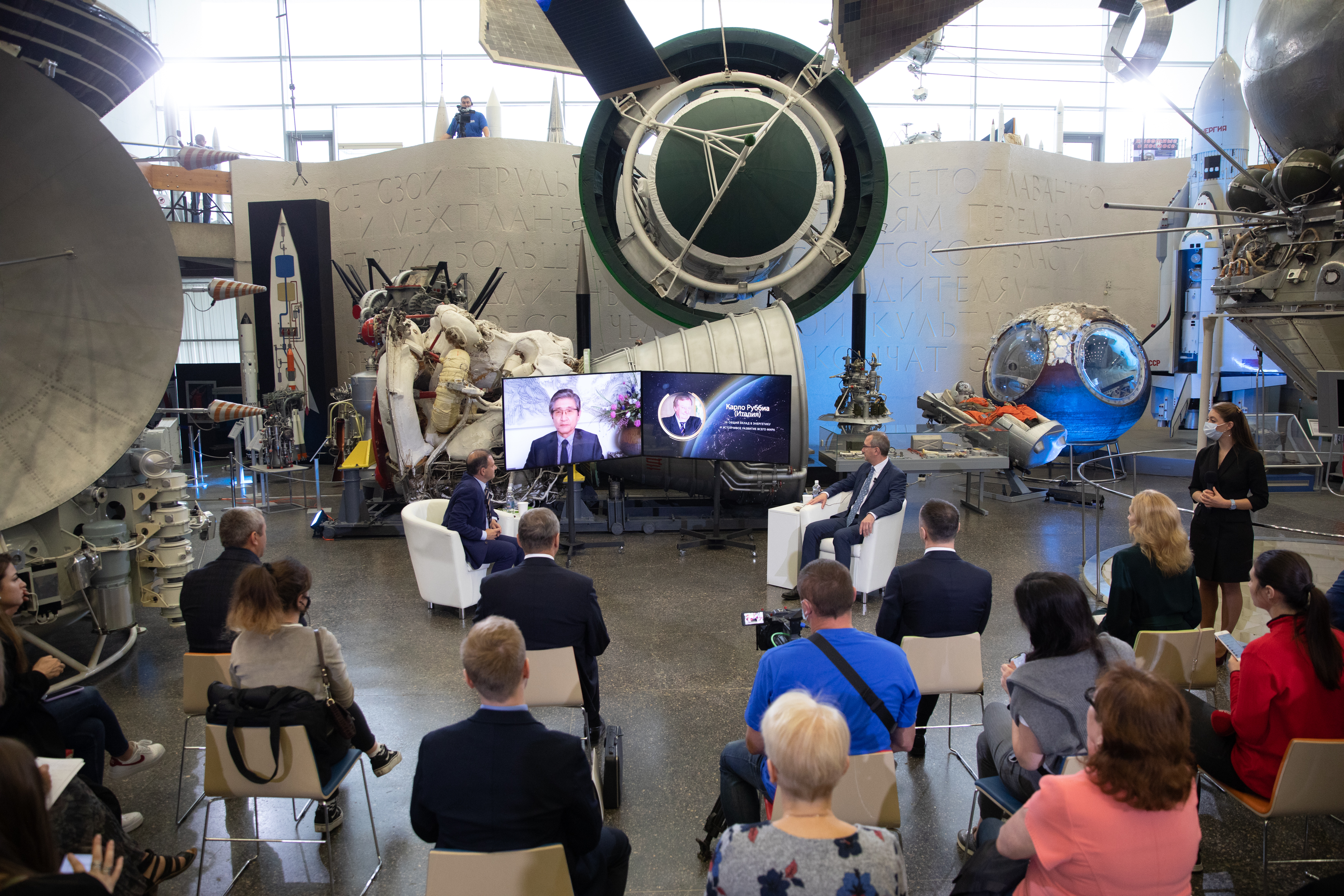
Announcement of 2020 award winners in the Tsiolkovsky State Museum of the History of Cosmonautics in Kaluga, Russia

The Global Energy Prize is an international award in the field of energy industry which is given for "outstanding scientific research and scientific-technical developments in the field of energy which promote greater efficiency and environmental security for energy sources on Earth in the interests of all mankind".

It was founded in 2002 at the initiative of a Nobel Prize in Physics laureate Zhores Alferov. The headquarters are in Moscow, Russia. The prize is awarded by the President of Russia or "a person authorized by the president". The media and the professional community consider it "a biggest Russian award" and "one of the biggest in the world". Some depictions in the press described it as "a Russian analogue to the Nobel prize". This is confirmed by the IREG Observatory on Academic Ranking and Excellence which includes the Prize in its "top-99" list of the most recognized global awards. It is the only award from Russia included in this list.

The award is managed by The Global Energy Association, which is dedicated to the development of international research and projects in energy industry. Besides award, the Association oversees conferences and informational programmes in this field, programmes for younger scientists and produces an annual report "Ten breakthrough ideas in energy for the next 10 years".

== History ==
The author of the concept was Zhores Alferov, Russian Nobel-winning physicist (2000), academician of the Russian Academy of Sciences. The prize was created in 2002 and Alferov was appointed the head of the International Committee for its awarding. The founders of the prize were PJSC Gazprom, PJCS Federal Grid Company of the Unified Energy Systems (FGC UES, Former JSC Unified Energy Systems of Russia) and Yukos. The creation of the prize was announced by Vladimir Putin at the 2002 Russia—European Union Summit.

The first Global Energy Prize award ceremony took place in June 2003 at the Konstantinovsky Palace, Strelna (St Petersburg) and was attended by President Putin. The award was presented to three scientists: Nick Holonyak (USA), a professor at the University of Illinois, "for his invention of the first semiconductor LEDs (light-emitting diodes) in the visible region of the light spectrum, and his role as founder of the new field of silicon electronics and micro-electronics for power applications"; Ian Douglas Smith (USA), chief manager and senior researcher in Titan Pulse Sciences Division company, "for fundamental research into the physics of high-power pulse-energy engineering, and the development of pulsed power in electron accelerator applications", and a Russian scientist Gennady Mesyats for the same.

For the prize's management, the Global Energy Prize Foundation was established. It was functional until 2010 and, besides the prize, launched a number of energy-related programs. In 2010 it was converted into a voluntary association, and in October 2016 it was renamed into The Association for the development of international research and projects in the energy sector "Global Energy". As of 2021, the Association's members were Gazprom, "Rosseti FGC UES" and Surgutneftegaz.

== Activities ==
In 2020, the association broadened its geographical presence, so a new record was set in the 2021 nomination cycle. For the first time, 36 countries were represented on the long list – three times the number in 2019 (12 countries) and nearly twice the number in 2020 (20 countries).

The 2021 list features scientists not only from North America, Western Europe and Asia, but also from Eastern Europe – Hungary and Latvia – from the Middle East and from Africa – Algeria, Burkina Faso, Cameroon, Ghana, Gambia, Egypt, Jordan, Madagascar, Nigeria, Togo and Zimbabwe – and from Latin America – Mexico and Uruguay. And for the first time, women were among the candidates – from India, Kazakhstan, the United States and Zimbabwe. In 2020, new members joined the board of trustees – the former president of Uruguay, Julio Maria Sanguinetti Coirolo, and the General Director, Association of Power Utilities of Africa (APUA), Abel Didier Tella. The new President of the Global Energy Association became Sergey Brilev, a prominent Russian TV journalist and manager. The former presidents were Igor Lobovsky (2003–2018) and Alexander Ignatov (2018–2020).

As of 2021, the monetary part of the award amounted to 39 million of Russian rubles (530,000 USD). The association, besides award, oversees energy-related conferences and informational projects, programmes for younger scientists with participation of honoured experts. It also produces an annual report "Ten breakthrough ideas in energy for the next 10 years". Since 2020, the ceremony has been held in different cities of Russia: the first location to be selected was the Tsiolkovsky State Museum of the History of Cosmonautics in Kaluga.

Up to now, the last public event of announcing the laureates took place in July 2025 in Krasnoyarsk; the awarding ceremony proceeded in October.

In 2020, along with the existing Global Energy Prize, a new type of award was established: Honorary Diploma of the Association, for Russian scientists contributing to the energy industry of the Russian Federation. The first laureate was mathematician Viktor Maslov – for "fundamental input into the safety of nuclear energy". In 2021 the Association presented its diploma to physicist Igor Grekhov, in 2022 – to hydro-power engineer Yuri Vasil'ev.

Since 2022, the Honorary Diplomas are also awarded to the specialists from the developing countries (7 holders as of mid-2024).

=== International Award Committee ===
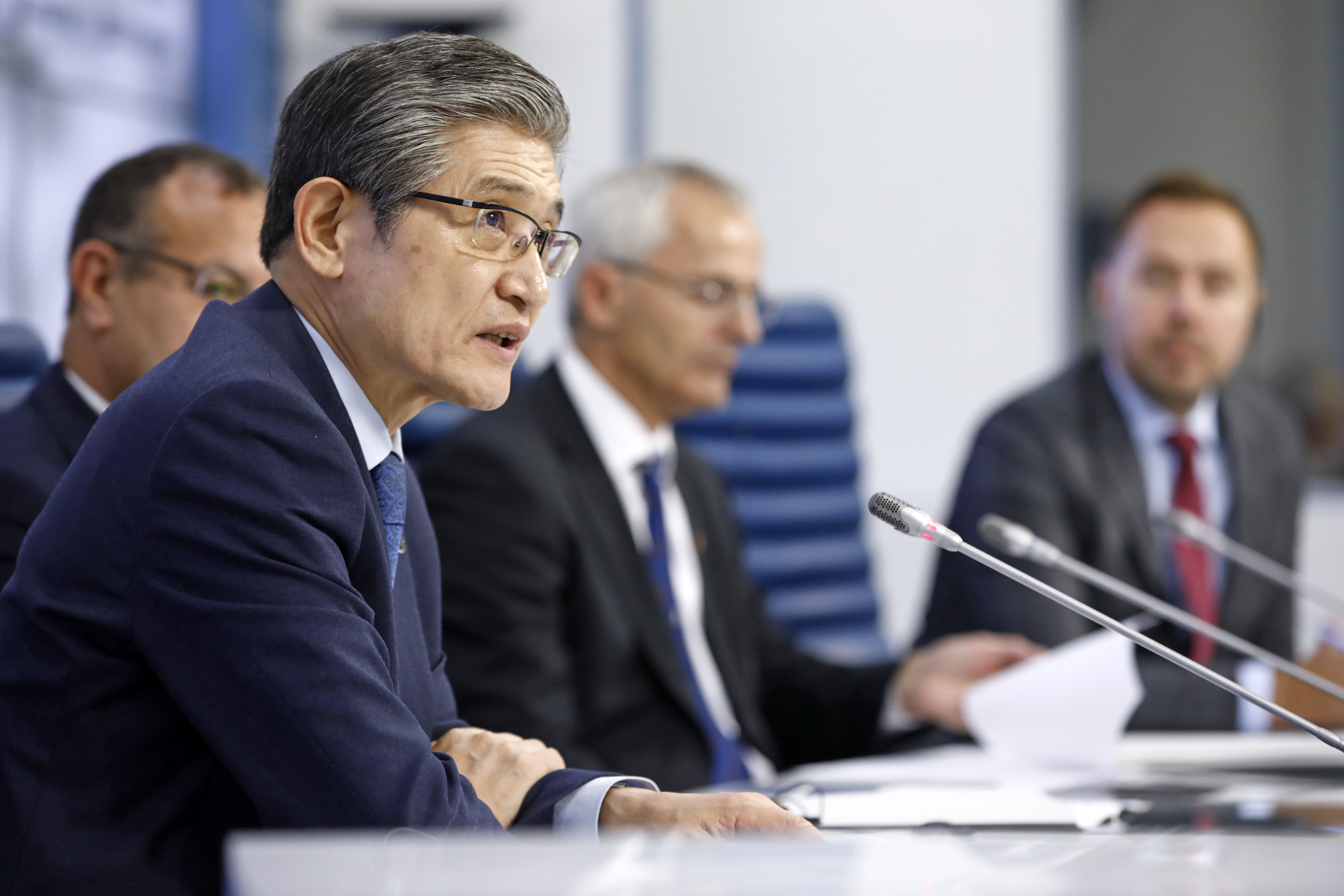
Rae Kwon Chung, Chairman of the International Award Committee in 2019

The International Award Committee is responsible for choosing the laureates of the Global Energy Prize. It includes:

- Rae Kwon Chung (Republic of Korea): Member of the Intergovernmental Panel on Climate Change (IPCC), awarded with the Nobel Peace Prize in 2007, Professor Emeritus at Institute of Convergence, Science and Technology of Incheon National University
- Adnan Amin (USA): Senior Researcher of Harvard University, Director General Emeritus of the International Renewable Energy Agency (IRENA)
- Thomas Albert Blees: (USA): President of the Science Council for Global Initiatives (SCGI)
- Marta Bonifert (Hungary): Vice President, Institute of Directors Hungary (IoD), Member of the global advisory board of Tokyo University
- Frederick Bordry (Switzerland): Director for Accelerators and Technology of European Council for Nuclear Research (CERN)
- William Il Young Byun (Singapore/Republic of Korea/USA): Managing Director at Asia Renewables, Head of Greenpower Fuels, and Principal at Conchubar Infrastructure Fund, Independent Director at the International Green Technologies and Investment Projects Center
- Nikolay Voropay (Russia): Scientific Adviser of Melentiev Energy Systems Institute Siberian Branch of the Russian Academy of Sciences, Corresponding Member of the Russian Academy of Sciences (RAS)
- Steven Griffiths (USA/UAE): Senior Vice President, Research and Development Professor of Practice, Khalifa University of Science and Technology
- Aleksey Kontorovich (Russia): Chief researcher, Laboratory of Theoretical Bases of Oil and Gas Potential of the Forecast of IPGG SB RAS, RAS Academician
- Nikolay Kudryavtsev (Russia): Independent Director, Sberbank
- Dietrich Moeller (Germany): Consultant of German-Russian Chamber of Commerce
- Yury Petrenya (Russia): Chair of the Energy and Electric Engineering, Peter the Great St. Petersburg Polytechnic University
- Nikolay Rogalev (Russia): Rector of Moscow Power Engineering Institute (MPEI)
- Xiansheng Sun (China): Director General of Energy Industry Cooperation, Vice President of China Council for International Trade Promotion, Honorary Professor, University of Dundee
- Liye Xiao (China): Director of Applied Superconductivity Laboratory, CAS, Director Of Interdisciplinary Research Center Institute of Electrical Engineering, CAS
- Nobuo Tanaka (Japan/USA): Special Advisor, the Sasakawa Peace Foundation (SPF), CEO, Tanaka Global, Inc.
- David Faiman (Israel): Professor Emeritus of Ben-Gurion University of the Negev

=== Board of trustees ===
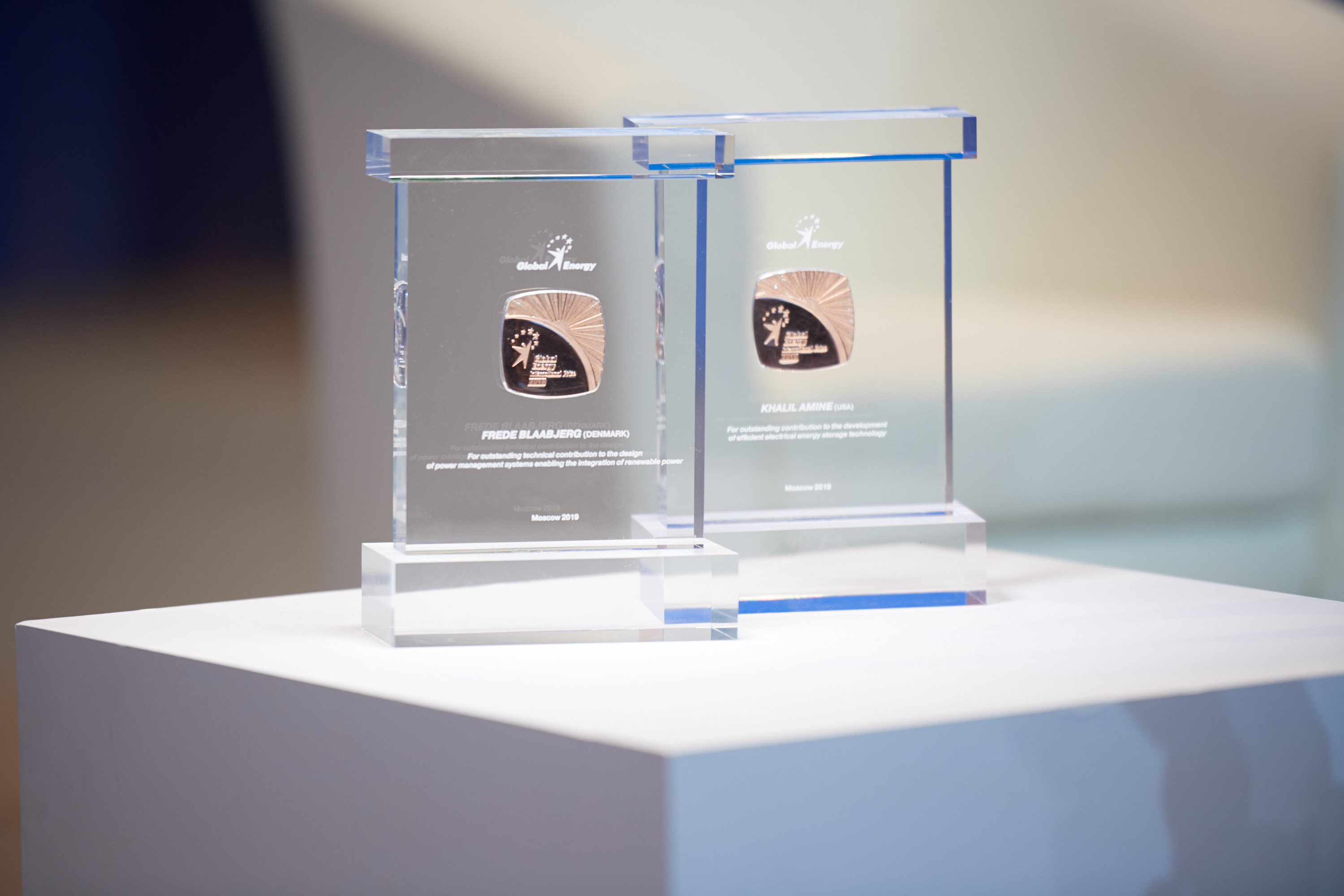
The statuettes given to laureates (2019)

The board of trustees of the association is responsible for supervision of its general management. It includes:

- Oleg Budargin: Chairman of The Board Of Trustees, Vice-chairman of The World Energy Council Vice-chairman of The Global Energy Interconnection Development And Cooperation Organisation (GEIDCO)
- Vladimir Bogdanov: CEO, Surgutneftegas
- Mikhail Gorbachev: President, International Fund for Socio-economic and political research (Gorbachev Foundation)
- Mikhail Gutseriev: Chairman of the Board, Russneft
- Arkady Dvorkovich: Co-chairman of the Skolkovo Foundation
- Alexei Likhachev: Director General, Rosatom
- Alexei Miller: Chairman of the management committee, Gazprom
- Andrei Murov: First Deputy General Director – Executive Director, Rosseti
- Alexander Novak: Russian Deputy Prime Minister
- Vyacheslav Solomin: Chief Operating Officer, En+ Group
- Abdel Didier Tella (Ivory Coast): General Director, Association of Power Utilities of Africa (APUA)
- Julio Maria Sanguinetti Coirolo (Uruguay): Honorary Doctor, University of Brazil, Lomonosov Moscow State University (Russia), National University of Asuncion (Paraguay), Universiti Malaya (Malaysia), University of Genoa (Italy), University of Bucharest (Romania), Universidad del Rosario (Colombia), Universidad de Alicante (Spain)

== Laureates ==
Since 2003, 56 scientists from 16 countries were awarded. Among them people from Australia, the UK, Germany, Greece, Denmark, Iceland, Italy, Canada, China, Russia, the US, Ukraine, France, Switzerland, Sweden and Japan. The laureates are presented an honorary medal, a statuette, a diploma and a golden honorary pin (besides monetary amount).

Nominations are accepted from scientists and/or organizations through representatives. They have to be preliminarily authorized by the Association. Among them are Nobel Prize laureates, laureates of prizes such as Kyoto Prize, Max Planck Prize, Wolf Prize, Balzan Prize, past Global Energy Prize laureates.

Country	Laureate	Notes
2003
(United States)	Nick Holonyak	Professor Emeritus, University of Illinois Urbana-Champaign
(United States)	Ian Douglas Smith	Chief Manager, Senior Researcher in Titan Pulse Sciences Division
(Russia)	Gennady Mesyats	Academician of the Russian Academy of Sciences (RAS), Member of the Board of RAS Physical Sciences Division (Moscow), Scientific Consultant, Head of Laboratory of Physical Electronics, Institute of Electrophysics of the Ural Division of the RAS
2004
(United States)	Leonard J. Koch	Professor, originator of ideas and solutions in the field of nuclear reactor safety
(Russia)	Alexander Sheindlin	Academician, Russian Academy of Sciences
(Russia)	Fyodor Mitenkov	Academician, Russian Academy of Sciences
2005
(Russia)	Zhores Alfyorov	Nobel Prize laureate, Academic, Russian Academy of Sciences
(United States)	Klaus Riedle	Honorary Professor, University of Erlangen–Nuremberg
2006
(Russia)	Yevgeny Velikhov	Academician, Russian Academy of Sciences, Research Advisor, Head of the Plasma Energetics Subdepartment, Department of Physics and Energetics of Moscow Institute of Physics and Technology, Honorary President, National Research Centre "Kurchatov Institute"
(France)	Robert Aymar	Engaged in research in the field of controlled thermonuclear fusion
(Japan)	Masaji Yoshikawa	Researched confinement of high-temperature plasma on tokamaks
2007
(Iceland)	Thorstein Ingi Sigfusson	President of Icelandic New Energy Ltd., chairman of the thermoelectric company of Genery-Varmaraf Ltd.
(United Kingdom)	Geoffrey Hewitt	Member of the Royal Society, European Academy of Sciences and Arts and other international organisations
(Russia)	Vladimir Nakoryakov	Engaged in research of hydrodynamics and heat-and-mass transfer processes in the field of energy technologies
2008
(Russia)	Eduard Volkov	Academician, Russian Academy of Sciences, Member of the academy's Energy, Engineering, Mechanics, and Control Procedures Division
(Canada)	Clement Bowman	Doctor of Science Honoris Causa, Ontario Tech University
(Russia)	Oleg Favorsky	Academician, Russian Academy of Sciences, Unit Leader, Energy, Engineering, Mechanics, and Control Procedures Division
2009
(Russia)	Aleksey Kontorovich	Academician, Russian Academy of Sciences, Chief researcher, Laboratory of Theoretical Bases of Oil and Gas Content Forecasts, Siberian branch of the Russian Academy of Sciences
(Russia)	Nikolay Laverov	Academician, Russian Academy of Sciences
(United Kingdom)	Brian Spalding	Researched concepts of heat-and-mass transfer processes, the basis of practical calculations in fluid mechanics
2010
(Russia)	Alexander Leontiev	Academician, Russian Academy of Sciences
(Ukraine)	Boris Paton	Former President of the National Academy of Sciences of Ukraine
2011
(Russia)	Philipp Rutberg	Academician, Russian Academy of Sciences
(United States)	Arthur H. Rosenfeld	Professor, member of the U.S. National Engineering Academy
2012
(Russia)	Boris Katorgin	Academician, Russian Academy of Sciences, Head of Moscow Aviation Institute's Department of Energy and Physics Systems
(Russia)	Valery Kostiuk	Academician, Russian Academy of Sciences
(United Kingdom)	Rodney John Allam	Former partner 8 Rivers capital, Member of the Intergovernmental Panel on Climate Change awarded the 2007 Nobel Peace Prize
2013
(Russia)	Vladimir Fortov	Academician, Russian Academy of Sciences
(Japan)	Akira Yoshino	Honorary Fellow, Asahi Kasei Corp., president, Lithium Ion Battery Technology and Evaluation Center, Nobel Prize laureate in Chemistry 2019
2014
(Russia)	Ashot Sarkisov	Adviser to the Russian Academy of Sciences, Member of the Directorate of Nuclear Safety Institute
(Sweden)	Lars Gunnar Larsson	Member of the Royal Swedish Academy of Engineering Sciences
2015
(United States)	Shuji Nakamura	Professor, University of California, Santa Barbara, Nobel Prize laureate in Physics 2014
(United States)	B. Jayant Baliga	Professor, Director of the Power Semiconductor Research Center, North Carolina State University
2016
(Russia)	Valentin Parmon	Academician, Russian Academy of Sciences, chairman of the academy's Siberian branch
2017
(Switzerland)	Michael Grätzel	Head, Laboratory of Photonics and Interfaces, EPFL, Swiss Federal Institute of Technology, Lausanne
2018
(Russia)	Sergei Alekseenko	Academician, Russian Academy of Sciences, Head of Heat and Mass Transfer Laboratory of Institute of Thermophysics of the academy's Siberian branch
(Australia)	Martin Green	Professor, University of New South Wales, Director of the Australian Centre for Advanced Photovoltaics
2019
(Denmark)	Frede Blaabjerg	Professor in Power Electronics, Villum Investigator, Aalborg University, Head of Aalborg University Centre of Reliable Power Electronics
(United States)	Khalil Amine	Distinguished Fellow, Leader of the Advanced Lithium Battery Technology team, Argonne National Laboratory
2020
(Greece)	Nikolaos Hatziargyriou	Professor, National Technical University of Athens
(United States)	Peidong Yang	Director of the Kavli Energy Nanoscience Institute (ENSI), Professor of University of California, Berkeley
(Italy)	Carlo Rubbia	Professor, Gran Sasso Science Institute, life Senator in Italy, Nobel Prize laureate in Physics 1984
2021
(Russia)	Suleyman Allakhverdiev	Head of the Controlled Photobiosynthesis Laboratory at the K. A. Timiryazev Institute of Plant Physiology
(Russia)	Zinfer Ismagilov	Academician of the Russian academy of sciences
(United States)	Yi Cui	Director of the Precourt Institute for Energy at Stanford University
2022
(Russia)	Viktor Orlov	Chief Specialist of the Center for Innovative Technologies (Rosatom)
(United States)	Mercouri Kanatzidis	Professor of Chemistry at Northwestern University
(United States)	Kaushik Rajashekara	Distinguished Professor of Engineering, University of Houston
2023
(China)	Zhong Lin Wang	Founding Director of Beijing Institute of Nanoenergy and Nanosystems
(China)	Ruzhu Wang	Professor at Shanghai Jiao Tong University
2024
(China)	Minggao Ouyang	Professor at Tsinghua University
(United Kingdom)	Zi-Qiang Zhu	Professor at Sheffield University
(United States)	Héctor D. Abruña	Professor of Chemistry at Cornell University
2025
(China)	Jinliang He	head of the research institute for high-voltage technologies, professor at Tsinghua University
(United States)	Yu Huang	professor at the University of California, Los Angeles
(Russia)	Vladislav Khomich (in Russian ru:Хомич, Владислав Юрьевич)	scientific head of the Institute for Electrophysics and Electric Power RAS, St. Petersburg
