= Latha Venkataraman =

Nuclear physicist

- Education: Massachusetts Institute of Technology
- Alma mater: Harvard University
- Scientific career
- Fields: Applied physics, chemistry
- Workplaces: Institute of Science and Technology Austria
- Thesis: Electronic properties of one-dimensional conductors: A study of molybdenum selenide molecular wires (1999)
- Doctoral advisor: Charles Lieber
- Website: www.venkataramangroup.org

Latha Venkataraman is a physicist. She is a professor of applied physics and chemistry at the Institute of Science and Technology Austria (ISTA).

== Biography ==
Venkataraman completed her BSc in Physics at Massachusetts Institute of Technology in 1993, followed by Masters and PhD degrees at Harvard University. Her thesis was titled Electronic properties of one-dimensional conductors: A study of molybdenum selenide molecular wires and was completed under Charles Lieber.

She worked at Vytran Corporation before moving to Columbia University in 2003, where she last held the Lawrence Gussman Professor of Applied Physics and a Professorship of Chemistry. Venkataraman also served as Vice Provost for Faculty Affairs from January 2019 through June 2022. In 2025 Latha Venkataraman moved to the Institute of Science and Technology Austria where she is currently a Full Professor for Physics and Chemistry

== Research ==
Venkataraman researches fundamental properties of single-molecule devices, combining physics, chemistry, and engineering.

== Honours and awards ==
- 2008 - National Science Foundation Career Award
- 2008 - Packard Fellowship for Science and Engineering
- 2011 - Alfred P. Sloan Fellowship in Chemistry
- 2015 - Fellow of the American Physical Society for "pioneering contributions to measurement and understanding of electron transport through single organic molecules"

== Publications ==
- Venkataraman, Latha; Klare, Jennifer E.; Nuckolls, Colin; Hybertsen, Mark S.; Steigerwald, Michael L. (August 2006). "Dependence of single-molecule junction conductance on molecular conformation". Nature. 442 (7105): 904–907. arXiv:cond-mat/0607836. Bibcode:2006Natur.442..904V. doi:10.1038/nature05037. PMID 16929295. S2CID 4311302.
- Venkataraman, Latha; Klare, Jennifer E.; Tam, Iris W.; Nuckolls, Colin; Hybertsen, Mark S.; Steigerwald, Michael L. (March 1, 2006). "Single-Molecule Circuits with Well-Defined Molecular Conductance". Nano Letters. 6 (3): 458–462. arXiv:cond-mat/0603281. Bibcode:2006NanoL...6..458V. doi:10.1021/nl052373+. PMID 16522042. S2CID 22007933.
- Aradhya, Sriharsha V.; Venkataraman, Latha (June 2013). "Single-molecule junctions beyond electronic transport". Nature Nanotechnology. 8 (6): 399–410. Bibcode:2013NatNa...8..399A. doi:10.1038/nnano.2013.91. PMID 23736215.
- Quek, Su Ying; Kamenetska, Maria; Steigerwald, Michael L.; Choi, Hyoung Joon; Louie, Steven G.; Hybertsen, Mark S.; Neaton, J. B.; Venkataraman, Latha (April 2009). "Mechanically controlled binary conductance switching of a single-molecule junction". Nature Nanotechnology. 4 (4): 230–234. arXiv:0901.1139. Bibcode:2009NatNa...4..230Q. doi:10.1038/nnano.2009.10. PMID 19350032. S2CID 205444492.
