= B. Jayant Baliga =

Indian electrical engineer

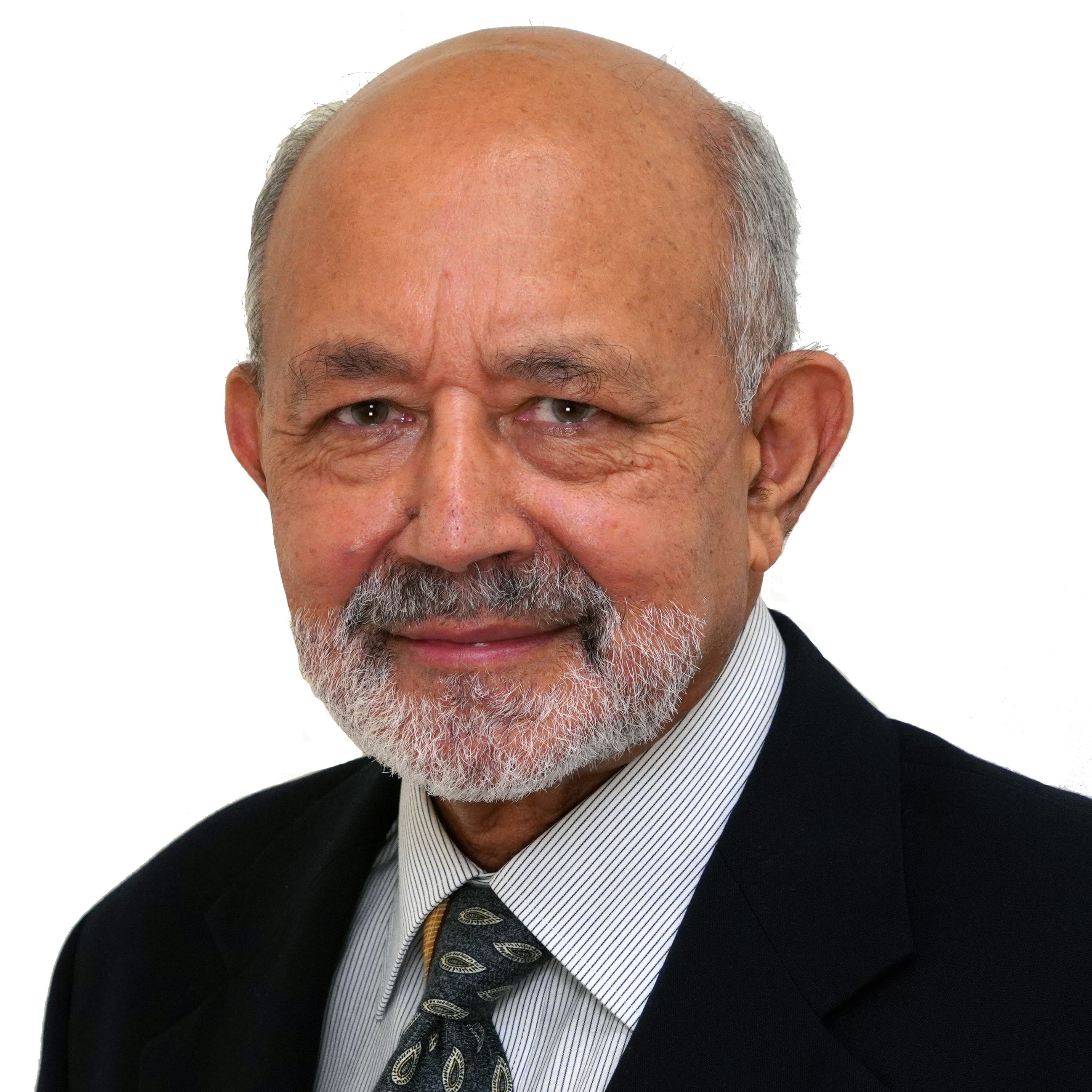
- Education: Indian Institute of Technology, Madras
- Awards: Global Energy Prize

Bantval Jayant Baliga (born 28 April 1948) is an Indian electrical engineer best known for his work in power semiconductor devices, and particularly the invention of practical implementations of the insulated gate bipolar transistor (IGBT).

In 1993, Baliga was elected as a member into the National Academy of Engineering for contributions to power semiconductor devices leading to the advent of smart power technology, and in 2024, won the Finnish Millennium Technology Prize for his invention of the IGBT.

== Early life and education ==
Baliga grew up in Jalahalli, a small village near Bangalore, India. Jayant studied at Bishop Cotton Boys' School, Bangalore. He received his B.Tech in Electrical Engineering from the Indian Institute of Technology, Madras in 1969, and his MS (1971) and PhD (1974) in Electrical Engineering from the Rensselaer Polytechnic Institute. Bantwal Vittal Manjunath Baliga, was one of India's first electrical engineers in the days before independence and founding President of the Indian branch of the Institute of Radio Engineers, which later became the IEEE in India. Baliga's father played pivotal roles in the founding of Indian television and electronics industries. During his childhood his father inspired him a lot. Baliga remembers reading IEEE proceeding during his high school days which were brought home by his father. He graduated from high school in 1963.

== Career ==
He worked 15 years at the General Electric Research and Development Center in Schenectady, New York. In the early 1980s, he invented the insulated gate bipolar transistor that combines sciences from two streams: Electronics engineering and Electrical engineering. It is a transistor switch that was immediately put into production once invented.

This has resulted in cost savings of over $15 trillion for consumers, and is forming a basis for smart grid. This device is in use in many machines and devices using electricity, from kitchen appliances, medical devices, and electric cars to the electric power grid itself.

He joined North Carolina State University in 1988 as a Full Professor. He was promoted to Distinguished University Professor in 1997. He continues to innovate in electronics, even as an emeritus professor.

He has founded three companies that made products based on semiconductor technologies.

== Recognition ==
- Baliga is a Member of the National Academy of Engineering (1993) and the European Academy of Sciences (2005), as well as an IEEE Fellow (1983).
- He received the 1991 IEEE Newell Award, 1993 IEEE Morris N. Liebmann Memorial Award, 1998 IEEE J J Ebers Award, and 1999 IEEE Lamme Medal.
- He holds 120 U.S. patents.
- In 1997, Scientific American magazine included him among the 'Eight Heroes of the Semiconductor Revolution' when commemorating the 50th anniversary of the invention of the transistor.
- In 2011, he was awarded the National Medal of Technology and Innovation, the highest award for an engineer in USA by US President Barack Obama.
- In 2014, he was awarded the IEEE Medal of Honor, "For the invention, implementation, and commercialization of power semiconductor devices with widespread benefits to society."
- In 2015, he received the Global Energy Prize for invention, development and commercialization of Insulated Gate Bipolar Transistor, which is one of the most important innovations for the control and distribution of energy.
- In 2016, Baliga was inducted into the National Inventors Hall of Fame.
- He was the Chief Guest for the 53rd Convocation at IIT Madras held on 22-07-2016. He was awarded Doctor of Science (Honoris Causa) in the ceremony.
- In September 2024, it was announced that Baliga won the million Euro Millennium Technology Prize, supported by the Republic of Finland. The award ceremony is held on October 30, 2024 in Finland. He was honored for his invention in the 1980s of the Insulated Gate Bipolar Transistor (IGBT), which has dramatically increased the efficiency of devices using electricity, allowing precise digital switching of electricity. The device is used in wind and solar technology, in electric cars, in devices for maintaining or investigating human health, in kitchen appliances and more.

== Bibliography ==
No.	Title	Publisher	Year	ISBN
1	Epitaxial Silicon Technology	Academic Press Inc	1986	9780120771202
2	Modern Power Devices	John Wiley & Sons	1987	9780471819868
3	Power Semiconductor Devices	Wadsworth Publishing Co Inc	1995	9783030067656
4	Silicon Carbide Power Devices	World Scientific Publishing Company	2006	978-981-256-605-8
5	Fundamentals of Power Semiconductor Devices	Springer	2018	978-3319939872
6	The IGBT Device: Physics, Design and Applications of the Insulated Gate Bipolar Transistor	Elsevier	2022	978-0323999120
7	Modern Silicon Carbide Power Devices	World Scientific Publishing Company	2023	978-9811284274
