= Philip Kim (physicist) =

South Korean physicist (born 1968)

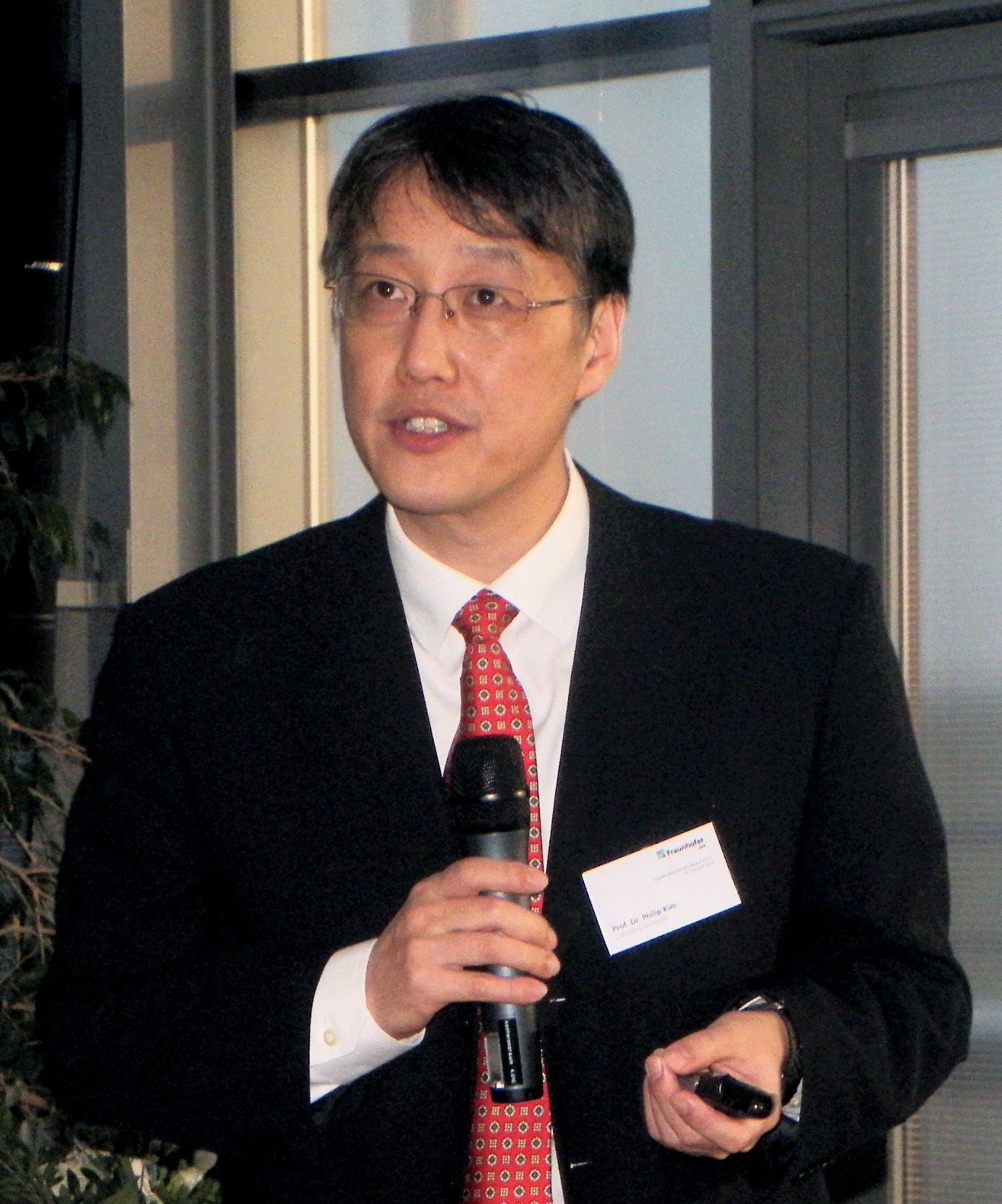
- Kim in 2012
- Born: 1968 (age 57–58); Seoul, South Korea
- Citizenship: United States
- Education: Seoul National University; Harvard University
- Known for: Quantum transport in carbon nanotubes and graphene
- Awards: Ho-Am Prize in Science (2008); Oliver E. Buckley Condensed Matter Prize (2014)
- Scientific career
- Fields: Condensed matter physics
- Workplaces: University of California, Berkeley; Columbia University; Harvard University
- Thesis: Fundamental properties and applications of low-dimensional materials (1999)
- Doctoral advisor: Charles Lieber
- Website: Official website

Philip Kim (Korean: 김필립; Hanja: 金必立; born 1968) is a South Korean and American physicist. He is a condensed matter physicist known for study of quantum transport in carbon nanotubes and graphene, including observations of quantum Hall effects in graphene.

== Academic career ==
Kim studied physics at Seoul National University and earned his bachelor's degree in 1990 and a master's degree in 1992, and a doctorate in applied physics at Harvard University in 1999 under the supervision of Charles Lieber. He worked at the University of California, Berkeley as a Miller Research Fellow until 2001, when he joined the faculty at Columbia University where much of his seminal work was carried out. He later moved to Harvard University in 2014 as a professor of Physics and Applied Physics.

== Research ==
Kim and coworkers have made important contributions in the field of nanoscale low-dimensional materials. In 1999, he and Lieber published a highly cited paper on electrostatically controlled carbon nanotube NEMS devices. In February 2005, his group at Columbia reported electrical measurements of thin graphite films produced by an atomic force microscope technique. In September 2005, they reported observation of the quantum Hall effect in single graphene layers simultaneously with the group of Andre Geim, and in 2007, the two groups jointly published observations of the quantum Hall effect in graphene at room temperature. Kim's group authored an influential paper in 2007 describing a transport gap introduced by lithographic patterning of graphene to form nanoribbons. This was an important proof of principle in the development of graphene electronics as it allowed on-off switching of the graphene devices by a factor of 1000 at low temperature. In February 2009, his group and coworkers have synthesized the large-scale graphene films by CVD method. He indicated that the quality of CVD-grown graphene is comparable to that of mechanically cleaved graphene, as observation of the half-integer quantum Hall effect in CVD-grown graphene. The group reported observation of the fractional quantum Hall effect in suspended graphene in November 2009.

== Honors and awards ==
Kim received a National Science Foundation Early Career Development Award in 2004. In 2006, he was named as one of the "Scientific American 50", a list of individuals/organizations honored for their contributions to science and society during the preceding year. Kim was awarded the 2008 Ho-Am Prize in Science "for his pioneering work on low-dimensional carbon nanostructures". He received an IBM Faculty award in 2009. In 2011, Kim won the Dresden Barkhausen Award. In his Nobel Prize lecture, Andre Geim acknowledged the contribution of Philip Kim, saying, "I owe Philip a great deal for this, and many people heard me saying – before and after the Nobel Prize – that I would be honored to share it with him."
