= Semyon Kutateladze =

Russian mathematician (1945–2025)

- Семён Кутателадзе
- Born: October 2, 1945; Leningrad, Russian SFSR, USSR
- Died: January 15, 2025 (aged 79)
- Education: Novosibirsk State University
- Scientific career
- Fields: Mathematics
- Workplaces: Sobolev Institute of Mathematics, Novosibirsk State University
- Doctoral advisor: G.Sh. Rubinstein

Semyon (Note: Also transliterated as Semën.) Samsonovich Kutateladze (Russian: Семён Самсонович Кутателадзе; October 2, 1945 – January 15, 2025) was a Russian mathematician. He was known for his contributions to functional analysis and its applications to vector lattices and optimization. In particular, he made contributions to the calculus of subdifferentials for vector-lattice valued functions, to whose study he introduced methods of Boolean-valued models and infinitesimals.

He was professor of mathematics at Novosibirsk State University, where he continued and enriched the scientific tradition of Leonid Kantorovich. His father was the Soviet heat physicist Samson Kutateladze. Kutateladze died on January 15, 2025, aged 79.

== Selected publications ==
- Bair, Jacques; Błaszczyk, Piotr; Ely, Robert; Henry, Valérie; Kanovei, Vladimir; Katz, Karin; Katz, Mikhail; Kutateladze, Semen; McGaffey, Thomas; Schaps, David; Sherry, David; Shnider, Steve (2013), "Is mathematical history written by the victors?" (PDF), Notices of the American Mathematical Society, 60 (7): 886–904, arXiv:1306.5973, doi:10.1090/noti1001.
- Gordon, E. I.; Kusraev, A. G.; Kutateladze, S. S. Infinitesimal Analysis. Updated and revised translation of the 2001 Russian original. Translated by Kutateladze. Mathematics and its Applications, 544. Kluwer Academic Publishers, Dordrecht, 2002.
- Kutateladze, S. S. Fundamentals of Functional Analysis. Translated from the second (1995) edition. Kluwer Texts in the Mathematical Sciences, 12. Kluwer Academic Publishers Group, Dordrecht, 1996.
- Kusraev, A. G.; Kutateladze, S. S. Subdifferentials: Theory and Applications. Translated from the Russian. Mathematics and its Applications, 323. Kluwer Academic Publishers Group, Dordrecht, 1995.
- Kutateladze, S. S.; Rubinov, A. M. Minkowski Duality, and Its Applications. Russian Math. Surveys, 1972, Vol. 27, No. 3, 137–191.
- Kutateladze S.S. Choquet boundaries in K-spaces. Russian Math. Surveys, 1975, Vol. 30, No. 4, 115–155.
- Kutateladze S.S. Convex operators. Russian Math. Surveys, 1979, Vol. 34, No. 1, 181–214.
- Kutateladze S.S. On Grothendieck subspaces. Siberian Math. J., 2005, Vol. 46. No. 3, 489–493.
- Kutateladze S.S. What is Boolean valued analysis? Siberian Advances in Mathematics, 2007, Vol. 17, No. 2, 91–111.
- Kutateladze S.S. The tragedy of mathematics in Russia.Siberian Electronic Mathematical Reports, 2012, Vol. 9, A85–A100.
- Kutateladze S.S. Harpedonaptae and abstract convexity. Journal of Applied and Industrial Mathematics, 2008, Vol. 2, No. 2, 215–221.
- Kutateladze S.S. The Farkas lemma revisited. Siberian Math. J., 2010, Vol. 51, No. 1, 78–87.
- Kutateladze S.S. Leibnizian, Robinsonian, and Boolean valued monads, Journal of Applied and Industrial Mathematics, 2011, Vol. 5, No. 3, 365–373.
- Kutateladze S.S. Nonstandard analysis: its creator and place. Journal of Applied and Industrial Mathematics, 2013, Vol. 7, No. 3, 287–297.

== See also ==
- John L. Bell
- Paul J. Cohen
- Forcing
- Jerome Keisler
- Model theory
- Influence of non-standard analysis
- Nikolai Luzin
- Leonid Kantorovich
- Sergei Sobolev
- Aleksandr Danilovich Aleksandrov
- Dana Scott
