= Yu Huang (nanoscientist) =

Chinese-American nanoscientist

Yu Huang is a Chinese and American nanoscientist whose research has included the development of liquid fabrication techniques for circuit-like assemblies of nanowires, and the design of catalysts for fuel cells. She is a professor in the Department of Materials Science and Engineering at the University of California, Los Angeles, where she holds the Traugott and Dorothea Frederking Endowed Chair.

== Education and career ==
Huang is originally from Fuzhou, where she was a student at Fuzhou Gezhi High School. She graduated from the University of Science and Technology of China in 1999 with a bachelor's degree in chemistry, and continued her studies at Harvard University, where she received a master's degree in 2002 and completed her Ph.D. in 2003. Her doctoral dissertation, Integrated nanoscale electronics and optoelectronics: Exploring nanoscale science and technology through semiconductor nanowires, was supervised by Charles M. Lieber. It reported on research on fabricating nanoscale circuits that was marked as part of the "breakthrough of the year" for 2001 in nanoelectronics by Science.

She became a faculty member at the University of California, Los Angeles in 2006, after postdoctoral research performed jointly through the Massachusetts Institute of Technology and the Lawrence Livermore National Laboratory. She was given the Traugott and Dorothea Frederking Endowed Chair at UCLA in 2023.

== Recognition ==
In 2008 she received a Presidential Early Career Award for Scientists and Engineers. She was the 2017 recipient of the Carol Tyler Award of the International Precious Metals Institute, and in 2023 one of two recipients of the Eni Energy Transition Award, established by Italian energy corporation Eni. She was one of three 2025 recipients of the Global Energy Prize, and was the first woman to win the prize.

Teams of UCLA researchers co-led by Huang were the recipients of the 2024 Royal Society of Chemistry Faraday Horizon Prize "for the development of electron transport microscopy to experimentally determine the platinum-surface hydronium pKa and its role in pH-dependent hydrogen evolution reactions", and the 2024 Royal Society of Chemistry Materials Chemistry Horizon Prize (the Stephanie L. Kwolek Prize) "for the development of van der Waals thin films with high electronic performance, mechanical stretchability, and permeability".

Huang was elected as a Fellow of the Materials Research Society in 2017 and as a Fellow of the Royal Society of Chemistry in 2018.
