= Yi Cui (scientist) =

Chinese physical chemist (born 1976)

- 崔屹
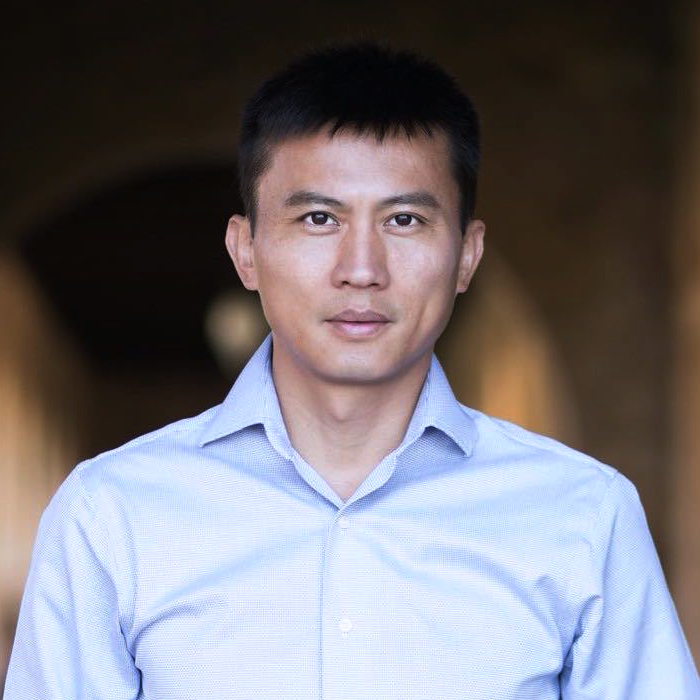
- Cui in 2020
- Born: 1976 (age 49–50); Laibin, Guangxi, China
- Education: University of Science and Technology of China (BS); Harvard University (PhD)
- Scientific career
- Fields: Physical chemistry
- Thesis: Semiconductor nanowires for nanotechnology: Synthesis, properties, nanoelectronics, nanophotonics, and nanosensors (2002)
- Doctoral advisor: Charles M. Lieber
- Other academic advisors: A. Paul Alivisatos
- Website: profiles.stanford.edu/yi-cui

Yi Cui (Chinese: 崔屹; pinyin: Cuī Yì; born 1976) is a Chinese-American physical chemist specializing in the fields of nanotechnology, materials science, sustainable energy, and chemistry. He is a professor of materials science and engineering, a professor of energy science and engineering, and the Fortinet Founders Professor at Stanford University.

According to Clarivate, Cui is a Highly Cited Researcher in the fields of materials science, environment and ecology, engineering, and chemistry, as of 2023. From 2020 to 2023, Cui was the director of the Precourt Institute for Energy, and, since 2023, he has served as the inaugural faculty director of the Sustainability Accelerator in the Doerr School of Sustainability.

Cui is an elected a member of the National Academy of Sciences. He is also a fellow of the American Association for the Advancement of Science, the Electrochemical Society, the Materials Research Society, and the Royal Society of Chemistry. He was also named one of the world's "most influential scientific minds" by Thomson Reuters in 2014 and 2015.

== Biography ==
Cui was born in Laibin, Guangxi, China, in 1976. He graduated from the University of Science and Technology of China with a Bachelor of Science in chemistry in 1998. He then pursued graduate studies with Charles M. Lieber at Harvard University, where he earned his Ph.D. in physical chemistry in 2002. At Harvard, he did research on nanoscale sensors and devices for highly sensitive detection based on the silicon nanowire technology.

After obtaining his doctorate, Cui became a postdoctoral research fellow under A. Paul Alivisatos at the University of California, Berkeley. There, he worked on electronic property and assembly of colloidal nanostructures.

In 2005, Cui joined the Department of Materials Science and Engineering at Stanford University as an assistant professor and started to pursue energy and environment-related research. He received tenure in 2010 and was promoted to the rank of full professor in 2016.

== Research and business ==
In 2004, Steven Chu became the director of Lawrence Berkeley National Laboratory, where Chu launched several major initiatives centered on clean energy. Influenced by Chu's advocate on energy and climate change during his postdoctoral study at Berkeley, Cui decided to dedicate his Stanford lab to clean energy research and related topics. In 2008, his team reported "High-performance lithium battery anodes using silicon nanowires", which triggered global interests in the use of nanotechnology and nanomaterials for energy storage. Over the years, he has largely contributed to materials design for high energy-density batteries, grid-scale storage, and the safety of batteries. His group also covers a diverse array of research topics, such as solar cells, two-dimensional materials, electrocatalysis, textile engineering, water technology, air filtration, soil cleanup, and bio-nano interface. Cui is the most cited author of several journals covering nanotechnology including Nature Communications, Nano Letters, ACS Central Science, Nature Energy, Nano Today.

In 2016, Cui employed cryogenic electron microscopy (cryo-EM) to image batteries at an atomic resolution for the first time. The high-resolution imaging unveiled the nature of lithium dendrites, providing mechanistic insights into the nanostructure of solid-electrolyte interphase (SEI). Currently, his group is implementing cryo-EM to probe atomic and molecular details in the metal-organic framework, perovskite, and other nanomaterials.

During the recent COVID-19 pandemic, Cui assembled a team with Steven Chu to investigate the reuse of respirators and face masks after different disinfection treatments. Cui and coworkers showed that the heat treatment (75˚C for 30 min or 85˚C for 20 min) decontaminated SARS-CoV-2 and other RNA viruses from the mask fabric without compromising its filtration efficiency.

Cui has established close collaboration with a number of Stanford faculty, including Steven Chu, Zhenan Bao, Robert Huggins, William Nix, Shanhui Fan, Wah Chiu, Bianxiao Cui, Harold Y. Hwang, Craig Criddle, Alexandria Boehm, Mark Brongersma, Zhi-Xun Shen, Shoucheng Zhang, Michael Toney, and Hongjie Dai, as well as Gang Chen from MIT.

He has also founded several companies to commercialize the technological breakthroughs from his research group: Amprius Inc. (traded as NYSE: AMPX), 4C Air Inc., EEnovate Technology Inc., EnerVenue Inc., and LifeLabs Design.

== Accolades ==
- The Nano Research Award, Tsinghua University Press and Springer Nature (2023)
- Gabor A. and Judith K. Somorjai Visiting Miller Professorship Award, Miller Institute UC Berkeley (2022)
- Elected Member of the National Academy of Sciences (2022)
- Global Energy Prize, The Global Energy Association (2021)
- The Ernest Orlando Lawrence Award, U.S. Department of Energy (2021)
- Top 10 breakthroughs in the Engineering and Technology category, the Falling Walls (2020)
- Fellow of American Association for the Advancement of Science (AAAS) (2020)
- MRS Medal, Materials Research Society (2020)
- Battery Division Technology Award, The Electrochemical Society (2019)
- International Automotive Lithium Battery Association's Research Award (2019)
- Dan Maydan Prize in Nanoscience (2019)
- Nano Today Award (2019)
- Fellow of The Electrochemical Society (2018)
- Blavatnik National Laureate in Physical Sciences and Engineering (2017)
- Blavatnik National Award Finalist (2016)
- Top 10 World Changing Ideas (cooling textile) by Scientific American (2016)
- MRS Fellow (2016)
- MRS Kavli Distinguished Lectureship in Nanoscience (2015)
- Fellow of Royal Society of Chemistry (2015)
- Small Young Innovator Awards (2015)
- Resonate Award for Sustainability (2015)
- Inorganic Chemistry Frontiers Award for Young Scientist (2015)
- Inaugural Schlumberger Chemistry Lectureship at University of Cambridge (2015)
- Top 10 World Changing Ideas (batteries that capture low-grade waste heat) by Scientific American (2014)
- Bau Family Awards in Inorganic Chemistry (2014)
- Inaugural Nano Energy Award Winner (2014)
- Blavatnik National Award Finalist (2014)
- IUPAC Distinguished Award for Novel Materials and Their Synthesis (2013)
- Scientist in Residence at the University of Duisburg-Essen (2013)
- Next Power Visiting Chair Professorship at National Tsing Hua University (2013)
- E. Bright Wilson Prize, Harvard University (2011)
- David Filo and Jerry Yang Faculty Scholar, Stanford University (2010-2014)
- Top 10 World Changing Ideas (water disinfection nanofilters) by Scientific American (2010)≠
- Sloan Research Fellowship, Alfred P. Sloan Foundation (2010)
- The Global Energy and Climate Energy Project Distinguished Lectureship (2009)
- Investigator Award, KAUST (2008)
- Young Investigator Award, The Office of Naval Research (2008)
- Innovators Award, Mohr Davidow Ventures (2008)
- Terman Fellowship, Stanford University (2005)
- Top 100 Young Innovator Award, Technology Review (2004)
- Miller Research Fellowship, Miller Institute (2003)
- Distinguished Graduate Student Award in Nanotechnology, Foresight Institute (2002)
- Graduate Student Gold Medal Award, Materials Research Society (2001)

== Business activities ==
In 2008, Cui founded Amprius Technologies to commercialize silicon anodes for high energy density lithium-ion batteries. Over the past decade, the original concept developed by Cui's team has evolved into the first commercially produced lithium-ion battery that employs a 100% silicon nanowire anode with breakthrough performance approaching 500 Wh/kg over hundreds of cycles. Amprius has recently partnered with Airbus to boost the development of next-generation batteries based on Silicon Nanowire Anode technology. In September 2022, Amprius completed its SPAC merger with a unit of Kensington Capital and began trading on the NYSE under the ticker symbol AMPX.

In 2015, Cui co-founded 4C Air Inc., together with Steven Chu, aiming to bring clean air through innovative nanomaterials. This establishment was motivated by the increased morbidity and mortality associated with air pollution, mostly in developing countries. In particular, particulate matter with a diameter lower than 2.5 microns (PM2.5) is the most consistent and robust predictor of mortality in studies of long-term exposure. 4C Air harnesses the technology developed at Cui's group at Stanford and is currently developing products and solutions for PM2.5.

In 2017, Cui founded EEnovate Technology to develop nanotechnology for energy-related and environmental issues, including water purification, grid-scale energy storage, and smart wearable textiles. In 2018, EEnovate Technology was renamed EEnotech, Inc. to serve as a technology foundry focusing on sustainability.

In 2020, Cui launched EnerVenue as a spinout of EEnotech to develop metal-hydrogen batteries for large-scale renewable energy storage. EnerVenue aims to bring the metal-hydrogen battery technology that powers the international space station into a clean energy revolution, even under extremely challenging climate conditions.

In 2021, Cui launched Lifelabs Design as a spinoff of EEnotech to commercialize textile technology initially developed in his lab at Stanford. Lifelabs aims to reduce personal energy usage through new textile products and solutions.

== Personal life ==
Cui is an avid soccer player and plays midfielder to orchestrate offense and defense. He currently serves on the board of Asian-American Youth Soccer Academy (AAYSA), a non-profit agency in San Francisco.
