= Hongjie Dai =

Chinese–American nanotechnologist and physicist

- Born: 2 May 1966 (age 60); Shaoyang, China
- Education: Tsinghua University, Columbia University, Harvard University
- Known for: Carbon nanotubes, NIR-II Dyes, Plasmonic Gold
- Awards: ACS Award in pure chemistry (2002)
- Scientific career
- Fields: Chemistry; Nanotechnology; Applied physics
- Workplaces: Stanford University, University of Hong Kong
- Academic advisors: Charles Lieber
- Doctoral students: Ali Javey

Hongjie Dai (Chinese: 戴宏杰; born 2 May 1966 in Shaoyang, China) is a Chinese–American nanotechnologist, applied physicist, and chemist. He is the Sapientia Eminence Professor at the University of Hong Kong and the J.G. Jackson & C.J. Wood Professor of Chemistry at Stanford University. A leading figure in the study of carbon nanotubes, Dai is ranked as one of the top chemists in the world by Science Watch. He is currently the scientific advisor and co-founder to Nirmidas Biotech, Inc., which aims to commercialize his breakthrough research on NIR-II dyes and plasmonic gold (pGOLD) to applications in healthcare and in vitro diagnostics.

Dai received a B.S. in physics from Tsinghua University in 1989, then went to the United States through the CUSPEA program organized by Prof. T. D. Lee. He finished an M.S. in applied sciences from Columbia University in 1991, and a PhD in applied physics from Harvard University in 1994 under the direction of Prof. Charles Lieber. After postdoctoral research at Harvard, he joined the Stanford faculty as an assistant professor in 1997. In 2024, Dai joined the University of Hong Kong as a joint Professor of department of chemistry and department of mechanical engineering.

Among his awards are the American Chemical Society's ACS Award in pure chemistry, 2002, the Julius Springer Prize for Applied Physics, 2004, and the American Physical Society's James C. McGroddy Prize for New Materials, 2006. He was elected to the American Academy of Arts and Sciences in 2009, and to the American Association for the Advancement of Science in 2011. He was elected a member of the National Academy of Sciences in 2016, and in 2019 he was elected a member of the National Academy of Medicine and a foreign member of the Chinese Academy of Sciences.
