= Shenzhen Medical Academy of Research and Translation =

The Shenzhen Medical Academy of Research and Translation (SMART) is a medical research institution established in 2023 and located in Shenzhen, China. The institution focuses on advancing medical research by integrating basic biomedical research, translational science, and clinical practice.

SMART brings together clinical specialists and researchers from different scientific backgrounds to investigate the mechanisms underlying human health and disease. Its research activities aim to facilitate collaboration between basic and clinical research and support the translation of scientific findings into clinical applications.
