= Kutateladze Institute of Thermophysics =

Research institute in Novosibirsk, Russia

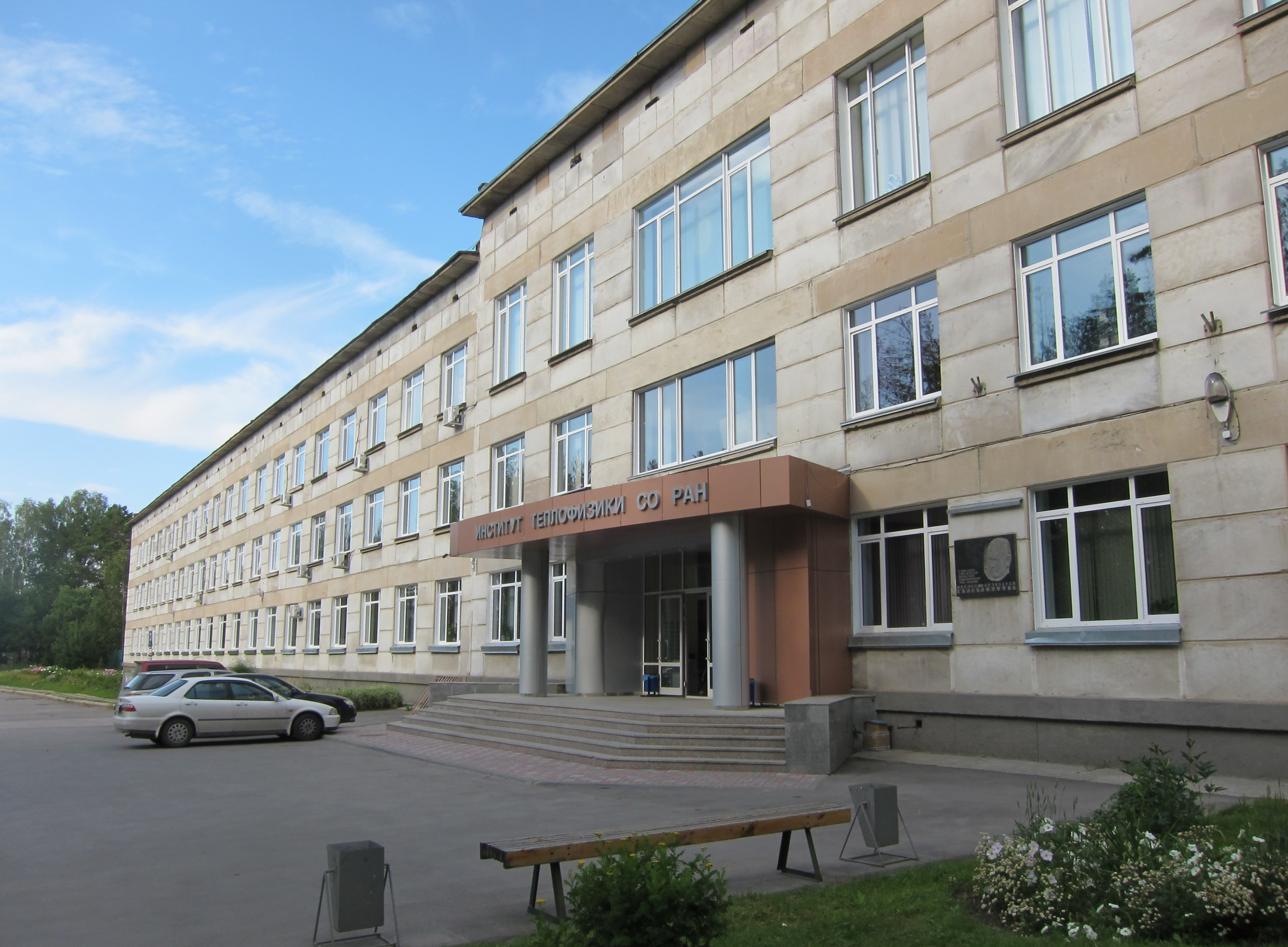
- Established: 1957
- Director: Dmitry Markovich
- Staff: 450 (2010)
- Owner: Siberian Branch of the Russian Academy of Sciences
- Address: Lavrentyev Prospekt, 1, Novosibirsk, 630090, Russia
- Location: Novosibirsk, Russia
- Coordinates: 54°51′29″N 83°06′03″E
- Interactive map of Kutateladze Institute of Thermophysics
- Website: Official website

Kutateladze Institute of Thermophysics of the Siberian Branch of the Russian Academy of Sciences (Russian: Институт теплофизики имени С. С. Кутателадзе СО РАН) is a research institute based in Novosibirsk, Russia. It was founded in 1957.

== History ==
The research institute was founded in the Novosibirsk Akademgorodok in 1957. In 1994, the institute was named after Samson Kutateladze.

== Scientific activity ==
Energy and energy-saving technologies and installations, the theory of heat and mass transfer, physical hydro-gas-dynamics, thermophysical properties of substances, thermophysical aspects of hydrogen energetics.

== Magazines ==
- "Thermophysics and Aeromechanics" («Теплофизика и аэромеханика»)

== Bibliography ==
- Ламин В. А. (2003). Энциклопедия. Новосибирск. Новосибирск: Новосибирское книжное издательство. p. 377. ISBN 5-7620-0968-8.
