= Vladimir Nakoryakov =

Soviet physicist

- Born: Vladimir Yeliferyevich Nakoryakov; July 26, 1935; Petrovsk-Zabaykalsky, RSFSR, Soviet Union
- Died: April 1, 2018 (aged 82); Novosibirsk, Russia
- Education: Tomsk Polytechnic University
- Scientific career
- Fields: Thermal physics, fluid dynamics

Vladimir Yeliferyevich Nakoryakov (Russian: Влади́мир Елифе́рьевич Накоря́ков; 26 July 1935 – 1 April 2018) was a Soviet and Russian scientist in the fields of thermal physics and fluid dynamics. An academician of Russian Academy of Sciences, he joined the Communist Party of the Soviet Union in 1972, and was awarded the USSR State Prize in 1983.

Vladimir Nakoryakov was born in 1935 in Petrovsk-Zabaykalsky (now Zabaykalsky Krai). His father was executed in 1937. Nakoryakov graduated from Tomsk Polytechnic University. In 1982–1985 he was a chancellor of Novosibirsk State University. In 1985–1990 he was a vice-president of general committee of Siberian Division of Academy of Sciences of the Soviet Union.

In 1986–1997 he was a president of Thermal physics Institution of Siberian Division of Academy of Sciences of the Soviet Union. He became PhD in 1971 with his thesis "Heat-mass exchange in acoustic field". Nakoryakov worked as a head of chairs in Novosibirsk State University and Novosibirsk State Technical University. He set down the fundamental basis for the theory of absorptive heat pump, elaborated a sequence of directions of ecologically clean power engineering and electricity-saving techniques. Also, he had been an expert in Nobel Committee for Physics and Chemistry for four years.

== Awards and honors ==
- Order of the Badge of Honour (1970)
- Order of the Red Banner of Labour (1982)
- USSR State Prize (1983)
- Order "For Merit to the Fatherland", 4th class (1999)
- Order of Friendship (2007)
- Global Energy Prize (2007)
- Order "For Merit to the Fatherland", 3rd class (2016)
