= Presidential Early Career Award for Scientists and Engineers =

Award for American scientists and engineers

The Presidential Early Career Award for Scientists and Engineers (PECASE) is the highest honor bestowed by the United States federal government on outstanding scientists and engineers in the early stages of their independent research careers. The White House, following recommendations from participating agencies, confers the awards annually. To be eligible for a Presidential Award, an individual must be a U.S. citizen, national, or permanent resident. Some of the winning scientists and engineers receive up to a five-year research grant.

== History ==
In February 1996, the National Science and Technology Council (NSTC) was commissioned by President Bill Clinton to create an award program that would honor and support the achievements of young professionals at the outset of their independent research careers in the fields of science and technology. The stated aim of the award is to help maintain the leadership position of the United States in science.

Originally, 60 recipients received the PECASE award per year. In 2008, the number of awardees was increased to 100 annually. The 2002 PECASE awards were not announced until May 2004 due to bureaucratic delays within the Bush administration. The 2013 PECASE awards were announced in February 2016 after a 2-year delay.

The Trump administration announced the 2015, 2016, and 2017 awardees in 2019 with the awards presented by the White House Office of Science and Technology Policy.

== Agencies ==
The agencies participating in the PECASE Awards program are:

- Department of Agriculture
- Department of Commerce
- Department of Defense
- Department of Energy
- Department of Education
- Department of Health and Human Services: National Institutes of Health
- Department of the Interior: United States Geological Survey
- Department of Transportation
- Department of Veterans Affairs
- Environmental Protection Agency
- National Aeronautics and Space Administration
- National Science Foundation
- Smithsonian Institution
- United States Intelligence Community

== Recipients ==
=== 1996 ===
Following the creation of PECASE in February 1996, President Bill Clinton announced 60 recipients on December 16 of that year:

==== Department of Agriculture ====
- Pina Fratamico, Agricultural Research Service
- Barbara Gartner, Oregon State University
- Kenton Rodgers, North Dakota State University

==== Department of Commerce ====
- Eric Cornell, NIST Physics Laboratory
- John Daniel, NOAA Environmental Research Laboratories
- Roland Pozo, NIST Computing and Applied Mathematics Laboratory
- David Stensrud, NOAA Environmental Research Laboratories

==== Department of Defense ====
- Andrea Bertozzi, Duke University
- Nesbitt Hagood, Massachusetts Institute of Technology
- Gail Kineke, University of South Carolina
- Paul Laibinis, Massachusetts Institute of Technology
- Venkatakrishnan Selvamanickam, Intermagnetics General Corporation
- Peter Sercel, University of Oregon

==== Department of Energy ====
- Shenda M. Baker, Los Alamos National Laboratory
- Richard A. Cairncross, Sandia National Laboratories
- Christine Hartmann, Lawrence Livermore National Laboratory
- John P. Hill, Brookhaven National Laboratory
- Philip M. Jardine, Oak Ridge National Laboratory
- Michael Smith, Oak Ridge National Laboratory

==== Department of Veterans Affairs ====
- Melissa Clark, VA Medical Center, Nashville, Tennessee and Vanderbilt University
- Joseph Cubells, VA Medical Center, West Haven, Connecticut and Yale University

==== Environmental Protection Agency ====
- David Barnes, University of Arkansas
- Keith Grasman, Wright State University
- Qing-Huo Liu, New Mexico State University

==== National Aeronautics and Space Administration ====
- Dora Angelaki, University of Mississippi Medical Center
- Christopher Chyba, Princeton University
- Andrea Donnellan, Jet Propulsion Laboratory
- Heidi Sosik, Woods Hole Oceanographic Institution
- Ellen Stofan, Jet Propulsion Laboratory
- Kimberly Weaver, Johns Hopkins University

==== National Institutes of Health ====
10 awardees:

- Allison Doupe, University of California, San Francisco
- Ali Hemmati-Brivanlou, Rockefeller University
- Paul Khavari, Stanford University
- Aron Lukacher, Emory University
- Deirdre Meldrum, University of Washington
- Lee Ann Niswander, Sloan-Kettering Cancer Institute for Cancer Research
- David Self, Yale University
- Morgan Sheng, Massachusetts General Hospital
- Mark Walter, University of Alabama at Birmingham
- Keith Woerpel, University of California, Irvine

==== National Science Foundation ====
20 awardees:

- David T. Burke, University of Michigan
- Erick M. Carreira, California Institute of Technology
- Fengshan Frank Chen, Florida International University
- Peter J. Delfyett, University of Central Florida
- Juan J. de Pablo, University of Wisconsin–Madison
- Bonnie J. Dorr, University of Maryland, College Park
- Weinan E, New York University
- Marc A. Edwards, University of Colorado
- Mark A. Gluck, Rutgers University
- Marilyn R. Gunner, City College of New York
- Daniel P. Hess, University of South Florida
- Robert T. Kennedy, University of Florida
- Michael R. Kremer, Massachusetts Institute of Technology
- Charles M. Marcus, Stanford University
- Massoud Pedram, University of Southern California
- Ruey-Jen Hwu Sadwick, University of Utah
- John W. Sutherland, Michigan Technical University
- Todd A. Verdoorn, Vanderbilt University Medical Center
- Michael E. Wysession, Washington University in St. Louis
- John Yin, Dartmouth College

=== 1997 ===
On October 23, 1997, President Bill Clinton announced 60 recipients of the PECASE for that year:

==== Department of Agriculture ====
- Eric J. Gustafson, North Central Forest Experiment Station
- Laura Lee McConnell, Environmental Chemistry Laboratory
- Sara L. F. Sunden, University of Illinois Urbana-Champaign

==== Department of Commerce ====
- Gregory T. Linteris, Building and Fire Research Laboratory, NIST
- Christopher R. Monroe, Physics Laboratory, NIST
- Erik N. Rasmussen, University of Oklahoma
- Thomas J. Silva, Electronics and Electrical Engineering Laboratory, NIST

==== Department of Defense ====
- Nicholas L. Abbott, University of California, Davis
- David S. Citrin, Washington State University
- Robert L. Clark Jr., Duke University
- Elliot Douglas, University of Florida
- Joel T. Johnson, Ohio State University
- Ying-Cheng Lai, University of Kansas
- Peter Schiffer, University of Notre Dame

==== Department of Energy ====
- Bruno S. Bauer, Los Alamos National Laboratory
- Andrew Brandt, Fermi National Accelerator Laboratory
- David J. Dean, Oak Ridge National Laboratory
- Lori A. Freitag, Argonne National Laboratory
- Thomas J. Matula, Lawrence Livermore National Laboratory
- David E. Newman, Oak Ridge National Laboratory
- John Shanklin, Brookhaven National Laboratory

==== Department of Veterans Affairs ====
- J. Michael Gaziano, VA Medical Center
- Martin R. Gluck, VA Medical Center

==== National Aeronautics and Space Administration ====
- Elfatih A. B. Eltahir, Massachusetts Institute of Technology
- Jonathan A. Foley, University of Wisconsin–Madison
- Cila Herman, Johns Hopkins University
- Mark V. Hurwitz, University of California, Berkeley
- Todd T. Schlegel, Johnson Space Center
- Eun-Suk Seo, University of Maryland, College Park

==== National Institutes of Health ====
11 awardees:

- Russ B. Altman, Stanford University
- Anirvan Ghosh, Johns Hopkins School of Medicine
- Juan Carlos Izpisua Belmonte, Salk Institute
- Macrae F. Linton, Vanderbilt University
- Peter Mombaerts, Rockefeller University
- Michael K. Rosen, Sloan-Kettering Cancer Institute for Cancer Research
- Patrick J. Stover, Cornell University
- Michele S. Swanson, University of Michigan Medical School
- Roland M. Tisch, University of North Carolina at Chapel Hill, Chapel Hill
- Sharon L. Walsh, Johns Hopkins Bayview Medical Center
- David A. Wassarman, National Institute of Child Health and Development

==== National Science Foundation ====
20 awardees:

- Jill Bargonetti, Hunter College
- Peter N. Belhumeur, Yale University
- Geoffrey E. Hill, Auburn University
- Daniel P. Lathrop, Emory University
- Jon P. Longtin, Stony Brook University
- Timothy A. McKay, University of Michigan
- Ann M. Sastry, University of Michigan
- Steven W. McLaughlin, Georgia Institute of Technology
- Renée J. Miller, Ohio State University
- David P. Morton, University of Texas at Austin
- Linda K. Nozick, Cornell University
- Kate Okikiolu, University of California, San Diego
- Lori A. Setton, Duke University
- Jaswinder P. Singh, Princeton University
- Eileen M. Spain, Occidental College
- Florence I. Thomas, Dauphin Island Sea Lab
- Lonny L. Thompson, Clemson University
- Daniel W. van der Weide, University of Delaware
- Patricia A. Van Zandt, Johns Hopkins University
- Miguel Velez-Reyes, University of Puerto Rico at Mayagüez

=== 1998 ===
On February 10, 1999, President Bill Clinton announced the 60 recipients of the PECASE for 1998:

==== Department of Agriculture ====
- John Dobrinsky, USDA Beltsville Agricultural Research Service
- Krishna Niyogi, University of California, Berkeley
- Brian J. Palik, Forest Service North Central Forest Experiment Station

==== Department of Commerce ====
- Michael H. Bergin, University of Colorado Institute for Research in Environmental Sciences, NOAA (now Georgia Tech)
- Sharon C. Glotzer, Material Sciences and Engineering Laboratory, NIST
- Anthony J. Kearsley, Information Technology Laboratory, NIST
- Joseph A. Shaw, Environmental Technology Laboratory, NOAA (now Montana State University)

==== Department of Defense ====
- Daniel J. Blumenthal, University of California, Santa Barbara
- Elizabeth C. Dickey, University of Kentucky
- Miroslav Krstic, University of California, San Diego
- John D. O'Brien, University of Southern California
- Robert G. Parker, Ohio State University
- Guillermo Sapiro, University of Minnesota

==== Department of Energy ====
- Mari Lou Balmer, Pacific Northwest National Laboratory
- Tonya L. Kuhl, University of California, Santa Barbara
- James E. Lee, Oak Ridge National Laboratory
- Roya Maboudian, University of California, Berkeley
- Anthony Mezzacappa, Oak Ridge National Laboratory
- Christopher P. Palmer, New Mexico Institute of Mining and Technology
- Gary P. Wiederrecht, Argonne National Laboratory

==== Department of Veterans Affairs ====
- Alan E. Mast, VA Medical Center
- Richard N. Pierson, VA Medical Center

==== National Aeronautics and Space Administration ====
- Mitchell S. Albert, Longwood Medical Research Center
- Howard Pearlman, University of Southern California
- Shobita Satyapal, NASA Goddard Space Flight Center
- Azadeh Tabazadeh, NASA Ames Research Center
- Paul O. Wennberg, California Institute of Technology
- Andrew Westphal, Space Science Laboratory, University of California

==== National Institutes of Health, Department of Health and Human Services ====
12 awardees:

- Angelika B. Amon, Whitehead Institute for Biomedical Research
- Marlene Behrmann, Carnegie Mellon University
- Mark E. Brezinski, Massachusetts General Hospital
- David D. Chang, University of California, Los Angeles
- Brian D. Dynlacht, Harvard University
- Ulrike A. Heberlein, San Francisco General Hospital
- Linda A. Hicke, Northwestern University
- Effie W. Petersdorf, Fred Hutchinson Cancer Research Center
- Gregory J. Quirk, Urb. Punto Oro
- Jeffrey Struewing, National Cancer Institute, NIH
- Mark Von Zastrow, University of California
- Matthew Waldor, New England Medical Center

==== National Science Foundation ====
20 awardees:

- Mario Affatigato, Coe College
- Eric I. Altman, Yale University
- Nalini Ambady, Harvard University
- Alexander Barvinok, University of Michigan
- Pei Cao, University of Wisconsin–Madison
- Janet Conrad, Columbia University
- Christopher J. Diorio, University of Washington
- Shirley J. Dyke, Washington University in St. Louis
- Rhonda F. Drayton, University of Illinois, Chicago
- Cassandra L. Fraser, University of Virginia
- Julie A. Jacko, University of Wisconsin–Madison
- Robert B. Jackson, University of Texas Austin
- Sugih Jamin, University of Michigan
- Elizabeth Lada, University of Florida
- Gregory H. Leazer, University of California, Los Angeles
- Gina M. MacDonald, James Madison University
- Scot Martin, University of North Carolina at Chapel Hill, Chapel Hill
- Hudson K. Reeve, Cornell University
- Venugopal Veeravalli, Cornell University
- Daniel Walczyk, Rensselaer Polytechnic Institute

=== 1999 ===
On April 11, 2000, President Bill Clinton announced 59 recipients of the PECASE for 1999:

==== Department of Agriculture ====
- Ann M. Donoghue, Livestock and Poultry Sciences Institute (Beltsville, Maryland)
- Emile S. Gardiner, U.S. Forest Service Southern Research Station
- Smita Mohanty, State University of New York at Stony Brook

==== Department of Commerce ====
- Pamela M. Chu, National Institute of Standards and Technology
- John G. W. Kelley, NOAA/National Ocean Service
- Nathan J. Mantua, University of Washington
- Eric L. Shirley, National Institute of Standards and Technology

==== Department of Defense ====
- Jeffrey Todd Borggaard, Virginia Polytechnic Institute and State University
- Gert Cauwenberghs, Johns Hopkins University
- Aaron W. Harper, Texas A&M University
- Daphne Koller, Stanford University
- Kathryn Moler, Stanford University
- Kimberly M. Wasserman, University of Michigan

==== Department of Energy ====
- Xian Chen, Los Alamos National Laboratory
- Ken R. Czerwinski, Los Alamos National Laboratory
- David M. Ford, Sandia National Laboratories
- Kenneth M. Kemner, Argonne National Laboratory
- John F. Mitchell, Argonne National Laboratory
- Lynne E. Parker, Oak Ridge National Laboratory

==== Department of Veterans Affairs ====
- Mary C. Nakamura, Department of Veterans Affairs Medical Center, San Francisco
- Peter A. Ubel, Department of Veterans Affairs Medical Center, Philadelphia

==== National Aeronautics and Space Administration ====
- Waleed Abdalati, Goddard Space Flight Center
- Gregory P. Asner, University of Colorado
- Michael Loewenberg, Yale University School of Medicine
- Fiona Anne Harrison, California Institute of Technology
- Preete Verghese, Smith Kettewell Eye Research Institute, San Francisco

==== National Institutes of Health ====
13 awardees:

- Linda Barlow, University of Denver
- Annelise Barron, Northwestern University
- Carolyn Bertozzi, University of California, Berkeley
- Janean Holden, University of Illinois, Chicago
- Judith James, Oklahoma Medical Research Foundation
- Celia Moens, Fred Hutchinson Cancer Research Center
- Marina Picciotto, Yale University School of Medicine
- David Russel, University of Washington
- Geraldine Seydoux, Johns Hopkins School of Medicine
- Ida Sim, University of California, San Francisco
- Ronald Summers, Clinical Center, NIH
- Weidong Wang, National Institute on Aging, NIH
- Xiaoqin Wang, Johns Hopkins School of Medicine

==== National Science Foundation ====
20 awardees:

- Linnea M. Avallone, University of Colorado Boulder
- John Chapin, Massachusetts Institute of Technology
- Donald DeVoe, University of Maryland, College Park
- Brenda L. Dingus, University of Wisconsin–Madison
- Dennis E. Discher, University of Pennsylvania
- Richard J. Elston, University of Florida
- Steven C. George, University of California, Irvine
- Lori L. Graham, University of Virginia
- Victoria L. Interrante, University of Minnesota, Twin Cities
- Predrag Jelekovic, Columbia University
- Yishi Jin, University of California, Santa Cruz
- Felicia Keesing, Siena College
- Steven D. Levitt, University of Chicago
- Todd L. Lowary, Ohio State University
- Ken Ono, Pennsylvania State University, University Park
- Feniosky Pena-Mora, Massachusetts Institute of Technology
- Sanjay Raman, Virginia Polytechnic Institute and State University
- Richard W. Roberts, California Institute of Technology
- Jeffrey S. Urbach, Georgetown University
- Zhuomin Zhang, University of Florida

=== 2000 ===
On October 24, 2000, President Bill Clinton announced 58 recipients of the PECASE for 2000:

==== Department of Agriculture ====
- Randall S. Singer, University of Illinois
- Cindy D. Davis, USDA, Agricultural Research Service

==== Department of Commerce ====
- Mark William Keller, National Institute of Standards and Technology
- Deborah Shiu-Lan Jin, National Institute of Standards and Technology
- Robert Paul Dziak, National Oceanic and Atmospheric Administration, PacificMarine Environmental Laboratory
- Shawn Marie McLaughlin, National Oceanic and Atmospheric Administration, National Ocean Service

==== Department of Defense ====
- John Gregory Morrisett, Cornell University
- Angela M. Belcher, University of Texas at Austin
- Barbara Spang Minsker, University of Illinois
- Carol A. Clayson, Purdue University
- Naoki Saito, University of California, Davis

===== AFOSR =====
- SonBinh T. Nguyen, Northwestern University

==== Department of Energy ====
- Richard B. Lehoucq, Sandia National Laboratories
- Zhihong Lin, Princeton Plasma Physics Laboratory
- Zheng-Tian Lu, Argonne National Laboratory
- Aaron L. Odom, Los Alamos National Laboratory
- Jonas C. Peters, Los Alamos National Laboratory
- Andrey Zheludev, Brookhaven National Laboratory

==== Department of Veterans Affairs ====
- Eric J. Huang, San Francisco VA Medical Center
- Margot S. Damaser, Hines VA Medical Center

==== National Aeronautics and Space Administration ====
- Michael E. Brown, California Institute of Technology
- Dana Warfield Longcope, Montana State University
- Michael J. Turmon, NASA Jet Propulsion Laboratory
- Janice M. Yelle, NASA Johnson Space Center
- Paul Houser, NASA Goddard Space Flight Center
- Yeqiao Wang, University of Rhode Island

==== National Institutes of Health ====
12 awardees:

- Philip Ashton-Rickardt, University of Chicago
- S. Barak Caine, Harvard Medical School, McLean Hospital
- Geoffrey A. Chang, Scripps Research Institute
- Christopher S. Chen, Johns Hopkins University
- Orna Cohen-Fix, NIDDK, National Institutes of Health
- Jeffrey S. Diamond, NINDS, National Institutes of Health
- Michael L. Dustin, Washington University School of Medicine
- Karl Kandler, University of Pittsburgh
- Monica Kraft, National Jewish Medical and Research Center
- Charles E. Murry, University of Washington
- Leslie S. Ritter, University of Arizona at Tucson
- Henrique von Gersdorff, Oregon Health Sciences University

==== National Science Foundation ====
20 awardees:

- Sara C. Billey, Massachusetts Institute of Technology
- Reinhold Blumel, Wesleyan University
- Wilfredo Colón, Rensselaer Polytechnic Institute
- John N. DuPont, Lehigh University
- Carl T. Friedrichs, College of William and Mary
- Theresa Gaasterland, Rockefeller University
- Susan C. Hagness, University of Wisconsin-Madison
- Youssef Hashash, University of Illinois, Urbana Champaign
- Scott M. Husson, Clemson University
- Edwin C. Kan, Cornell University
- John David Kubiatowicz, University of California, Berkeley
- Alon Y. Levy, University of Washington
- Garrick E. Louis, University of Virginia
- Kwan-Liu Ma, University of California-Davis
- David L. Patrick, Western Washington University
- Georgia Perakis, Massachusetts Institute of Technology
- Anne S. Robinson, University of Delaware
- Jenny R. Saffran, University of Wisconsin-Madison
- Arthur R. Smith, Ohio University
- Kim Venn, Macalester College

=== 2001 ===
On June 26, 2002, President George W. Bush announced 60 PECASE recipients for 2001:

==== Department of Defense ====
- Douglas Edward Adams, Purdue University
- Raffaello D'Andrea, Cornell University
- Ronald Paul Fedkiw, Stanford University
- Scott Robert Manalis, Massachusetts Institute of Technology
- Jeffrey Dean Niemann, Pennsylvania State University
- Peter Alexander Traykovski, Woods Hole Oceanographic Institution

==== Department of Agriculture ====
- Morgan Grove, Forest Service, Burlington, Vermont
- Daniel Strawn, University of Idaho
- David L. Suarez, Agricultural Research Service, Athens, Georgia

==== Department of Commerce ====
- Steven S. Brown, NOAA Aeronomy Laboratory and the Cooperative Institute for Research in Environmental Sciences, Boulder, Colorado
- John M. Butler, National Institute of Standards and Technology
- Thomas M. Hamill, NOAA Climate Diagnostics Center and the Cooperative Institute for Research in Environmental Sciences, Boulder, Colorado
- Eric K. Lin, National Institute of Standards and Technology

==== Department of Health and Human Services: National Institutes of Health ====
12 awardees:

- Andrew E. Arai, National Institutes of Health
- Kelly N. Botteron, Washington University School of Medicine
- Regina M. Carelli, University of North Carolina at Chapel Hill, Chapel Hill
- Marshall S. Horwitz, University of Washington Medical School
- Jack J. Jiang, University of Wisconsin
- John A. Klingensmith, Duke University
- Michael P. Rout, The Rockefeller University
- William R. Schafer, University of California, San Diego
- Melissa J. Spencer, University of California, Los Angeles
- William Martin Usrey, University of California, Davis
- Leslie B. Vosshall, The Rockefeller University
- David Wotton, University of Virginia School of Medicine

==== Department of Energy ====
- Ian M. Anderson, Oak Ridge National Laboratory
- T. Vince Cianciolo, Oak Ridge National Laboratory
- Kenneth A. Gall, University of Colorado Boulder
- Mark C. Herrmann, Lawrence Livermore National Laboratory
- Paul M. Ricker, University of Chicago
- Z. John Zhang, Georgia Institute of Technology
- Jizhong Zhou, Oak Ridge National Laboratory

==== Department of Veterans Affairs ====
- Jeffrey R. Smith, VA Medical Center, Nashville, Tennessee
- James A. Tulsky, VA Health Services Research and Development Service Center of Excellence in Durham, North Carolina

==== National Aeronautics and Space Administration ====
- James J. Bock, NASA Jet Propulsion Laboratory
- Stephane Coutu, Pennsylvania State University
- James H. Crawford, NASA Langley Research Center
- William Mell, University of Utah
- Mark A. Moline, California Polytechnic State University
- Cheryl A. Nickerson, Tulane University Health Sciences Center

==== National Science Foundation ====
20 awardees:

- Philip John Bart, Louisiana State University
- Karen Jane Burg, Clemson University
- Brian David Conrad, University of Michigan
- Steven Andrew Cummer, Duke University
- Elizabeth Anna Davis, University of Michigan
- Reginald DesRoches, Georgia Institute of Technology
- Douglas John Emlen, University of Montana
- Michael C. Fitzgerald, Duke University
- Charles Forbes Gammie, University of Illinois Urbana-Champaign
- Javier Garcia-Frias, University of Delaware
- Richard Brent Gillespie, University of Michigan
- Satyandra Kumar Gupta, University of Maryland, College Park
- C. Allan Guymon, University of Southern Mississippi
- Sheena Sethi Iyengar, Columbia University
- Veena Misra, North Carolina State University
- Christine Ortiz, Massachusetts Institute of Technology
- Mona Singh, Princeton University
- Linda K. Weavers, Ohio State University
- Erik Winfree, California Institute of Technology
- Jorge Gabriel Zornberg, University of Colorado Boulder

=== 2002 ===
The 57 honorees in 2002:

==== Department of Agriculture ====
- Tara H. McHugh, Western Regional Research Center
- Mahfuzur Sarker, Oregon State University
- Therese M. Poland, Forest Service North Central Research Station

==== Department of Commerce ====
- Andrew W. Bruckner, National Oceanic and Atmospheric Administration
- Gabriel A. Vecchi, National Oceanic and Atmospheric Administration
- Jun Ye, National Institute of Standards and Technology
- Sae Woo Nam, National Institute of Standards and Technology

==== Department of Defense ====
- David Goldhaber-Gordon, Stanford University
- Hari C. Manoharan, Stanford University
- Michelle L. Pantoya, Texas Tech University
- Bridget Rogers, Vanderbilt University
- Venkatesh R. Saligrama, Boston University
- Gregory Neil Tew, University of Massachusetts

==== Department of Energy ====
- Jeffrey C. Blackmon, Oak Ridge National Laboratory
- Edmond Chow, Lawrence Livermore National Laboratory
- Sergei Maslov, Brookhaven National Laboratory
- Jonathan E. Menard, Princeton Plasma Physics Laboratory
- Christine Orme, Lawrence Livermore National Laboratory
- Krishnakumar Garikipati, University of Michigan
- Carl Boehlert, Alfred University

==== Department of Health and Human Services: National Institutes of Health ====
11 awardees:

- Dana Boatman, Johns Hopkins University
- Susan K. Buchanan, National Institute of Diabetes and Digestive and Kidney Diseases
- William Carlezon, Harvard Medical School
- David Cummings, School of Medicine, University of California, San Francisco
- Kirk Deitsch, Weill Medical College, Cornell University
- Abby Dernburg, Lawrence Berkeley National Laboratory
- Marilyn Diaz, National Institute of Environmental Health Sciences
- Catherine Drennan, Massachusetts Institute of Technology
- Andrew Griffin, National Institute on Deafness and other Communication Disorders
- Valery I. Shestapalov, University of Miami School of Medicine
- Richard Walker, Oregon Health and Science University

==== Department of Veterans Affairs ====
- Gary E. Bryson, West Haven Veterans Affairs Medical Center
- Richard Z. Lin, State University of New York at Stony Brook

==== National Aeronautics and Space Administration ====
- J. Marshall Shepherd, Goddard Space Flight Center
- Mark Simons, California Institute of Technology
- Eric R. Weeks, Emory University
- Thomas Zurbuchen, University of Michigan

==== National Science Foundation ====
20 awardees:

- Jennifer G. Becker, University of Maryland
- Squire J. Booker, Pennsylvania State University
- Susmita Bose, Washington State University
- Ian Dell'Antonio, Brown University
- J. Christian Gerdes, Stanford University
- Robert Ghrist, University of Illinois Urbana-Champaign
- Amy Greenwald, Brown University
- Babak Hassibi, California Institute of Technology
- Jason M. Haugh, North Carolina State University
- Jionghua (Judy) Jin, University of Arizona
- Julia Kubanek, Georgia Institute of Technology
- Mark E. Lewis, University of Michigan
- Jia G. Lu, University of California, Irvine
- Thomas McDade, Northwestern University
- George J. Pappas, University of Pennsylvania
- N. Sanjay Rebello, Kansas State University
- Dan M. Stamper-Kurn, University of California, Berkeley
- Ion Stoica, University of California, Berkeley
- Brian M. Stoltz, California Institute of Technology
- John R. Wakeley, Harvard University

=== 2003 ===
On September 9, 2004, President George W. Bush announced 57 honorees for 2003:

==== Department of Agriculture ====
- Timothy E. Link, University of Idaho
- Curtis P. Van Tassell, Agricultural Research Service
- Patrick A. Zollner, Forest Service North Central Research Station

==== Department of Commerce ====
- Sim D. Aberson, Atlantic Oceanographic and Meteorological Laboratory
- Scott A. Diddams, National Institute of Standards and Technology
- Jon R. Pratt, National Institute of Standards and Technology
- Kyle W. Shertzer, Southeast Fisheries Science Center

==== Department of Defense ====
- Brian P. Anderson, University of Arizona
- Vladimir Bulovic, Massachusetts Institute of Technology
- Rustem F. Ismagilov, University of Chicago
- Lyon B. King, Michigan Technological University
- Christopher Schuh, Massachusetts Institute of Technology
- Moe Z. Win, Massachusetts Institute of Technology

==== Department of Energy ====
- Tamara G. Kolda, Sandia National Laboratories
- Saskia Mioduszewski, Brookhaven National Laboratory
- Jian Shen, Oak Ridge National Laboratory
- Catherine M. Snelson, University of Nevada
- Margaret S. Torn, Lawrence Berkeley National Laboratory
- Donald P. Visco, Jr., Tennessee Technological University
- Brian D. Wirth, University of California, Berkeley

==== Department of Health and Human Services: National Institutes of Health ====
12 awardees:

- Matthew I. Banks, University of Wisconsin-Madison
- Leonardo Belluscio, National Institute of Neurological Disorders and Stroke
- Linzhao Cheng, Johns Hopkins University
- William DeBello, University of California, Davis
- Michael B. Eisen, University of California, Berkeley
- Stuart Forman, Massachusetts General Hospital
- Peter D. Kwong, National Institute of Allergy and Infectious Diseases
- Anne M. Moon, University of Utah
- Sean J. Morrison, University of Michigan
- Steven D. Munger, University of Maryland School of Medicine
- Stephanie B. Seminara, Harvard Medical School
- Brian D. Strahl, University of North Carolina at Chapel Hill, Chapel Hill

==== Department of Veterans Affairs ====
- Steven M. Asch, Los Angeles Veterans Health Services
- Albert C. Lo, West Haven Veterans Administration

==== National Aeronautics and Space Administration ====
- Stuart D. Bale, University of California, Berkeley
- Carlos Del Castillo, Stennis Space Center
- Sarah T. Stewart-Mukhopadhyay, Harvard University

==== National Science Foundation ====
20 awardees:

- Treena L. Arinzeh, New Jersey Institute of Technology
- Paola Barbara, Georgetown University
- Carla E. Cáceres, University of Illinois Urbana-Champaign
- Harry J. Dankowicz, Virginia Polytechnic Institute and State University
- Daniel R. Gamelin, University of Washington
- Arjun M. Heimsath, Dartmouth College
- Joseph Henrich, Emory University
- Jennifer S. Lerner, Carnegie Mellon University
- Yoky Matsuoka, Carnegie Mellon University
- Roxana A. Moreno, University of New Mexico
- Kara L. Nelson, University of California, Berkeley
- Erica L. Plambeck, Stanford University
- Carla Mattos, North Carolina State University
- Juan G. Santiago, Stanford University
- Cyrus Shahabi, University of Southern California
- Sandeep K. Shukla, Virginia Polytechnic Institute and State University
- Kimmen Sjölander, University of California, Berkeley
- Elisabeth Smela, University of Maryland, College Park
- Konstantina Trivisa, University of Maryland, College Park
- Ravi D. Vakil, Stanford University

=== 2004 ===
On June 13, 2005, President George W. Bush announced 58 awardees for 2004:

==== Department of Agriculture ====
- Edward S. Buckler IV, Agricultural Research Service
- Devin G. Peterson, Pennsylvania State University
- Michael K. Schwartz, USDA Forest Service

==== Department of Commerce ====
- Daniel J. Cziczo, National Oceanic and Atmospheric Administration
- Michael J. Fasolka, National Institute of Standards and Technology
- Philip Roni, National Oceanic and Atmospheric Administration
- Joel N. Ullom, National Institute of Standards and Technology

==== Department of Defense ====
- Ali Adibi, Georgia Institute of Technology
- Marija Drndic, University of Pennsylvania
- David S. Ginger, University of Washington
- John C. Howell, University of Rochester
- Raadhakrishnan Poovendran, University of Washington
- Mark J. Schnitzer, Stanford University

==== Department of Energy ====
- John R. Arrington, Argonne National Laboratory
- William J. Ashmanskas, Fermi National Accelerator Laboratory
- Wei Cai, Stanford University
- William P. King, Georgia Institute of Technology
- Yunfeng Lu, Tulane University
- Hong Qin, Princeton Plasma Physics Laboratory
- Robert B. Ross, Argonne National Laboratory
- Paul Vaska, Brookhaven National Laboratory
- Zhangbu Xu, Brookhaven National Laboratory

==== Department of Health and Human Services: National Institutes of Health ====
12 awardees:

- Luis R. Garcia, Texas A&M University
- Catherine M. Gordon, Boston Children's Hospital
- Joanna C. Jen, University of California, Los Angeles
- Yuhong Jiang, Harvard University
- Neil L. Kelleher, University of Illinois
- Tejvir S. Khurana, University of Pennsylvania
- Robin F. Krimm, University of Louisville
- Suneeta Krishnan, University of California, San Francisco
- Kenneth D. Mandl, Children's Hospital of Boston
- Marisela Morales, National Institute on Drug Abuse
- Teresa A. Nicolson, Oregon Health and Science University
- Brenda A. Schulman, St. Jude Children's Research Hospital

==== Department of Veterans Affairs ====
- William M. Grady, University of Washington
- Kevin G. Volpp, University of Pennsylvania

==== National Aeronautics and Space Administration ====
- David Alexander, Rice University
- Michael G. Bosilovich, National Aeronautics and Space Administration

==== National Science Foundation ====
20 awardees:

- David V. Anderson, Georgia Institute of Technology
- Paul H. Barber, Boston University
- Michael A. Bevan, Texas A&M University
- Derrick T. Brazill, City University of New York, Hunter College
- Frank L. H. Brown, University of California, Santa Barbara
- Marianella Casasola, Cornell University
- Elaine Chew, University of Southern California
- Martin L. Culpepper, Massachusetts Institute of Technology
- Oscar D. Dubon Jr., University of California, Berkeley
- Michael J. Garvin II, Columbia University
- Sean Gavin, Wayne State University
- Jennifer A. Jay, University of California, Los Angeles
- Jun Jiao, Portland State University
- Shalinee Kishore, Lehigh University
- Wei Li, University of Washington
- Donna L. Maney, Emory University
- Daniel J. Mindiola, Indiana University
- Becky W. Packard, Mount Holyoke College
- Russell S. Schwartz, Carnegie Mellon University
- Chengxiang Zhai, University of Illinois, Urbana-Champaign

=== 2005 ===
The 56 honorees for the year 2005:

==== Department of Agriculture ====
- Christopher John Fettig, USDA Forest Service
- Joseph Martin Jez, USDA Donald Danforth Plant Science Center
- David Brian Johnston, USDA Agricultural Research Service

==== Department of Commerce ====
- Arlene Fiore Field, National Oceanic and Atmospheric Administration
- Katherine Ann Lefebvre, National Oceanic and Atmospheric Administration
- James Vincent Porto III, National Institute of Standards and Technology
- Christopher Lloyd Soles, National Institute of Standards and Technology

==== Department of Education ====
- Laura M. Justice, University of Virginia

==== Department of Energy ====
- Daniel Wayne Bardayan, Oak Ridge National Laboratory
- Todd Munson, Argonne National Laboratory
- Christopher John Roy, Auburn University
- Wynne Katherine Schiffer, Brookhaven National Laboratory
- Wendelin Jane Wright, Stanford University
- Yanwen Zhang, Pacific Northwest National Laboratory
- Michael Anthony Zingale, University of California, Santa Cruz

==== Department of Defense ====
- Randy Alan Bartels, Colorado State University
- Kelly Jo Benoit Bird, Oregon State University
- Mark Christopher Hersam, Northwestern University
- Jennifer Eve Hoffman, Harvard University
- Ju Li, Ohio State University
- Kenneth Martin O'Hara, Pennsylvania State University

==== Department of Health and Human Services: National Institutes of Health ====
12 awardees:

- Sohyun Ahn, National Institutes of Health
- Daniel Howard Appella, National Institutes of Health
- Karl Alexander Deisseroth, Stanford University
- Kathryn Pitkin Derose, RAND Corporation
- Carolyn Debra Michelle Furr Holden, Pacific Institute for Research and Evaluation
- Nace Leon Golding, University of Texas at Austin
- Isabel Beatriz Luna Herrera, University of Pittsburgh
- Tannishtha Reya, Duke University
- Karissa Sanbonmatsu, Los Alamos National Laboratory
- Melanie Sarah Sanford, University of Michigan
- Yihua (Bruce) Yu, University of Utah
- Neal Scott Silverman, University of Massachusetts

==== Department of Veterans Affairs ====
- David Jonathan Casarett, University of Pennsylvania
- Jennifer Louise Gooch, Emory University

==== National Aeronautics and Space Administration ====
- Jianli Chen, University of Texas at Austin

==== National Science Foundation ====
20 awardees:

- Marina Umaschi Bers, Tufts University
- Eugene Joseph Billiot, Texas A&M University, Corpus Christi
- Rachel Melissa Brewster, University of Maryland, Baltimore County
- Silvia Ferrari, Duke University
- Shelly Lyne Gable Nayak, University of California, Los Angeles
- Julia Eve Hammer, University of Hawaii
- Ashley Jean James, University of Minnesota, Twin Cities
- Tracy Lanise Johnson, University of California, San Diego
- Scott David Kelly, University of Illinois, Urbana-Champaign
- Anna Kathryn Mapp, University of Michigan
- Thomas Leonard Martin, Virginia Polytechnic Institute and State University
- Jonathan Christopher Mattingly, Duke University
- Benjamin John McCall, University of Illinois, Urbana-Champaign
- Suzie Hwang Pun, University of Washington
- Rebeca Bat-Sheba Rosengaus-Nurko, Northeastern University, Boston
- Aravinthan Daniel Thevapirian Samuel, Harvard University
- William Edward Schuler, University of Minnesota, Twin Cities
- James Earl Smay, Oklahoma State University
- Michael Steven Strano, University of Illinois, Urbana-Champaign
- Meiling (Janet) Wang, University of Arizona, Tucson

=== 2006 ===
The 58 honorees for 2006:

==== Department of Agriculture ====
- Douglas D. Bannerman, USDA Agricultural Research Service
- Sarah D. Brooks, Texas A&M University
- Samuel A. Cushman, USDA Forest Service

==== Department of Commerce ====
- Casey Brown, Columbia University
- Mark Scheuerell, National Oceanic and Atmospheric Administration
- Joshua C. Bienfang, National Institute of Standards and Technology

==== Department of Defense ====
- Odest C. Jenkins, Brown University
- Kenneth C. Slatton, University of Florida
- Jonathan E. Spanier, Drexel University
- Jacob L. Roberts, Colorado State University
- Krystyn J. Van Vliet, Massachusetts Institute of Technology
- Jelena Vučković, Stanford University
- Jennifer Hoffman, Harvard University

==== Department of Education ====
- Carol McDonald Connor, Florida State University

==== Department of Energy ====
- Kyle Cranmer, Brookhaven National Laboratory
- Brian J. Kirby, Cornell University
- Jeffrey W. Kysar, Columbia University
- Julia Laskin, Pacific Northwest National Laboratory
- Ho Nyung Lee, Oak Ridge National Laboratory
- Shawn Newsam, University of California, Merced
- Carlos Pantano-Rubino, University of Illinois
- Len A. Pennacchio, Lawrence Berkeley National Laboratory

==== Department of Health and Human Services: National Institutes of Health ====
12 awardees:

- Katrina Akassoglou, University of California, San Diego
- Jeanmarie Houghton, University of Massachusetts
- Jay R. Hove, University of Cincinnati
- Sven-Eric Jordt, Yale University
- Susan M. Kaech, Yale University Susan Kaech
- Bruce D. McCandliss, Cornell University
- Alexandra C. McPherron, National Institutes of Health
- Gus R. Rosania, University of Michigan
- J. Peter Rubin, University of Pittsburgh
- Ravindra N. Singh *, Iowa State University
- Michelle P. Winn, Duke University
- Adam T. Woolley, Brigham Young University

==== Department of Veterans Affairs ====
- Sterling C. Johnson, William S. Middleton VA Hospital
- William S. Yancy, Jr., Durham VA Medical Center

==== National Aeronautics and Space Administration ====
- Olivier Guyon, Subaru Telescope
- Matthew Rodell, Goddard Space Flight Center

==== National Science Foundation ====
20 awardees:

- Sonya Bahar, University of Missouri-St. Louis
- Bahar Biller, Carnegie-Mellon University
- Matthew J. Fouch, Arizona State University
- Eric C. Greene, Columbia University
- Pradeep R. Guduru, Brown University
- Jenefer Husman, Arizona State University
- Dean S. Karlan, Yale University
- Brian G. Keating, University of California, San Diego
- Kiran Kedlaya, Massachusetts Institute of Technology
- Edward Kohler, University of California, Los Angeles
- J. Nicholas Laneman, University of Notre Dame
- Chekesha M. Liddell, Cornell University
- Elliot Moore II, Georgia Institute of Technology
- Amy J. Pruden-Bagchi, Colorado State University
- Carlos Rinaldi, University of Puerto Rico, Mayaguez
- James P. Schmiedeler, Ohio State University
- Ahna Skop, University of Wisconsin
- Yi Tang, University of California, Los Angeles
- Joseph W. Thornton, University of Oregon, Eugene
- Lisa M. Zurk, Portland State University

=== 2007 ===
The 67 honorees for 2007:

==== Department of Agriculture ====
- Valerie T. Eviner, University of California, Davis - USDA, Cooperative State Research, Education, and Extension Service
- Wendell R. Haag, USDA, Forest Service
- Zhongli Pan, USDA, Agricultural Research Service

==== Department of Commerce ====
- Yi Ming, National Oceanic and Atmospheric Administration
- William H. Rippard, National Institute for Standards and Technology
- Raymond Simmonds, National Institute for Standards and Technology

==== Department of Defense ====
15 awardees:

- Mung Chiang, Princeton University
- Stefano Curtarolo, Duke University
- Chad D. Fertig, University of Georgia
- Maya Gupta, University of Washington
- Brian A. Lail, Florida Institute of Technology
- Zhenqiang Ma, University of Wisconsin–Madison
- Ravi Ramamoorthi, Columbia University
- Purnima Ratilal, Northeastern University
- Tim Roughgarden, Stanford University
- Rachel A. Segalman, University of California, Berkeley
- Max Shtein, University of Michigan
- Enrique R. Vivoni, New Mexico Institute of Mining & Technology
- Krista S. Walton, Kansas State University
- Haiyan Wang, Texas A&M University
- Shengli Zhou, University of Connecticut

==== Department of Education ====
- Gregory A. Fabiano, University of Buffalo
- Nicole M. McNeil, University of Notre Dame

==== Department of Energy ====
- Mickey G. Chiu, Brookhaven National Laboratory
- Hooman Davoudiasl, Brookhaven National Laboratory
- Bert Debusschere, Sandia National Laboratories
- Jennifer S. Martinez, Los Alamos National Laboratory
- Wei Pan, Sandia National Laboratories
- Robin Santra, Argonne National Laboratory
- Yugang Sun, Argonne National Laboratory
- Jeanine Cook, New Mexico State University

==== Department of Health and Human Services: National Institutes of Health ====
12 awardees:

- Daphne W. Bell, National Human Genome Research Center, National Institutes of Health
- Thomas A. Blanpied, University of Maryland, School of Medicine
- Kevin C. Eggan, Harvard University
- Raymond Habas, University of Medicine and Dentistry of New Jersey
- Amy Heimberger, University of Texas
- James C. Iatridis, University of Vermont
- Francis S. Lee, Cornell University
- Michael J. MacCoss, University of Washington
- Elliott H. Margulies, National Human Genome Research Institute, National Institutes of Health
- Suchitra Nelson, Case Western Reserve University
- Laura E. O'Dell, University of Texas, El Paso
- Li Zhang, University of Southern California, Los Angeles

==== Department of Veterans Affairs ====
- Mary Bethe Humphrey, Oklahoma City VA Medical Center

==== National Aeronautics and Space Administration ====
- Charles Kankelborg, Montana State University
- Anna M. Michalak, University of Michigan, Ann Arbor
- Merav Opher, George Mason University

==== National Science Foundation ====
20 awardees:

- Monica Medina, University of California, Merced
- Michael Elowitz, California Institute of Technology
- Sonia Altizer, University of Georgia
- Subhasish Mitra, Stanford University
- Stergios Roumeliotis, University of Minnesota
- Sanjit Seshia, University of California, Berkeley
- Nick Feamster, Georgia Institute of Technology
- Jeremy Gray, Yale University
- Maura J. Borrego, Virginia Polytechnic Institute and State University
- Xi Chen, Columbia University
- Sanjay Lall, Stanford University
- Andre W. Marshall, University of Maryland, College Park
- Aaron M. Thomas, University of Idaho
- Joan L. Walker, Boston University
- Kim Cobb, Georgia Institute of Technology
- Michael Yu, Johns Hopkins University
- Alexander Gamburd, University of California, Santa Cruz
- Anastasia Volovich, Brown University
- Katrina Miranda, University of Arizona
- Paul Torrens, Arizona State University

=== 2008 ===
The 100 honorees for 2008:

==== Department of Agriculture ====
- David H. McNear Jr., University of Kentucky
- Dean E. Pearson, Rocky Mt. Res. Station
- Erica Spackman, Poultry Res. Lab/USDA

==== Department of Commerce ====
- Craig Brown, National Institute of Standards and Technology
- Michael C. Coniglio, National Severe Storms Laboratory
- Dana H. Hanselman, Auke Bay Laboratory
- Pamela L. Heinselman, National Severe Storms Laboratory
- Dean DeLongchamp, National Institute of Standards and Technology
- Till P. Rosenband, National Institute of Standards and Technology

==== Department of Defense ====
41 awardees:

- David P. Arnold, University of Florida
- Seth R. Bank, University of Texas at Austin
- Christopher W. Bielawski, University of Texas at Austin
- Elizabeth M. Boon, Stony Brook University
- Markus J. Buehler, Massachusetts Institute of Technology
- Scott A. Craver, Binghamton University
- John O. Dabiri, California Institute of Technology
- Chris L. Dwyer, Duke University
- Gregory S. Engel, University of Chicago
- Thomas H. Epps III, University of Delaware
- Gregory A. Fiete, University of Texas at Austin
- Oliver Fringer, Stanford University
- Anthony Grbic, University of Michigan
- Carlos E. Guestrin, Carnegie Mellon University
- Michael A. Hickner, Penn State University
- Michael J. Hochberg, University of Washington
- Yu Huang, University of California, Los Angeles
- Gregory H. Huff, Texas A&M University
- Jacob L. Jones, University of Florida
- Sanjay Kumar, University of California, Berkeley
- Xiaoqin Li, University of Texas at Austin
- Mathew M. Maye, Syracuse University
- Leigh S. McCue-Weil, Virginia Polytechnic Institute and State University
- Beverley J. McKeon, California Institute of Technology
- Anastasia H. Muliana, Texas A&M University
- Ryan P. O'Hayre, Colorado School of Mines
- Jiwoong Park, Cornell University
- Susan E. Parks, Penn State University
- Jason R. Petta, Princeton University
- Justin K. Romberg, Georgia Institute of Technology
- Adrienne Stiff-Roberts, Duke University
- Benjamin R. tenOever, Mt. Sinai School of Medicine
- Joel Tropp, California Institute of Technology
- Derek H. Warner, Cornell University
- Sharon M. Weiss, Vanderbilt University
- Patrick J. Wolfe, Harvard University
- Robert J. Wood, Harvard University
- Tanya Zelevinsky, Columbia University
- Jianglong Zhang, University of North Dakota
- Xiaolin Zheng, Stanford University
- Rashid Zia, Brown University

==== Department of Education ====
- Nonie K. Lesaux, Harvard University
- Katherine A. Rawson, Kent State University

==== Department of Energy ====
12 awardees:

- Cecilia R. Aragon, Lawrence Berkeley National Laboratory
- Gary A. Baker, Oak Ridge National Laboratory
- Joshua A. Breslau, Princeton Plasma Physics
- Gianluigi Ciovati, Thomas Jefferson Lab National Accelerator Facility
- Stefan P. Gerhardt, Princeton Plasma Physics
- Lynford L. Goddard, University of Illinois
- Jason Graetz, Brookhaven National Laboratory
- Jeffrey B. Neaton, Lawrence Berkeley National Laboratory
- Thao D. Nguyen, Johns Hopkins University
- Paul Sorensen, Brookhaven National Laboratory
- Alexandre M. Tartakovsky, Pacific Northwest National Laboratory
- Ivan Vitev, Los Alamos National Laboratory

==== Department of Veterans Affairs ====
- Melina R. Kibbe, Jesse Brown VA
- Alexander H. Sox-Harris, Palo Alto VA

==== National Aeronautics and Space Administration ====
- Benjamin E. Smith, University of Washington
- Joshua K. Willis, Jet Propulsion Laboratory

==== National Institutes of Health, Department of Health and Human Services ====
12 awardees:

- Thomas P. Cappola, University of Pennsylvania
- Pablo A. Celnik, Johns Hopkins University
- Felicia D. Goodrum, University of Arizona
- Bruce J. Hinds III, University of Kentucky
- Helen H. Lu, Columbia University
- Ulrike Peters, Fred Hutchinson Cancer Center
- Jeremy Reiter, University of California, San Francisco
- Marisa Roberto, The Scripps Research Institute
- Erica O. Saphire, The Scripps Research Institute
- Oscar E. Suman, Shriner's Hospital, University of Texas
- Kristin V. Tarbell, The National Institute of Diabetes and Digestive and Kidney Diseases
- Gonzalo E. Torres, University of Pittsburgh

==== National Science Foundation ====
20 awardees:

- Maria M. Calbi, Southern Illinois University, Carbondale
- Amy B. Cerato, University of Oklahoma
- Ioannis Chasiotis, University of Illinois
- Monica Cox, Purdue University
- Cameron R. Currie, University of Wisconsin
- Joel L. Dawson, Massachusetts Institute of Technology
- Jimmy de la Torre, Rutgers University
- Roland G. Fryer Jr., Harvard University
- Sean Hallgren, Penn State University
- John M. Herbert, Ohio State University
- Steven D. Jacobsen, Northwestern University
- Charles R. Keeton II, Rutgers University
- Chun Ning Lau, University of California, Riverside
- Hao Lin, Rutgers University
- Harmit S. Malik, Fred Hutchinson Cancer Center
- Rada F. Mihalcea, University of North Texas
- Scott R. Sheffield, Massachusetts Institute of Technology
- Zuzanna S. Siwy, University of California, Irvine
- Adam D. Smith, Penn State University
- Joy K. Ward, University of Kansas

=== 2009 ===
The 89 honorees for 2009:

==== Department of Agriculture ====
- Lee K. Cerveny, Forest Service
- Michael L. Looper, Agricultural Research Service
- Jeffrey S. Ross-Ibarra, University of California, Davis

==== Department of Commerce ====
- R. David Holbrook, Jr., National Institute of Standards and Technology
- Daniel S. Hussey, National Institute of Standards and Technology
- Ian B. Spielman, National Institute of Standards and Technology
- Matthew J. Menne, National Oceanic and Atmospheric Administration
- Charles A. Stock, National Oceanic and Atmospheric Administration
- J. Christopher Taylor, National Oceanic and Atmospheric Administration

==== Department of Defense ====
15 awardees:

- Andrea M. Armani, University of Southern California
- Adam E. Cohen, Harvard University
- Eugenio Culurciello, Yale University
- Nathan C. Gianneschi, University of California, San Diego
- Ryan C. Hayward, University of Massachusetts, Amherst
- Andrew A. Houck, Princeton University
- Farinaz Koushanfar, Rice University
- Emilia Morosan, Rice University
- Abhay P. Narayan, Columbia University
- Matthew A. Oehlschlaeger, Rensselaer Polytechnic Institute
- Willie J. Padilla, Boston College
- Eric Pop, University of Illinois Urbana-Champaign
- Michelle Povinelli, University of Southern California
- Emily A. Weiss, Northwestern University
- Martin W. Zwierlein, Massachusetts Institute of Technology

==== Department of Education ====
- Catherine P. Bradshaw, Johns Hopkins Bloomberg School of Public Health
- Jennifer G. Cromley, Temple University

==== Department of Energy ====
13 awardees:

- Ilke Arslan, University of California, Davis
- Eric D. Bauer, Los Alamos National Laboratory
- Jeremy T. Busby, Oak Ridge National Laboratory
- Gavin E. Crooks, Lawrence Berkeley National Laboratory
- Juan Estrada, Fermi National Accelerator Laboratory
- Dillon D. Fong, Argonne National Laboratory
- Jacob M. Hooker, Brookhaven National Laboratory
- Gianluca Iaccarino, Stanford University
- De-en Jiang, Oak Ridge National Laboratory
- Sergei V. Kalinin, Oak Ridge National Laboratory
- Trent R. Northen, Lawrence Berkeley National Laboratory
- Elena V. Shevchenko, Argonne National Laboratory
- Jacob G. Wacker, SLAC National Accelerator Laboratory

==== Department of the Interior ====
- Jeanne L. Hardebeck, U.S. Geological Survey
- Nicolas Luco, U.S. Geological Survey
- Pamela L. Nagler, U.S. Geological Survey

==== Department of Veterans Affairs ====
- Pamela J. VandeVord, Wayne State University
- Rachel M. Werner, Philadelphia VA Medical Center

==== National Aeronautics and Space Administration ====
- Matthew J. Oliver, University of Delaware
- Rahul Ramachandran, The University of Alabama in Huntsville

==== National Institutes of Health, Department of Health and Human Services ====
20 awardees:

- Dominique C. Bergmann, Stanford University
- Edward A. Botchwey III, University of Virginia
- Brian P. Brooks, National Eye Institute, NIH
- Mauricio R. Delgado, Rutgers, The State University of New Jersey
- Amy N. Finkelstein, Massachusetts Institute of Technology
- Alfredo Fontanini, State University of New York, Stony Brook
- Manolis Kellis, Massachusetts Institute of Technology
- Jessica Y. Lee, University of North Carolina at Chapel Hill at Chapel Hill
- Bradley A. Malin, Vanderbilt University Medical Center
- Ana P. Martinez-Donate, University of Wisconsin-Madison
- Kimberly Nixon, University of Kentucky
- Caryn E. Outten, University of South Carolina
- Muneesh Tewari, Fred Hutchinson Cancer Research Center
- Doris Y. Tsao, California Institute of Technology
- Charles P. Venditti, National Human Genome Research Institute, NIH
- Amy J. Wagers, Joslin Diabetes Center
- Ziv Williams, Massachusetts General Hospital
- Joseph C. Wu, Stanford University School of Medicine
- Haoxing Xu, University of Michigan
- Martin T. Zanni, University of Wisconsin-Madison

==== National Science Foundation ====
19 awardees:

- Scott J. Aaronson, Massachusetts Institute of Technology
- David M. Amodio, New York University
- Alexandre M. Bayen, University of California, Berkeley
- Rachel E. Bean, Cornell University
- Magdalena Bezanilla, University of Massachusetts, Amherst
- Jose H. Blanchet Mancilla, Columbia University
- Virginia A. Davis, Auburn University
- Jayne C. Garno, Louisiana State University
- Michael T. Laub, Massachusetts Institute of Technology
- Steven K. Lower, The Ohio State University
- Jerome P. Lynch, University of Michigan
- Malcolm A. MacIver, Northwestern University
- Shelie A. Miller, University of Michigan
- Reza Olfati-Saber, Dartmouth College
- Laura E. Schulz, Massachusetts Institute of Technology
- Joshua W. Shaevitz, Princeton University
- Ivan I. Smalyukh, University of Colorado Boulder
- Edo Waks, University of Maryland, College Park
- Katrin Wehrheim, Massachusetts Institute of Technology

=== 2010 ===
On September 26, 2011, President Obama honored 94 scientists:

==== Department of Agriculture ====
- Laura L. Bellows, Colorado State University
- Jonathan G. Lundgren, Agricultural Research Service
- Samuel L. Zelinka, U.S. Forest Service

==== Department of Commerce ====
- Jeffrey A. Fagan, National Institute of Standards and Technology
- James A. Morris Jr, National Oceanic and Atmospheric Administration
- Erin M. Oleson, National Oceanic and Atmospheric Administration
- David E. Richardson, National Oceanic and Atmospheric Administration
- Kartik A. Srinivasan, National Institute of Standards and Technology
- Jacob M. Taylor, National Institute of Standards and Technology

==== Department of Defense ====
16 awardees:

- Michael S. Arnold, University of Wisconsin–Madison
- Jeffrey W. Book, Naval Research Laboratory
- Tad T. Brunye, U.S. Army Natick Soldier Research, Development and Engineering Center
- Dirk R. Englund, Columbia University
- Ali Khademhosseini, Harvard Medical School and Brigham and Women's Hospital
- Reuben H. Kraft, U.S. Army Research Laboratory
- Tonghun Lee, Michigan State University
- Anne J. McNeil, University of Michigan
- Aydogan Ozcan, University of California, Los Angeles
- Tomas A. Palacios, Massachusetts Institute of Technology
- Sumita Pennathur, University of California, Santa Barbara
- Kyle M. Shen, Cornell University
- Amit Singer, Princeton University
- Stephen M. Spottswood, U.S. Air Force Research Laboratory
- Joseph M. Teran, University of California, Los Angeles
- Lan Yang, Washington University in St. Louis

==== Department of Education ====
- Roy Levy, Arizona State University

==== Department of Energy ====
13 awardees:

- Christian W. Bauer, Lawrence Berkeley National Laboratory
- Greg Bronevetsky, Lawrence Livermore National Laboratory
- Fotini Katopodes Chow, University of California, Berkeley
- Carole Dabney-Smith, Miami University
- David Erickson, Cornell University
- Daniel C. Fredrickson, University of Wisconsin—Madison
- Christiane Jablonowski, University of Michigan
- Gang Logan Liu, University of Illinois Urbana-Champaign
- Alysia D. Marino, University of Colorado Boulder
- Victoria Orphan, California Institute of Technology
- Wei-Jun Qian, Pacific Northwest National Laboratory
- Evgenya I. Simakov, Los Alamos National Laboratory
- Feng Wang, University of California, Berkeley

==== Department of the Interior ====
- Sasha C. Reed, U.S. Geological Survey
- David R. Shelly, U.S. Geological Survey

==== Department of Transportation ====
- Kristin C. Lewis, Volpe National Transportation Systems Center

==== Department of Veterans Affairs ====
- Tanya Z. Fischer, Veterans Health Administration
- Christine M. Freeman, Veterans Health Administration
- B. Price Kerfoot, Veterans Health Administration and Harvard Medical School
- DKristina M. Utzschneider, Veterans Health Administration and University of Washington

==== Environmental Protection Agency ====
- Gayle S.W. Hagler, National Risk Management Research Laboratory
- David M. Reif, National Center for Computational Toxicology

==== National Aeronautics and Space Administration ====
- Jonathan W. Cirtain, Marshall Space Flight Center
- Ian M. Howat, The Ohio State University
- Gregory G. Howes, University of Iowa
- Benjamin A. Mazin, University of California, Santa Barbara

==== National Institutes of Health, Department of Health and Human Services ====
20 awardees:

- Rommie E. Amaro, University of California, Irvine
- Sonja M. Best, National Institute of Allergy and Infectious Diseases
- David T. Breault, Children's Hospital Boston
- John Brownstein, Children's Hospital Boston
- Brian S. Caffo, Johns Hopkins University
- Nicola J. Camp, University of Utah
- Pierre R. Comizzoli, Smithsonian Institution
- Chyke A. Doubeni, University of Massachusetts Medical School
- Jose C. Florez, Massachusetts General Hospital and the Broad Institute
- James L. Gulley, National Cancer Institute
- W. Nicholas Haining, Harvard Medical School
- Thomas L. Kash, University of North Carolina at Chapel Hill School of Medicine
- John C. March, Cornell University
- Katherine L. O'Brien, Johns Hopkins Bloomberg School of Public Health
- Carla M. Pugh, Northwestern University Feinberg School of Medicine
- Jamie L. Renbarger, Indiana University
- Sara L. Sawyer, University of Texas at Austin
- Hari Shroff, National Institute of Biomedical Imaging and Bioengineering
- Mary Jo Trepka, Florida International University
- Linda E. Wilbrecht, University of California, San Francisco

==== National Science Foundation ====
21 awardees:

- Katherine Aidala, Mount Holyoke College
- Hatice Altug, Boston University
- Salman A. Avestimehr, Cornell University
- Joshua C. Bongard, University of Vermont
- David J. Brumley, Carnegie Mellon University
- Elizabeth S. Cochran, U.S. Geological Survey
- Noah J. Cowan, Johns Hopkins University
- Xiangfeng Duan, University of California, Los Angeles
- Michael J. Escuti, North Carolina State University
- Demetra C. Evangelou, Purdue University
- Benjamin A. Garcia, Princeton University
- Tina A. Grotzer, Harvard Graduate School of Education
- Lasse Jensen, Pennsylvania State University
- Benjamin Kerr, University of Washington
- Benjamin L. Lev, Stanford University
- Elena G. Litchman, Michigan State University
- Yasamin Mostofi, University of New Mexico
- Lilianne R. Mujica-Parodi, State University of New York at Stony Brook
- Andre D. Taylor, Yale University
- Claudia R. Valeggia, University of Pennsylvania
- Maria G. Westdickenberg, Georgia Institute of Technology

==== Smithsonian Institution ====
- Justin C. Kasper, Smithsonian Astrophysical Observatory

=== 2011 ===
On July 23, 2012, President Obama presented 97 scientists with the award for 2011:

==== Department of Agriculture ====
- Joseph E. Jakes, U.S. Forest Service
- Ian Kaplan, Purdue University
- Christina L. Swaggerty, Agricultural Research Service

==== Department of Commerce ====
- Anthony Arguez, National Oceanic and Atmospheric Administration
- Ian Coddington, National Institute of Standards and Technology
- Frank W. DelRio, National Institute of Standards and Technology
- Jayne Billmayer Morrow, National Institute of Standards and Technology
- Kyle S. Van Houtan, National Oceanic and Atmospheric Administration
- Rebecca Washenfelder, National Oceanic and Atmospheric Administration

==== Department of Defense ====
16 awardees:

- David M. Blei, Princeton University
- Ania Bleszynski Jayich, University of California, Santa Barbara
- Alejandro L. Briseno, University of Massachusetts, Amherst
- Lee R. Cambrea, Naval Air Research Intelligence
- Vincent Conitzer, Duke University
- Chiara Daraio, California Institute of Technology
- Craig J. Fennie, Cornell University
- Keith Edward Knipling, Naval Research Laboratory, Department of the Navy
- Wen Li, Wayne State University
- Timothy K. Lu, Massachusetts Institute of Technology
- Cindy Regal, University of Colorado Boulder
- Matthew B. Squires, Air Force Research Laboratory, Department of the Air Force
- Joseph E. Subotnik, University of Pennsylvania
- Ao Tang, Cornell University
- C. Shad Thaxton, Northwestern University
- Maria Laina Urso, U.S. Army Research Institute for Environmental Medicine

==== Department of Education ====
- Li Cai, University of California, Los Angeles

==== Department of Energy ====
13 awardees:

- Stanley Atcitty, Sandia National Laboratories
- Jeffrey W. Banks, Lawrence Livermore National Laboratory
- Amy J. Clarke, Los Alamos National Laboratory
- Derek R. Gaston, Idaho National Laboratory
- Christopher Hirata, California Institute of Technology
- Heileen Hsu-Kim, Duke University
- Thomas Francisco Jaramillo, Stanford University
- Pablo Jarillo-Herrero, Massachusetts Institute of Technology
- John R. Kitchin, Carnegie Mellon University
- Peter Mueller, Argonne National Laboratory
- Daniel B. Sinars, Sandia National Laboratories
- Jesse Thaler, Massachusetts Institute of Technology
- Heather Whitley, Lawrence Livermore National Laboratory

==== Department of Health and Human Services ====
22 awardees, 20 nominated by the NIH and 2 by the CDC:

- Erez Lieberman Aiden, Harvard University
- Nihal Altan-Bonnet, Rutgers University
- Peter D. Crompton, National Institute of Allergy and Infectious Diseases
- Margherita R. Fontana, University of Michigan School of Dentistry
- Ervin Ray Fox, University of Mississippi Medical Center
- Valerie Horsley, Yale University
- Steven T. Kosak, Northwestern University Feinberg School of Medicine
- Erica N. Larschan, Brown University
- Daniel R. Larson, National Cancer Institute
- Krista M. Lisdahl, University of Wisconsin – Milwaukee
- Emanual Maverakis, University of California, Davis
- Biju Parekkadan, Massachusetts General Hospital and Harvard Medical School
- Jay Zachary Parrish, University of Washington
- Peter Philip Reese, University of Pennsylvania
- Niels Ringstad, Skirball Institute, New York University School of Medicine
- Pawan Sinha, Massachusetts Institute of Technology
- Georgios Skiniotis, University of Michigan
- Beth Stevens, F.M. Kirby Neurobiology Center, Boston Children's Hospital
- Justin Taraska, National Heart, Lung, and Blood Institute
- Jennifer Rabke Verani, National Center for Immunization and Respiratory Diseases
- Brendan M. Walker, Washington State University
- Lauren Bailey Zapata, National Center for Chronic Disease Prevention and Health Promotion

==== Department of the Interior ====
- Joseph P. Colgan, U.S. Geological Survey
- Karen R. Felzer, U.S. Geological Survey
- Justin J. Hagerty, U.S. Geological Survey

==== Department of Veterans Affairs ====
- Jeffrey R. Capadona, Louis Stokes Cleveland Veteran Affairs Medical Center
- Charlesnika T. Evans, Edward Hines Jr. Veterans Affairs Hospital
- Amy M. Kilbourne, Veterans Affairs Ann Arbor Healthcare System
- Kinh Luan Phan, Jesse Brown Veterans Affairs Medical Center

==== Environmental Protection Agency ====
- Adam P. Eisele, U.S. Environmental Protection Agency
- Mehdi Saeed Hazari, U.S. Environmental Protection Agency

==== National Aeronautics and Space Administration ====
- Morgan B. Abney, Marshall Space Flight Center
- Ian Gauld Clark, Jet Propulsion Laboratory and California Institute of Technology
- Temilola Fatoyinbo-Agueh, Goddard Space Flight Center
- Jessica E. Koehne, Ames Research Center
- Francis M. McCubbin, Institute of Meteoritics, University of New Mexico
- Yuri Y. Shprits, University of California, Los Angeles

==== National Science Foundation ====
21 awardees:

- Baratunde Aole Cola, Georgia Institute of Technology
- Brady R. Cox, University of Arkansas
- Meghan A. Duffy, Georgia Institute of Technology
- Joshua S. Figueroa, University of California, San Diego
- Michael J. Freedman, Princeton University
- Erin Marie Furtak, University of Colorado Boulder
- B. Scott Gaudi, The Ohio State University
- Curtis Huttenhower, Harvard University
- Christopher A. Mattson, Brigham Young University
- David C. Noone, University of Colorado Boulder
- Parag A. Pathak, Massachusetts Institute of Technology
- Alice Louise Pawley, Purdue University
- Amy Lucía Prieto, Colorado State University
- Mayly C. Sanchez, Iowa State University and Argonne National Laboratory
- Sridevi Vedula Sarma, Johns Hopkins University
- Suzanne M. Shontz, Pennsylvania State University
- Mariel Vázquez, San Francisco State University
- Luis von Ahn, Carnegie Mellon University
- Brent Waters, University of Texas at Austin
- Jennifer Wortman Vaughan, University of California, Los Angeles
- Salman A. Avestimehr, University of Southern California

=== 2012 ===
On December 23, 2013, President Obama presented 102 scientists with the award for 2012:

==== Department of Agriculture ====
- Steven Cannon, Iowa State University
- Isis Mullarky, Virginia Polytechnic Institute and State University
- Justin Runyon, U.S. Forest Service

==== Department of Commerce ====
- Gretchen Campbell, National Institute of Standards and Technology
- Adam Clark, University of Oklahoma / NOAA National Severe Storms Laboratory
- Alan Haynie, National Oceanic and Atmospheric Administration
- R. Joseph Kline, National Institute of Standards and Technology
- Ana Rey, National Institute of Standards and Technology and University of Colorado Boulder
- Scott Weaver, National Oceanic and Atmospheric Administration

==== Department of Defense ====
16 awardees:

- Jennifer Dionne, Stanford University
- Mohamed El-Naggar, University of Southern California
- Gregory Fuchs, Cornell University
- Kristen Grauman, University of Texas at Austin
- Mona Jarrahi, University of Michigan
- Lane Martin, University of Illinois Urbana-Champaign
- Yael Niv, Princeton University
- Derek Paley, University of Maryland
- Greg Pitz, Air Force Research Laboratory
- Ronald Polcawich, U.S. Army Research Laboratory
- Rodney Priestley, Princeton University
- Jeremy Robinson, Naval Research Laboratory
- Onome Scott-Emuakpor, Air Force Research Laboratory
- Ramon van Handel, Princeton University
- David Weld, University of California, Santa Barbara
- Yongjie Zhang, Carnegie Mellon University

==== Department of Education ====
- Jeffrey Karpicke, Purdue University (Note: Jeffrey Karpicke was nominated by both the Department of Education and the National Science Foundation)
- Young-Suk Kim, Florida State University

==== Department of Energy ====
13 awardees:

- Brian Anderson, West Virginia University
- Theodore Betley, Harvard University
- Matthew Brake, Sandia National Laboratories
- Adrian Chavez, Sandia National Laboratories
- Gary Douberly, University of Georgia
- Mattan Erez, University of Texas at Austin
- Sean Hartnoll, Stanford University
- Daniel Kasen, University of California, Berkeley and Lawrence Berkeley National Laboratory
- Meimei Li, Argonne National Laboratory
- Miguel Morales, Lawrence Livermore National Laboratory
- Jennifer Reed, University of Wisconsin–Madison
- Seth Root, Sandia National Laboratories
- Adam Weber, Lawrence Berkeley National Laboratory

==== Department of Health and Human Services ====
23 awardees, 20 nominated by the NIH and 3 by the CDC:

- Debra Auguste, City College of New York
- Jessica Belser, Centers for Disease Control and Prevention
- Jeremy Clark, University of Washington
- Andreea Creanga, Centers for Disease Control and Prevention
- Damien Fair, Oregon Health & Science University
- Thomas Fazzio, University of Massachusetts Medical School
- Jessica Gill, National Institutes of Health
- Andrew Goodman, Yale School of Medicine
- Aron Hall, Centers for Disease Control and Prevention
- Xue Han, Boston University
- Susan Harbison, National Institutes of Health
- Richard Ho, Vanderbilt University Medical Center
- Shingo Kajimura, University of California, San Francisco
- Young-Shin Kim, Yale School of Medicine
- Todd Macfarlan, National Institutes of Health
- Gaby Maimon, Rockefeller University
- Sandra McAllister, Harvard Medical School
- Quyen Nguyen, University of California, San Diego
- Sallie Permar, Duke University School of Medicine
- Katherine Radek, Loyola University Chicago
- Katherine Rauen, University of California, San Francisco
- Ida Spruill, Medical University of South Carolina
- Andrew Yoo, Washington University School of Medicine

==== Department of the Interior ====
- Anna Chalfoun, U.S. Geological Survey
- Gavin Hayes, U.S. Geological Survey
- Burke Minsley, U.S. Geological Survey

==== Department of Veterans Affairs ====
- Karunesh Ganguly, San Francisco VA Medical Center
- Brian Head, VA San Diego Healthcare System
- Katherine Iverson, VA Boston Healthcare System
- Hardeep Singh, Houston VA Medical Center

==== Environmental Protection Agency ====
- Steven Thomas Purucker, Environmental Protection Agency

==== Intelligence Community ====
- Joeanna Arthur, National Geospatial-Intelligence Agency
- Lucy Cohan, Central Intelligence Agency
- Justin Jacobs, National Security Agency
- Steven Jaslar, Federal Bureau of Investigation
- Daniel Stick, Sandia National Laboratories
- Charles Tahan, National Security Agency

==== National Aeronautics and Space Administration ====
- Joshua Alwood, NASA Ames Research Center
- Douglas Hoffmann, Jet Propulsion Laboratory and California Institute of Technology
- Randall McEntaffer, University of Iowa
- Tamlin Pavelsky, University of North Carolina at Chapel Hill
- Patrick Taylor, NASA Langley Research Center

==== National Science Foundation ====
19 awardees:

- Theodor Agapie, California Institute of Technology
- Javier Arce-Nazario, University of Puerto Rico at Cayey
- Sarah Bergbreiter, University of Maryland at College Park
- Moises Carreon, University of Louisville
- Sigrid Close, Stanford University
- Raffaella De Vita, Virginia Polytechnic Institute and State University
- Abigail Doyle, Princeton University
- Daniel Goldman, Georgia Institute of Technology
- Joel Griffitts, Brigham Young University
- Samantha Hansen, University of Alabama
- Rouslan Krechetnikov, University of California, Santa Barbara
- Tamara Moore, University of Minnesota
- Daniela Oliveira, Bowdoin College
- Jonathan Pillow, University of Texas at Austin
- Benjamin Recht, University of Wisconsin–Madison
- David Savitt, University of Arizona
- Noah Snavely, Cornell University
- Junqiao Wu, University of California, Berkeley
- Ahmet Yildiz, University of California, Berkeley

==== Smithsonian Institution ====
- Rossman Irwin III, National Air and Space Museum

=== 2013 ===
On February 18, 2016, President Obama presented 105 researchers with the award for 2013:

==== Department of Agriculture ====
- Renee Arias, National Peanut Research Laboratory
- Matthew Thompson, Rocky Mountain Research Station
- Kenong Xu, Cornell University

==== Department of Commerce ====
- Nathan Bacheler, National Oceanic and Atmospheric Administration
- Adam Creuziger, National Institute of Standards and Technology
- Gijs de Boer, National Oceanic and Atmospheric Administration and University of Colorado-Boulder
- Tara Lovestead, National Institute of Standards and Technology
- Andrew Ludlow, National Institute of Standards and Technology
- James Thorson, National Oceanic and Atmospheric Administration

==== Department of Defense ====
17 awardees:

- Pieter Abbeel, University of California-Berkeley
- Deji Akinwande, University of Texas-Austin
- Jin-Hee Cho, US Army Research Laboratory
- Sarah Cowie, University of Nevada-Reno
- Dino Di Carlo, University of California-Los Angeles
- Alon Gorodetsky, University of California-Irvine
- Elad Harel, Northwestern University
- Patrick Hopkins, University of Virginia
- Anya Jones, University of Maryland
- Colin Joye, Naval Research Laboratory
- Lena Kourkoutis, Cornell University
- Jennifer Miksis-Olds, Pennsylvania State University
- Timothy Ombrello, Air Force Research Laboratory
- Heather Pidcoke, US Army Institute of Surgical Research
- James Rondinelli, Drexel University
- Bozhi Tian, University of Chicago
- Luke Zettlemoyer, University of Washington

==== Department of Education ====
- Christopher Lemons, Peabody College of Vanderbilt University
- Cynthia Puranik, University of Pittsburgh

==== Department of Energy ====
13 awardees:

- Tonio Buonassisi, Massachusetts Institute of Technology
- Milind Kulkarni, Purdue University
- Keji Lai, University of Texas-Austin
- Paul Ohodnicki, Jr., National Energy Technology Laboratory
- Michelle O'Malley, University of California, Santa Barbara
- Matthias Schindler, University of South Carolina
- Jonathan Simon, University of Chicago
- Michael Stadler, Lawrence Berkeley National Laboratory
- Melissa Teague, Idaho National Laboratory
- William Tisdale, Massachusetts Institute of Technology
- Jonathan B. Hopkins, University of California, Los Angeles
- Tammy Ma, Lawrence Livermore National Laboratory
- David Mascareñas, Los Alamos National Laboratory

==== Department of Health and Human Services ====
23 awardees, 20 nominated by the NIH and 3 by the CDC:

- Hillel Adesnik, University of California, Berkeley
- Cheryl Broussard, Centers for Disease Control and Prevention
- Samantha Brugmann, Cincinnati Children's Hospital Medical Center
- Namandje Bumpus, Johns Hopkins University
- Jacob Carr, Centers for Disease Control and Prevention
- Kafui Dzirasa, Duke University
- Camilla Forsberg, University of California, Santa Cruz
- Tina Goldstein, University of Pittsburgh
- Viviana Gradinaru, California Institute of Technology
- Jordan Green, Johns Hopkins University
- Katie Kindt, National Institutes of Health
- Andre Larochelle, National Institutes of Health
- Jennifer Lorvick, RTI International
- Courtney Miller, The Scripps Research Institute
- Kiran Musunuru, Harvard University
- David Pagliarini, University of Wisconsin – Madison
- Sachin Patel, Vanderbilt University
- Amy Ralston, University of California Santa Cruz
- Carrie Reed, Centers for Disease Control and Prevention
- Ervin Sejdic, University of Pittsburgh
- Elizabeth Skidmore, University of Pittsburgh
- Kay Tye, Massachusetts Institute of Technology
- Muhammad Walji, The University of Texas School of Dentistry at Houston

==== Department of the Interior ====
- Richard Briggs, U.S. Geological Survey
- Jeffrey Pigati, U.S. Geological Survey
- Maureen Purcell, U.S. Geological Survey

==== Department of Veterans Affairs ====
- Paul Marasco, Louis Stokes Cleveland VA Medical Center
- Panagiotis Roussos, James J. Peters VA Medical Center
- Erika Wolf, VA Boston Healthcare System

==== Environmental Protection Agency ====
- Rebecca Dodder, EPA
- Alex Marten, EPA

==== Intelligence Community ====
- Kregg Arms, National Security Agency
- Nicole Bohannon, Central Intelligence Agency
- Ashley Holt, National Geospatial-Intelligence Agency
- Jon Kosloski, National Security Agency
- David Loveall, Federal Bureau of Investigation
- Whitney Nelson, National Geospatial-Intelligence Agency

==== National Aeronautics and Space Administration ====
- James Benardini, NASA Jet Propulsion Laboratory
- Jin-Woo Han, NASA Ames Research Center
- Michele Manuel, University of Florida
- Andrew Molthan, NASA Marshall Space Flight Center
- Colleen Mouw, Michigan Technological University
- Vikram Shyam, NASA Glenn Research Center

==== National Science Foundation ====
21 awardees:

- Adam Abate, University of California, San Francisco
- Marcel Agueros, Columbia University
- Arezoo Ardekani, University of Notre Dame
- Cullen Buie, Massachusetts Institute of Technology
- Erin Carlson, Indiana University
- Antonius Dieker, Georgia Tech Research Corporation
- Erika Edwards, Brown University
- Julia Grigsby, Boston College
- Todd Gureckis, New York University
- Tessa Hill, University of California - Davis
- Daniel Krashen, University of Georgia
- Rahul Mangharam, University of Pennsylvania
- David Masiello, University of Washington
- Daniel McCloskey, College of Staten Island, City University of New York
- Shwetak Patel, University of Washington
- Aaron Roth, University of Pennsylvania
- Sayeef Salahuddin, University of California, Berkeley
- Jakita Thomas, Spelman College
- Joachim Walther, University of Georgia
- Kristen Wendell, University of Massachusetts-Boston
- Benjamin Williams, University of California-Los Angeles

=== 2014 ===
On January 9, 2017, President Obama presented the 99 scientists with the award for 2014:

==== Department of Agriculture ====
- Michelle Cilia, USDA Agricultural Research Service
- Pankaj Lal, Montclair State University
- Michael Ulyshen, USDA Forest Service

==== Department of Commerce ====
- Nicholas Butch, NIST Center for Neutron Research
- Mandy Karnauskas, NOAA Fisheries
- Anne Perring, University of Colorado, Boulder
- Corey Potvin, University of Oklahoma
- John Teufel, NIST Physical Measurement Laboratory
- Justin Zook, NIST Material Measurement Laboratory

==== Department of Defense ====
16 awardees:

- Michael Bell, Colorado State University
- Nurcin Celik, University of Miami
- Kaushik Chowdhury, Northeastern University
- Shawn Douglas, University of California, San Francisco
- Christopher Dyer, DeepMind and Carnegie Mellon University
- Aaron Esser-Kahn, University of California, Irvine
- Sinan Keten, Northwestern University
- Jonathan Fan, Stanford University
- Danna Freedman, Northwestern University
- Thomas Harris, Northwestern University
- David Hsieh, California Institute of Technology
- Osama Nayfeh, Space and Naval Warfare Systems Center-Pacific
- Olukayode Okusaga, Johns Hopkins Applied Physics Laboratory
- Joseph Parker, U.S. Naval Research Laboratory
- Adam Pilchak, Air Force Research Laboratory
- Harris Wang, Columbia University

==== Department of Education ====
- Daphna Bassok, University of Virginia
- Shayne Piasta, The Ohio State University

==== Department of Energy ====
13 awardees:

- Jonathan Belof, Lawrence Livermore National Laboratory
- Carl Dahl, Northwestern University
- Eric Duoss, Lawrence Livermore National Laboratory
- Anna Grassellino, Fermi National Accelerator Laboratory
- Jacqueline Hakala, National Energy Technology Laboratory
- Stephanie Hansen, Sandia National Laboratories
- Kory Hedman, Arizona State University
- Alan Kruizenga, Sandia National Laboratories
- Wei Li, Rice University
- Guglielmo Scovazzi, Duke University
- Michael Tonks, Penn State University
- Jenny Yang, University of California, Irvine
- John Yeager, Los Alamos National Laboratory

==== Department of Health and Human Services ====
23 awardees, 20 nominated by the NIH and 3 by the CDC:

- Gregory Alushin, Rockefeller University
- Manish Arora, Icahn School of Medicine at Mount Sinai
- Dawn Cornelison, University of Missouri
- Kashmira Date, Centers for Disease Control and Prevention
- Craig Duvall, Vanderbilt University
- Nicholas Gilpin, Louisiana State University Health Sciences Center
- Anna Greka, Brigham and Women's Hospital
- Pamela Guerrerio, National Institutes of Health
- Gery Guy, Jr., Centers for Disease Control and Prevention
- Christine Hendon, Columbia University
- Catherine Karr, University of Washington
- Maria Lehtinen, Boston Children's Hospital
- Adriana Lleras-Muney, University of California, Los Angeles
- Mary Kay Lobo, University of Maryland School of Medicine
- Michael McAlpine, University of Minnesota
- Eric Morrow, Brown University
- Daniel O'Connor, Johns Hopkins University
- Aimee Shen, Tufts University
- Cui Tao, University of Texas
- Jacquelyn Taylor, Yale School of Nursing
- Benjamin Voight, University of Pennsylvania
- Matthew Wheeler, Centers for Disease Control and Prevention
- Blake Wiedenheft, Montana State University

==== Department of the Interior ====
- Nathaniel Hitt, U.S. Geological Survey
- Sarah Minson, U.S. Geological Survey
- Diann Prosser, U.S. Geological Survey

==== Department of Veterans Affairs ====
- Adam Rose, RAND Corporation and Boston Medical Center
- Nasia Safdar, Middleton Memorial Veterans Hospital
- Joshua Yarrow, U.S. Department of Veterans Affairs

==== Environmental Protection Agency ====
- Havala Pye, Environmental Protection Agency
- Sala Senkayi, Environmental Protection Agency

==== Intelligence Community ====
- Matthew Dicken, U.S. Army
- Josiah Dykstra, National Security Agency
- James Kang, National Geospatial-Intelligence Agency
- Jason Matheny, Office of the Director of National Intelligence
- David Moehring, IonQ, Inc.
- R. Jacob Vogelstein, Intelligence Advanced Research Projects Activity

==== National Aeronautics and Space Administration ====
- Jeremy Bassis, University of Michigan
- Othmane Benafan, NASA Glenn Research Center
- Dalia Kirschbaum, NASA Goddard Space Flight Center
- Marco Pavone, Stanford University
- Miguel Roman, NASA Goddard Space Flight Center

==== National Science Foundation ====
19 awardees:

- Alicia Alonzo, Michigan State University
- Randy Ewoldt, University of Illinois Urbana-Champaign
- Emily Fox, University of Washington
- Jacob Fox, Stanford University
- Eric Hudson, University of California, Los Angeles
- Shawn Jordan, Arizona State University
- Ahmad Khalil, Boston University
- Oleg Komogortsev, Texas State University, San Marcos
- John Kovac, Harvard University
- Bérénice Mettler, University of Minnesota and icuemotion, LLC
- Jelani Nelson, Harvard University
- Elizabeth Nolan, Massachusetts Institute of Technology
- Michael Rotkowitz, University of Maryland, College Park
- Andrea Sweigart, University of Georgia
- Chuanbing Tang, University of South Carolina
- Aradhna Tripati, University of California, Los Angeles
- Franck Vernerey, University of Colorado, Boulder
- Juan Pablo Vielma Centeno, Massachusetts Institute of Technology
- Makeba Wilbourn, Duke University

==== Smithsonian Institution ====
- Nicholas Pyenson, Smithsonian Institution

=== 2016 ===
In February 2016, President Obama today named 105** researchers as recipients of the Presidential Early Career Awards for Scientists and Engineers, the highest honor bestowed by the United States Government on science and engineering professionals in the early stages of their independent research careers.

The recipients for 2016 were*:

==== Department of Agriculture ====
- Renee Arias, National Peanut Research Laboratory
- Matthew Thompson, Rocky Mountain Research Station
- Kenong Xu, Cornell University

==== Department of Commerce ====
- Nathan Bacheler, National Oceanic and Atmospheric Administration
- Adam Creuziger, National Institute of Standards and Technology
- Gijs de Boer, National Oceanic and Atmospheric Administration and University of Colorado-Boulder
- Tara Lovestead, National Institute of Standards and Technology
- Andrew Ludlow, National Institute of Standards and Technology
- James Thorson, National Oceanic and Atmospheric Administration

==== Department of Defense ====
- Pieter Abbeel, University of California, Berkeley
- Deji Akinwande, University of Texas at Austin
- Jin-Hee Cho, US Army Research Laboratory
- Sarah Cowie, University of Nevada-Reno
- Dino Di Carlo, University of California, Los Angeles
- Alon Gorodetsky, University of California, Irvine
- Elad Harel, Northwestern University
- Patrick Hopkins, University of Virginia
- Anya Jones, University of Maryland
- Colin Joye, Naval Research Laboratory
- Lena Kourkoutis, Cornell University
- Jennifer Miksis-Olds, Pennsylvania State University
- Timothy Ombrello, Air Force Research Laboratory
- Heather Pidcoke, US Army Institute of Surgical Research
- James Rondinelli, Drexel University
- Bozhi Tian, University of Chicago
- Luke Zettlemoyer, University of Washington

==== Department of Education ====
- Christopher Lemons, Vanderbilt Peabody College of Education and Human Development
- Cynthia Puranik, University of Pittsburgh

==== Department of Energy ====
- Tonio Buonassisi, Massachusetts Institute of Technology
- Milind Kulkarni, Purdue University
- Keji Lai, University of Texas-Austin
- Paul Ohodnicki, Jr., National Energy Technology Laboratory
- Michelle O'Malley, University of California, Santa Barbara
- Matthias Schindler, University of South Carolina
- Jonathan Simon, University of Chicago
- Michael Stadler, Lawrence Berkeley National Laboratory
- Melissa Teague, Idaho National Laboratory
- William Tisdale, Massachusetts Institute of Technology
- Jonathan Hopkins, University of California, Los Angeles
- Tammy Ma, Lawrence Livermore National Laboratory
- David Mascareñas, Los Alamos National Laboratory

==== Department of Health and Human Services ====
- Hillel Adesnik, University of California, Berkeley
- Cheryl Broussard, Centers for Disease Control and Prevention
- Samantha Brugmann, Cincinnati Children's Hospital Medical Center
- Namandje Bumpus, Johns Hopkins University
- Jacob Carr, Centers for Disease Control and Prevention
- Kafui Dzirasa, Duke University
- Camilla Forsberg, University of California, Santa Cruz
- Tina Goldstein, University of Pittsburgh
- Viviana Gradinaru, California Institute of Technology
- Jordan Green, Johns Hopkins University
- Katie Kindt, National Institutes of Health
- Andre Larochelle, National Institutes of Health
- Jennifer Lorvick, RTI International
- Courtney Miller, The Scripps Research Institute
- Kiran Musunuru, Harvard University
- David Pagliarini, University of Wisconsin – Madison
- Sachin Patel, Vanderbilt University
- Amy Ralston, University of California, Santa Cruz
- Carrie Reed, Centers for Disease Control and Prevention
- Ervin Sejdic, University of Pittsburgh
- Elizabeth Skidmore, University of Pittsburgh
- Kay Tye, Massachusetts Institute of Technology
- Muhammad Walji, The University of Texas School of Dentistry at Houston

==== Department of Interior ====
- Richard Briggs, U.S. Geological Survey
- Jeffrey Pigati, U.S. Geological Survey
- Maureen Purcell, U.S. Geological Survey

==== Department of Veterans Affairs ====
- Paul Marasco, Louis Stokes Cleveland VA Medical Center
- Panagiotis Roussos, James J. Peters VA Medical Center
- Erika Wolf, VA Boston Healthcare System

==== Environmental Protection Agency ====
- Rebecca Dodder, EPA
- Alex Marten, EPA

==== Intelligence Community ====
- Kregg Arms, National Security Agency
- Nicole Bohannon, Central Intelligence Agency
- Ashley Holt, National Geospatial-Intelligence Agency
- Jon Kosloski, National Security Agency
- David Loveall, Federal Bureau of Investigation
- Whitney Nelson, National Geospatial-Intelligence Agency

==== National Aeronautics and Space Administration ====
- James Benardini, NASA Jet Propulsion Laboratory
- Jin-Woo Han, NASA Ames Research Center
- Michele Manuel, University of Florida
- Andrew Molthan, NASA Marshall Space Flight Center
- Colleen Mouw, Michigan Technological University
- Vikram Shyam, NASA Glenn Research Center

==== National Science Foundation ====
- Adam Abate, University of California, San Francisco
- Marcel Agueros, Columbia University
- Arezoo Ardekani, University of Notre Dame
- Cullen Buie, Massachusetts Institute of Technology
- Erin Carlson, Indiana University
- Antonius Dieker, Georgia Tech Research Corporation
- Erika Edwards, Brown University
- Julia Grigsby, Boston College
- Todd Gureckis, New York University
- Tessa Hill, University of California, Davis
- Daniel Krashen, University of Georgia
- Rahul Mangharam, University of Pennsylvania
- David Masiello, University of Washington
- Daniel McCloskey, College of Staten Island
- Shwetak Patel, University of Washington
- Aaron Roth, University of Pennsylvania
- Sayeef Salahuddin, University of California, Berkeley
- Jakita Thomas, Spelman College
- Joachim Walther, University of Georgia
- Kristen Wendell, University of Massachusetts-Boston
- Benjamin Williams, University of California-Los Angeles

=== 2017 ===
On July 2, 2019, President Trump announced 315 recipients of the award, for the 2017 class:

==== Department of Agriculture ====
- Sean Parks, Rocky Mountain Research Station
- Heather K. Allen, National Animal Disease Center
- Jo Anne Crouch, Systematic Mycology and Microbiology Laboratory
- Jennifer Kao-Kniffin, Cornell University
- Sara Lupton, Red River Valley Agricultural Research Center
- David Bell, Pacific Northwest Research Station
- Megan O'Rourke, Virginia Polytechnic Institute and State University

==== Department of Commerce ====
18 awardees:

- Elizabeth Siddon, National Oceanic and Atmospheric Administration National Marine Fisheries Service, Alaska Fisheries Science Center
- Andrew Hoell, National Oceanic and Atmospheric Administration Office of Oceanic and Atmospheric Research Earth System Research Laboratory
- Brian McDonald, Cooperative Institute for Research in Environmental Sciences
- Andrew Rollins, University of Colorado – Cooperative Institute for Research in Environmental Science
- Melissa Soldevilla, National Oceanic and Atmospheric Administration Fisheries Southeast Fisheries Science Center
- Michelle Barbieri, Pacific Islands Fisheries Science Center
- Edwin Chan, National Institute of Standards and Technology Material Measurement Laboratory
- Alexey Gorshkov, National Institute of Standards and Technology Physical Measurement Laboratory
- Behrang Hamadani, National Institute of Standards and Technology Engineering Laboratory
- Stephen Jordan, National Institute of Standards and Technology Information Technology Laboratory
- Kathryn Keenan, National Institute of Standards and Technology Physical Measurement Laboratory
- David Long, National Institute of Standards and Technology Material Measurement Laboratory
- Elijah Petersen, National Institute of Standards and Technology Material Measurement Laboratory
- Franklyn Quinlan, National Institute of Standards and Technology Physical Measurement Laboratory
- Laura Sinclair, National Institute of Standards and Technology Physical Measurement Laboratory
- Varun Verma, National Institute of Standards and Technology Physical Measurement Laboratory
- Eric Anderson, National Oceanic and Atmospheric Administration Great Lakes Environmental Research Laboratory
- Jeffrey Snyder, Cooperative Institute for Mesoscale Meteorology

==== Department of Defense ====
47 awardees, including 12 nominated by the Army Research Office (ARO) and 12 nominated by the Office of Naval Research (ONR): (to-do: further organize)

- Martin Heimbeck, Army Materiel Command, Research Development and Engineering Command, Aviation and Missile Research Development and Engineering Command
- Hugh Churchill, University of Arkansas
- Nathaniel Gabor, University of California – Riverside
- Monika Schleier-Smith, Stanford University
- Andrea Young, University of California – Santa Barbara
- Timothy Berkelbach, University of Chicago
- Pinshane Huang, University of Illinois – Urbana-Champaign
- Nathan Lazarus, U.S. Army Research Laboratory
- Ashley Ruth, U.S. Army Communications-Electronics Research, Development and Engineering Center
- Yogesh Surendranath, Massachusetts Institute of Technology
- Bharat Jalan, University of Minnesota – Twin Cities
- William Heard, United States Army Corps of Engineers Engineer Research and Development Center
- James Hing, Naval Air Warfare Center Aircraft Division
- James LeBeau, North Carolina State University
- Reginald Cooper, Air Force Research Laboratory Sensors Directorate
- Daniel Garmann, Air Force Research Laboratory
- Griffin Romigh, Air Force Research Lab 711th HPW/RHCB
- Kin Fai Mak, Pennsylvania State University
- Robert Hernandez, Naval Undersea Warfare Center Division – Newport
- Jiun-Haw Chu, University of Washington
- Brandon Cochenour, Naval Air Warfare Center Aircraft Division
- Adam Dunkelberger, U.S. Naval Research Laboratory
- Volker Sorger, George Washington University

===== Army Research Office (ARO) =====
12 awardees, 4 per year:

====== ARO (2015) ======
- Dhruv Batra, Georgia Institute of Technology
- Joseph Checkelsky, Massachusetts Institute of Technology
- Phillip Christopher, University of California – Riverside
- Jinglin Fu, Rutgers University – Camden

====== ARO (2016) ======
- Steven Brunton, University of Washington
- Domenic Forte, University of Florida
- Jeff Thompson, Princeton University
- Katharine Tibbetts, Virginia Commonwealth University

====== ARO (2017) ======
- Percy Liang, Stanford University
- Jenny Suckale, Stanford University
- Gordon Wetzstein, Stanford University
- Yuji Zhao, Arizona State University

===== Office of Naval Research =====
12 awardees:

- Gaurav Bahl, University of Illinois – Urbana-Champaign
- Yuejie Chi, Carnegie Mellon University
- Blair Johnson, University at Buffalo
- Javad Lavaei, University of California – Berkeley
- Benedetto Marelli, Massachusetts Institute of Technology
- Matthew McDowell, Georgia Institute of Technology
- Austin Minnich, California Institute of Technology
- Piya Pal, University of California – San Diego
- Padmini Rangamani, University of California – San Diego
- Anita Shukla, Brown University
- Conor Walsh, Harvard University
- Roseanna Zia, Cornell University

==== Department of Education ====
- Karen Thompson, Oregon State University
- Suzanne Adlof, University of South Carolina
- Sarah Powell, University of Texas – Austin
- Candace Walkington, Southern Methodist University
- Tricia Zucker, University of Texas Medical School – Houston
- Benjamin Castleman, University of Virginia

==== Department of Energy ====
39 awardees:

- Félicie Albert, Lawrence Livermore National Laboratory
- Daniel Casey, Lawrence Livermore National Laboratory
- Jim Ciston, Lawrence Berkeley National Laboratory
- Jacklyn Gates, Lawrence Berkeley National Laboratory
- Richard Kraus, Lawrence Livermore National Laboratory
- Shiwoo Lee, National Energy Technology Laboratory
- Lin Lin, University of California – Berkeley
- Arthur Pak, Lawrence Livermore National Laboratory
- Timothy Silverman, National Renewable Energy Laboratory
- Michael Wagner, National Renewable Energy Laboratory
- Stephanie Law, University of Delaware – Newark
- Vivek Agarwal, Idaho National Laboratory
- Krzysztof Gofryk, Idaho National Laboratory
- Christopher Zarzana, Idaho National Laboratory
- Matthew Dietrich, Argonne National Laboratory
- Henry Hoffmann, University of Chicago
- Julia Shelton, University of Illinois – Urbana-Champaign
- Rebecca Schulman, Johns Hopkins University
- Yen-Jie Lee, Massachusetts Institute of Technology
- Tracy Slatyer, Massachusetts Institute of Technology
- Erik Grumstrup, Montana State University
- Marylesa Howard, Nevada National Security Site
- Salvatore Campione, Sandia National Laboratories
- Matthew Gomez, Sandia National Laboratories
- Abigail Hunter, Los Alamos National Laboratory
- Shea Mosby, Los Alamos National Laboratory
- Paul Schmit, Sandia National Laboratories
- Irina Tezaur, Sandia National Laboratories
- Thomas Hartman, Cornell University
- Kelly Wrighton, Ohio State University – Columbus
- Douglas Kauffman, National Energy Technology Laboratory
- Jordan Musser, National Energy Technology Laboratory
- David Cullen, Oak Ridge National Laboratory
- Katharine Page, Oak Ridge National Laboratory
- Justin Stevens, College of William and Mary
- Alvin Cheung, University of Washington
- Kevin Schneider, Pacific Northwest National Laboratory
- Jonathan Engle, University of Wisconsin – Madison
- Victor Zavala, University of Wisconsin – Madison

==== Department of Health and Human Services ====
67 awardees, 60 nominated through the NIH and 7 nominated through the CDC:

- Eiman Azim, Salk Institute for Biological Studies
- Sanjay Basu, Stanford University
- Scott Boyd, Stanford University School of Medicine
- Adriana Galván, University of California – Los Angeles
- Shafali Jeste, University of California – Los Angeles
- Zachary Knight, University of California – San Francisco School of Medicine
- Darren Lipomi, University of California – San Diego
- Michelle Monje, Stanford University
- James Olzmann, University of California – Berkeley
- Carolyn I. Rodriguez, Stanford University
- Wenjun Zhang, University of California – Berkeley
- Elena Gracheva, Yale University School of Medicine
- Anne Marie France, Centers for Disease Control and Prevention
- Emily Haas, Centers for Disease Control and Prevention
- Matthew Maenner, Centers for Disease Control and Prevention
- Lucy McNamara, National Center for Infectious Diseases
- Subbian Panayampalli, National Center for Emerging and Zoonotic Infectious Diseases
- Oduyebo Titilope, National Center for Chronic Disease Prevention and Health Promotion
- Binnian Wei, Centers for Disease Control and Prevention
- Lana Garmire, University of Hawaii at Manoa
- Daniel Llano, University of Illinois – Urbana-Champaign
- Joel Voss, Northwestern University
- Jeremy Greenlee, University of Iowa
- John Brognard, National Institutes of Health
- Darrell Gaskin, Johns Hopkins University
- Donna Gogerdchi, University of Maryland School of Medicine
- Silvana Goldszmid, National Institutes of Health
- Christopher Hourigan, National Institutes of Health
- Katherine McJunkin, National Institutes of Health
- Adam Phillippy, National Institutes of Health
- Anish Thomas, National Institutes of Health
- Catherine Weisz, National Institutes of Health
- Kwanghun Chung, Massachusetts Institute of Technology
- Sarah Collins, Brigham and Women's Hospital
- Felipe Fregni, Harvard Medical School
- Eric Greer, Harvard Medical School
- John Harris, University of Massachusetts Medical School
- Amy Janes, Harvard Medical School
- Steve Ramirez, Harvard University
- Conor Walsh, Harvard Medical School
- Jessica Whited, Harvard Medical School
- Joanne Kahlenberg, University of Michigan Medical School
- Colter Mitchell, University of Michigan
- Moriah Thomason, Wayne State University
- Melena Bellin, University of Minnesota
- Angela Pannier, University of Nebraska – Lincoln
- Jennifer Gillette, University of New Mexico Health Sciences Center
- Sandeep Mallipattu, Stony Brook School of Medicine
- Ian Maze, Icahn School of Medicine at Mount Sinai
- Priya Rajasethupathy, Rockefeller University
- Neville Sanjana, New York Genome Center
- Jason Sheltzer, Cold Spring Harbor Laboratory
- Ron Alterovitz, University of North Carolina at Chapel Hill – Chapel Hill
- Michael Boyce, Duke University School of Medicine
- Chandra Jackson, National Institutes of Health
- Jennifer Martinez, National Institutes of Health
- Spencer Smith, University of North Carolina at Chapel Hill – Chapel Hill
- Tracey Yap, Duke University
- Sohini Ramachandran, Brown University
- Meenakshi Madhur, Vanderbilt University
- Namkee Choi, University of Texas – Austin
- Katherine King, Baylor College of Medicine
- David Zhang, Rice University
- Kory Lavine, Washington University School of Medicine
- Sara Lindstroem, University of Washington
- Elizabeth Nance, University of Washington
- Xudong Wang, University of Wisconsin – Madison

==== Department of the Interior ====
- Annemarie Baltay, Earthquake Science Center
- Aaron Wech, Volcano Science Center
- Heather Wright, Volcano Science Center
- Brian Ebel, National Research Program
- Celestine Mercer, Central Mineral and Environmental Resources Science Center
- Patricia Dalyander, St. Petersburg Coastal and Marine Science Center
- Nedal Nassar, National Minerals Information Center
- Jeffrey Lorch, National Wildlife Health Center

==== Department of Veterans Affairs ====
- Eric Chang, San Diego VA Healthcare System
- David Clark, Malcom Randall VA Medical Center
- Jason Wertheim, Jesse Brown VA Medical Center
- Walid Gellad, VA Pittsburgh Healthcare System

==== Environmental Protection Agency ====
- Carlie LaLone, Environmental Protection Agency
- Jon Sobus, Environmental Protection Agency

==== Intelligence Community ====
17 awardees:

- Rodney Blakestad, Intelligence Advanced Research Projects Activity
- Christopher Boehnen, Intelligence Advanced Research Projects Activity
- Sean Carrick, National Security Agency
- Kristin DeWitt, Intelligence Advanced Research Projects Activity
- Candice Gerstner, National Security Agency
- Seth Goldstein, Intelligence Advanced Research Projects Activity
- Alexis Jeannotte, Intelligence Advanced Research Projects Activity
- Jonas Kibelbek, National Security Agency
- David Markowitz, Intelligence Advanced Research Projects Activity
- Katelyn Meixner, National Security Agency
- Sean Weaver, National Security Agency
- Timothy Burchfield, University of Texas – Dallas
- Elizabeth Bernstein, National Geospatial-Intelligence Agency
- Hak Jae Kim, National Geospatial-Intelligence Agency
- Matthew Klaric, National Geospatial-Intelligence Agency
- Frances Lacagnina, National Geospatial-Intelligence Agency
- Alexis Truitt, National Geospatial-Intelligence Agency

==== National Aeronautics and Space Administration ====
18 awardees:

- Jennifer Barrila, Arizona State University
- Lynn Carter, University of Arizona
- Laura Barge, National Aeronautics and Space Administration Jet Propulsion Laboratory
- Erika Hamden, California Institute of Technology
- John Reager, National Aeronautics and Space Administration Jet Propulsion Laboratory
- Jonathan Sauder, National Aeronautics and Space Administration Jet Propulsion Laboratory
- David Smith, National Aeronautics and Space Administration Ames Research Center
- Gioia Massa, Kennedy Space Center
- Kelly Stephani, University of Illinois – Urbana-Champaign
- Abigail Vieregg, University of Chicago
- Rebecca Kramer, Purdue University
- Giada Arney, Goddard Space Flight Center
- Shawn Domagal-Goldman, Goddard Space Flight Center
- Jennifer Stern, Goddard Space Flight Center
- Evan Pineda, National Aeronautics and Space Administration Glenn Research Center
- Mark Blenner, Clemson University
- Richard Moore, Langley Research Center
- Yolanda Shea, Langley Research Center

==== National Science Foundation ====
In 2015–2017, the NSF had the following 80 awardees.

===== NSF (2015) =====
26 awardees:

- Christine Aidala, University of Michigan – Ann Arbor
- Luis Campos, Columbia University
- Nicolas Cassar, Duke University
- Lynette Cegelski, Stanford University
- Mark Davenport, Georgia Institute of Technology
- Cory Dean, Columbia University
- Amanda Hummon, University of Notre Dame
- Todd Humphreys, University of Texas – Austin
- Prashant Jain, University of Illinois – Urbana-Champaign
- Christopher Jewell, University of Maryland – College Park
- Paula Lemons, University of Georgia
- Qiang Lin, University of Rochester
- Han Liu, Princeton University
- Erika Marin-Spiotta, University of Wisconsin
- Karolina Mukhtar, University of Alabama – Birmingham
- Mary Murphy, Indiana University
- Kristin Myers, Columbia University
- Aaron Parsons, University of California – Berkeley
- Cara Stepp, Boston University
- Mary-Louise Timmermans, Yale University
- Linwei Wang, Rochester Institute of Technology
- Jessica Ware, Rutgers University – Newark
- Tak-Sing Wong, Pennsylvania State University
- Roseanna Zia, Cornell University
- Saman Zonouz, Rutgers University

===== NSF (2016) =====
27 awardees:

- Whitney Behr, University of Texas – Austin
- Lorena Bociu, North Carolina State University
- Jennifer Carter, Case Western Reserve University
- Jeff Clune, University of Wyoming
- Philip Feng, Case Western Reserve University
- Danna Freedman, Northwestern University
- Aysegul Gunduz, University of Florida
- James Howison, University of Texas – Austin
- Tara Hudiburg, University of Idaho
- Nitya Kallivayalil, University of Virginia
- Chunlei Liang, George Washington University
- Percy Liang, Stanford University
- Christian Linder, Stanford University
- Po-Shen Loh, Carnegie-Mellon University
- Thomas Maimone, University of California – Berkeley
- John McCutcheon, University of Montana
- Erinn Muller, Mote Marine Laboratory and Aquarium
- Edward O'Brien, Pennsylvania State University
- Christina Payne, University of Kentucky Research Foundation
- Mar Reguant, Northwestern University
- Alejandro Rodriguez, Princeton University
- Marilyne Stains, University of Nebraska – Lincoln
- Eric Toberer, Colorado School of Mines
- Thomas Vidick, California Institute of Technology
- Megan Wawro, Virginia Polytechnic Institute & State University
- Jamil Zaki, Stanford University
- Xia Zhou, Dartmouth College

===== NSF (2017) =====
27 awardees:

- Amir Ali Ahmadi, Princeton University
- Marie Coppola, University of Connecticut
- Anca Dragan, University of California – Berkeley
- Nathaniel Hendren, Harvard University
- Hsiao-Ying Shadow Huang, North Carolina State University
- Christopher Jett, University of West Georgia
- Matthew Kirwan, College of William and Mary Virginia Institute of Marine Science
- Joanna Kiryluk, Stony Brook University
- Heather Knutson, California Institute of Technology
- Suveen Mathaudhu, University of California – Riverside
- Arvind Narayanan, Princeton University
- Maitane Olabarrieta, University of Florida
- Lillian Pierce, Duke University
- Laura Prugh, University of Washington
- Barna Saha, University of Massachusetts – Amherst
- Dominik Schillinger, University of Minnesota
- Corinna Schindler, University of Michigan
- Alexandre Shvartsburg, Wichita State University
- Rebecca Slayton, Cornell University
- Megan Thielges, Indiana University – Bloomington
- Seth Ariel Tongay, Arizona State University
- Idalis Villanueva, Utah State University
- Matthew Walsh, University of Texas – Arlington
- Christopher Wright, Drexel University
- Fengnian Xia, Yale University
- Chuan Xue, Ohio State University
- Matei Zaharia, Stanford University
- Pinar Zorlutuna, University of Notre Dame

==== Smithsonian Institution ====
- Kristina Teixeira, Smithsonian Institution

=== 2018 ===
==== Department of Defense ====
===== Army Research Office =====
4 awardees:

- Jerome Fox, University of Colorado – Boulder
- Ehsan Hoque, University of Rochester
- Lauren Zarzar, Pennsylvania State University
- Bo Zhen, University of Pennsylvania

=== 2021 ===
==== Department of Defense ====
===== Army Research Office =====
4 awardees:

- Mohit Bansal, University of North Carolina at Chapel Hill – Chapel Hill
- Arthur Prindle, Northwestern University
- Han Wang, University of Southern California
- Norman Yao, University of California – Berkeley

=== 2025 ===
==== Air Force Office of Scientific Research ====
5 awardees:

- Tingyi Gu
- Nathaniel Kinsey
- Robert Macfarlane
- Nick Parziale
- Justin Wilkerson

==== Army Research Office ====
6 awardees:

- Mohit Bansal
- Jerome Fox
- M. Ehsan Hoque
- Norman Yao
- Lauren Zarzar
- Bo Zhen

==== Department of Defense ====
40 awardees:

- Brian Bojko
- Christena Cadieux, US Army Medical Research Institute of Chemical Defense (USAMRICD)
- Joseph Cannon
- Rachel Carter
- Matthew Casto
- Kevin Cox
- Soheil Feizi
- Daniel Gillaugh
- Ashutosh Giri
- Nicholas Glavin
- Ari Goodman
- Grace Gu
- David Illig, Naval Air Warfare Center Aircraft Division
- Shelton H. Jacinto
- Ryan Johnson
- Jeffrey T. Lloyd
- Brittany Lynn
- Jesus Mares
- Bryan McCranor, US Army Medical Research Institute of Chemical Defense (USAMRICD)
- Sophia Merrifield
- Andrew Metcalf
- Sina Najmaei
- Mahesh Neupane
- Zachariah Page
- Mary Parker
- Casey Pirnstill
- Ritu Raman
- Keersten Ricks
- Lisa Rueschhoff
- Dorsa Sadigh
- Leslie Schoop
- Ashwin Shahani
- Isaac Sledge
- Alison Smith
- Ngwe Thawdar
- Benjamin Trump, US Army Engineer Research and Development Center (USACE-ERDC)
- Preston Webster
- Marissa Weichman
- Qi (Rose) Yu
- Liuyan Zhao

==== Department of Energy ====
- Oluwatomi (Tomi) Akindele
- Ahmad Al Rashdan
- Daniel Amador-Noguez
- Kavin Ammigan
- William Balliet
- Jennifer Bauer
- Peter Bosler
- Raul Briceno
- Susannah Burrows
- Holly Carlton
- Katerina Chatziioannou
- Juan-Pablo Correa-Baena
- Melissa Cregger
- Zohreh Davoudi
- Christine Duval
- Joanne Emerson
- Netta Engelhardt
- Nathaniel Ferraro
- Kevin Field
- Laura Fields
- Arianna Gleason
- Rajamani Gounder
- Emily Graham
- Amber Guckes
- Kelli Humbird
- Katherine Isaacs
- Andrew Jayich
- Andrea Jokisaari
- Vedika Khemani
- Ahmet Kusoglu
- Katya Le Blanc
- Aeriel Leonard
- James Letts
- Alexander Lindsay
- Amy Lovell
- Cara (Carolyn) Lubner
- Joseph Lukens
- Xiao Luo
- Gary Moore
- Diana Qiu
- Ruben Rellan-Alvarez
- Daniel Ruiz
- Lorenzo Sironi
- Douglas Stanford
- James Stegen
- Cheng Sun
- Nhan Tran
- Petros Tzeferacos
- Bjorn Vaagensmith
- Gwendolyn Voskuilen
- Bei Wang Phillips
- Stefan Wild
- Christina Wildfire
- Caroline Winters
- Ryan Wollaeger

==== Department of Transportation ====
- Rafic Helou
- Laura Mero
- Brett Torrence

==== Department of Education ====
- Elizabeth Bettini
- Eunsoo Cho
- Shaun Dougherty
- Kristin Gagnier
- Maithilee Kunda
- Allison Master
- Melanie Pellecchia
- Jenny Root
- Elizabeth Setren
- Elizabeth Tighe

==== Environmental Protection Agency ====
- Andrea Clements
- Kate Mulvaney
- Katherine Ratliff
- Anne Weaver

==== National Institutes of Health ====
- Benedict Anchang
- Brooke Ann Slavens
- Jessica Ancker
- Kavita Arora
- Ambika Bajpayee
- Azeez Butali
- Diego Bohorquez
- Jayeeta Basu
- Lauren Brinkley-Rubinstein
- Marni Boppart
- Matthew Bush
- Paloma Beamer
- Sylvester Black
- Donald Chi
- Erin Calipari
- Luke Chang
- You Chen
- Paul DeCaen
- Anthony Fehr
- Alexander Gusev
- Kymberly Gowdy
- Xiaosi Gu
- Ayana Jordan
- Sadhana Jackson
- Steven Josefowicz
- Ekta Khurana
- Kristine Kuhn
- Roselinde Kaiser
- Samira Kiani
- Yogendra Kanthi
- Elizabeth Leslie
- Antonina Mitrofanova
- Catherine McDonald
- Catherine Musselman
- Elizabeth Mayeda
- Shahin Nasr
- Ijeoma Opara
- Kassandra Ori-McKenney
- Justin Parent
- Kristen Pleil
- Mercedes Paredes
- Kanaka Rajan
- William Renninger
- Azizi Seixas
- Diane Santa Maria
- Jesse Schank
- Lindsay Schwarz
- Nirali Shah
- Sonja W. Scholz
- Andy Tan
- Anne Takesian
- Casey Taylor
- Hugo Tejeda
- Jacqueline Torres
- Dionna Williams
- Marc Wein
- Zeba Wunderlich
- Steven Yeh

==== Centers for Disease Control and Prevention ====
- Matthew Biggerstaff
- Rachel Burke
- Sascha Ellington
- Leora Feldstein
- Lee Greenawald
- Rebecca Guerin
- Holly Hughes
- Justin Lee
- Ruth Link-Gelles
- Robert McClung
- Samuel Shepard
- Mark Tenforde
- Zachary Weiner
- Kate Russell Woodworth
- Kun Zhang
- Marissa Zwald

==== Intelligence Community ====
- John Beieler
- Karen Grutter
- David Isaacson
- Andrew Medak

==== National Aeronautics and Space Administration ====
19 awardees:

- Natasha Batalha, NASA Ames Research Center, Silicon Valley, California — for transformational scientific research in the development of open-source systems for the modeling of exoplanet atmospheres and observations.
- Elizabeth Blaber, Rensselaer Polytechnic Institute, Troy, New York — for transformative spaceflight and ground-based space biology research.
- James Burns, University of Virginia, Charlottesville — for innovative research at the intersection of metallurgy, solid mechanics and chemistry.
- Egle Cekanaviciute, NASA Ames Research Center — for producing transformational research to enable long-duration human exploration on the Moon and Mars.
- Nacer Chahat, NASA Jet Propulsion Laboratory, Southern California — for leading the innovation of spacecraft antennas that enable NASA deep space and earth science missions.
- Ellyn Enderlin, Boise State University, Idaho — for innovative methods to study glaciers using a wide variety of satellite datasets.
- David Estrada, Boise State University, Idaho — for innovative research in the areas of printed electronics for in space manufacturing and sensors for harsh environments.
- Burcu Gurkan, Case Western Reserve University, Cleveland, Ohio — for transforming contemporary approaches to energy storage and carbon capture to be safer and more economical, for applications in space and on Earth.
- Elliott Hawkes, University of California, Santa Barbara — for highly creative innovations in bio-inspired robotics that advance science and support NASA's mission.
- John Hwang, University of California, San Diego — for innovative approach to air taxi design and key contributions to the urban air mobility industry.
- James Keane, NASA Jet Propulsion Laboratory — for innovative and groundbreaking planetary geophysics research, and renowned planetary science illustrations.
- Kaitlin Kratter, University of Arizona, Tucson — for leadership in research about the formation and evolution of stellar and planetary systems beyond our own.
- Lyndsey McMillon-Brown, NASA Glenn Research Center, Cleveland, Ohio — for leadership in photovoltaic research, development, and demonstrations.
- Debbie Senesky, Stanford University, California — for research that has made it possible to operate sensing and electronic devices in high-temperature and radiation-rich environments.
- Helene Seroussi, Dartmouth College, Hanover, New Hampshire — for leading the cryosphere science community in new research directions about the role of ocean circulation in the destabilization of major parts of Antarctica's ice sheets.
- Timothy Smith, NASA Glenn Research Center — for achievements in materials science research, specifically in high temperature alloy innovation.
- Mitchell Spearrin, University of California, Los Angeles — for pioneering scientific and technological advancements in multiple areas critical to NASA's current and future space missions, including rocket propulsion, planetary entry, and sensor systems.
- Michelle Thompson, Purdue University, West Lafayette, Indiana — for research in planetary science and dedication to training the next generation of STEM leaders.
- Mary Beth Wilhelm, NASA Ames Research Center — for achievements in science, technology, and community outreach through her work in the fields of space science and astrobiology.

==== National Institute of Standards and Technology ====
- Kyle Anderson
- Megan Cleveland
- Ann Debay
- Stephen Eckel
- Alexander Grutter
- David Hoogerheide
- Adam Kaufman
- Nikolai Klimov
- Samantha Maragh
- Angela Robinson
- Jeffrey Shainline
- Justyna Zwolak

==== National Oceanic and Atmospheric Administration ====
- Jason Dunion
- Ryan Freedman
- Andrew Hein
- Nadir Jeevanjee
- Lauren Rogers
- Laura Slivinski
- Elizabeth Thompson
- Tiffany Viehman

==== National Science Foundation ====
- Damena Agonafer
- William Anderegg
- Matthew Anderson
- Amirhossein Arzani
- Elizabeth (Libby) Barnes
- Catherine Berdanier
- Marie Berry
- Gurtina Besla
- Antia Botana
- Katherine Bouman
- Barry Bradlyn
- Emily Breza
- Liheng Cai
- Agostino Capponi
- Michael Carbin
- Coleen Carrigan
- Laura Chomiuk
- Steven Crossley
- Ismaila Dabo
- Hannah Dailey
- Amy Dapper
- Christina Delimitrou
- Ying Diao
- Franklin Dollar
- Remy Dou
- Alison Dunn
- Eno Ebong
- Jean Fan
- Brittany Fasy
- Mark Finlayson
- Robert Gilliard, Jr.
- Nuno Gomes Loureiro
- Osvaldo Gutierrez
- James Hambleton
- Paul Harnik
- Kelsey Hatzell
- Josiah Hester
- Naruki Hiranuma
- Guosong Hong
- Nicholas Hutzler
- Mihaela Ifrim
- Daniel Jacobs
- Karin Jensen
- Guillermo Juan Araya
- Zak Kassas
- Aleksandra Korolova
- Danai Koutra
- Oluwasanmi Koyejo
- Heather Kulik
- Duygu Kuzum
- Gibum Kwon
- Matthew Lakin
- Claire Le Goues
- Saniya LeBlanc
- Walter Lee
- Frank Leibfarth
- Sergey Levine
- Wen Li
- Noa Lincoln
- Elise Lockwood
- Margarita Lopez-Uribe
- Fantasy Lozada
- Allyson Mackey
- Raffaella Margutti
- Eileen Martin
- Joel Mejia
- Sonya Neal
- Maital Neta
- Sharon Neufeldt
- Tran Nguyen
- Lauren O'Connell
- Grace O'Connell
- Gavin Price
- David Purpura
- Sally Pusede
- Aaditya Ramdas
- Amanda Randles
- Parisa Rashidi
- Diego Riveros-Iregui
- Ellen Roche
- Tania Roy
- Olga Russakovsky
- Amir Safavi-Naeini
- Michelle Sander
- Soumik Sarkar
- Dipali Sashital
- Laura Schaposnik
- Ashley Shade
- Zengyi Shao
- Aomawa Shields
- Barbara Smith
- Kevin Solomon
- Edgar Solomonik
- Bhuvana Srinivasan
- Kate Starbird
- Julia Stoyanovich
- Ryan Stutsman
- Vanessa Svihla
- Amanda Thomas
- Zhiting Tian
- Steven Townsend
- Ya Wang
- Jill Wegrzyn
- Andrew Wetzel
- Bobby Wilson
- Melanie Wood
- Mary Wootters
- Rachel Wu
- Jie Yin
- Chiu-Tien (Tien-Tien) Yu
- Arash Zaghi

==== Office of Naval Research ====
- Elaheh Ahmadi
- Tamara Broderick
- Chelsea Finn
- Xiaodan Gu
- Mikhail Kats
- Jarad Mason

==== Smithsonian Institution ====
- Cecilia Garraffo
- Michael Johnson
- Andrea Quattrini
- Sabrina Sholts

==== Agricultural Research Service ====
- Amanda Ashworth
- William Hart-Cooper
- Amanda Hulse-Kemp
- Sheri Spiegal

==== Forest Service ====
- Kathryn Baer
- Sean Cahoon
- Lauren Pile Knapp

==== National Institute of Food and Agriculture ====
- Tashara Leak
- Emily Miller-Cushon
- Margaret Worthington

==== United States Geological Survey ====
- Katherine Allstadt
- Alison Appling
- Johanna Blake
- Hannah Dietterich
- Richard Erickson
- Katherine French
- Amy Gartman
- Harrison Gray
- Alexandra Hatem
- Benjamin Mirus
- Erin Wirth Moriarty
- William Yeck
- Jacob Zwart

==== Department of Veterans Affairs ====
- Lewei (Allison) Lin
- Abidemi Ajiboye
- Amy Bohnert
- Umamaheswar Duvvuri
- Scott Hummel
- Paul King
- Justine Lee
- Miranda Lim
- Steve Majerus
- Christopher Miller
- Amanda Raines
- Eric Tkaczyk
- Jason Vassy, VA Boston Healthcare System and Harvard Medical School — for research on implementing genomic medicine in the routine practice of medicine
- Aliza Wingo

== See also ==
- Presidential Young Investigator Award
