= Stephanie B. Hansen =

American plasma physicist

Stephanie Brooke Hansen is an American plasma physicist whose research applies both computational modeling and spectroscopy to inertial confinement fusion. She is a distinguished member of the technical staff in the inertial confinement fusion target design group at Sandia National Laboratories.

== Education and career ==
Hansen earned a bachelor of arts in philosophy, and a bachelor of science in physics, at the University of Nevada, Reno, graduating in 1999. As an undergraduate, she did directed research with Alla Safronova (Shlyaptseva), and she continued at Reno for doctoral research with Safronova, completing her Ph.D. in 2003 with the dissertation Development and application of L-shell spectroscopic modeling for plasma diagnostics.

She was a researcher at the Lawrence Livermore National Laboratory from 2003 to 2008, when she moved to her present position at Sandia National Laboratories.

== Recognition ==
Hansen was a 2017 winner of the Presidential Early Career Award for Scientists and Engineers. In 2019, she was named as a Fellow of the American Physical Society (APS), after a nomination from the APS Division of Plasma Physics, "for contributions to the fundamental modeling of nonequilibrium atoms and radiation in extreme environments, and for the advancement of spectroscopic analysis to increase understanding of diverse laboratory and astrophysical plasmas".
