= Lola Fatoyinbo =

Ecologist

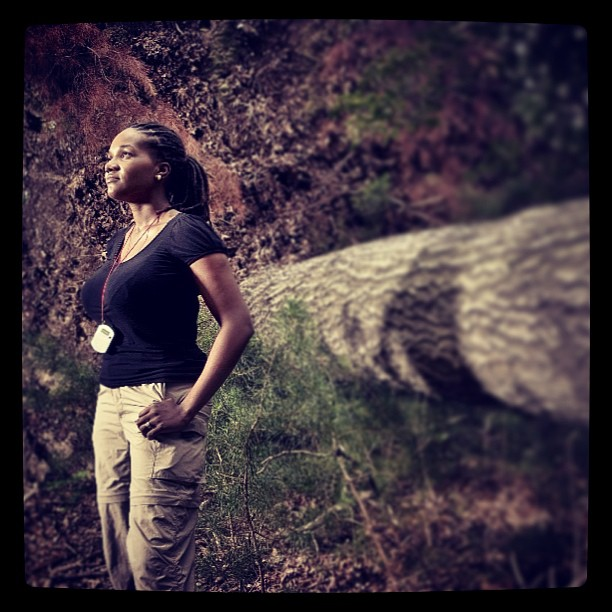
Fatoyinbo in 2012

Temilola Elisabeth (Lola) Fatoyinbo is an ecologist who uses satellite-based remote sensing to study the biodiversity, biomass, and carbon sequestration of forests, particularly flooded forests such as mangroves in Africa. After working for many years for NASA at the Goddard Space Flight Center, she is a MLK Visiting Scholar at the MIT Media Lab for 2025–2026.

== Early life, education, and career ==
Fatoyinbo is African American. She grew up in the Ivory Coast and Benin, moving frequently with her parents; her father, Akintola Fatoyinbo, was originally from Nigeria, and worked for the World Bank and UNESCO, among other international agencies.

She majored in biology at the University of Virginia, originally intending to go into medicine; she became interested in ecology through undergraduate fieldwork in the Bahamas. After graduating in 2003, she continued at the University of Virginia for a 2008 Ph.D. in environmental sciences. Her doctoral dissertation, Growth, dynamics and distribution of mangrove forests in Mozambique, was supervised by Herman H. (Hank) Shugart.

Next, she was a postdoctoral researcher at the University of Florida, and then a NASA Postdoctoral Fellow at the Jet Propulsion Laboratory from 2008 until 2010. She joined the Biospheric Sciences Laboratory at the Goddard Space Flight Center in 2010.

== Recognition ==
Fatoyinbo was a 2011 recipient of the Presidential Early Career Award for Scientists and Engineers, "recognized for exceptional achievement in merging scientific priorities with advanced technology to develop innovative remote-sensing instrumentation for carbon-cycle and ecosystems science". In 2024, the Royal Geographical Society gave her their second annual annual Esmond B. Martin Royal Geographical Society Prize.
