= Julie Jacko =

American health informatics scholar

Julie Anne Jacko is an American scholar of health informatics who works at the University of Edinburgh in Scotland as Chair of Health Informatics and Data Science, Chief Academic Officer of the Usher Institute, and Dean of Innovation and Engagement in the College of Medicine and Veterinary Medicine. Her research interests have included human–computer interaction, accessibility, interactive information visualization, and systems engineering.

== Education and career ==
Jacko studied industrial engineering at Purdue University, receiving a bachelor's degree, master's degree, and Ph.D. respectively in 1990, 1991, and 1993.

She began her academic career as an assistant professor of industrial engineering at The College of New Jersey from 1993 to 1996. After two years as an assistant professor of industrial and systems engineering at Florida International University, and two more years as an assistant professor of industrial engineering at the University of Wisconsin–Madison, she moved to Georgia Tech in 2000 as an associate professor in the School of Industrial & Systems Engineering. In 2005 she joined the Wallace H. Coulter Department of Biomedical Engineering there, and in 2006 she was promoted to full professor, added an affiliation with the School of Interactive Computing, and became director for research of the Health Systems Institute.

In 2007, Jacko moved to the University of Minnesota as founding director of the Institute for Health Informatics. She shifted her position there in 2010 to become a professor in the School of Public Health, Division of Environmental Health Sciences. She went on adjunct status in 2013, after a legal case concerning several months of overlapping employment between Georgia Tech and the University of Minnesota. In 2017 she returned to academia as professor and founding chair of the Department of Population Health Sciences and professor in the Department of Decision Sciences at Nova Southeastern University.

She took her present position as Chair of Health Informatics and Data Science at the University of Edinburgh in 2023, and was named Interim Director of the Usher Institute and Dean of Innovation and Engagement in 2024. In early 2025, Cathie Sudlow was appointed Director of the Usher Institute and Jacko took the role of Chief Academic Officer.

== Recognition ==
While at the University of Wisconsin, Jacko was a 1998 recipient of the Presidential Early Career Award for Scientists and Engineers, "for innovations in matching partially sighted computer users with hardware/software combinations allowing them to use graphical interfaces, and for developing graduate courses on related technologies".
