= Rachel Carter =

American battery researcher

Rachel A. Carter is an American mechanical engineer whose research focuses on rechargeable batteries for energy storage, including improvements to the design of sodium–sulfur batteries, lithium-ion batteries, and sodium-ion batteries. She is an associate professor of mechanical engineering at the University of Kansas.

== Education and career ==
Carter is the granddaughter of Donald L. Kinser, a mechanical engineering professor at Vanderbilt University. She chose mechanical engineering at Vanderbilt for both her undergraduate and graduate education, completing her Ph.D. there in 2017 under the supervision of Cary Pint. Her doctoral research involved the development of the first room-temperature sodium-sulfur batteries.

In 2017, she joined the United States Naval Research Laboratory as a postdoctoral researcher, working there on the safety of lithium-ion batteries in aerospace applications with Corey T. Love. She became a full-time researcher at the Naval Research Laboratory in 2019, at the same time changing her focus to the design of sodium-ion batteries. In 2026, she moved to the University of Kansas as an associate professor.

== Recognition ==
Carter was a 2025 recipient of the Presidential Early Career Award for Scientists and Engineers.
