= Michelle Pantoya =

American combustion engineer

Michelle L. Pantoya is an American mechanical engineer who studies combustion of solid fuels, such as nanocomposites of thermite. She is also an author of children's books on engineering. She is the J.W. Wright Regents Endowed Chair Professor in Mechanical Engineering at Texas Tech University.

== Education and career ==
Pantoya was a student at the University of California, Davis, where she earned a bachelor's degree in aeronautical engineering in 1992. After a summer internship at the Combustion Research Facility of the Sandia National Laboratory, she shifted her interests to mechanical engineering, continuing at Davis to earn a master's degree in 1994 and complete her Ph.D. in 1999. Her dissertation, Decomposition behaviors of energetic materials immersed in molten salt, was supervised by Benjamin Shaw.

She was a part-time faculty member at California State University, Sacramento before joining Texas Tech as an assistant professor in 2000. She was promoted to associate professor in 2005 and full professor in 2010, and named as J.W. Wright Regents Endowed Chair Professor in 2014.

== Recognition ==
Pantoya was a 2004 winner of the Presidential Early Career Award for Scientists and Engineers.
