= Tammy Ma =

American physicist

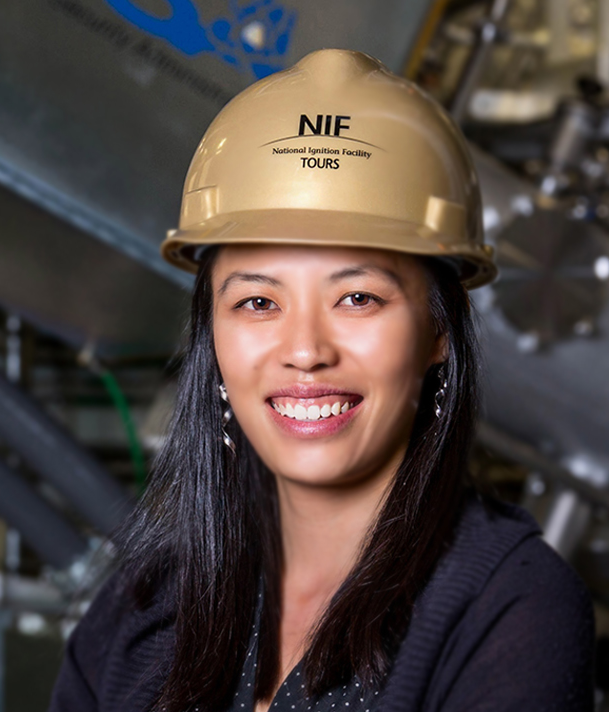
- Education: Caltech (BE 2005); UC San Diego (MS 2008, PhD 2010)
- Scientific career
- Fields: Plasma physics
- Workplaces: Lawrence Livermore National Laboratory
- Thesis: Electron generation and transport in intense relativistic laser-plasma interactions relevant to fast ignition ICF (2010)
- Doctoral advisor: Farhat Beg

Tammy Ma is an American plasma physicist who works on inertial confinement fusion at the Lawrence Livermore National Laboratory.

== Education and career ==
Ma studied aerospace engineering at the California Institute of Technology, graduating in 2005 with a degree in aerospace engineering. She went to the University of California, San Diego for graduate study, earning a master's degree in 2008 and completing her Ph.D. in aerospace engineering in 2010.

After postdoctoral research at the Lawrence Livermore National Laboratory, she joined the laboratory as a staff scientist in 2012.

In 2026, Ma was chosen to be a member of the Department of Energy's Office of Science Advisory Committee.

== Recognition ==
Ma was a recipient of the Presidential Early Career Award for Scientists and Engineers, in 2013. She was the 2016 winner of the Thomas H. Stix Award for Outstanding Early Career Contributions to Plasma Physics Research of the American Physical Society (APS), "for innovation and leadership in quantifying hydrodynamic instability mix in inertial confinement fusion implosions at the National Ignition Facility and for key contributions to experiments demonstrating fusion fuel gains exceeding unity". In 2021, she won the Excellence in Fusion Engineering Award of the Fusion Power Associates, and was named a Fellow of the American Physical Society, after a nomination from the APS Division of Plasma Physics, "for outstanding scientific contributions and leadership in the field of intense laser-matter interactions and inertial fusion energy science".
