= Linwei Wang =

Chinese-American computer scientist

Linwei Wang is a Chinese-American computer scientist, the Bruce B. Bates Endowed Professor in the Department of Computing and Information Sciences at the Rochester Institute of Technology. Her research focuses on the applications of artificial intelligence in computational biomedicine and personalized medicine.

== Education and career ==
Wang received a bachelor's degree in optic-electronic information engineering from Zhejiang University in China in 2005, and a master's degree in electronic and computer engineering from the Hong Kong University of Science and Technology in 2007. She completed her Ph.D. in computing and information science at the Rochester Institute of Technology in 2009. Her doctoral dissertation, Personalized Noninvasive Imaging of Volumetric Cardiac Electrophysiology, was supervised by Pengcheng Shi.

She continued at the Rochester Institute of Technology as an assistant professor of computing and information science from 2009 to 2015, associate professor from 2015 to 2020, and full professor since 2021. In 2025 she was named as the Bruce B. Bates Endowed Professor.

== Recognition ==
Wang is a 2015 recipient of the Presidential Early Career Award for Scientists and Engineers, "for pioneering three-dimensional imaging of the heart through innovations in modeling large, complex systems in order to improve patient care, and for her outstanding record of leading collaborative progress in the scientific community and commitment to education".
