= Elliott H. Margulies =

American geneticist

- Education: Rutgers University (B.S.); University of Michigan (Ph.D.)
- Occupation: biologist
- Employer: Illumina

Elliott H. Margulies is director of scientific research at Illumina Cambridge. He was previously an investigator at the National Human Genome Research Institute (NHGRI) focusing on the use of high-throughput DNA sequencing technologies to elucidate basic genome biology and important clinical problems.

== Awards ==
Dr. Margulies was awarded a Presidential Early Career Award for Scientists and Engineers in 2007.
