= Paul Torrens =

American computer scientist

Paul Morrison Torrens
- Education: University College London (PhD.); Trinity College, Dublin
- Scientific career
- Fields: geographer computer scientist
- Workplaces: New York University
- Doctoral advisor: Michael Batty

Paul Morrison Torrens is a professor in New York University Tandon School of Engineering's Department of Computer Science and Engineering and Center for Urban Science and Progress. He co-authored the book Geosimulation: Automata-Based Modeling of Urban Phenomena.

Torrens was the recipient of a Presidential Early Career Award for Scientists and Engineers from the National Science Foundation in 2007.
