= Todd Lowary =

American carbohydrate chemist

- Born: 1966 (age 59–60); Canton, Illinois, US
- Awards: Presidential Early Career Award for Scientists and Engineers

Academic background
- Education: BA, chemistry, 1988, University of Montana; Ph.D., organic chemistry, 1993, University of Alberta
- Thesis: Recognition of synthetic oligosaccharide analogs by the blood-group A, B and H gene-specified glycosyltransferases. (1993)
- Doctoral advisor: Ole Hindsgaul
- Other advisors: David R. Bundle; Morten P. Meldal

Academic work
- Institutions: Academia Sinica; University of Alberta; Ohio State University
- Website: lowarylab.ca

Todd Lambert Lowary (born 1966) is an American carbohydrate chemist. He is a professor of chemistry at the University of Alberta and a Fellow of the Royal Society of Canada.

== Early life and education ==
Lowary was born in 1966 in Illinois. While attending Columbus High School, Lowary participated in band and was chosen to represent Montana in the 1983 Macy's Thanksgiving Day Parade. Following graduation, Lowary chose to attend the University of Montana where he majored in chemistry. Prior to the 1985–86 academic year, Lowary was one of seven University of Montana students awarded the Fox Foundation Scholarship to continue his studies. The following year, he received the 1986–87 University of Montana Honors Program scholarship.

After Lowary graduated with his Bachelor of Science degree in 1988, Lowary remained at the University of Montana working in their wood chemistry lab before applying to graduate school. He eventually completed his PhD in organic chemistry at the University of Alberta and finished his postdoctoral research with David R. Bundle and Morten P. Meldal.

== Career ==
Following his PhD, Lowary accepted an assistant professor position at Ohio State University in 1996. In this role, Lowary was awarded a Presidential Early Career Award for Scientists and Engineers for "studying synthesis and conformations of compounds in bacterial cell walls, and designing courses that incorporate the latest educational technology." He was eventually promoted to the rank of associate professor in 2002 but left the following year to return to the University of Alberta. Lowary joined the Alberta Ingenuity Centre for Carbohydrate Science (AICCS) in 2003 as a replacement for Ole Hindsgaul. As a member of the AICCS, Lowary's research group focused on techniques that use nuclear magnetic resonance spectroscopy, chemical synthesis, and computational chemistry to examine the shape of the polysaccharides that make up the cell wall of the tuberculosis bacterium.

During his first year at U of A, Lowary continued to study tuberculosis and collaborated with Bundle and Monica Palcic in the Glycobiology Research Group which had "a major impact on the international carbohydrate community." As the director of the AICCS, Lowary focused on identifying and validating tuberculosis markers and developing tools to improve health in the developing world. Using a grant from the Bill & Melinda Gates Foundation, Lowary led a project with the goal of developing better diagnostic tools for tuberculosis and improve heart transplants in infants. In 2006, Lowary received an E.W.R. Steacie Memorial Fellowship to study why the sugars in the polysaccharide significantly enhance the flexibility of the polysaccharide. As a result of his overall research, Lowary and four members of the Alberta Glycomics Centre received a 2012 Brockhouse Canada Prize for Interdisciplinary Research in Science and Engineering for their "collaborative contributions to novel strategies in combating infectious diseases such as E. coli, tuberculosis and Clostridium difficile."

As a result of his research into carbohydrates, Lowary was awarded a Tier 1 Canada Research Chair in Carbohydrate Chemistry in 2015. In this role, he was selected to lead the Canadian Glycomics Network out of the University of Alberta. As such, he received the 2015 Award for Outstanding Leadership in Alberta Science for being the "driving force behind Canada’s lead in glycomics." A few years later, Lowary collaborated with a team of international experts to develop a urine test called Fujifilm SILVAMP TB LAM to detect tuberculosis in HIV-positive people. In 2019, Lowary became the first University of Alberta researcher to receive an Arthur C. Cope Scholar Award from the American Chemical Society. The award was given in honour of his excellence in organic chemistry.

In recognition of his "contributions to the synthesis of molecules to probe the biological role of carbohydrates," Lowary was elected a Fellow of the Royal Society of Canada in 2020.
