= Jennifer Stern =

American planetary geochemist

Jennifer C. Stern
- Education: Brown University (B.A., 1998); Florida State University (Ph.D., 2005)
- Known for: Detections of indigenous nitrates on Mars; Instrument development for the Curiosity Rover and Dragonfly mission
- Awards: Presidential Early Career Award for Scientists and Engineers (2019)

Jennifer Claire Stern is an American planetary scientist and geochemist at NASA's Goddard Space Flight Center. Her research concerns the chemistry of the surfaces and atmospheres of planets, particularly focusing on the atmosphere of Mars, the search for the chemical building blocks for life in extraterrestrial environments, and the habitability of extreme environments on the Earth. She was the lead author of a study that found nitrates on Mars.

== Education and career ==
As a high school student, Stern's preferred subjects were visual arts and English; she went into science as a career that would involve spending time outdoors. She majored in geology and biology at Brown University, graduating in 1998. Next, she completed a Ph.D. in geology in 2005 at Florida State University.

She joined NASA in 2005 as a postdoctoral researcher at the Ames Research Center in California in 2005, continuing as a postdoctoral fellow at the Goddard Space Flight Center beginning in 2007. She has been a research space scientist at the Goddard Space Flight Center since 2008.

== Recognition ==
Stern was a 2019 recipient of the Presidential Early Career Award for Scientists and Engineers, honored "for Mars habitability and life detection". She was the 2023 recipient of the Picarro Inc. "People's Choice" Hero Award.
