= Heather Whitley =

American physicist

Heather D. Whitley is an American physicist whose research concentrates on high energy density environments, such as in stars, in simulated high-density plasma, and in inertial confinement fusion experiments. She works at the Lawrence Livermore National Laboratory in its National Ignition Facility and as an associate program director in the Weapons Physics and Design Program.

== Education and career ==
Whitley grew up in a family of seven children in Silver City, New Mexico and Roswell, New Mexico. She became an undergraduate at New Mexico State University, with a double major in chemistry and French, graduating in 2002. She continued her studies at the graduate level at the University of California, Berkeley. Her doctoral research involved semicondicting nanomaterials with potential applications in solar cells.

On completing her doctorate in 2007, she joined the Lawrence Livermore National Laboratory, starting as a postdoctoral researcher in the Quantum Simulations Group and continuing as a staff physicist in 2011.

== Recognition ==
Whitley received a 2011 Presidential Early Career Award for Scientists and Engineers. She was named as a distinguished alumna of New Mexico State University in 2023.
