= Helene Seroussi =

Glaciologist

- Education: Ecole Centrale Paris
- Scientific career
- Thesis: Modélisation des calottes polaires par des formulations multi-modèles (2011)

Hélène Seroussi is a professor at Dartmouth College who is known for her work on ice sheets and ice-ocean interations. She was named a Presidential Early Career Award for Scientists and Engineers fellow in 2025.

== Education and career ==
Seroussi has an M.S. (2008) and a Ph.D. (2011) from École Centrale Paris. She moved to Dartmouth College in 2021, and as of 2026 she is a professor of engineering.

== Research ==
Seroussi is known for her work in glaciology, the study of ice. Her research uses modeling to examine changes over time at the Antarctic Ice Sheet and how such changes impact sea level. Her early research centered on the Greenland Ice Sheet where she examined the rate of change of the ice sheet using ice thickness data from airborne radar. In Antarctica, she led work that detailed the presence of a plume of warm water under Antarctica that impacts the stability of the region's ice sheet. She has also modeled the loss of glacial ice at Thwaites Glacier and the subsequent impact on sea level change.

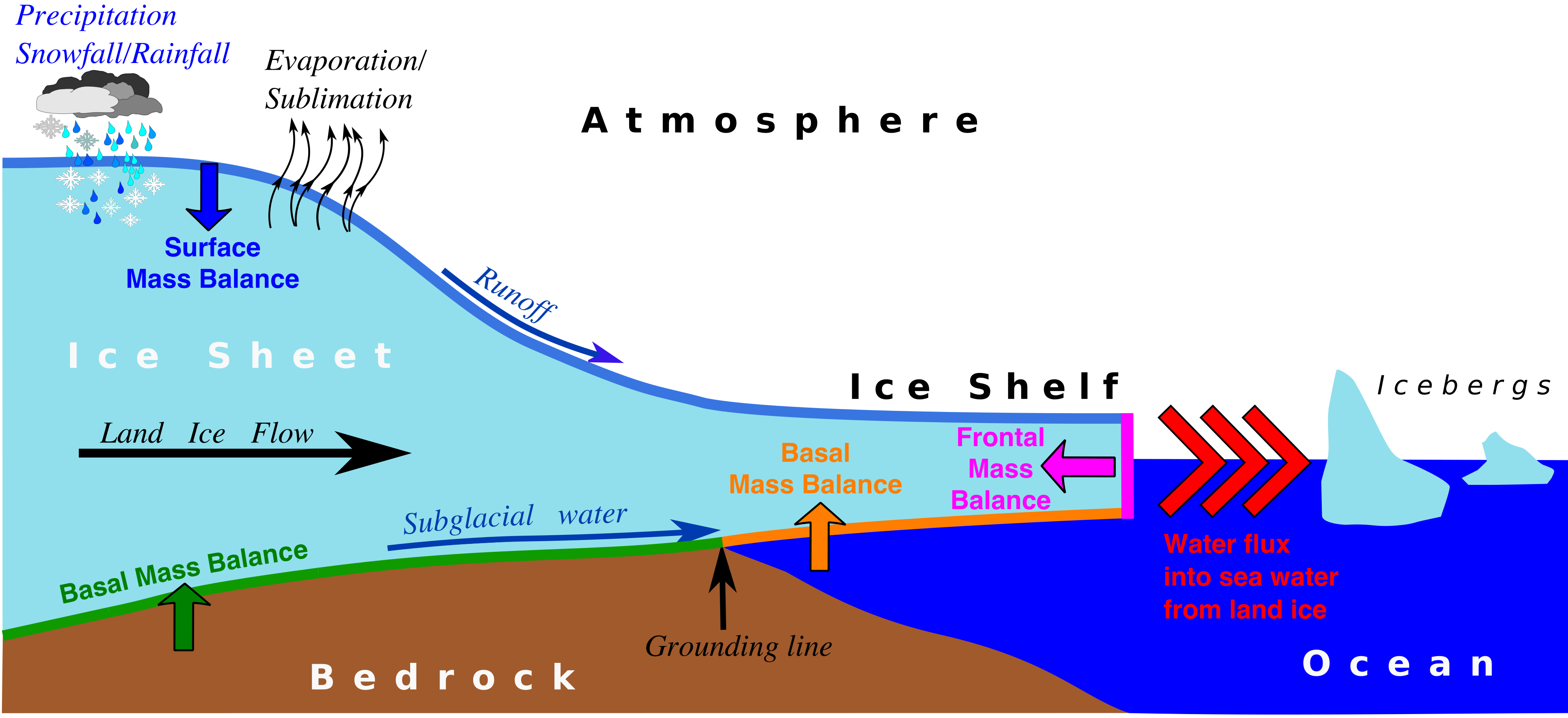
Seroussi's work has revealed the presence of a plume of warm water under the ice sheets of Antarctica.

== Awards and honors ==
In 2020 she received a Cryosphere Early Career Award from the American Geophysical Union. In 2025 Seroussi received a Presidential Early Career Award for Scientists and Engineers.

== Selected publications ==
- Larour, E.; Seroussi, H.; Morlighem, M.; Rignot, E. (2012). "Continental scale, high order, high spatial resolution, ice sheet modeling using the Ice Sheet System Model (ISSM)". Journal of Geophysical Research: Earth Surface. 117 (F1). doi:10.1029/2011JF002140. ISSN 0148-0227.
- Rignot, E.; Mouginot, J.; Morlighem, M.; Seroussi, H.; Scheuchl, B. (2014-05-28). "Widespread, rapid grounding line retreat of Pine Island, Thwaites, Smith, and Kohler glaciers, West Antarctica, from 1992 to 2011". Geophysical Research Letters. 41 (10): 3502–3509. doi:10.1002/2014GL060140. ISSN 0094-8276.
- Seroussi, H.; Nakayama, Y.; Larour, E.; Menemenlis, D.; Morlighem, M.; Rignot, E.; Khazendar, A. (2017-06-28). "Continued retreat of Thwaites Glacier, West Antarctica, controlled by bed topography and ocean circulation". Geophysical Research Letters. 44 (12): 6191–6199. doi:10.1002/2017GL072910. ISSN 0094-8276.
- Seroussi, Hélène; Nowicki, Sophie; Payne, Antony J.; Goelzer, Heiko; Lipscomb, William H.; Abe-Ouchi, Ayako; et al. (2020-09-17). "ISMIP6 Antarctica: a multi-model ensemble of the Antarctic ice sheet evolution over the 21st century". The Cryosphere. 14 (9): 3033–3070. doi:10.5194/tc-14-3033-2020. hdl:2013/ULB-DIPOT:oai:dipot.ulb.ac.be:2013/313217. ISSN 1994-0424.
