= Leigh McCue =

American marine engineer

Leigh Shaw McCue-Weil is an American marine engineer who applies computational fluid dynamics to study the nonlinear and chaotic motion of watercraft (vessel dynamics). She is an associate professor of mechanical engineering at George Mason University, chair of the Department of Mechanical Engineering there, and former executive director of the American Society of Naval Engineers.

== Education and career ==
McCue majored in mechanical and aerospace engineering at Princeton University, graduating in 2000. After earning a master's degree in aerospace engineering at the University of Michigan, she switched to naval architecture and marine engineering, earning a second master's degree there in 2002 and completing her Ph.D. in 2004. Her dissertation, Chaotic Vessel Motions And Capsize In Beam Seas, was supervised by Armin Troesch.

She became a faculty member in the Virginia Tech Department of Aerospace and Ocean Engineering from 2004 to 2015. From 2015 to 2018 she was executive director of the American Society of Naval Engineers. In 2019 she took her present position at George Mason University.

== Recognition ==
At Virginia Tech, McCue won a Presidential Early Career Award for Scientists and Engineers for 2008, and in 2013 was given the Rosenblatt Young Naval Engineer Award of the American Society of Naval Engineers.

In 2020, the American Society of Naval Engineers gave McCue their Frank G. Law Award for service to the ANSE.
