= Julia Kubanek =

Julia Kubanek is a Professor in the Schools of Biological Sciences and of Chemistry & Biochemistry in the College of Sciences at the Georgia Institute of Technology. She is also the Vice President for Interdisciplinary Research for Georgia Tech. She is also Co-Director of the Aquatic Chemical Ecology Center (Georgia Tech) and member of the American Association for the Advancement of Science, the American Chemical Society, the Association for the Sciences of Limnology and Oceanography, the International Society of Chemical Ecology, the International Society for the Study of Harmful Algae and the American Association of Underwater Science

== Education and career ==
Kubanek studied at Queen's University and got her Chemistry degree in 1991. She completed her doctoral studies in 1998 at the University of British Columbia. In 1998, she moved as post-doctoral researcher to the Scripps Institution of Oceanography in California and after, in 2001, to the University of North Carolina Wilmington.

In 2001 she became Assistant Professor and in 2006 Associate Professor in the School of Biology and School of Chemistry & Biochemistry at the Georgia Institute of Technology. In 2009 she became Associate Chair of the School of Biology and Co-Director of the Center for Aquatic Chemical Ecology. From 2010 to 2013 she was Waernska Guest Professor in the University of Gothenburg, Sweden. Since 2011 she is Professor in the School of Biology and School of Chemistry & Biochemistry at Georgia Tech. Between 2014 and 2021, she was Associate Dean for Research of the College of Sciences of Georgia Tech. Since 2021, she is the Vice President for Interdisciplinary Research for Georgia Tech.

== Research ==
Kubanek's research interests are focused on the chemical signalling used by marine organisms to communicate with each other and with the environment. This research is multi-disciplinary as it crosses organic chemistry, chemical ecology, and chemical biology. Kubanek's research has revealed how seaweed produce a chemical compound, lobophorolide, that enables the seaweed to resist predation by marine fungi. Further research has revealed the presence of organic compounds on the surfaces of seaweed that inhibit growth of marine fungi. Other notable research projects characterize organic compounds that act as allelopathic chemicals in corals and Caribbean sponges. Kubanek also leads research projects into the chemical signals from the red tide producing Karenia brevis. Through screening of compounds produced by sea squirts, Kubanek's lab found compounds that can act as antifungal agents, which may lead to the development of novel drugs to prevent the growth of fungus. Kubanek's research on the compounds found in the urine of blue crabs was described in a New York Times article that presented the research in a manner readily accessible to the general public.

Kubanek has three patents filed in the United States: ABC transporter ligand GATX1, Compounds and compositions useful in the treatment of malaria, and Methods for inhibiting CLC-2 channel with GATX2.

== Awards ==
- National Science Foundation Presidential Early Career Award for Scientists and Engineers (PECASE) Award (2002)
- Georgia Tech Faculty Outstanding Faculty Member (2009)
- Silverstein-Simenone Award, International Society of Chemical Ecology, for 'contributions to the field of chemical ecology' (2012)
- AAAS Fellow (2012)
