= Stergios Roumeliotis =

Electrical Engineer

Stergios Roumeliotis is an engineer and adjunct professor at the Department of Computer Science and Engineering at the University of Minnesota, Minneapolis. He was named a Fellow of the Institute of Electrical and Electronics Engineers (IEEE) in 2016 for his contributions to visual-inertial navigation and cooperative localization.
