= Catherine P. Bradshaw =

American developmental psychologist

Catherine Pilcher Bradshaw
- Occupation(s): Researcher and professor at the University of Virginia

Catherine Pilcher Bradshaw is an American developmental psychologist and academic. Bradshaw's research focuses on the development of aggressive behavior as well as the prevention of mental health problems in school-based settings.

== Biography ==
Bradshaw is professor and associate dean for research and faculty development at the School of Education and Human Development (formerly the Curry School of Education) at the University of Virginia. Bradshaw is currently the editor of the journal Prevention Science. She has authored over 200 research publications and has been cited over 15,000 times. She is also a co-author of the book "Preventing Bullying in Schools: A Social and Emotional Learning Approach to Prevention and Early Intervention." She was honored in 2019 by the Society for Prevention Research with the Prevention Science Award and in 2018 by the National Center for School Mental Health with the School Mental Health Research Award.
