= William Paul King =

American mechanical engineer

William Paul King is an American mechanical engineer, currently the Ralph A. Andersen Endowed Chair at the University of Illinois.
