= Christine Ortiz =

- Occupation(s): Dean of students and professor

Christine Ortiz is the dean of graduate education at the Massachusetts Institute of Technology (MIT), and Morris Cohen Professor of Materials Science and Engineering.

The goal of Ortiz's research program is a mechanistic-based understanding of tissue function, quality, and pathology. She is planning to create a new university, centered on project-based learning.

== Education ==
- BS, Rensselaer Polytechnic Institute, 1992
- PhD, Cornell University, 1997
