= John Shanklin =

British-American biologist

John Shanklin is a British-American biologist, focusing in lipids, currently at Brookhaven National Laboratory and an Elected Fellow of the American Association for the Advancement of Science. Shanklin grew up near Manchester, studied for his BSc at Lancaster University and gained his PhD from the University of Wisconsin. He was named Battelle 'Inventor of the Year' in 2017.
