= Operation Reflex =

Cold War operation

- Reflex Action; Part of Cold War
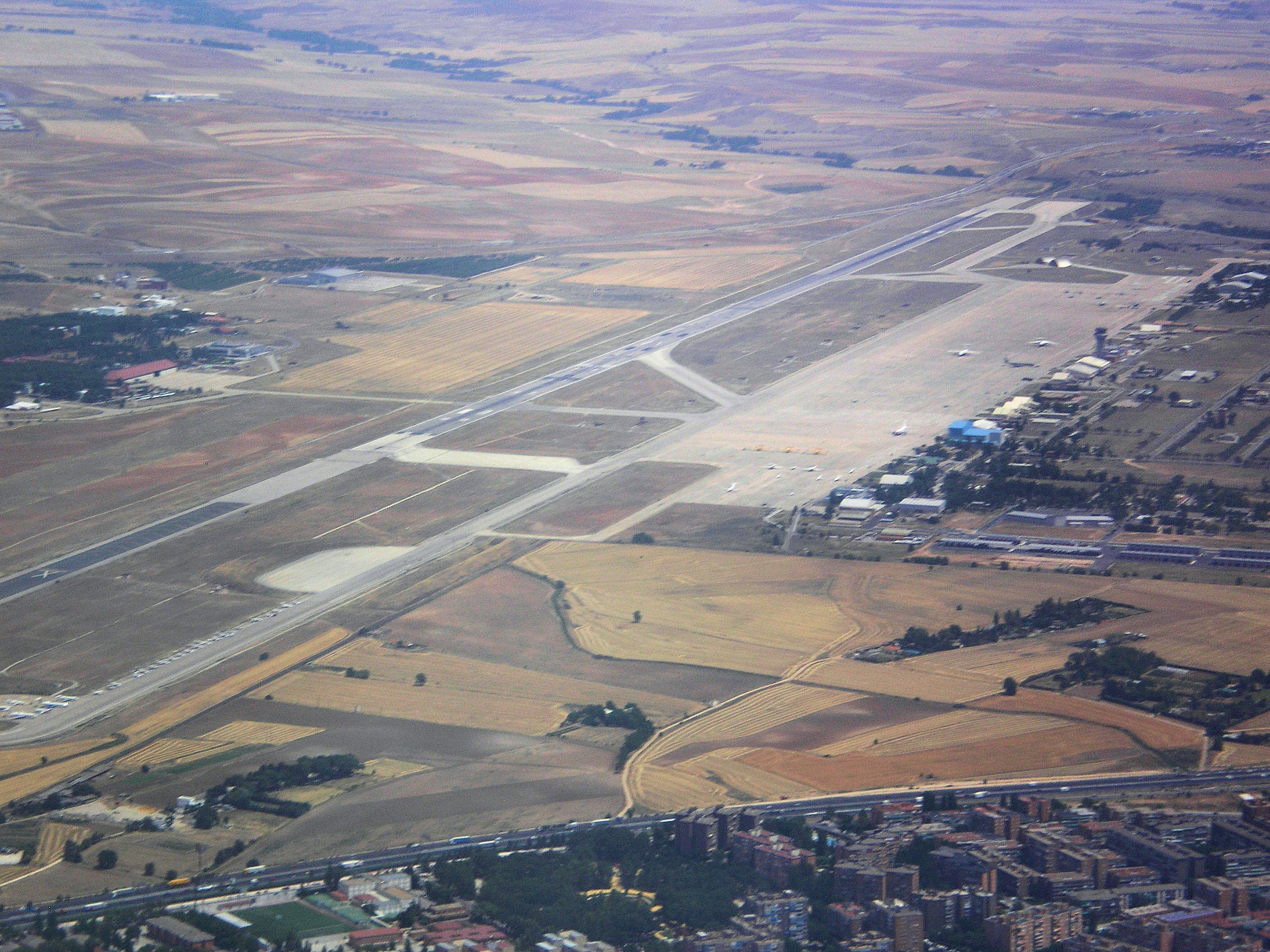
- Torrejon Air Base, a Strategic Air Command Reflex base
- Operational scope: Strategic
- Location: England, Morocco, Spain
- Planned by: Strategic Air Command
- Objective: Nuclear deterrence
- Date: 1 November 1957–31 March 1965

Operation Reflex was a Cold War operation that placed medium bombers of Strategic Air Command (SAC) on nuclear alert at European and North African stations that were closer to their potential targets than their home bases in the United States. It began in 1957 and continued until 1965, when it ended as a result of the increased number of weapons systems capable of striking targets from stations in the United States, fiscal decisions and the pending removal of Boeing B-47 Stratojets from SAC's inventory.

== Background ==
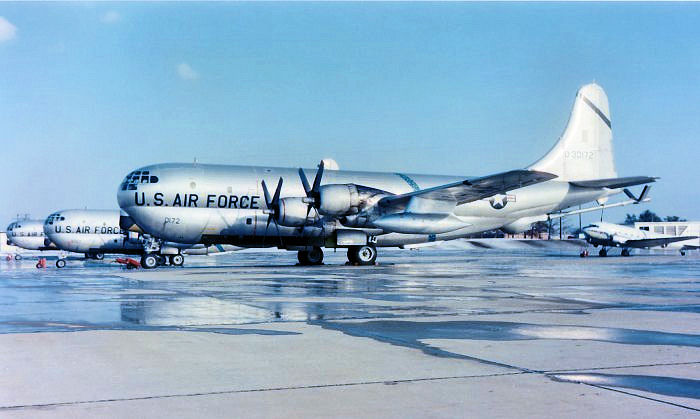
SAC KC-97G Stratofreighters (Note: Aircraft is Boeing KC-97G-29-BO Stratofreighter, serial 53-0172 of the 100th Air Refueling Squadron. This plane was later converted to a KC-97L and transferred to the Spanish Air Force. Dirkx, Marco (7 June 2025). "1953 USAF Serial Numbers". Joe Baugher’s Serial Number List.)

With the exception of the Convair B-36 Peacemaker, early Strategic Air Command (SAC) bombers had to deploy to forward bases to be in range of targets in the Soviet Union. During the Berlin Airlift, SAC deployed 62 Boeing B-29 Superfortresses from MacDill and Rapid City Air Force Bases to England. Starting in the early 1950s, SAC began to rotate its medium bomber units to England for 90 day periods. Rotation bases were added in Spain and Morocco as well as England for missions heading eastward and to Andersen Air Force Base, Guam for those heading west. These bombers' home bases in the United States were designed more to facilitate deployments than to support attacks on the Soviet Union. Until Limestone Air Force Base, Maine was constructed, even B-36s relied on staging bases in Labrador and Newfoundland.

Although doctrine called for theater commanders to control bases and forces under their control, SAC's experience during the Korean War, in which its two deployed B-29 wings, the 22nd and 92nd, operated from Far East Air Forces (FEAF) bases and operated under FEAF control, (Note: Ultimately, the theater commander (in this case an Army general, Douglas MacArthur), approved targeting for the SAC bombers in the Pacific, overruling requests to concentrate on strategic targets in North Korea. Schake, p. 69. Later, SAC was able to deploy the 98th and 307th Bombardment Groups for 30 days of temporary duty to strike strategic targets. When they remained in the Far East beyond the 30 days, they came under FEAF control. Schake, p. 70.) convinced it that it needed to be able to operate from overseas bases under its control.

While overseas bases continued to be required while SAC maintained a medium bomber force, they became primarily recovery bases or bases from which a second strike might be launched. However, although SAC bombers were deployed to forward locations where they would be able to strike targets in the Soviet Union, they were not on nuclear alert. In the mid-1950s, the Soviet Union began to substantially increase its long range bomber force. In response, SAC planners proposed to keep SAC bombers on alert with weapons loaded and crews nearby, ready for takeoff. After several tests of the concept, SAC units began to put planes and crews on alert on 1 October 1957. 1 November, SAC announced publicly that it had armed bombers at the end of runways ready to take off within 15 minutes.

== Reflex alert operations ==
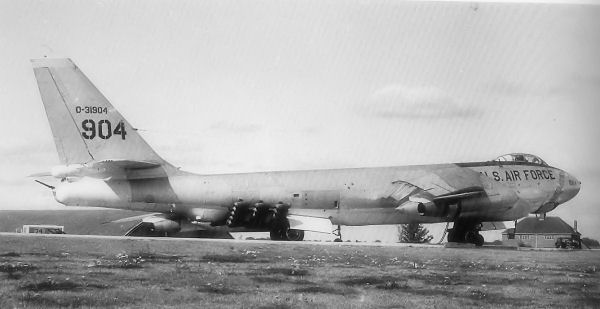
B-47 on Reflex alert at RAF Brize Norton

Preparation for overseas alert began in July 1957, when four wings from SAC's Second Air Force each sent five bombers to Sidi Slimane Air Base, Morocco. On 1 October, overseas nuclear alert began, called Operation Reflex. (Note: Although properly named "Reflex Action," it was more commonly called Operation Reflex, or simply Reflex. Schake, p. 181.) Reflex tours of duty in Europe and Morocco were usually for 90 days, and individuals, rather than units, rotated overseas. In addition to positioning its strike force closer to targets in the Soviet Union, Reflex dispersed SAC's bomber force, making it more difficult to target. Unlike earlier SAC unit deployments overseas, Reflex aircraft did not fly training or operational missions, but remained on ground alert while deployed.

A typical Reflex deployment would resemble that at RAF Fairford, which began Reflex operations on 7 January 1958. Second Air Force and Eighth Air Force each operated fifteen B-47s split between Fairford and RAF Greenham Common. These planes were drawn from six different bombardment wings. Individual aircraft were rotated weekly. When aircraft rotated, they did not necessarily return to the United States, but sometimes moved to another Reflex base. There were more crews than aircraft. Crews typically arrived at their Reflex bases on SAC KC-97s, rather than with ferried bombers. Typical cycles for aircrew involved two week-long alert periods, with a week's rest between.

By the middle of 1958, SAC had six bombers on alert at each of its bases in England, Morocco and Spain. During the Lebanon Crisis of 1958, the Berlin Crisis of 1961 and the Cuban Missile Crisis, the number of Reflex aircraft maintained on alert was increased.

The gradual phase out of Boeing B-47 Stratojets and Boeing KC-97 Stratofreighters from SAC's inventory, coupled with a serious balance of payments problem led to the end of Operation Reflex. An earlier RAND study indicated that forward based bombers were vulnerable to attacks by Soviet light bombers stationed in satellite nations, (Note: Primarily from bases in the German Democratic Republic. SAC sought to minimize this threat by selecting bases that, while within the range of its medium bombers to their assigned targets, were as far away from Soviet light bomber bases as possible. Schake, p. 96.) while Soviet long range aviation would still be available to attack the United States. Moreover, Boeing B-52 Stratofortress heavy bombers were capable of extending their range through air refueling from Boeing KC-135 Stratotankers. SAC revised its basing policy with one named Full House, in which B-47s would be located in the United States, using KC-97s stationed in the Northeastern United States (Note: KC-97s were also stationed in or deployed to Canada, Greenland, Bermuda, and Alaska. Haulman, p. 60.) to give them a head start to refuel bombers, which would be able to strike Soviet targets directly. Finally, developments in nuclear weapons provided lighter nuclear warheads, which in turn made intercontinental ballistic missiles practical delivery systems by the early 1960s. The Navy was also able to deploy submarine-launched ballistic missiles in the early 1960s.

SAC was also switching from a "perimeter" strategy, relying on bases in foreign nations to a "polar" strategy, allowing its bombers to strike from bases in the United States. Reductions in Operation Reflex began in 1963 with the withdrawal of the United States military from Morocco. (Note: The establishment of these bases had been negotiated with the French government. After Morocco became independent, there was substantial opposition to their continued use. Schrake, p. 115, n. 45.) The program was finally phased out on 31 March 1965.

== Reflex bases ==
The following list, organized by country, lists the supporting SAC unit and the unit responsible for nuclear weapons at the installation:

=== Morocco ===
- 5th Air Division (later 4310th Air Division)
- Ben Guerir Air Base

3926th Air Base Group (later Combat Support Group)
10th Aviation Depot Squadron (later Munitions Maintenance Squadron)

- Nouasseur Air Base

3922nd Air Base Group (later Combat Support Group)
6th Aviation Depot Squadron (later Munitions Maintenance Squadron)

- Sidi Slimane Air Base

3906th Air Base Group (later Combat Support Group)
5th Aviation Depot Squadron (later Munitions Maintenance Squadron)

=== Spain ===
- Sixteenth Air Force (Note: SAC's 65th Air Division in Spain was devoted to the air defense mission, and reflex support units were assigned directly to Sixteenth Air Force.)
- Moron Air Base

3973rd Air Base Group (later Combat Support Group)
15th Aviation Depot Squadron (later Munitions Maintenance Squadron)

- Torrejon Air Base

3970th Air Base Group (later Combat Support Group)
1st Aviation Depot Squadron (later Munitions Maintenance Squadron)

- Zaragoza Air Base

3974th Air Base Group (later Combat Support Group)
13th Aviation Depot Squadron (later Munitions Maintenance Squadron)

=== United Kingdom ===
- 7th Air Division
- RAF Brize Norton

3920th Air Base Group (later Combat Support Group)
2nd Aviation Depot Squadron (later Munitions Maintenance Squadron)
4th Aviation Depot Squadron

- RAF Fairford

3920th Air Base Group (later Combat Support Group)
9th Aviation Depot Squadron (later Munitions Maintenance Squadron)

- RAF Greenham Common

3909 Air Base Group (later Combat Support Group)
4th Aviation Depot Squadron (later Munitions Maintenance Squadron)

- RAF Lakenheath

3910 Air Base Group (later Combat Support Group)
8th Aviation Depot Squadron
99th Aviation Depot Squadron (later Munitions Maintenance Squadron)

- RAF Mildenhall

3913th Combat Support Group
19th Aviation Depot Squadron

- RAF Upper Heyford

3918th Air Base Group (later Combat Support Group)
11th Aviation Depot Squadron (later Munitions Maintenance Squadron)

== See also ==
- List of B-47 units of the United States Air Force
