= Olds (surname) =

Olds is a surname, and may refer to:

- Bert Olds (1891–1953), Australian rules footballer
- Bill Olds (born 1951) American professional football player
- Carl D. Olds (1912–1979), New Zealand-born American mathematician
- Chauncey N. Olds (1816–1890), American politician
- Edson B. Olds (1802–1869), American politician
- Elizabeth Olds (1896–1991), American printmaker
- Doug Olds, Australian rules footballer
- Gabriel Olds (born 1972), American actor
- Gamaliel S. Olds (1777–1848), American Congregationalist minister
- George Olds (1853–1931), American academic administrator
- Glenn Olds (1921–2006), American academic administrator and politician
- Henry Oldys born Olds (1859–1925), American ornithologist
- Ian Olds, American film director
- Ikaika Olds, American politician
- Irving S. Olds (1887–1963), American lawyer and philanthropist
- James Olds (1922–1976), American psychologist and neuroscientist
- James Olds (bass) (born 1986), Australian opera singer
- James Olds (rugby league) (born 1991), Welsh rugby league player
- Jennifer Miksis-Olds, American marine scientist
- Leland Olds (1890–1960), American economist
- Lewis P. Olds (fl. 1869–1877), American lawyer, politician, and diplomat
- Linda Olds (born 1946), American psychologist
- Murray Olds, Australian sports journalist and broadcaster
- Ollie Olds (born 1993), Welsh rugby league footballer
- Peter Olds (1944–2023), New Zealand poet
- Ransom E. Olds (1864–1950), American automobile industry pioneer and namesake of the former Oldsmobile and REO brands
- Robert Olds (1896–1943), general officer in the United States Army Air Forces
- Robert E. Olds (1875–1932), American diplomat and lawyer
- Robin Olds (1922–2007), American fighter pilot
- Sharon Olds (born 1942), American poet
- Shelley Olds (born 1980), American racing cyclist
- Wally Olds (1949–2009), American ice hockey player
- Walter Olds (1846–1925), American judge
- Wyatt Olds (born 1999), American baseball player
- W. B. Olds (1874–1948), American composer and scholar

== See also ==
- Old (surname)
