= Horace M. Wade =

American general

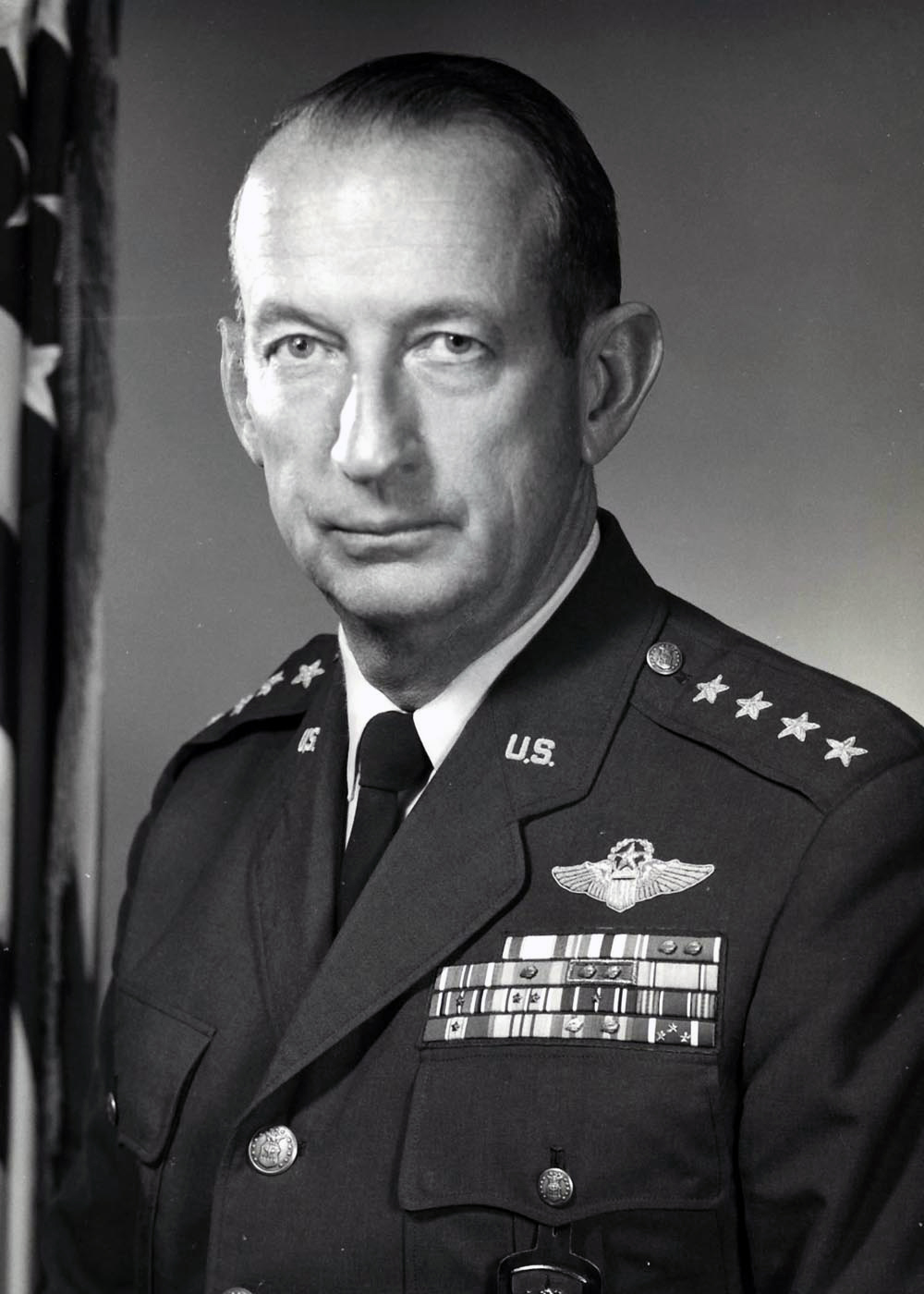
- Official portrait
- Born: March 12, 1916; Magnolia, Arkansas
- Died: June 14, 2001 (aged 85); Tucson, Arizona
- Military career
- Allegiance: United States
- Branch: United States Air Force
- Service years: 1937–1973
- Rank: General
- Commands: 29th Bombardment Group; 301st Bombardment Wing; Fourth Allied Tactical Air Force, Allied Command Europe; Chief of Staff, Supreme Headquarters Allied Powers Europe; Vice Chief of Staff of the United States Air Force; Eighth Air Force; United States Air Forces in Europe
- Conflicts: World War II; Cold War; Vietnam War

Horace Milton Wade (March 12, 1916 – June 14, 2001) was a former general in the United States Air Force and a former Vice Chief of Staff of the United States Air Force.

== Biography ==
=== Early life ===
Wade was born in 1916, in Magnolia, Arkansas. After completing high school in Wortham, Texas, he returned to Arkansas, and graduated from the Magnolia Agricultural and Mechanical Junior College (now known as Southern Arkansas University) in 1936. His military career began in 1934 when he became a member of Company D, 153rd Infantry Regiment, Arkansas National Guard. He entered the Army Air Corps Flying School at Randolph Field in Texas in 1937. Upon graduating and receiving his wings, in October 1938, he was commissioned as a second lieutenant, Air Corps Reserve, U.S. Army.

=== Early career ===
Upon completion of flying training, he was assigned to the 11th Bombardment Squadron, 7th Bombardment Group, Hamilton Field, California, and in December 1941, was deployed with this unit to the Southwest Pacific. He also served in the China Burma India and Mediterranean and Middle East Theaters of operations, accumulating 36 combat missions in B-17 Flying Fortress and B-24 Liberator Theaters before returning to the United States in 1943.

After a short tour as commander of the 29th Bombardment Group, Gowen Field, Idaho, and after a few months as a tactical air inspector for the Second Air Force, he was transferred, in July 1944, to the War Department, General Staff. In March 1946 he was assigned to Headquarters Air Transport Command as deputy chief of staff.

In February 1948 he received his bachelor of science degree in business administration from the University of Arkansas. He then joined the Strategic Air Command in August 1949 and served with the 5th Strategic Reconnaissance Wing at Mountain Home Air Force Base in Idaho, and the 91st Strategic Reconnaissance Wing at Barksdale Air Force Base in Louisiana, before being named commander of the 301st Bombardment Wing at Barksdale in February 1951.

He completed the National War College in June 1955 and was assigned as director of personnel, Headquarters Strategic Air Command, Offutt Air Force Base, Nebraska. In the summer of 1959, he was designated the commander of the 4310th Air Division, Nouasseur Air Base, Morocco, and in October 1961, was assigned as deputy commander, Eighth Air Force at Westover Air Force Base in Massachusetts. In August 1962 he returned to The Pentagon to serve as the assistant deputy chief of staff, plans and programs, Headquarters United States Air Force.

=== Later career ===
On December 1, 1964, Wade was named commander of the Eighth Air Force at Westover Air Force Base, and was promoted to the grade of lieutenant general. In August 1966, he was again returned to Air Force headquarters, this time as deputy chief of staff for personnel. On August 1, 1968, he was designated as commander in chief, United States Air Forces in Europe, Wiesbaden, Germany, and concurrently as commander, Fourth Allied Tactical Air Force, Allied Command Europe, and was promoted to general. In February 1969 he was appointed chief of staff, Supreme Headquarters Allied Powers Europe.

Wade became Vice Chief of Staff of the United States Air Force, on May 1, 1972. At some point the United States Air Force named an award after him.

Over his career as a pilot, he maintained his proficiency in multijet aircraft and has more than 8,450 hours of flying time.

=== Death ===
Wade died on June 14, 2001.

== Awards ==
Awards earned during his career:

- Air Force Distinguished Service Medal with an oak leaf cluster
- Silver Star
- Legion of Merit with two oak leaf clusters
- Distinguished Flying Cross
- Air Medal with an oak leaf cluster

Arkansas Aviation Historical Society inducted Wade into the Arkansas Aviation Hall of Fame in 1999.

== See also ==
- List of commanders of USAFE
