= 4310 =

4310 may refer to:

- a year in the 5th millennium
- 4310th Air Division
- 4310 Strömholm, an asteroid
- KAMAZ 4310 6x6 Chassis truck
