= Old (surname) =

Old is a surname. Notable people with the surname include:

- Alan Old (born 1945), English rugby union player
- Archie J. Old Jr. (1906–1984), United States Air Force officer
- Ashley George Old (1913–2001), British artist
- Ben Old (born 2002), New Zealand footballer
- Chris Old (born 1948), English cricketer
- Dick Old (1922–2007), Australian politician
- Francis Old (1875–1950), Australian politician
- Geoff Old (born 1956), New Zealand rugby union footballer and coach
- Hughes Oliphant Old (1933–2016), American theologian
- Lloyd J. Old (1933–2011), cancer researcher
- Richard Old (1856–1932), English woodcraftsman and model maker
- Steven Old (born 1986), New Zealand footballer
- William E. Old Jr. (1928–1982), American malacologist

== See also ==
- Olde, a list of people with the surname
- Olds (surname)
