= Oussama Belhcen discography =

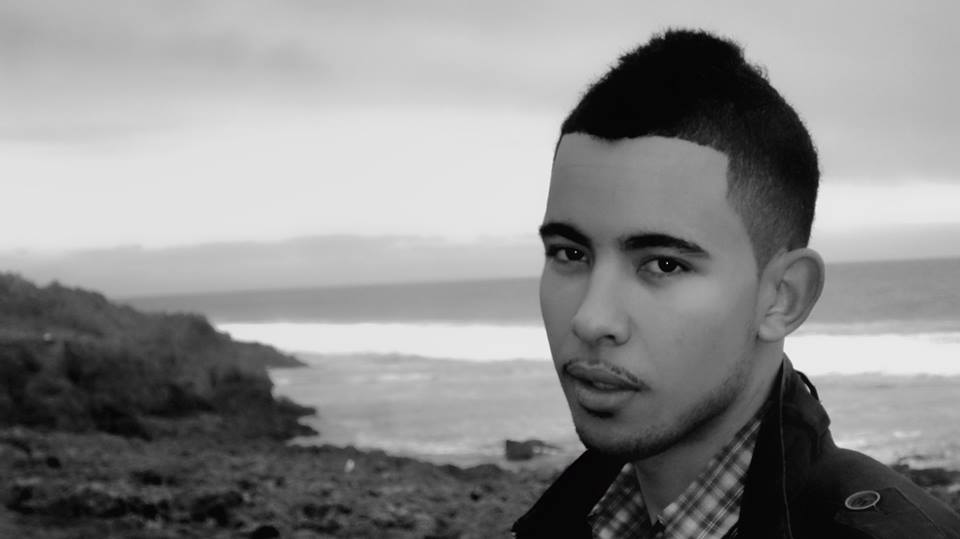
- Studio albums: 3
- Singles: 13
- Music videos: 3

The discography of Oussama Belhcen, a Moroccan pop singer and songwriter, contains three studio album and six singles.

Belhcen debut album, Ana With was released by L-Boyz Record in December 2008. The first single, "Nhar Ela Nhar", had reached number fourth on the Soundclick chart in the Moroccan area in March 2008. The second self-titled album Ryan Belhcen; was released in 2010.

In March 2010, Belhscen released the track "Baghi know Meak" as the lead single from the upcoming album, Dayman. The single, debuted at number-one on Listening and Downloading in Reverbnation & Soundclick by the Moroccan location. Second single, "Neish Dhak" was released in January 2011 and debuted at number-one; featuring back vocals from Leyla Queen. Then the third single "Mehtaj Lik" released in April 2011 and reached number two in Reverbnation by Moroccan location, in addition the single backs to be released by a music video on 19 March. And the fourth single "Khallini Nebghik" released on 21 February, and reached number-one in Soundclick and number six in Reverbnation by Moroccan location. The album will be released in summer 2012.

Belhcen also recorded the song "Ana Huwa Ana" with the Moroccan rappers Aklo and Ibrahim B, which it co-written, composed and produced by him. Oussama has also co-written songs for many rappers and singers coming from Larache.

In 2013, he released a final single titled "Meghalaya" featuring the rapper Aklo on April, then for few months he decided to make a stop for his musical career, for some unknown personal reasons.

After he abandoned his music career for nearly two years, earlier in 2015, Oussama revealed on his Facebook page that he will come back to the music industry, and in a talk to a local press Launcher he said that his upcoming single will be titled "Kolshi Bin Yeddi" and he also said that he will return with his real name "Oussama Belhcen" instead of his former stage name "Ryan Belhscen". On 25 May 2015 he released his single "Kolshi Bin Yeddi" then the second single "Nehar Lik Weather Alik" on 27 November 2015.

== Studio albums ==
As Ryan Belhsen

Title	Album details	Producers
Ana Wnti	Released: 20 December 2008; Label: L-Boyz Record; Formats: digital download	Fahd Lil
Ryan Belhsen	Released: 10 October 2010; Label: L-Boyz Record; Formats: CD, digital download	Fahd Lil, Oussama Belhcen
Dayman	Released: 3 June 2012; Label: L-Boyz Record; Formats: CD, digital download	Oussama Belhcen, Fahd Lil

== Singles ==
As Ryan Belhsen

Title	Year
Nhar Ela Nhar	2008
Kolshi Lik	2010
Baghi Nkon Meak	2010
Mehtaj Lik	2011
Khallini Nebghik	2012
Meghribiya	2013

As Oussama Belhcen

Title	Year
Kolshi Bin Yeddi	2015
Nehar Lik Wenhar Alik	2015
Elmostahil Makainsh Febali	2016
Ghatelqani Hdak	2016
Bali Dima Meak	2016
Ida Bghiti Shi Hed (If You Love Someone)	2016
Khaina	2016

== Mixtapes ==
Title	Album details	Producers
Dayman (The Mixtape)	Released: 30 October 2011; Label: L-Boyz Record; Formats: digital download	Oussama Belhcen, Lil-G, Fahd Lil

== Music videos ==
Year	Song	Director
2012	"Mehtaj Lik"	Abdurrahmane Assorhani (Sarhanihow)
2013	"Kibghik"	Abdurrahmane Assorhani (Sarhanihow)
2016	"Khaina"	Ayoub Moumni

== Other appearances ==
Year	Song	Album	Notes
2009	"No Life"	"NorthSideBoyz"	Song written by Belhsen and Guest appearance on NorthSideBoyz's album, including him, Lil-G & Jay-M.
2010	"Nhar Jdid"	"Nhar Jdid"	Guest appearance on MC-Simo's album. Featuring Joe.
2010	"Loghz 7yati"	"Mashi 3adi"	Songs written by Belhsen and Guest appearance on Big Nass's album
2010	"M3ak"	"Bghit Nshof"	Songs written by Belhsen and Guest appearance on Aklo & Ibra-X's album.
2010	"Rdite Bel9adar"	"Bghit Nshof"	Songs written by Belhsen and Guest appearance on Aklo & Ibra-X's album.
2010	"Say7at Le3dab"	"Bghit Nshof"	Songs written by Belhsen and Guest appearance on Aklo & Ibra-X's album.
2011	"I'm Good Hamdullah"		Guest appearance on Lil-G's single.
