= Olds =

Olds may refer to:

== People ==
- The olds, a jocular and irreverent online nickname for older adults
- Olds (surname)

== Places ==
- Olds, Alberta, Canada
- Olds, Iowa, United States
- Olds Peak, Antarctica

== Other uses ==
- F. E. Olds, an American brass musical instrument manufacturing company
- Olds College, in Olds, Alberta
- Oldsmobile, an American automobile brand

== See also ==
- Old (disambiguation)
- Olde, a list of people with the surname
