= Old =

Old, OLD, or the old may refer to:

== Places ==
- Old, Baranya, Hungary
- Old, Northamptonshire, England
- Old Street station, a railway and tube station in London (station code OLD)
- OLD, IATA code for Old Town Municipal Airport and Seaplane Base, Old Town, Maine, United States

== People ==
- Old (surname)
- List of people known as the Old

== Music ==
- OLD (band), a grindcore/industrial metal group
- Old (Danny Brown album), a 2013 album by Danny Brown
- Old (Starflyer 59 album), a 2003 album by Starflyer 59
- "Old" (song), a 1995 song by Machine Head
- "Old", a 1982 song by Dexys Midnight Runners from Too-Rye-Ay
- Old LP, a 2019 album by That Dog

== Other uses ==
- Old (film), a 2021 American thriller film
- Oxford Latin Dictionary
- Online dating
- Over-Locknut Distance (or Dimension), a measurement of a bicycle wheel and frame
- Old age
- Ye olde, a pseudo-Early Modern English phrase meaning "the old"

== See also ==
- Olde, a list of people with the surname
- Olds (disambiguation)
