= William Olds =

William Olds may refer to:

- Bill Olds (William Henry Olds, born 1951), American professional football player
- W. B. Olds (1874–1948), American composer and scholar
