= RMAF =

The acronym RMAF may refer to:

- The Royal Malaysian Air Force
- The Royal Moroccan Air Force
- The Ramon Magsaysay Award Foundation
