= Colleen Mouw =

Oceanographer

- Education: University of Rhode Island
- Scientific career
- Thesis: Bio-optical and remote sensing investigation of phytoplankton community size structure (2009)

Colleen Beckmann Mouw is a professor at the University of Rhode Island known for her work on phytoplankton ecology and increasing retention of women in oceanography.

== Education and career ==
Mouw received a B.S. from Western Michigan University in 2000, and an M.S. (2003) and a Ph.D. (2009) from the University of Rhode Island. Following her Ph.D. she was a postdoctoral investigator at the University of Wisconsin-Madison, until she moved to Michigan Technological University in 2012. In 2016, she moved back to the University of Rhode Island.

== Research ==
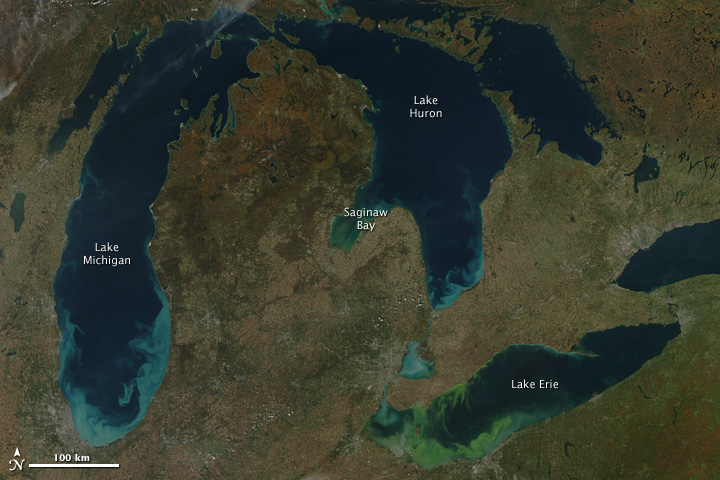
October 2011 algal bloom visible from space using NASA's Aqua satellite.

Mouw's early research used satellite data to study phytoplankton from space, with a particular focus on the challenges in using satellite data in coastal and open ocean environments. In the Great Lakes, Mouw used a combination of optical measurements and satellite data to characterize phytoplankton blooms. In 2011 Mouw observed that a combination of rain and the increased presence of zebra mussels may have allowed higher growth of the phytoplankton Microcystis, culminating in an algal bloom in Lake Erie that was visible from space. Mouw has defined the impact of phytoplankton size on the flux of carbon in the ocean, and worked with Jennifer Miksis-Olds to link fin whale behavior with environmental conditions. She has also examined the consequences of construction in the coastal environment using satellite data, and tracked harmful algal blooms using flow cytometry.

Mouw is co-lead at the MPOWIR program (Mentoring Physical Oceanography Women to Increase Retention), and has evaluated the impact of programs to retain women in physical oceanography MPOWIR.

== Selected publications ==
- Mouw, Colleen B.; Greb, Steven; Aurin, Dirk; DiGiacomo, Paul M.; Lee, Zhongping; Twardowski, Michael; Binding, Caren; Hu, Chuanmin; Ma, Ronghua; Moore, Timothy; Moses, Wesley; Craig, Susanne E. (1 April 2015). "Aquatic color radiometry remote sensing of coastal and inland waters: Challenges and recommendations for future satellite missions". Remote Sensing of Environment. 160: 15–30. Bibcode:2015RSEnv.160...15M. doi:10.1016/j.rse.2015.02.001. ISSN 0034-4257.
- Bracher, Astrid; Bouman, Heather A.; Brewin, Robert J. W.; Bricaud, Annick; Brotas, Vanda; Ciotti, Aurea M.; Clementson, Lesley; Devred, Emmanuel; Di Cicco, Annalisa; Dutkiewicz, Stephanie; Hardman-Mountford, Nick J.; Hickman, Anna E.; Hieronymi, Martin; Hirata, Takafumi; Losa, Svetlana N.; Mouw, Colleen B.; Organelli, Emanuele; Raitsos, Dionysios E.; Uitz, Julia; Vogt, Meike; Wolanin, Aleksandra (2017). "Obtaining Phytoplankton Diversity from Ocean Color: A Scientific Roadmap for Future Development". Frontiers in Marine Science. 4: 55. doi:10.3389/fmars.2017.00055. hdl:10871/38254. ISSN 2296-7745.
- Mouw, Colleen B.; Hardman-Mountford, Nick J.; Alvain, Séverine; Bracher, Astrid; Brewin, Robert J. W.; Bricaud, Annick; Ciotti, Aurea M.; Devred, Emmanuel; Fujiwara, Amane; Hirata, Takafumi; Hirawake, Toru; Kostadinov, Tihomir S.; Roy, Shovonlal; Uitz, Julia (2017). "A Consumer's Guide to Satellite Remote Sensing of Multiple Phytoplankton Groups in the Global Ocean". Frontiers in Marine Science. 4: 41. doi:10.3389/fmars.2017.00041. hdl:20.500.12210/72074. ISSN 2296-7745.
- Mouw, Colleen B.; Yoder, James A. (7 December 2010). "Optical determination of phytoplankton size composition from global SeaWiFS imagery". Journal of Geophysical Research. 115 (C12). Bibcode:2010JGRC..11512018M. doi:10.1029/2010jc006337. ISSN 0148-0227.

== Awards and honors ==
In 2016, Mouw received a Presidential Early Career Award for Scientists and Engineers (PECASE). In 2019, Western Michigan University honored Mouw with an Alumni Achievement Award.
