= Oussama Belhcen =

Musical artist

OUBEL
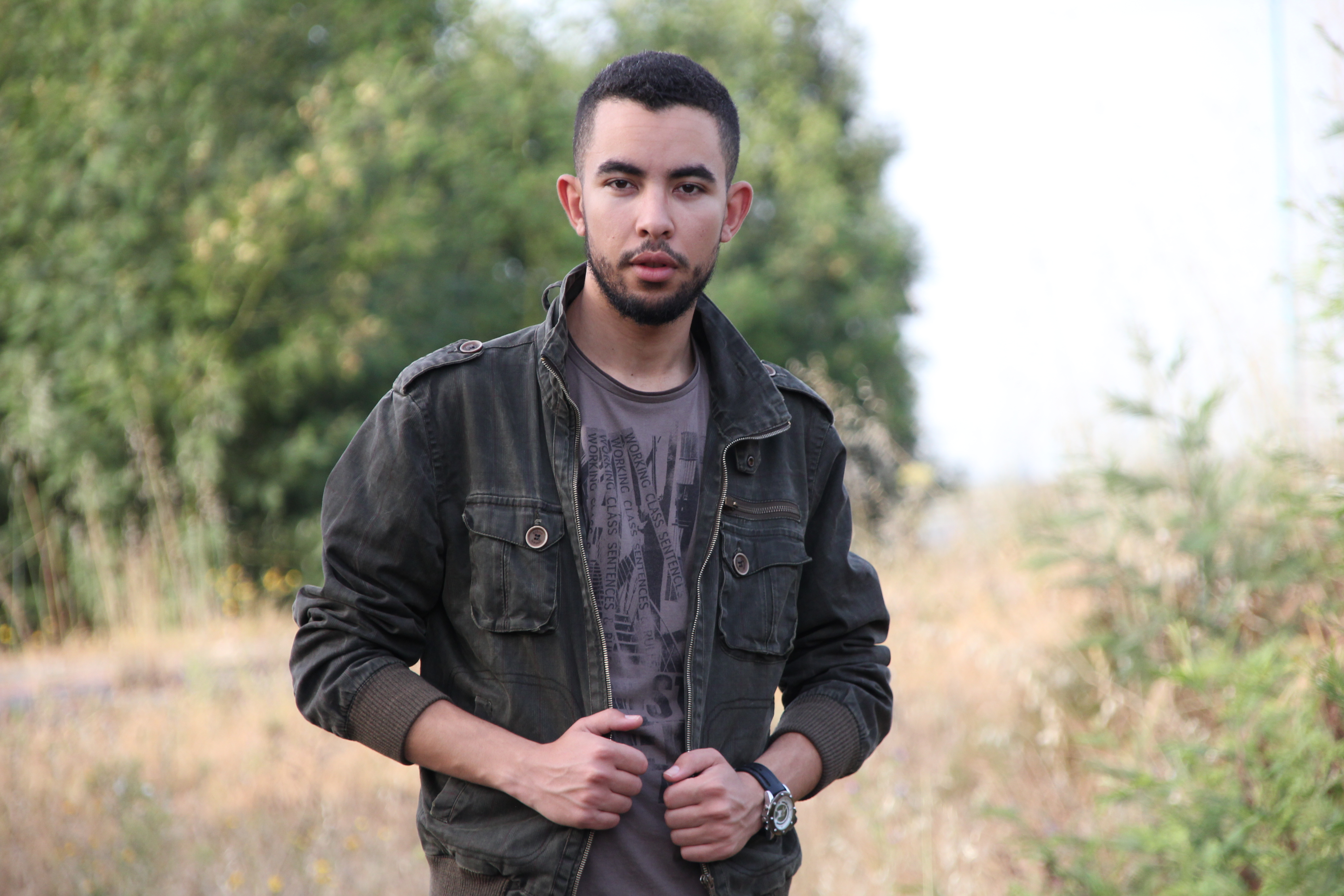
- OUBEL

Background information
- Born: March 18, 1991 (age 34) United States Naval Communications Station Sidi Yahya El Gharb, Morocco
- Origin: Larache, Morocco
- Genres: Moroccan pop, R&B, pop, hip Hop, Arabic Pop
- Occupation(s): Singer, songwriter, record producer
- Instruments: voice, keyboard
- Years active: 2006–2013, 2015-present
- Labels: New Lixus Entertainment
- Website: www.oubel.net

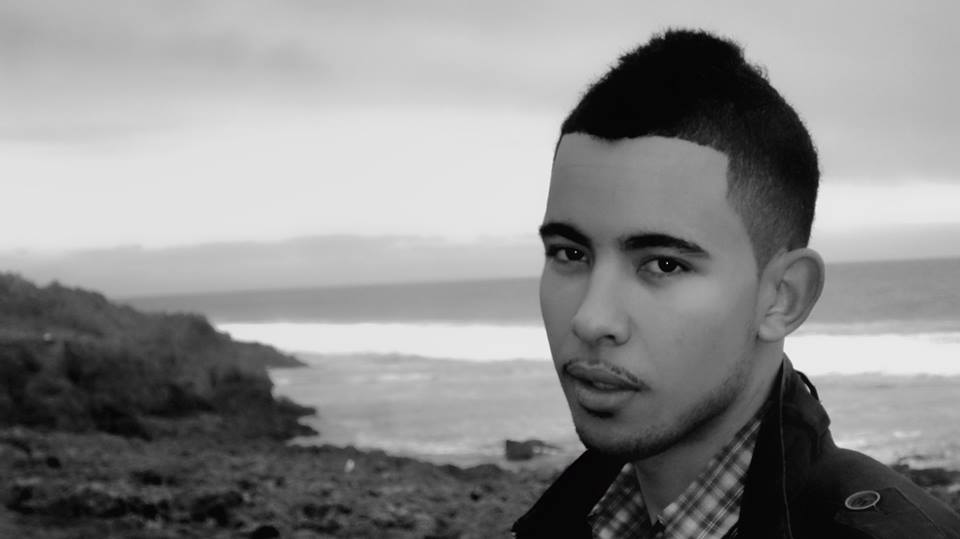
Oussama Belhcen

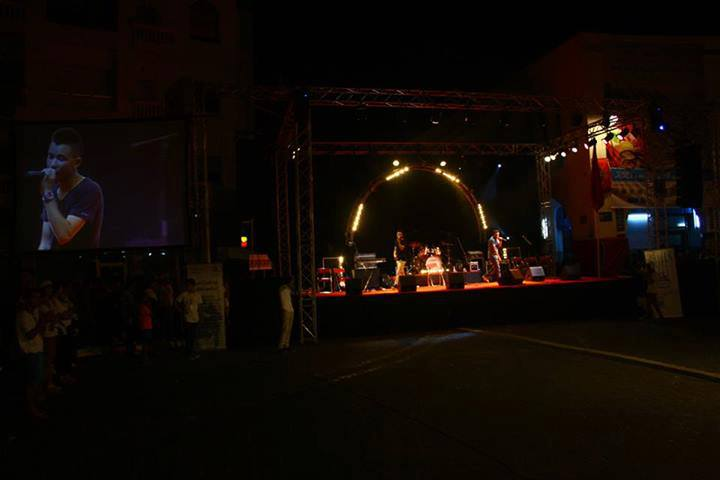
Oussama Belhcen performing at Festival du théâtre et des arts populaires de Larache 2013

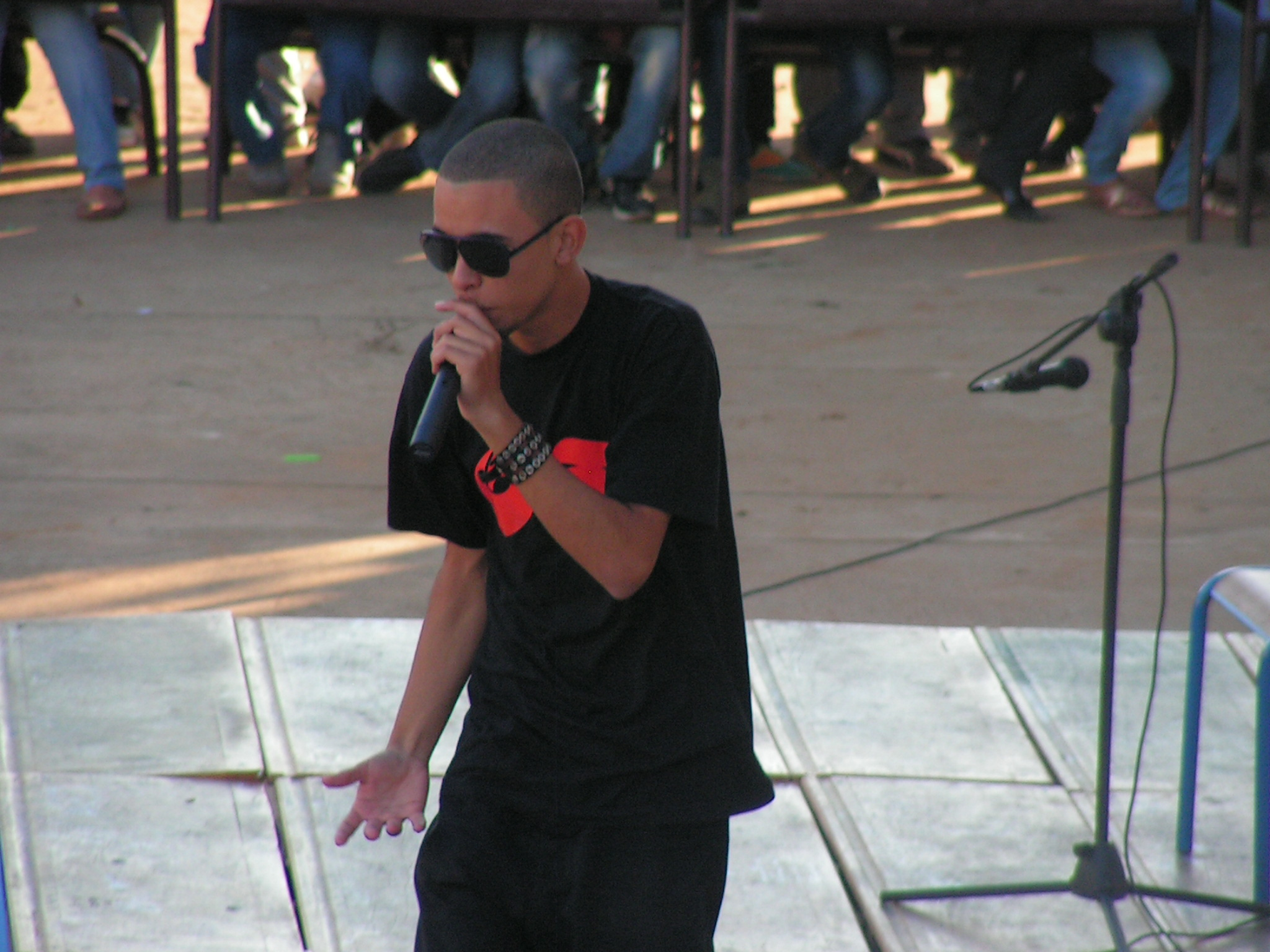
Performing as Ryan Belhsen at Benchakroun in November 2010

OUBEL or Oussama Belhcen (Arabic: أسامة بالحسن, born March 18, 1991) is a Moroccan pop and R&B singer, songwriter and producer. He started his career in 2006 and sings in Arabic, English and French. After a short career with the Moroccan urban hip hop group MafiaFlow, he has had a solo career with three albums (Ana Wnti (2008), Ryan Belhsen (2010) and Dayman (2012), an EP and a number of singles. He is signed to New Lixus Entertainment label.

== Career ==
He was born in Sidi Yahya El Gharb where his father served with the Royal Moroccan Air Force. Oussama Belhcen was attracted very early to the American culture. At age 9 the family moved to the city Larache on the Atlantic Ocean, where launched his musical career and at age 15 forming a hip hop / rap group MafiaFlow with four of his schoolmates. After one album, they separated.

Adopting the Americanized stage name Ryan Belhsen and after one year of separation of the rap group, MafiaFlow, he released his first R&B song "Nhar Ela Nhar" (Day on Day), which was the debut single from his debut solo album Ana Wnti in 2008. On October 10, 2010, he released his self-titled album Ryan Belhsen. He released a number of tracks in English like "Whatcha Gonna Do", "Never Stop This Love", "It's Over". With his third album Dayman (Always) he reverted to his birth name Oussama Belhcen. His style is R&B music "Gharbi" (occidental) style. He performed at various music festivals getting more fame. In 2015, he returned with his singles "Kolshi Bin Yeddi", "Nehar Lik Wenhar Alik" and in 2016 with "Elmostahil Makainsh Febali".

== Discography ==
=== Albums ===
- 2008: Ana Wnti
- 2010: Ryan Belhsen
- 2012: Dayman

=== Mixtapes ===
- 2011: Dayman (The Mixtape)

=== Singles ===
- 2008: "Nhar Ela Nhar"
- 2011: "Mehtaj Lik"
- 2012: "Fjenbi"
- 2013: "Kinghik"
- 2013: "Meghribiya" feat. Aklo
- 2015: "Kolshi Bin Yeddi"
- 2015: "Nhar Lik Wenhar Alik"
- 2016: "Elmostahil Makainsh Febali"
- 2016: "Ghatelqani Hdak"
- 2016: "Bali Dima Meak"
- 2016: "Ida Bghiti Shi Hed (If You Love Someone)"
- 2016: "Khaina"
- 2016: "Bzaf 3lihom"

=== Music videos ===
- 2016: Khaina
