= Bassatine Air Base =

Bassatine Air Base Second Royal Air Force Base
- IATA: MEK; ICAO: GMFM

Summary
- Airport type: Military
- Operator: Royal Moroccan Air Force
- Location: Meknes, Morocco
- Elevation AMSL: 1,890 ft (580 m)
- Coordinates: 33°52′45″N 005°30′54″W

Map
- Location of air base in Morocco

Runways
Direction	Length		Surface
Direction	m	ft	Surface
09/27	2,820	9,252	Asphalt
08/26	1,957	6,420	Asphalt
- Source: DAFIF

Bassatine Air Base (IATA: MEK, ICAO: GMFM) is a military air base in Meknes, Morocco. It is also known as the Second Royal Air Force Base, operated by the Royal Moroccan Air Force.

== Facilities ==
The airport resides at an elevation of 1,890 feet (576 m) above mean sea level. It has two asphalt paved runways: 09/27 measures 2,820 by 50 metres (9,252 ft × 164 ft) and 08/26 is 1,957 by 50 metres (6,421 ft × 164 ft).
