= 1956 USAF Boeing B-47 disappearance =

Cold War disappearance of a nuclear-equipped Boeing B-47

1956 B-47 disappearance
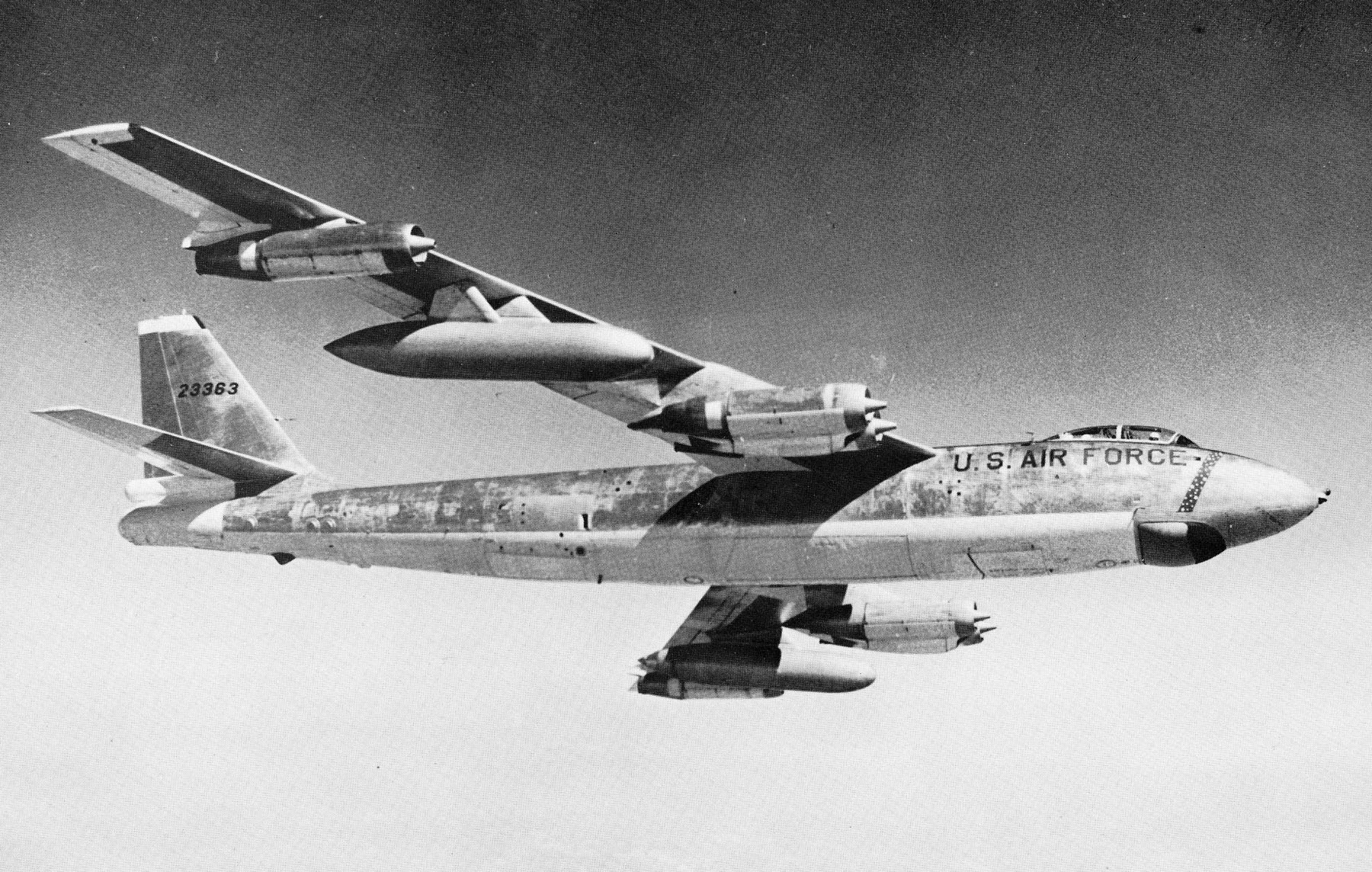
- A B-47E Stratojet similar to the missing aircraft

Missing aircraft
- Date: 10 March 1956
- Summary: Disappearance over water; presumed accident
- Site: Mediterranean Sea

Aircraft
- Aircraft type: Boeing B-47E Stratojet
- Operator: United States Air Force
- Registration: 52-534
- Flight origin: MacDill Air Force Base, Florida, United States
- Destination: Ben Guerir Air Base, Morocco
- Crew: 3
- Fatalities: 3 (presumed)
- Injuries: Unknown
- Survivors: Unknown

The 1956 B-47 disappearance was a Cold War aviation incident in which a United States Air Force Boeing B-47 Stratojet vanished over the Mediterranean Sea on 10 March 1956 while en route from MacDill Air Force Base in Florida to Ben Guerir Air Base in Morocco. The aircraft, carrying three crew members, failed to make contact with a KC-97 tanker during a scheduled aerial refuelling. No wreckage or remains were recovered, and the crew were later declared dead.

At the time of the disappearance, the bomber was transporting two sealed capsules containing nuclear pits, but was not carrying any complete nuclear weapons, making a nuclear detonation impossible. The accident is listed in U.S. Department of Defense summaries as a “Broken Arrow”.

== Flight ==
The B-47E, serial number 52-534 and call sign Inkspot 59, assigned to the 369th Bomb Squadron of the 306th Bombardment Wing was on a scheduled non-stop deployment flight from MacDill Air Force Base to Ben Guerir Air Base as part of routine Strategic Air Command bomber rotations to North Africa.

The B-47 successfully completed the first of two scheduled aerial refueling over the Mediterranean. For the second refueling, the bomber descended through thick cloud to 14,000 feet (4,300 m) approximately 90 miles (140 km) southwest of Oran. Visibility was poor. Upon entering the cloud layer, all radio contact with the accompanying KC-97 tanker abruptly ceased and the aircraft failed to arrive at the refueling point. No further signals were received, and the bomber was declared missing.

The aircraft was transporting two sealed nuclear pits inside their protective containers. These components cannot produce a nuclear yield unless integrated into a complete weapon system, requiring high explosives, not present on the flight.

== Aftermath ==
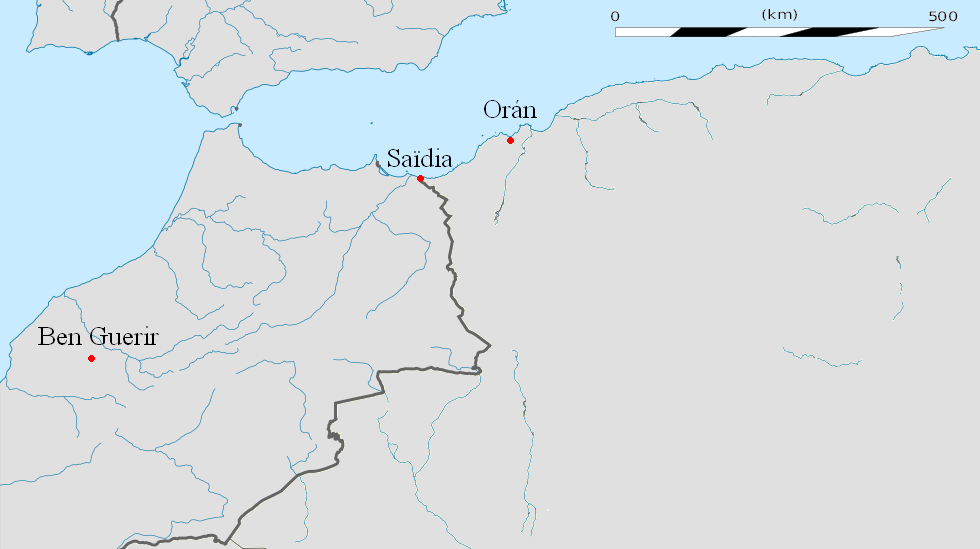
The location of Ben Guerir Air Base, Saïdia and Oran

Aircraft last known position was over/near the Mediterranean Sea, north of Marsa Ben M'Hidi (Port-Say), an Algerian coastal village near the Moroccan frontier. A French press report suggested an in-flight explosion northeast of Saïdia, although no evidence or debris was found. Weather conditions at the time included extensive cloud cover, which hampered visual search efforts.

Despite widespread air and sea searches, no wreckage, bodies or capsule containers were ever recovered and the location of the aircraft’s disappearance could not be determined.

The crew were later declared dead:

- Captain Robert H. Hodgin, 31, aircraft commander
- Captain Gordon M. Insley, 32, observer
- Second Lieutenant Ronald L. Kurtz, 22, pilot

The incident remains one of several Cold War cases in which U.S. military aircraft carrying nuclear components were lost at sea with no recovery.

== See also ==
- List of people who disappeared mysteriously at sea
- 1968 Thule Air Base B-52 crash
- 1966 Palomares incident
