= Susan E. Parks =

Marine scientist

Susan Parks is an ecologist at Syracuse University known for her research on acoustic signaling and the impact of ambient noise on communication in marine mammals.

== Education and career ==
Parks obtained a B.A. in Biology from Cornell University (1998) and a Ph.D. in Biological Oceanography from the Massachusetts Institute of Technology and Woods Hole Oceanographic Institution (2003). Following her time in Woods Hole, Parks was a postdoctoral investigator at Cornell University before joining the faculty at Pennsylvania State University. Parks is currently an associate professor of Biology at Syracuse University.

== Research ==
At a young age, Parks' father introduced her to recordings of whale sounds and, in a 2010 interview, Parks describes the connection between this moment and an undergraduate animal behavior class that led her to a research project with frogs and ultimately her Ph.D. research on right whales. During her Ph.D., Parks used an historical archive of whale sounds and determined that right whale calls increased in volume when ambient noise levels increased. Parks has also used tags temporarily placed on right whales to study their ecology and research by Holly Root-Gutteridge, a postdoctoral investigator working with Parks, has revealed that right whale songs change over a whale's lifespan. By tracking the 'gunshot' sound made by right whales, Parks and colleagues determined that right whales use Roseway Basin, a region of the Scotian Shelf, from August to November as an area for breeding.

Through the use of sound, Parks has also examined the connection between higher temperatures and sound in katydids, traffic noise and frogs, and seals that may not be loud enough to overcome noise levels from human activities. Parks, Jennifer Miksis-Olds, and Samuel Denes have used sound to define the bounds of biological habitats. Whales vary the noises they make and Parks' research has described the soft sounds used by mother and calf pairs as 'whispers' which may avoid the unwanted attention of predators. The clock-like sounds in humpback whales could be a signal to nearby whales about the presence of food or a means to get the whales' prey to come out of the sand. After the 9/11 attacks, an unplanned collaboration between Parks, Rosalind Rolland, and a team of researchers concluded that a short-term reduction in ship noise altered hormone levels in whales.

In addition to her research, Parks mentors women in science and in 2016 Parks said she "...wanted to be a senior scientist in the field to provide young women an example of a female role model."

== Awards ==
- Young Investigator Award, Office of Naval Research (2008)
- Presidential Early Career Awards for Scientists and Engineers (2009)
- Kavli Frontier Fellow, National Academy of Science (2010)
