= Ben Guerir Air Base =

Royal Moroccan Air Force base

- IATA: none; ICAO: GMMG

Summary
- Airport type: Military
- Operator: Royal Moroccan Air Force
- Location: Ben Guerir, Morocco
- Elevation AMSL: 430 m / 1,400 ft
- Coordinates: 32°7′50″N 7°54′39″W

Map

Runways
Direction	Length		Surface
Direction	m	ft	Surface
18/36	4,182	13,720	Asphalt

Ben Guerir Air Base is a Royal Moroccan Air Force base in the Marrakesh-Safi region, located about 58 kilometres (36 mi) north of Marrakesh, near the town of Ben Guerir. It previously served as a United States Air Force base and Transatlantic Abort Landing (TAL) site for the Space Shuttle.

== History ==
Ben Guerir was established in 1951 by the U.S. Strategic Air Command (SAC), as one of five bases constructed in what was then French North Africa for SAC during a "crash program" which began in 1950. The base was located to allow for the rapid deployment of nuclear-armed Boeing B-47 Stratojets, without requiring aerial refueling, Boeing KC-97 Stratofreighters were also deployed from the base.

In 1956, the entire RB-47E force operated by the 91st Strategic Reconnaissance Wing's 322nd, 323rd and 324th Strategic Reconnaissance Squadrons spent 90 days at Ben Guerir on temporary duty assignment. SAC occupied the base until 1963. The base operating unit was the 3926th Air Base, later "Combat Support" Group, assigned to the 5th Air Division and later to the 4310th Air Division.

The base was designated as a Transoceanic Abort Landing (TAL) site for the Space Shuttle in July 1988, replacing the former TAL site at Casablanca. The site was chosen largely for its location near the nominal ground track of the shuttle orbiter for a mid-range inclination launch, meaning a diversion to the TAL site would require minimal use of fuel. Ben Guerir last served as a TAL site in June 2002, for STS-111, which landed at Edwards Air Force Base at the conclusion of its flight. The base was deactivated in 2005, after supporting 83 shuttle missions.

The base is home to an Escadre de Chasse (Fighter Wing), with three squadrons of General Dynamics F-16C/D Fighting Falcons: the "Falcon", "Spark", and "Viper" squadrons.

== Facilities ==
Ben Guerir has one runway oriented in a North-South direction. It is 61 metres (200 ft) wide, with 7.6 m (25 ft) shoulders, and is 4,182 m (13,720 ft) long, with a 305 m (1,000 ft) underrun and a 762 m (2,500 ft) compacted dirt overrun, for a total length of 4,791 m (15,720 ft). During renovations made by NASA in 1988, the runway was equipped with shuttle-unique landing aids, including a microwave landing system and Tactical Air Navigation (TACAN) system.

As on 2021, the Moroccan Air Force is upgrading Ben Guerir Air Base to support its acquisition of F-16 Fighting Falcon aircraft.

== See also ==
- 1956 B-47 disappearance
