= Royal Moroccan Air Force =

Aerial warfare branch of the Moroccan Armed Forces

- القوات الجوية الملكية المغربية (Arabic)
- Badge of the Royal Moroccan Air Force
- Founded: 19 November 1956; 69 years ago
- Country: Morocco
- Type: Air force
- Role: Aerial warfare
- Size: 13,000 personnel
- Part of: Royal Moroccan Armed Forces
- Equipment: 400+ aircraft
- Engagements: Sand War; Yom Kippur War; Western Sahara War; War against the Islamic State; Saudi Arabian-led intervention in Yemen

Commanders
- Commander-in-Chief: King Mohammed VI
- Commander of the Air Force: General Mohammed Gadih

Insignia
- Roundel

- Fin flash

Aircraft flown
- Fighter: F-16 Fighting Falcon, Northrop F-5, Mirage F1
- Attack helicopter: SA 342, AH-64E Apache
- Multirole helicopter: CH-47, SA 330, AB205
- Reconnaissance: C-130
- Trainer: Beechcraft Super King Air, T-6C, Alpha Jet E+, F-5F
- Transport: C-130H, CN-235M, C-27J
- Tanker: KC-130H

The Royal Moroccan Air Force (Arabic: القوات الجوية الملكية) is the aerial branch of the Moroccan Armed Forces.

== History ==
The Moroccan Air Force was formed on 14 May 1956 as the Sherifian Royal Aviation (Aviation Royale Chérifienne).

Its modern installations and bases were inherited from France-Meknes and Rabat in tandem with the United States, Marrakech, Kenitra, Ben Guerir, Boulhault, Nouasseur, and Sidi Slimane), and later Spain (Laayoune). In the 1950s and 1960s, American aircraft were deployed in several of these bases, including nuclear bombers from the Strategic Air Command.

The first aircraft of this newly formed air force were 16 Morane-Saulnier Alcyons, five Max Holste MH.1521 Broussard transport aircraft, one Aérospatiale Alouette II, and one Bell H-13 Sioux.

In 1961, it obtained 12 Mikoyan-Gurevich MiG-17 fighters, two Mikoyan-Gurevich MiG-15UTI trainers and either two or four Ilyushin Il-28 bombers from the Soviet Union. Eight Fouga Magister training aircraft were also received from France.

On 1 February 1964, the Sherifian Royal Aviation changed its name to Royal Air Force (Force Aérienne Royale). Since the 1990s, it has been known as the Forces Royales Air.

The political rift with the Soviet Union pushed Morocco to seek a new ally in the United States, acquiring from the latter six Northrop F-5 combat aircraft (4 single-seat F-5A and 2 two-seat F-5B) and another 20 F-5A and four F-5B in 1966. Around 1962, 10 Douglas C-47 Skytrain and six Fairchild C-119G transport aircraft were acquired. At that time, the helicopter fleet was composed of six Aerospatiale Alouette IIs and four Bell 47s. 12 North American T-6 Texans were used for pilot training; no less than eight T-6Gs and 56 SNJ-4s had been delivered by France, but most of them were in a very poor condition, and written off soon after their delivery. 15 Harvard Mk 4s were also delivered in 1962.

Starting in 1968, Morocco acquired 60 AB205, 25 AB206, two AB212, and nine CH-47C helicopters from Italy. Deliveries lasted until 1977.

The next modernization of the Moroccan Air Force took place just before the Sahara conflict. The first 25 Mirage F1CH fighters were purchased in 1975, together with 38 Aerospatiale Puma helicopters. Six C-130Hs were bought in 1973, and deliveries started in 1974. Modernization of Northrop F-5 Freedom Fighter with improved technology and the purchase of 24 Alpha Jet E would later be undertaken by the RMAF; another modernization of the fleet of Dassault Mirage F1 was achieved in 1996 and 1997.

During the 90s there were plans for purchasing Mirage 2000 or F-16 fighter aircraft, however due to unavailable funding they were not realized. By 2011 the Royal Moroccan Air Force started to modernize its ageing fleet by buying F-16s.

=== Operations ===
==== Sand War ====
The RMAF participated in the Moroccan-Algerian border conflict in 1963 known as Sand War. Its Fairchild C-119s and Douglas C-47s were used to resupply troops, North American T-6s for reconnaissance, and Morane-Saulnier Alcyons for ground attack. MiG-17s were only used sporadically, mostly due to their short range.

==== Yom Kippur War ====
During the Yom Kippur War, a squadron of Royal Moroccan Air Force Northrop F-5As joined the Egyptian 69 Squadron at Tanta on 19 October 1973. At least 14 MiG-17s and also around a dozen of F-5As were deployed. The F-5As arrived after a lengthy trip, via Tunis and Libya, accompanied by Lockheed C-130 Hercules transports that carried spare parts, weapons, and equipment. Moroccans started flying tasked with CAP missions over the Nile Delta. In January 1974 two F-5As armed with AIM-9Bs and 20mm cannons intercepted a pair of Israeli Air Force Mirage IIICJs on a reconnaissance mission. The Israelis turned away once the F-5As were detected, dragging both RMAF fighters behind them. Concerned about a possible ambush by Israeli F-4E Phantom IIs, the Egyptian Air Force ground control ordered both Moroccan fighters to return, replacing them with two EAF MiG-21MFs.

==== Western Sahara War ====
At the beginning of the Western Sahara War, Fouga Magisters (based at Laayoune) and North American T-6 Texans (based at Dakhla) were used for ground support. Later on, the F-5s went into action, to strike POLISARIO targets.

In 1980, construction of the Sahara defensive walls began, consisting of several types of obstacles for infantry and armoured vehicles, such as mine fields and barbed wire. Radars and other electronic sensors were used to detect infiltration attempts, all backed by Quick Intervention Units (Détachements d'Intervention Rapide) able to move to and quickly reinforce attacked outposts along the wall. It was also decided to use Aérospatiale SA 342 Gazelle helicopters with HOT missiles to engage the POLISARIO's armoured vehicles and technicals from outside the range of light anti-aircraft guns. Apart from the ground radars of the Wall, two C-130 Hercules equipped with SLARs were also used for the detection of enemy units. However, the first portion of the wall, completed in 1982, protected only the area considered as “useful” for Morocco's political and economic interests, that is, the capital Laayoune, the religious center Smara, and the phosphate fields of Bou Craa.

After the loss of nine F-5As during combat operations against the POLISARIO, 16 F-5Es and 4 F-5Fs were acquired in October 1979. The main problem that faced Moroccan fighter-bombers in Western Sahara was their insufficient range over the vast battlefield of the Sahara desert. To address it, in 1982, a Boeing 707-138B was fitted with Beech hose units at the wingtips for refueling. Two Lockheed KC-130Hs were also delivered, and all of the F-5Es were modified with aerial refueling probes.

In December 1977, the Royal Moroccan Air Force started receiving its first Mirage F1CHs. Even though the Mirage F1CH was designed as an interceptor, it was used almost exclusively for ground attack in the war against the POLISARIO. The last of a total of 30 Mirage F1CHs were received in December 1979. Additionally, 20 Mirage F1EHs (including six equipped with in-flight refuelling probes) were delivered between December 1979 and July 1982.

Together with the F-5E/Fs, the FRA decided to buy a total of 24 OV-10As from the United States Marine Corps. However, only the first six aircraft were delivered. They were mostly used in a maritime patrol role and for reconnaissance due to their inefficiency in combat.

==== Intervention against ISIL ====
In late 2014 Morocco sent F-16s into combat against ISIL in Iraq and Syria. The aircraft were based in the UAE. This was the first deployment for the jets since Morocco purchased them in 2011.

=== Modernization in the 21st century ===
The Royal Moroccan Air Force started a progressive modernization program of its ageing fleet and their technical and operational capacities.

==== F-5 upgrades ====
Improvements to F-5A/B were realised with the installation of "Tiger II" avionics on, probably, 8 F-5A and 2 F-5B. A contract was stipulated with the French company SOGERMA at Bordeaux (France), all aircraft were received by 1998. From 2001 to 2004 the RMAF's F-5E/F received a full refurbishment and upgrade from SOGERMA. The upgraded improved the performance of the "Tiger II" to the level of the "Tiger III". The work carried up included:

- new FIAR Grifo F/X Plus improved radar (similar in performance to the AN/APG-69)
- Elettronica ELT/555 active Electronic Countermeasures (ECM) pods.
- HOTAS (Hands On Throttle And Stick)
- New EWPS/-100 (DM/A-106) RWR
- Cockpit Layout with new:
  - heads-up display
  - Weapons Delivery and Navigation System MFD/WDNS
  - Multifunction displays

The F-5E/F TIII acquired the capability to use new weapon systems such as Beyond Visual Range missiles and precise-guided weapons. RADA ACE ground debriefing station, a Simulator and AN/AAQ-28(V) LITENING targeting pods have also been purchased.

==== Mirage F1 MF2000 ASTRAC ====
In 2005, the RMAF started the 350 million euro MF2000 Dassault Mirage F1 upgrade program, which has overhauled 27 Mirage F1s (F1CH, F1EH and F1EH-200) to the level of Mirage 2000-5 to improve survivability for the MF2000, that included :

- The replacement of the old Thomson-CSF Cyrano IV radar by Thales RC400 (RDY-3).
- 4% thrust boost and longer life through a new compressor module for the Snecma Atar 9K50 engines.
- New cockpit Layout with two multifunction LCDs, a Head-Up Display with UFCP (Up Front Control Panel), two mini-LCDs (to RWR and artificial horizon) and full HOTAS controls.
- Inertial-aided GPS Navigator Sagem Sigma 95.
- CN2H-AA Mk II Night-Vision Goggles.
- Modern zero-zero ejection seat.
- About 100 million euro worth of MICA missiles
- New electronics:
  - New weapons management system.
  - Advanced Thales Radar-warning system.
  - New Data Link.
  - Improved communications-system.
  - Two Dynamic task computer-integrated with a MIL-STD-1553B bus.

The upgrade enabled the use of more advanced equipment as:

- Corail flare launchers.
- Phimat chaff dispensers.
- Electronic protection-Pod PAJ-FA ECM.
- Thales Damocles Pod.
- Capability to carry Advanced Air-to-air missiles, Air-to-ground missiles and guided-bombs :
  - Armement Air-Sol Modulaire (AASM) GPS/INS and GPS/INS+IIR guided bombs.
  - AM39 Exocet Air-to-sea missiles.
  - Paveway Laser-guided bombs.

This upgrade was developed by ASTRAC (Association Sagem Thales pour la Rénovation d'Avions de Combat).

==== T-6C Texan and F-16C/D Block 52+ ====
In 2007, Morocco formally requested 24 T-6C Texan trainer aircraft, with very secondary light attack capability.

In 2008, a $2.4 billion order was placed for 24 F-16C/D Block 52+ aircraft as well as associated equipment and services, with:

- F100-PW-229 Enhanced Engine Package (EEP) turbofan engines
- AN/APG-68V9 radars
- conformal fuel tanks (CFTs).

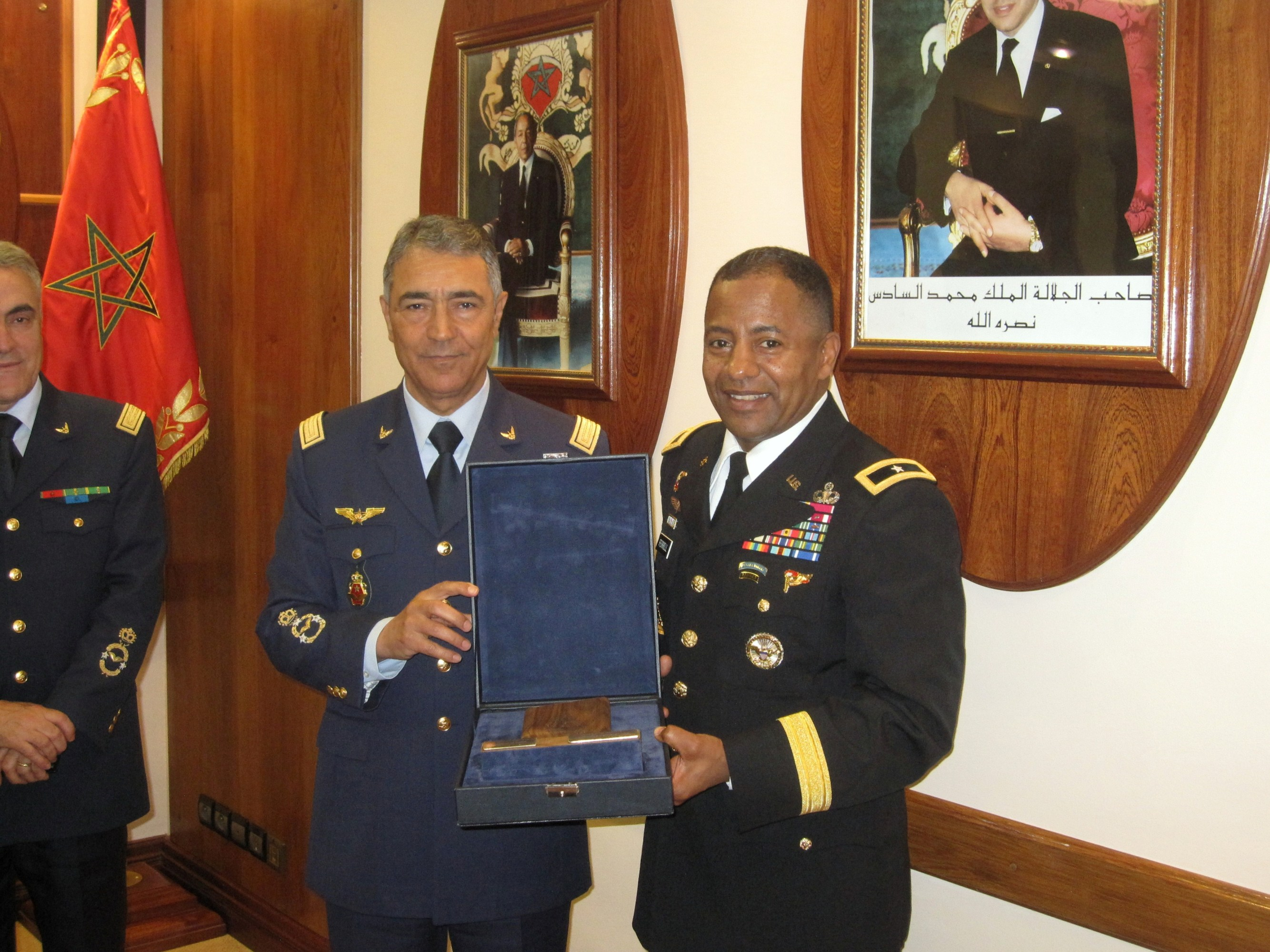
General Ahmed Boutaleb (left) during a meeting with Brigadier General Robert Ferrell, March 2010

==== F-16 fleet improvements ====
Later, from 2008 to 2012 the RMAF purchased advanced equipment for its F-16 fleet:

- Advanced countermeasures electronic systems (ACES).
- Joint Helmet Mounted Cueing Systems (JHMCS).
- AN/AVS-9 night vision goggles.
- AN/APX-113 Advanced Identification Friend or Foe (AIFF) Systems.
- AN/ALQ-187 Advanced Self-Protection Integrated Suites (ASPIS II).
- AN/ALR-93 radar warning receivers.
- DB-110 airborne reconnaissance pods.
- AN/AAQ-33 Sniper Advanced Targeting Pods (ATPs).

Advanced armament was also acquired:

- AIM-120 C7 Advanced Medium Range Air-to Air Missiles (AMRAAM).
- AIM-9M-9 and AIM-9X Block II Sidewinder short range air-to-air missiles.
- AGM-88B/C HARM Missiles.
- AGM-65D/G/H MAVERICK Missiles.
- AGM-84L Harpoon Block II Missiles.
- GPS/INS and Laser-guided Joint Direct Attack Munition (JDAM) tail kits.
- GBU-24 Paveway III, GBU-10 Paveway II and GBU-12 Paveway II laser-guidance and fin kits to convert 2,000 pound bombs.

==== Other purchases and upgrades ====
In 2008, 4 C-27J Spartan tactical transport aircraft were also purchased from Finmeccanica subsidiary Alenia Aeronautica for 130 million euro, and the advanced trainer and CAS/COIN aircraft Alpha Jet E fleet was upgraded to the "E+ standard". General Atomics received in 2010 export licenses to sell an unarmed export version of the Predator to Saudi Arabia, Egypt, U.A.E. and Morocco. Six aerial firefighting Bombardier 415 Superscooper were also purchased in 2011. The modernization and upgrade of the former US Air Force base in Ben Guerir Air Base to support its F-16 Fighting Falcon aircraft is also important. In March 2013, it has been reported that the RMAF have purchased 3 EADS Harfang MALE UAVs decommissioned by France, but these would not have been delivered until 2020.

In 2015, 3 refurbished CH-47D were received from the US, to be added to the 9 CH-47C delivered in 1979 and 1982 (originally 12 were acquired).

In 2019, Government of Morocco requested purchase of 25 F-16 block 72 and was approved by The U.S. Department of State. A $2.8 billion contract was signed in 2020. First shipment of 12 new Vipers will be received in 2021.

It has been proposed to upgrade the existing F-16s to the Block 72 standard.

24 Apache helicopters were also ordered in 2020.

== Ranks ==
Officers

Rank group	General / flag officers				Senior officers				Junior officers
Royal Moroccan Air Force
Royal Moroccan Air Force	Général d'armée aerienne	Général de corps aerienne	Général de division aerienne	Général de brigade aerienne	Colonel major	Colonel	Lieutenant-colonel	Commandant	Capitaine	Lieutenant	Sous-lieutenant

- Général Suprême des Armées et Commandant en Chef: His Majesty the King of Morocco.

Enlisted

Rank group	Senior NCOs					Junior NCOs		Enlisted
Royal Moroccan Air Force									No insignia
Royal Moroccan Air Force	Adjudant-chef	Adjudant	Sergent-major	Sergent-chef	Sergent	Caporal-chef	Caporal	Soldat de première classe	Soldat de deuxième classe

== Airbases ==
−
RMAF Air Bases in Morocco
- Salé BAFRA Nº7 (Air Base)
- Meknes BAFRA Nº6 (Air Base)
- Kenitra BAFRA Nº3 (Air Base)
- Laayoun BAFRA Nº4 (Air Base)
- Sidi Slimane BAFRA Nº5 (Air Base)
- Ben Guerir BAFRA N°1 (Air Base)
- Oujda BAFRA N°0 (Air Bases Headquarter)
- Marrakech BEFRA (Academy Air Base & Air Base)
- Rabat North Area Headquarters
- Agadir South Area Headquarters
- Casablanca Aeronaval Base
- Khouribga Annexe AeroBase
- Guelmim

== Aircraft ==
=== Current inventory ===
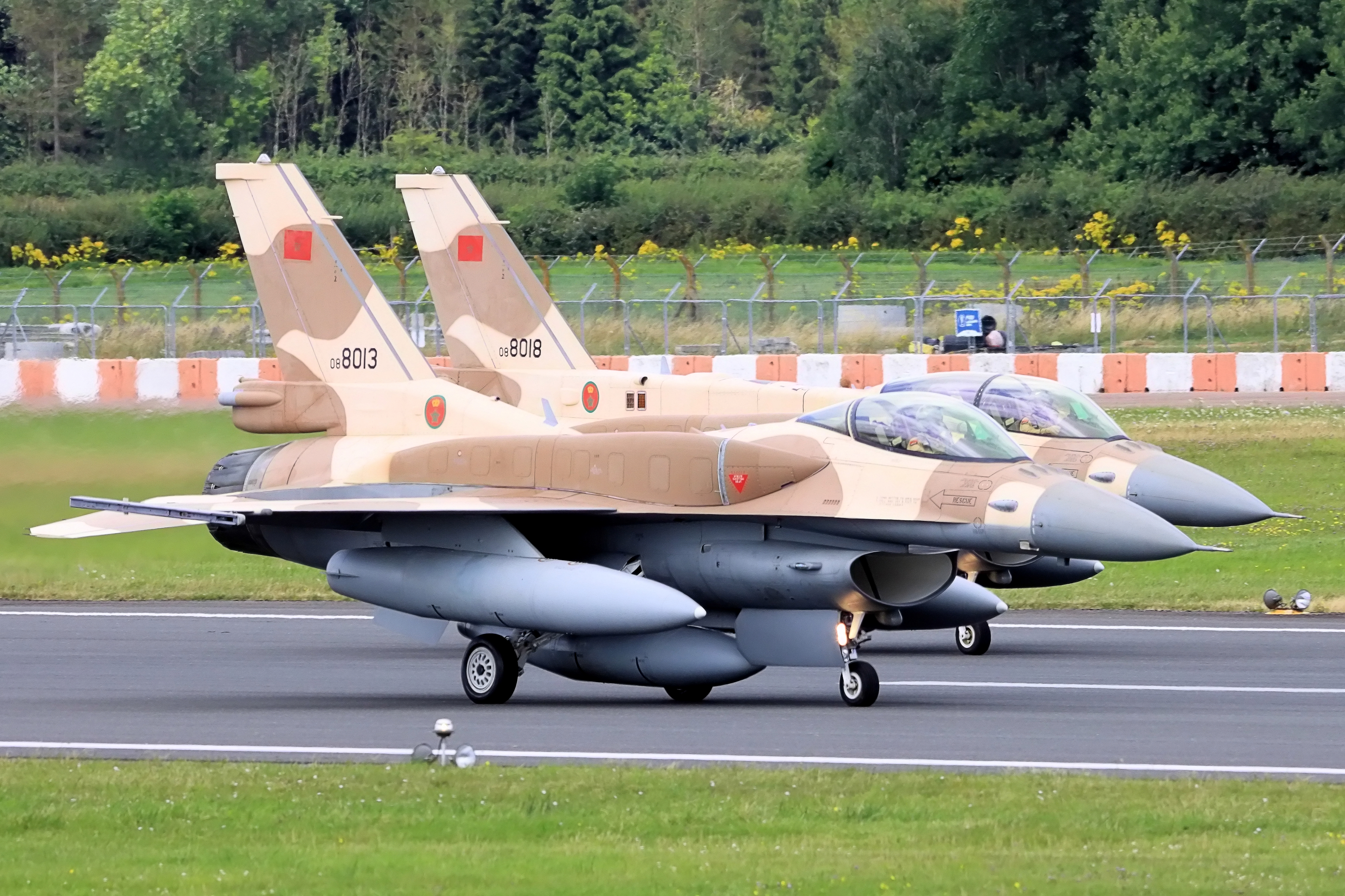
Moroccan F-16s

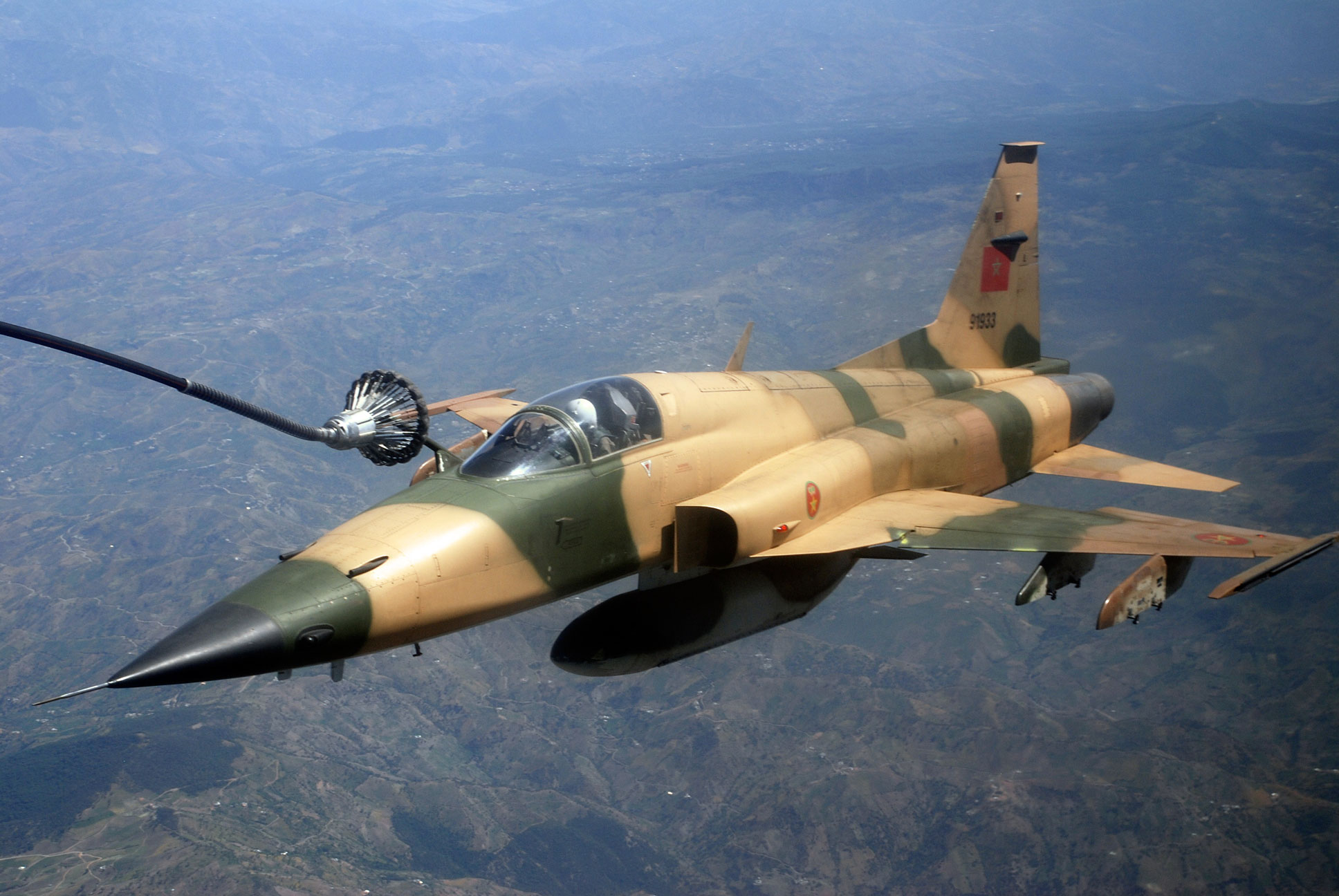
A Moroccan F-5E

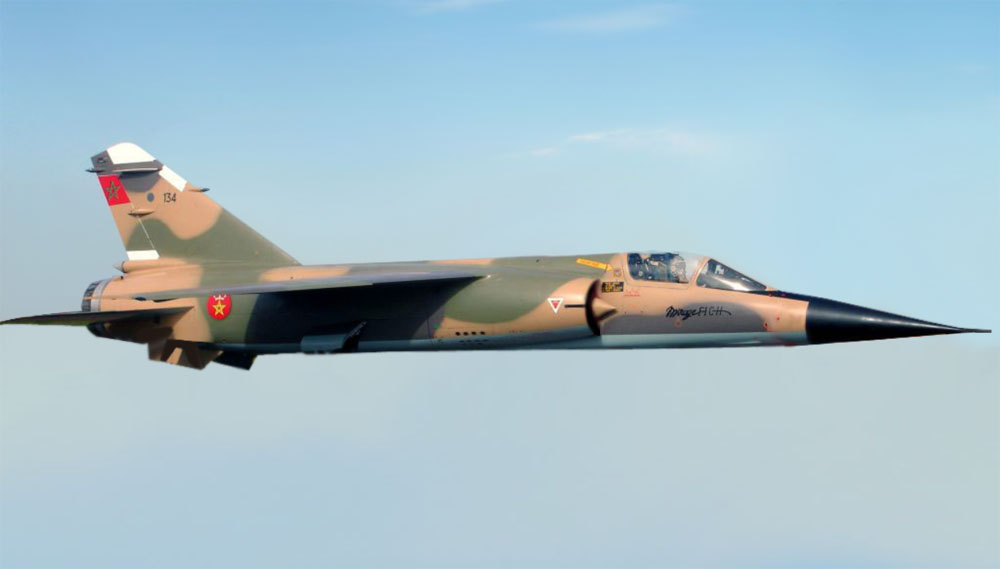
A Moroccan Mirage F1CH

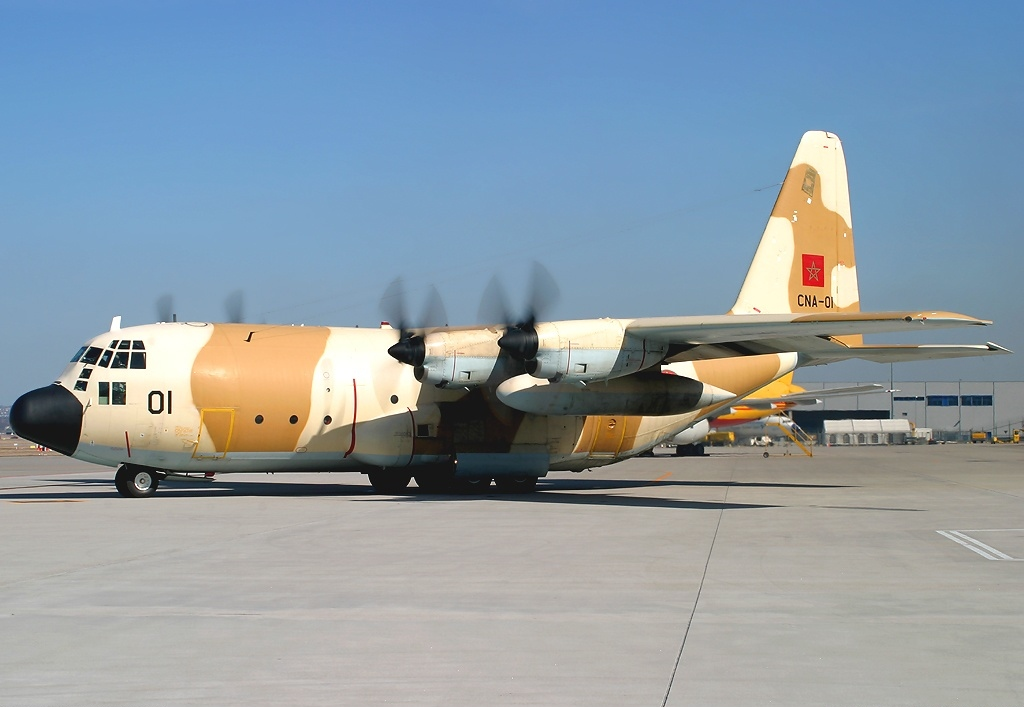
A Moroccan C-130H

Aircraft	Origin	Type	Variant	In service	Notes
Combat aircraft
F-16 Fighting Falcon	United States	multirole	F-16C/D	23	8 D variants used for training - 25 F-16Vs on order (23 Blk.52+ to be upgraded to Block 72 and 25 Blk.70/72 delivery on progress)
Northrop F-5	United States	fighter	F-5E/F	22	3 F-5Fs provided training
Mirage F1	France	multirole	F1EM-VI	25	MF2000 Upgrade
Special Mission
Gulfstream G550	United States	AEW&C	CAEW	2	2 on order
Dassault Falcon 20	France	ELINT		2	
Bombardier CL-415	Canada	water bomber		8	
Transport
Boeing 747	United States	VIP transport		2	1 BBJ 747-8 ( CN-MBH ) possessed by the King of Morocco Mohammed VI, and a 747-400 ( CN-RGA ) for the Moroccan government
Boeing 737	United States	VIP transport	B-737BBJ	1	
Falcon 20	France	VIP transport		2	
Falcon 50	France	VIP transport		1	
Gulfstream II	United States	VIP transport		1	
Gulfstream III	United States	VIP transport		1	
Gulfstream V	United States	VIP transport	Gulfstream V-SP	1	
C-27J Spartan	Italy	transport		4	
C-130 Hercules	United States	transport	C-130H	16	2 KC-130Hs provided aerial refueling, 1 EC-130Hs provided ELINT
CASA CN-235	Spain / Indonesia	utility / transport		5	
Super King Air	United States	utility	200/300/350	8	
Airbus C295	Spain	Tactical airlifter	C-295W	2	On order
Helicopters
AH-64 Apache	United States	attack	AH-64E	19	5 on order
Aérospatiale Gazelle	France	scout / anti-armor	SA342	19	
Eurocopter EC635	European Union	light utility	H135M	6	
Bell 205	United States	utility	AB-205A	24	
Bell 212	United States	utility	AB-212	3	
Bell 429	United States	utility	AB-429	4	
SA330 Puma	France	utility / transport		24	
CH-47 Chinook	United States	cargo / transport	CH-47D	10	former US Army aircraft
Trainer aircraft
Alpha Jet	Germany / France	jet trainer / light attack	E	19	replaced the CM.170R Magister and T-37B Tweet
CAP 10	France	light trainer		2	
T-6 Texan II	United States	advanced trainer	T-6C	24	
Super King Air	United States	multi engine trainer	100	4	
Bell 206	United States	rotor-craft trainer		5	
UAVs
BAE SkyEye	United States	reconnaissance		6	
IAI Heron	Israel	reconnaissance		3	
Elbit Hermes 900	Israel	reconnaissance		4	
EADS Harfang	France / Israel	MALE UAV		3	
CAIG Wing Loong	China	MALE UAV		3	donated by the UAE
MQ-9 Reaper	United States	UCAV	Sea Guardian	4	
Bayraktar TB2	Turkey	MALE UCAV		13 or 19 or +20	
Bayraktar Akıncı	Turkey	HALE UCAV		N/A´	On order

== Accidents ==
In January 2011, a Royal Moroccan Air Force F-5 crashed while trying to land at the airport of the military base in Meknes and a pilot was killed in the crash.

In July 2011, a Royal Moroccan Air Force C-130H crash killed 78 people after the aircraft, en route from Dakhla, a city in Morocco to Kenitra Air Base in Kenitra, crashed 9.7 km (6 mi) from a planned stop-over at Guelmim Air Base. The 6 crew, 60 members of the army and 12 civilians, mainly partners travelling with their partners, perished in the accident.

In November 2012, nine soldiers were killed and two seriously injured in a SA330 Puma crash in the same region of Guelmim during a combined forces exercise.

On May 11, 2015, a Royal Moroccan Air Force F-16 which was taking part in air campaign in Yemen crashed due to technical faults.

On 16 August 2015, a Mirage F1 was lost after a bird strike.

On 21 January 2019, a Mirage F1 has crashed in Taounat area due to a technical problem. The pilot ejected before the crash.
