= Archie J. Old Jr. =

United States Air Force general

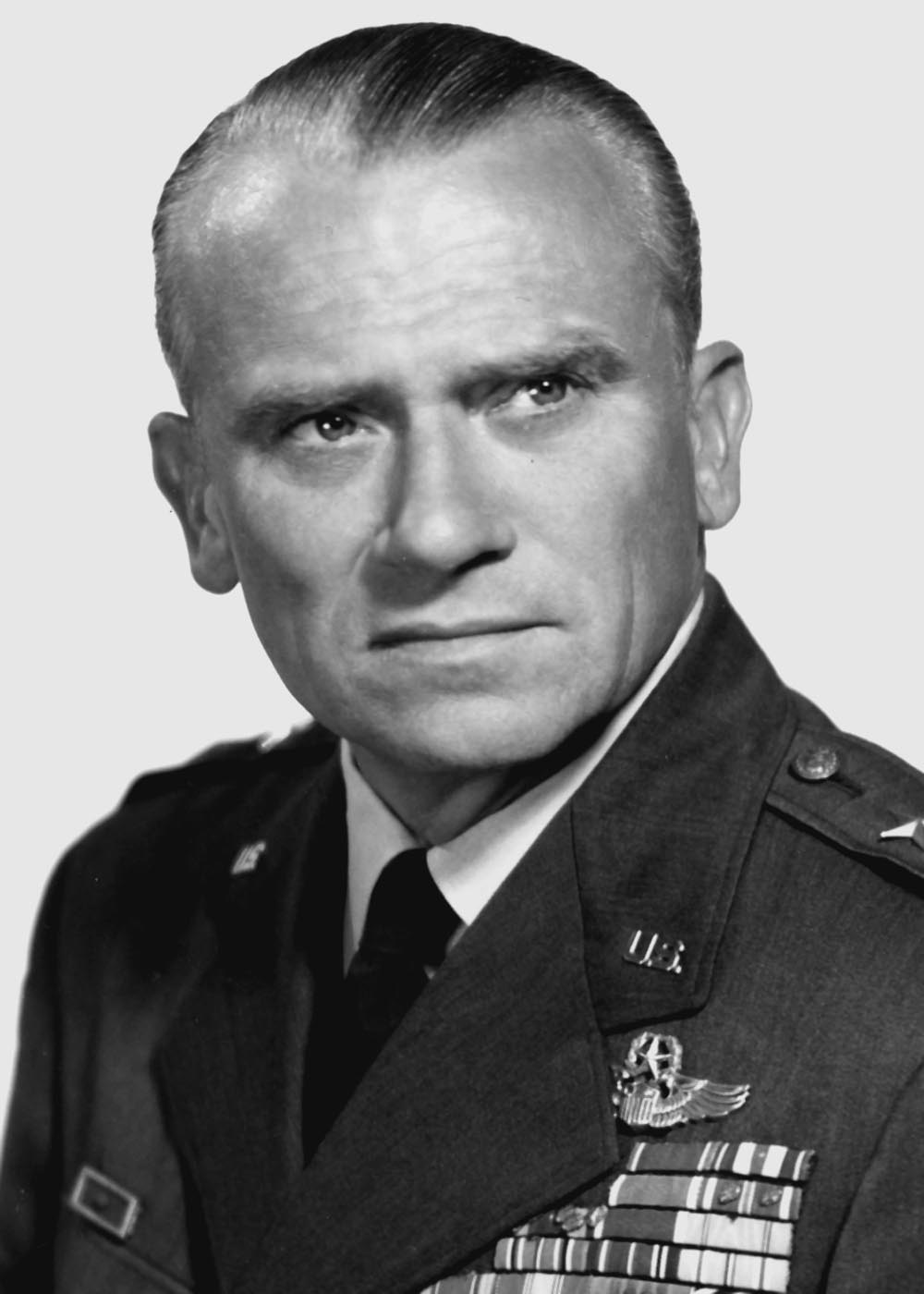
- Lieutenant General Archie J. Old Jr.
- Born: August 1, 1906; Farmersville, Texas
- Died: March 24, 1984 (aged 77); March AFB, California
- Military career
- Allegiance: United States
- Branch: United States Air Force
- Service years: 1930–1965
- Rank: Lieutenant General
- Commands: Fifteenth Air Force; 5th Air Division; 7th Air Division; 20th Combat Bombardment Wing; 45th Combat Bombardment Wing; 530th Air Transport Wing; 96th Bomb Group
- Conflicts: World War II
- Awards: Distinguished Service Cross; Air Force Distinguished Service Medal; Silver Star (2); Legion of Merit; Distinguished Flying Cross (5); Purple Heart; Air Medal (9)

Archie J. Old Jr. (August 1, 1906 – March 24, 1984) was a lieutenant general in the United States Air Force.

== Early life ==
Old was born in Farmersville, Texas, on August 1, 1906.

== Military career ==
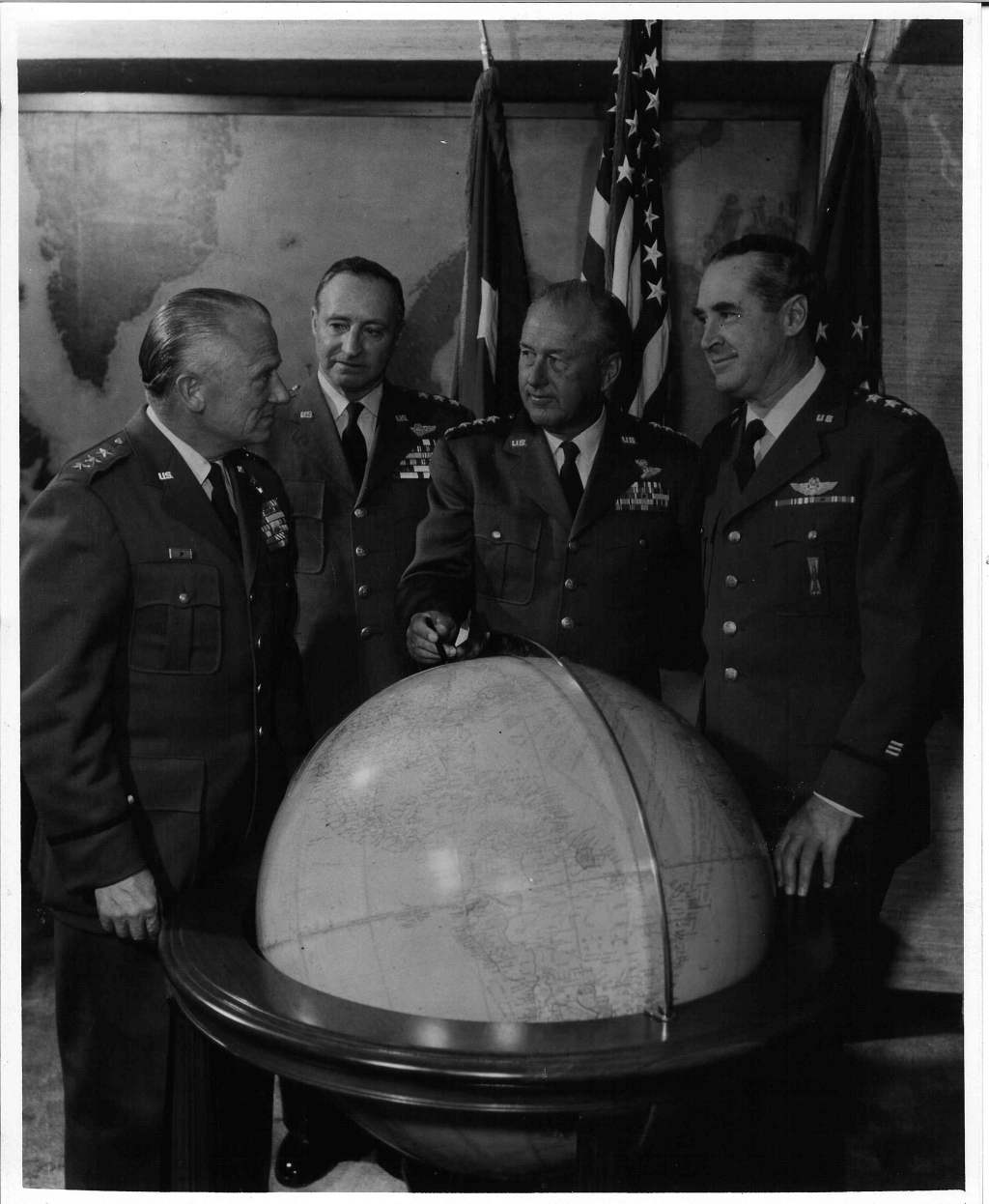
Far left is Lt. Gen. Archie J. Old at Offutt Air Force Base, Nebraska

Old flew 43 combat missions against Germany. On October 14, 1943, Old led the second raid on the Schweinfurt ball-bearing factories in the Fertile Myrtle III. Of 291 B-17s that reached the target, 60 were downed by flak or enemy fighters, for a loss rate of 20 percent. On June 21, 1944, Old led the second shuttle bombing run to Russia. The B-17 that Col. Old was in for the first Schweinfurt mission aborted, so Col. Curtis Lemay and BGen. Robert Williams led the first Schweinfurt raid on 17 August; Col. Old and Maj. Thomas F. Kenny led the second Schweinfurt raid on 14 October 1943. On June 21, 1944, Col. Old led the second Shuttle Mission to Russia.

In July 1948 he was named commander of the Atlantic Division of the Military Air Transport Service.

In 1951 Old got two of SAC's important overseas jobs of commanding the 7th Air Division in England and the 5th Air Division in French Morocco. Old retired September 1, 1965. He died March 24, 1984, at the base hospital at March Air Force Base.

== Other achievements ==
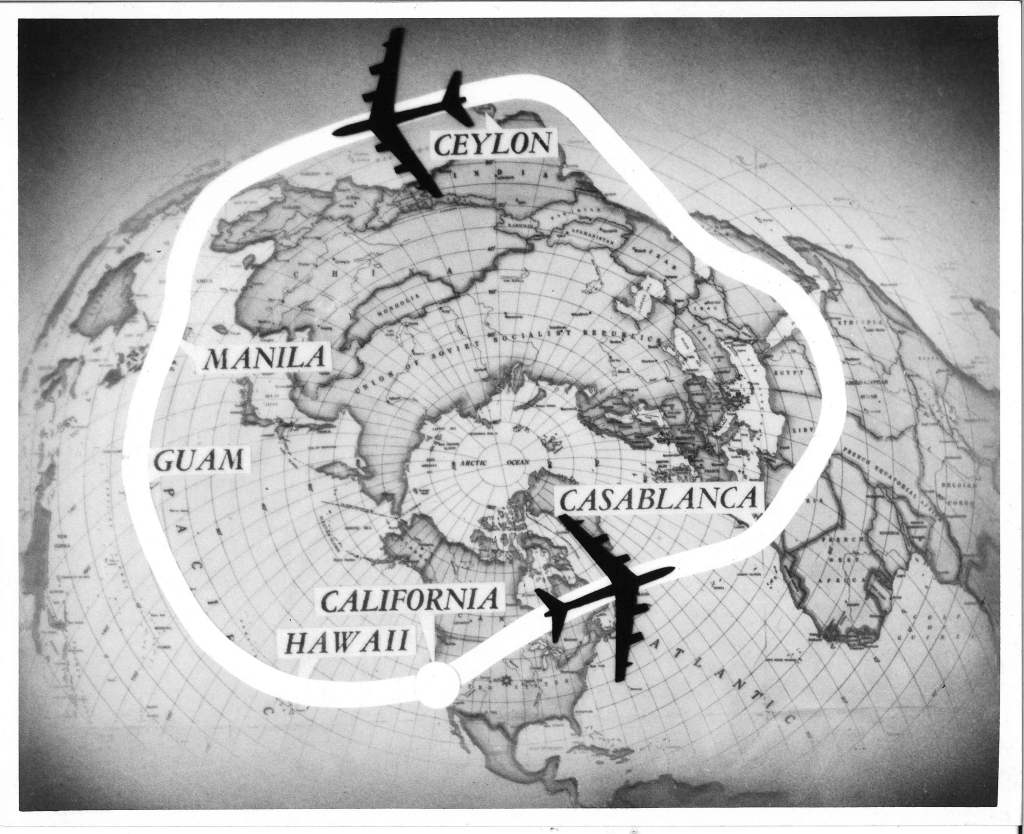
First round-the-world nonstop flight by a jet airplane.

Old led Operation Power Flite as a Major General. Three Boeing B-52 Stratofortresses became the first jet aircraft to circle the world nonstop in that mission. The mission was intended to demonstrate that the United States had the ability to drop a hydrogen bomb anywhere in the world.

== Military awards ==
- Distinguished Service Cross
- Air Force Distinguished Service Medal
- Silver Star with oak leaf cluster
- Legion of Merit
- Distinguished Flying Cross with four oak leaf clusters
- Purple Heart
- Air Medal with eight oak leaf clusters

== Foreign decorations ==
- French Legion of Honor
- Belgian Croix de guerre with Palm
- Soviet Order of Suvorov Second Class
- French Croix de Guerre with Palm
- British Distinguished Flying Cross
- French Moroccan Order of Ouissam Alaouite

== Television appearance ==
Old appeared, playing himself, in "Massacre", a 1966 episode of the television show Twelve O'Clock High.
