= 5th Air Division =

- Active: 1940–1941; 1942–1945; 1951–1958
- Country: United States
- Branch: United States Air Force
- Role: Command of deployed strategic forces
- Equipment: see "Aircraft / Missiles / Space Vehicles" section below
- Engagements: European Theater of Operations

Commanders
- Notable commanders: Lt Gen Archie J. Old, Jr.

Insignia
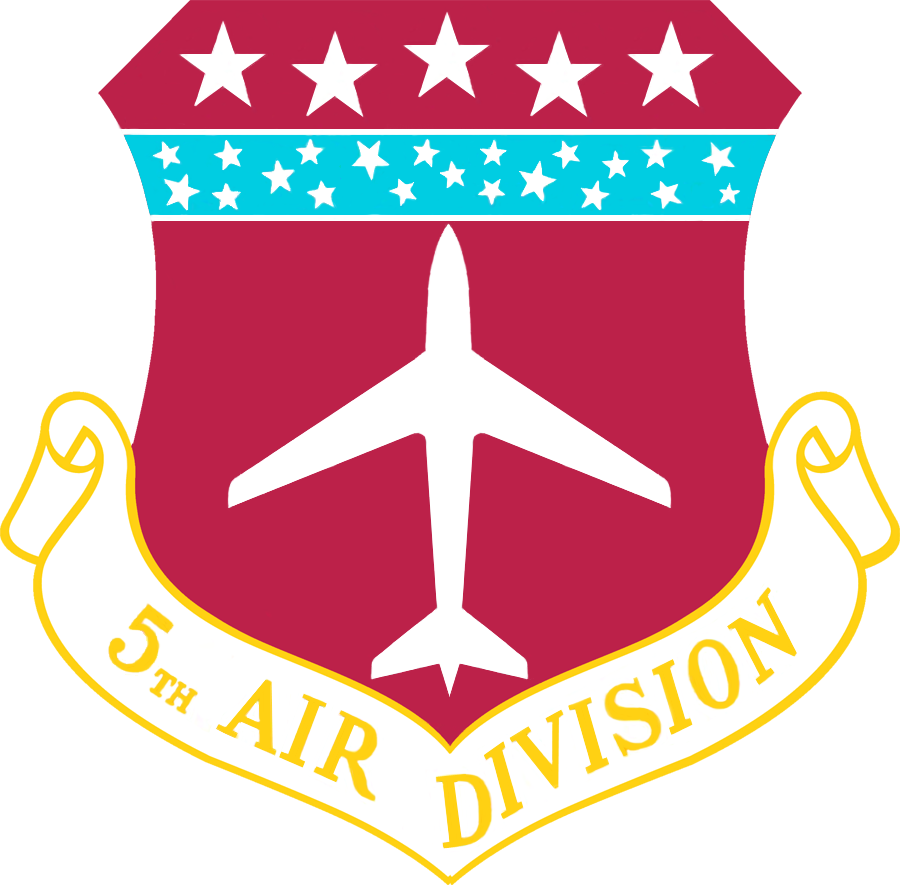
- 5th Air Division emblem (Note: Approved 3 November 1954. Description: Gules, a stylized silhouetted aircraft volant, nose to the chief argent; on a chief per fess gules and argent, five stars argent in chief, and a ribbon of the firmament, sky blue, in base charged with seme of stars of the second [color]. Maurer, Combat Units, p. 378.)

The 5th Air Division is an inactive United States Air Force unit. Its last assignment was with Strategic Air Command, based at Sidi Slimane Air Base, Morocco. It was inactivated on 15 July 1958.

The unit's origins begin with its predecessor, the World War II 5th Bombardment Wing. This unit was initially part of Twelfth Air Force before being reassigned in November 1943 to the Fifteenth Air Force. The wing flew Boeing B-17 Flying Fortress bombing missions against Germany.

During the Cold War, the 5th was an intermediate command echelon of Strategic Air Command, absorbed the resources and responsibilities of the USAF Mission to Morocco as part of Sixteenth Air Force in 1957.

Inactivated in end of 1957 when the USAF drew down its forces from Morocco at the request of the Moroccan government. It was replaced by the SAC 4310th Air Division which absorbed the mission and personnel of the 5th AD.

== History ==
=== World War II ===
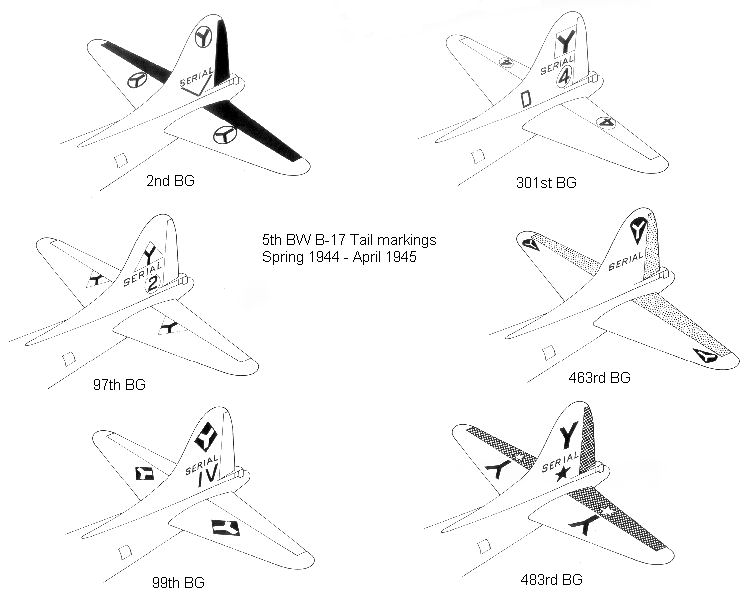
Tail Codes of the 5th Bombardment Wing, Fifteenth Air Force

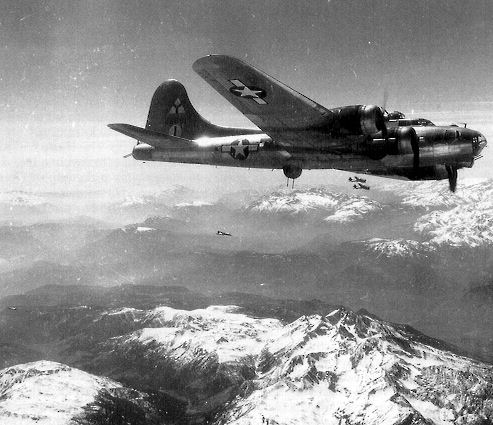
B-17F of the 97th Bomb Group over the Alps

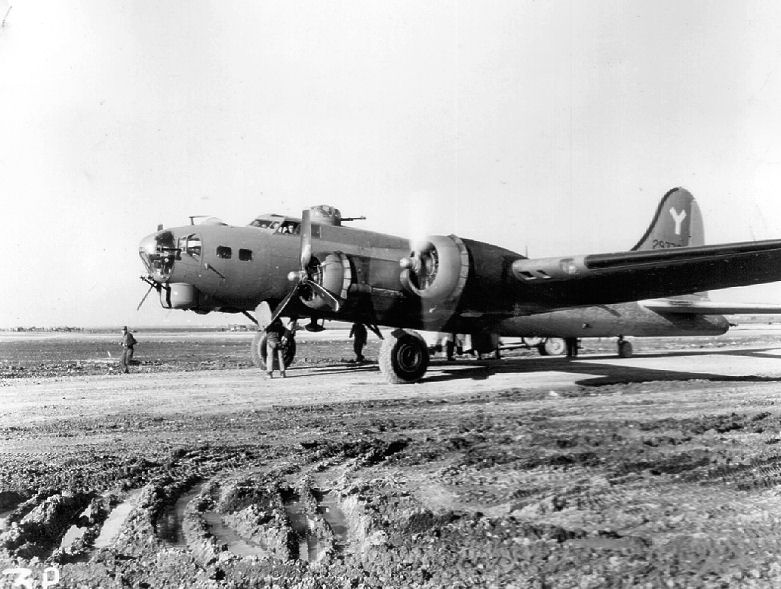
B-17G of the 301st Bomb Group, Italy 1944

The 5th Air Division originated on 19 October 1940 at McChord Field, |Washington. Its initial mission was air defense of the northwest United States with three bombardment groups (12th, 17th and 39th) flying early B-17 Flying Fortresses (B-17C/D), as well as the B-18 Bolo and its B-23 Dragon variant.

With the United States' entry into World War II, the mission of the 5th Bomb Wing was changed to that of a strategic heavy bomber wing, in July 1942 being initially assigned to the new Eighth Air Force. However, the 5th Bomb Wing was reassigned to the Twelfth Air Force in October 1942, to support the Western Task Force being assembled for the Operation Torch landings, planned for November.

The 5th moved to North Africa in November, and its subordinate units began flying missions from French Morocco in late 1942. The 97th and 301st Bomb groups, both being transferred from Eighth Air Force, were the pioneer heavy bomb groups in North Africa.

Three weeks prior to the invasion saw a number of secret missions flown by the 97th BG. The first of these occurred on 18 October 1942 when General Mark Clark, commander of ground forces in the Western Task Force, flew to Gibraltar, along with a box containing $100,000 in gold 20 Franc coins, which were going to be paid to corrupt Vichy France officials in North Africa in order to secure their cooperation during the coming invasion. However, after Clark landed in Gibraltar, the coins were lost overboard when they were on the final leg of their journey.

Also, on 5 November General Dwight Eisenhower and British General Kenneth Anderson was flown on a 97th BG B-17 were flown from Britain to Gibraltar. The following day, General James Doolittle, the newly named commander of Twelfth Air Force was flown to Gibraltar. Doolittle's B-17 was intercepted by four Ju-88s over the Bay of Biscay, forcing the pilot to dive sharply and make a run for it just above the ocean's surface. The co-pilot of the aircraft was injured by a strafing run of one of the German aircraft, and Doolittle reached for the first aid kit and attended to the wounded man. Afterward, Doolittle sat in the co-pilot's seat and helped fly the aircraft to Gibraltar.

Shortly after the invasion, the 97th and 301st moved from their bases in England to an airfield at Tafraoui, Algeria. The conditions in Algeria were sparse compared to that in England, but by 24 November the two groups attacked the docks at Bizerte, Tunisia.

As the American forces moved eastward, the 5th's units flew from Algeria beginning in January 1943, attacking coastal targets in Tunisia, and also concentrations of Erwin Rommel's Afrika Corps. The 5th moved to Tunisia in August. Targets included airdromes, marshalling yards, bridges, and troop concentrations. In February 1943, the 5th, in direct support of ground operations, bombed enemy troop concentrations in the Kasserine Pass. From its airfields in Tunisia, its subordinate units bombed Pantelleria, Sicily, and marshaling yards and airdromes on the Italian mainland. By October, the 5th Bombardment Wing consisted of the two B-17 groups as well as two P-38 equipped fighter groups (1st, 325th FG).

On 1 November 1943, Fifteenth Air Force was established as a second American strategic air force in the European Theater. It was hoped that the 15th AF stationed in the Mediterranean would be able to operate when the Eighth Air Force in England was socked in by bad English weather. Twelfth Air Force would continue to operate, however it would be realigned as a tactical air force. The 97th and 301st were joined with three additional B-17 groups (2d, 98th 99th BG) with its reassignment to Fifteenth Air Force.

Missions were flown from Tunisia in November against a Messerschmidt assembly plant in Austria, and against some Italian targets, however the wing and its groups were in the process of moving to new airfields captured around Foggia in Italy in late September. Advanced echelons moved initially, working with engineering units to prepare the airfields and extend runways to accommodate the B-17. The 2d Bomb Group moved to Amendola airfield, while the 97th moved to the Foggia airfield, as its base at San Giovanni was still not ready. The 301st flew into Cerignola and the 99th into Tortorella.

Once settled into their new bases around Foggia the 5th began a series of raids, attacking enemy targets in Germany, Austria, Hungary, Yugoslavia, Greece, and Bulgaria. In June 1944, its groups began "shuttle bombing" and landing on airfields behind the Russian front. On these missions, American aircraft took off from airdromes in Italy, made a bombing attack, and landed on airdromes in the Soviet Union. Then they reversed the process. In August 1944, the 5th Wing supported Operation Dragoon, the invasion of Southern France.

The 5th Bomb Wing continued strategic bombing missions until the Germans surrendered in May 1945. It was inactivated in Italy on 2 November 1945.

=== Cold War ===
Strategic Air Command (SAC) formed two new air divisions in early 1951. The 7th Air Division was formed to operate from Royal Air Force stations in the United Kingdom. Meanwhile the 5th Wing was redesignated the 5th Air Division and activated at Offutt Air Force Base, Nebraska, where Maj Gen Archie J. Old, Jr. formed its cadre before it moved overseas to control SAC units in Morocco. The 7th Division, led by Brig Gen Paul T. Cullen, was the first to deploy, leaving for England in March, but the Douglas C-124 Globemaster II aircraft carrying General Cullen and his staff crashed in the Atlantic, leaving no survivors. General Old hastily flew to England, where he took command of the 7th Division until a permanent commander could arrive. Once a new commander was appointed in May, General Old and his staff proceeded to Morocco to establish the 5th Division headquarters there. The division exercised jurisdiction over three bases built for SAC bombers in Morocco, Sidi Slimane Air Base, Ben Guerir Air Base, and Nouasseur Air Base. (Note: The original plan was for five bases, all of them French Air Force installations, but of this list only Nouasseur was used for deployed SAC bombers.)

The original agreement for the use of bases in Morocco had been negotiated in 1950, at a time when the country was still under French rule. The negotiations had not included the local sultan, who became King Mohammed V when Morocco became fully independent in 1956. Although the kingdom honored other international commitments made by France, it insisted on new negotiations to determine the status of the division's bases. In 1957 the 5th Air Division was reassigned to Sixteenth Air Force. Sixteenth Air Force also controlled four new bases in Spain that were being prepared for SAC use in anticipation of the possible loss of its Moroccan airfields.

In September 1957, the B-47s at Sidi Slimane were put on ground alert, armed, fueled and ready to take off upon short notice. For the remainder of the division's existence in Morocco, this status, known as Reflex Action (usually shortened to just Reflex), would be the normal status for the Stratojets rotating through Morocco.

From its headquarters the 5th supported, manned, trained, and equipped assigned units and prepared installations in support of Reflex operations until the end of 1957. The 1956 renegotiation of rights for its bases was complicated by the continuing French presence and desire for participation in the negotiations, which was opposed by Morocco, tying participation to the issue of colonialism. Finally, the USAF withdrew from Morocco at the request of the Moroccan government.

The unit was inactivated on 15 January 1958, being replaced by the 4310th Air Division, which assumed it personnel and equipment.

== Lineage ==
- Established as the 5th Bombardment Wing on 19 October 1940

Activated on 18 December 1940
Inactivated on 5 September 1941

- Activated on 10 July 1942

Redesignated 5th Bombardment Wing, Heavy on 1 January 1945
Inactivated on 2 November 1945

- Redesignated 5th Air Division on 10 January 1951

Activated on 14 January 1951
Inactivated on 25 January 1952
Organized on 25 January 1952
Inactivated on 15 January 1958

=== Assignments ===
- GHQ Air Force, 18 December 1940-unknown
- Second Air Force, unknown-5 September 1941
- Eighth Air Force, 10 July 1942-unknown (attached to First Air Force)
- XII Air Support Command, c. 13 October 1942
- Fifteenth Air Force, 1 November 1943 – 15 September 1945
- Unknown, 16 September – 2 November 1945
- Strategic Air Command, 14 January 1951 – 25 January 1952; 25 January 1952
- Sixteenth Air Force, 1 July 1957 – 15 January 1958

=== Stations ===
- McChord Field, Washington, 18 December 1940 – 9 January 1941
- Fort George Wright, Washington. 9 January – 5 September 1941
- Bolling Field, District of Columbia, 10–31 July 1942
- Westover Field, Massachusetts, c. 31 July – October 1942
- Casablanca, French Morocco, November 1942
- Oujda Airfield, French Morocco, December 1942
- Biskra Airfield, Algeria, c. January 1943
- Chateaudun Du Rhumel Airfield, Algeria, c. March 1943
- Depienne Airfield, Tunisia, August 1943
- Foggia Airfield, Italy, December 1943 – 2 November 1945
- Offutt Air Force Base, Nebraska, 14 January – 25 May 1951
- Rabat/Sale Airfield, French Morocco, 25 May 1951 – 25 January 1952
- Sidi Slimane Air Base, French Morocco (later, Morocco), 29 May 1954 – 15 January 1958

=== Components ===
==== Wings ====
- (Numerous Strategic Air Command Wings were attached to the Division while deployed from the United States to Morocco for rotating Operation Reflex deployments 1951–1958)

==== Groups ====
- 1st Fighter Group: May 1943, January – 27 March 1944
- 2d Bombardment Group: 1 November 1943 – 15 December 1945
- 12th Bombardment Group: 15 January – December 1941
- 14th Fighter Group: May – 10 July 1943; 14–25 July 1943; September–November 1943
- 17th Bombardment Group: 18 December 1940 – 25 May 1941
- 39th Bombardment Group: 15 January – 5 September 1941
- 47th Bombardment Group: October–December 1942; 22 January – 18 February 1943
- 68th Reconnaissance Group: November 1943 – April 1944
- 82d Fighter Group: 13 January – 27 March 1944
- 97th Bombardment Group: January 1943 – 29 October 1945
- 98th Bombardment Group: 1–17 November 1943
- 99th Bombardment Group: 1 November 1943 – November 1945
- 301st Bombardment Group: January 1943 – 10 July 1945
- 325th Fighter Group: 22 October 1943 – 26 March 1944
- 376th Bombardment Group: 1–17 November 1943
- 463d Bombardment Group: 9 March 1944 – 25 September 1945
- 483d Bombardment Group: 17 March 1944 – 25 September 1945

== See also ==
- List of United States Air Force air divisions
