= 4310th Air Division =

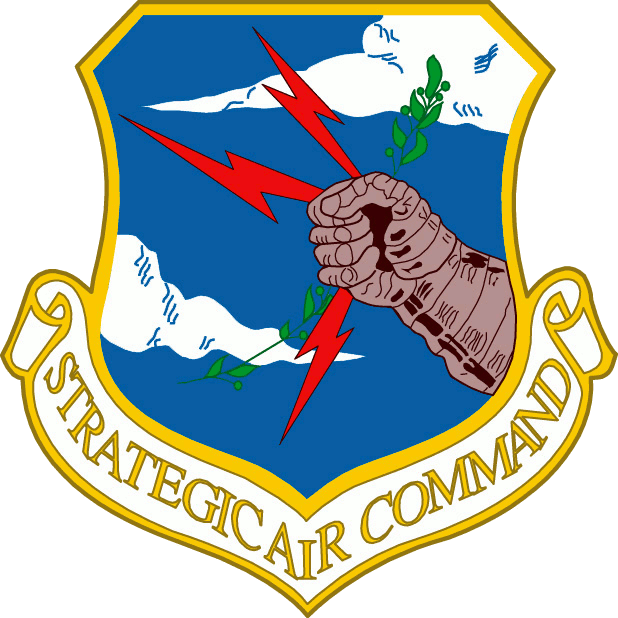
4310th Air Division

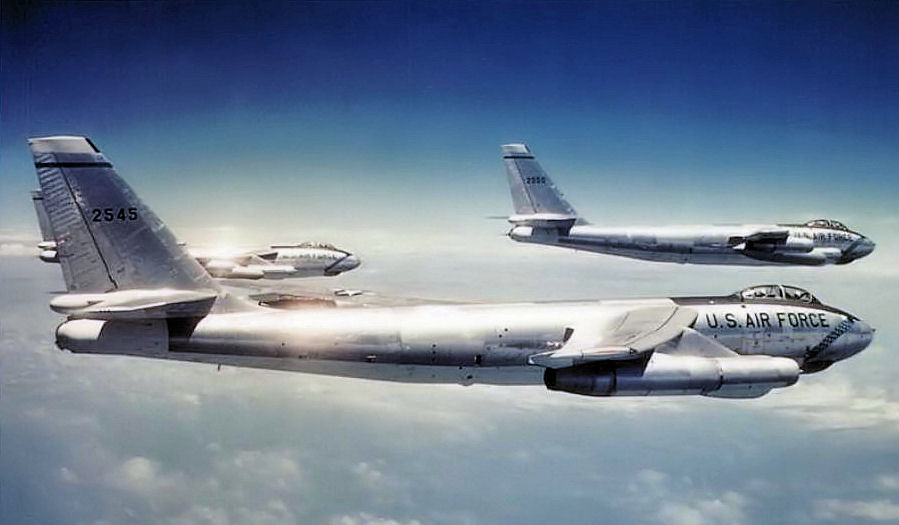
- Boeing B-47s of Strategic Air Command (Note: Aircraft are from the 306th Bombardment Wing. In the foreground is Beoring B-47E-95-BW Stratojet, serial 52-545. This plane was transferred to the Military Aircraft Storage and Disposition Center on 19 November 1965. It was declared excess on 23 October 1968 and scrapped. Baugher, Joe (15 July 2023). "1952 USAF Serial Numbers". Joe Baugher.)
- Active: 1958–1963
- Country: United States
- Branch: United States Air Force
- Role: Command of strategic strike and reconnaissance forces
- Part of: Strategic Air Command

Commanders
- Notable commanders: General Horace M. Wade (Note: In addition, Brig Gen Compton became a Lieutenant General.)

The 4310th Air Division is a discontinued United States Air Force organization. It was last assigned to the Sixteenth Air Force at Nouasseur Air Base, Morocco. It was discontinued on 15 August 1963.

== History ==
The 4310th Air Division was organized on 15 January 1958 by absorbing the mission, personnel and equipment of the 5th Air Division, which had been managing deployed Strategic Air Command (SAC) forces in Morocco since 1954. The 5th was inactivated the same day that the 4310th was organized.

"The 4310th supervised the Strategic Air Command's Reflex forces in Morocco. The Reflex force concept involved deploying Boeing B-47 Stratojet medium bombardment aircraft non-stop from the United States to forward sites, with one air refueling. These aircraft remained on alert status for a specified number of days, then redeployed back to the United States. The division commander also acted as a representative to the Moroccan Liaison office for the Commander, Sixteenth Air Force."

The division never had any assigned units, such as wings, only individual aircraft that were assigned to wings back in the United States.

The division was discontinued in August 1963 as part of SAC's closure of its Morocco bases.

== Lineage ==
- Established as 4310 Air Division and organized on 15 January 1958

Discontinued on 15 August 1963

=== Assignments ===
- Sixteenth Air Force, 15 January 1958 – 15 August 1963

=== Stations ===
- Sidi Slimane Air Base, Morocco, 15 January 1958
- Nouasseur Air Base, Morocco, 15 June 1958 – 15 August 1963

=== Commanders ===
- Brig Gen Keith K. Compton, 15 Jan 1958
- Maj Gen William E. Eubank, by 15 Oct 1958
- Maj Gen Horace M. Wade, 23 Jul 1959
- Brig Gen Robert B. Miller, 5 Aug 1961-15 Aug 1963

== See also ==
- List of United States Air Force air divisions
