= Olde =

Olde is a surname. Notable people with the surname include:

- Barney Olde (1882–1932), Australian politician
- Erika Olde, Canadian film producer, financier and billionaire heiress
- Hans Olde (1855–1917), German painter and art school administrator
- Margareth Olde (born 2000), Estonian chess Woman FIDE Master
- Neil Leverne Olde (1904–1969), Canadian politician

== See also ==
- Ye olde, a phrase used to imitate Old English
- Old (disambiguation)
- Olds (disambiguation)
