= Sidi Slimane Air Base =

Sidi Slimane Air Base Fifth Royal Air Force Base
- IATA: none; ICAO: GMSL

Summary
- Airport type: Military
- Operator: Royal Moroccan Air Force
- Location: Sidi Slimane, Morocco
- Elevation AMSL: 179 ft (55 m)
- Coordinates: 34°13′50″N 006°03′01″W

Map
- Location of air base in Morocco

Runways
Direction	Length		Surface
Direction	m	ft	Surface
08/26	3,445	11,302	Asphalt
- Source: DAFIF

Sidi Slimane Air Base (ICAO: GMSL) is a military air base in Sidi Slimane, a city in the Rabat-Salé-Kénitra region in Morocco. It is also known as the Fifth Royal Air Force Base, operated by the Royal Moroccan Air Force.

== History ==
Built in 1951 by Atlas Construction, Sidi Slimane AB was initially used by Strategic Air Command (SAC) of the United States Air Force as a forward deployment base for B-50 Superfortress and later B-47 Stratojet units deployed from the United States. The base was one of three SAC bases (Boulhaut, Sidi Slimane, Nouasseur) constructed in Morocco in response to the heightened Cold War fears by NATO after the Korean War.

On 13 July 1951, six F84E jet fighters of the 36th Fighter-Bomber Wing from Fürstenfeldbruck Air Base, West Germany, landed at Sidi Slimane marking the first USAF use of the base. The next day, as part of the Bastille Day festivities, this USAF aerial demonstration team known as the Skyblazers performed precision aerobatics over Casablanca and then Nouasseur.

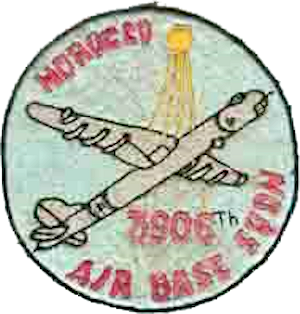
Emblem of the 3906th Air Base Squadron

Host unit was the 3906th Air Base Group Later: 3906th Combat Support Group. Facilities expanded in the early 1950s to accommodate jet aircraft and was used by the SAC 5th Air Division as a forward deployment base for B-47 Stratojet and B-36 Peacemaker bombers and support units during the Cold War.

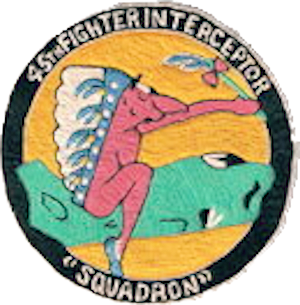
Emblem of the 45th FIS

Sidi Slimane was also used by the Seventeenth Air Force (17 AF) of United States Air Forces in Europe (USAFE), which assigned the 324th Fighter-Interceptor Squadron equipped with F-86D Sabres to provide air defense of the USAF bases in Morocco during the 1950s.

Sidi Slimane Air Base was the location of a Broken Arrow nuclear incident on 31 January 1958. A USAF B-47 carrying an armed nuclear weapon experienced a wheel casting failure during simulated takeoff. The bomber's tail hit the runway, rupturing a fuel tank and igniting a fire. While the weapon did not detonate, the area was evacuated and the abandoned fire burned for seven hours. Some radioactive contamination was detected immediately following the accident.

Sidi Slimane AB was closed on 30 September 1963 and turned over to the Moroccan government.

Today two squadrons equipped with the Mirage F1, Escadron de Chasse Atlas (Mirage F1EH-200) and Escadron de Chasse Assad (Mirage F1CH) use the base. The scale of activity has been reduced to a degree from its height under the USAF.

== Facilities ==
The airport resides at an elevation of 179 feet (55 m) above mean sea level. It has one runway designated 08/26 with an asphalt surface measuring 3,445 by 43 metres (11,302 ft × 141 ft).

The base has supported occasional deployments of SAC Boeing B-52 Stratofortress and KC-135 Stratotankers over the years. A large number of tab-vees on dispersals have been built and at least one helicopter is visible parked. Condition of main runway and taxiways appear to be well-maintained. Some old USAF barracks visible and still appear to be in use to the northwest of flightline area, although most of the buildings have been torn down; the streets remaining.
