= Murray Olds =

Murray Olds is an Australian sports journalist and broadcaster.

He has been a reporter for radio stations, including 2UE, and has provided reports for events such as the Commonwealth Games (including the 2006 Games) and Olympics since the 1980s. He currently works for ABC Radio News in Sydney.
