= Jennifer Miksis-Olds =

Marine scientist

Academic background
- Education: Harvard University (AB); University of Massachusetts Dartmouth (MS); University of Rhode Island (PhD)

Academic work
- Discipline: Biology
- Sub-discipline: Marine biology

Jennifer Miksis-Olds is an American marine scientist known for her research using acoustics to track marine mammals.

== Education ==
Miksis-Olds received an A.B. in biology from Harvard University (1996), and during this time she volunteered in a primate lab which she credits as her introduction to acoustics. Miksis-Olds has an M.S. in biology from the University of Massachusetts Dartmouth (2000) and spent time as a guest student at the Woods Hole Oceanographic Institution (1996–2004). She obtained a Ph.D. from the University of Rhode Island in 2006, where she studied the connections between sound and manatees.

== Career ==
After her graduate work, Miksis-Olds worked at Pennsylvania State University from 2007 until 2016, when she moved to the University of New Hampshire. She is currently the director of the Center for Acoustics Research and Education at the University of New Hampshire.

In 2016, Miksis-Olds was elected a fellow of the Acoustical Society of America,"for contributions to underwater acoustic noise research and the integration of acoustics into marine ecology".

From 2016 to 2018, Miksis-Olds was on the scientific committee of the International Quiet Ocean Experiment, a group of researchers working on ocean soundscapes and how sound impacts marine organisms. Miksis-Olds is also on the board at the Consortium for Ocean Leadership where her term ends in October 2021.

== Research ==
Miksis-Olds' graduate research characterized the pattern of sound production from manatees and measured sound levels in grassbeds inhabited by manatees which revealed that, all else being equal, manatees opt for grassbeds with lower noise levels. Miksis-Olds' research determined that manatees increase their activity in the presence of sounds similar to boats and they alter their behavior with periods of higher sound levels connected to increased feeding activity.

Miksis-Olds has used sound to track the location of marine mammals in the ocean. In the Arctic, Miksis-Olds developed and deployed low power sampling devices to provide data on the presence of whales and she has a decade-long data set tracking different species of marine mammals in the Bering Sea. Miksis-Olds has also used acoustic methods to track seals in the Bering Sea where she connected the presence or absence of seals with the amount of sea ice. Using hydrophone data from the Preparatory Commission for the Comprehensive Nuclear Test Ban Treaty International Monitoring System, Miksis-Olds estimated the biodiversity in the near-field vicinity of three hydrophones. The data are from hydrophones that are part of the system used for monitoring for nuclear explosions and Susan Parks, Miksis-Olds, and Samuel Denes developed a metric that uses sound to assess biodiversity and found correlations between their metric and the number of whale calls around the hydrophones.

Miksis-Olds examines soundscapes in the ocean, particularly the combination of ambient sound and sound produced by people, to define how marine mammals respond to changes in sound and was part of a collaboration that identified an increase in sound levels in the Indian Ocean which can have a negative impact on marine mammals.

During the COVID-19 pandemic, Miksis-Olds and others have been expanding the global network of hydrophones that can track changes in ambient sound in the ocean. Miksis-Olds is leading the development of software that will allow researchers to share and analyze the data being generated by this network of hydrophones.

== Awards and honors ==
- Young Investigator Award, Office of Naval Research (2011)
- Presidential Early Career Awards for Scientists and Engineers (2013)
- Fellow, Acoustical Society of America (2016)
- Medwin Prize, Acoustical Society of America (2017) for "effective use of sound in the discovery and understanding of physical and biological parameters and processes in the sea"
