= W. B. Olds =

American musician, professor, composer, and scholar

William Benjamin Olds (1874–1948) was an American musician, professor, composer, and scholar. His book Bird songs for children was published in 1914. The Musical Quarterly published an article he wrote about bird songs in 1922. Arrangements he made of bird songs were performed.

He worked at Millikin College in Decatur, Illinois. He wrote a college song for the school in 1913. In 1923 he took a position at the University of Redlands in California. He studied bird songs. In Redlands he lived at the Herman A. Westbrook Residence at 805 North University Avenue.

The Choir of the West of Pacific Lutheran University utilized his arrangement for many years as an opener for concerts. The Wartburg Choir's performance of his arrangement Ein feste Burg ist unser Gott features in the documentary The Wartburg Choir in Germany: Celebrating 500 Years of Reformation.

== Education ==
William Benjamin Olds is listed as a student of Oberlin College in 1890 and at Beloit College the same year.

== Personal life ==
He was married to Alice Dole Hannahs Olds, "Alie".

== Work ==
- "The Bread of Life"
- "I Cannot Always Trace the Way: Sacred Songs" 1912
- Twenty-five bird songs for children (1914), G. Schirmer, New York
- A Second Book of Bird Songs for Children (20 more songs)
- A mighty fortress is our God : chorale for double chorus a cappella, S.A.T.B. by W B Olds; Frederick Henry Hedge; Martin Luther, Chicago, Hall & McCreary, (1938), Hall & McCreary choral octavos
- "Hiking with a pitch pipe" (1923 article) Bird-lore
- "Shut your eyes tight, little boy" (1940)
