= Nouasseur Air Base =

United States Air Force base

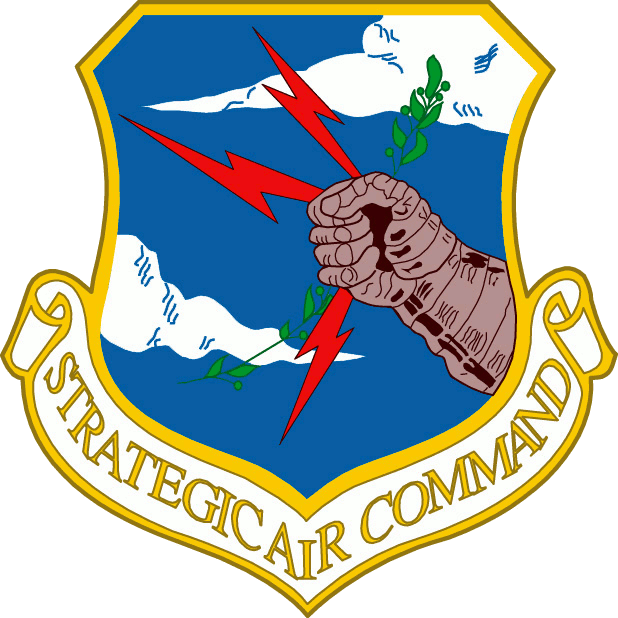
Nouasseur Air Base
- Located near Casablanca, Morocco
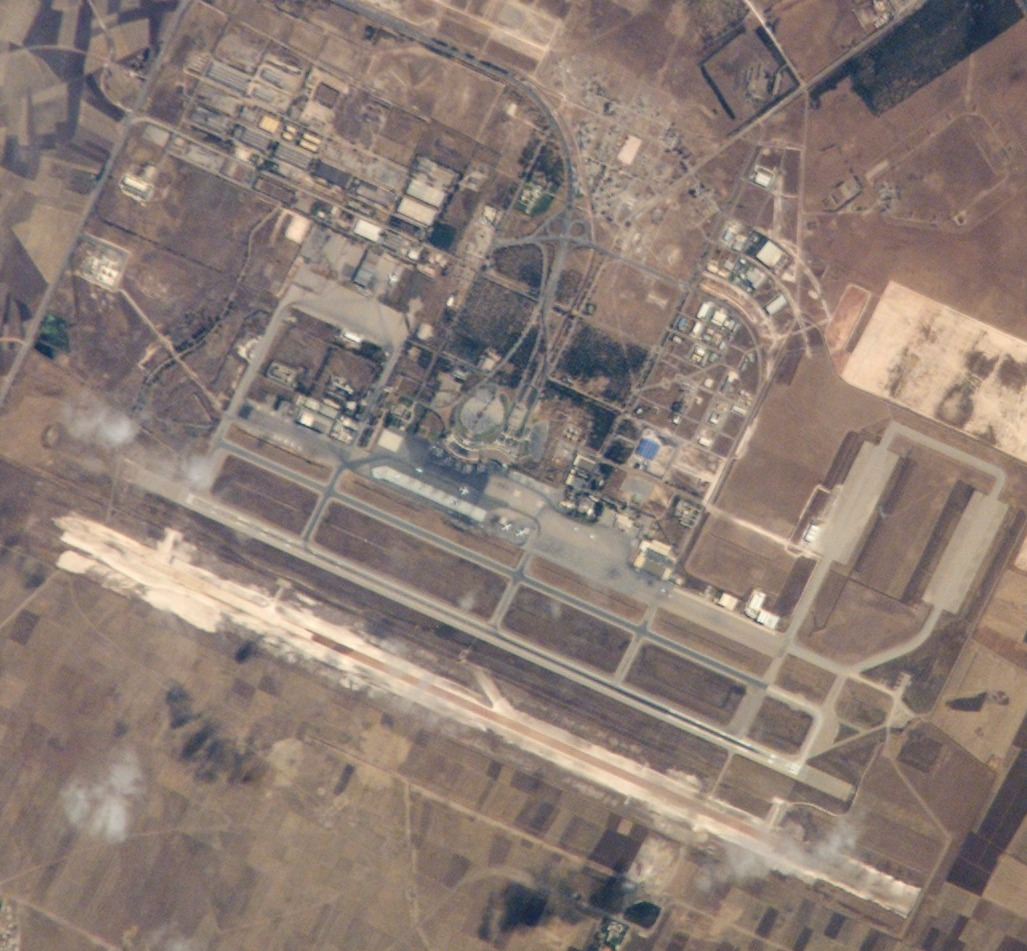
- Aerial photograph of Nouasseur Air Base

Site information
- Type: Air Force Base

Location
- Coordinates: 33°22′00″N 7°35′00″W

Site history
- Built: 1951
- In use: 1951–1963

Nouasseur Air Base (IATA: EVX, ICAO: LFOE) near Casablanca in Morocco, was a United States Air Force base from 1951 to 1963. It was designed for B-36 and B-47 bombers but never came into use, and also housed repair units for a period. Today, Nouasseur AB is known as Mohammed V International Airport. It hosts helicopters of the Royal Moroccan Navy.

== Origins ==
USAF air base siting in the former French protectorate in Morocco developed out of the Allied presence there at the close of World War II. In the early 1950s, SAC developed an "Operation Reflex" strategy between its southern bases and Morocco, with B-36 and B-47 wings rotating to North Africa for extended temporary duty as a staging area for bombers pointed at the Soviet Union.

Initially dispatched was a repair unit, the 80th Air Depot Wing (80 ADW). Brigadier General Wilfred H. Hardy led the wing's transfer from Kelly Air Force Base in March 1951. Replacing the 80th ADW was a MAJCON temporary unit, the 7280th Air Depot Wing. It was activated on 8 June 1953, and served until 1 March 1954. In turn it was replaced by the 3153rd Air Base Wing when the base was transferred to Air Materiel Command. In its turn, the 3153rd ABW was replaced about 1 July 1958 by the 3922d Air Base Group, when the base transferred to SAC.

== SAC use ==
In December 1951, the 118th Aircraft Control and Warning Squadron was transferred to Nouasseur. The majority of the squadron's personnel were located at Nouasseur Air Base, but they also had detachments in the field in the Atlas Mountains and the Sahara Desert. Their mission was to calibrate, set up, and maintain early warning and tactical control radar and radio sites in support of the Strategic Air Command.

Nouasseur Air Base was critically important for SAC during its forward deployment exercises. Nouasseur was quite capable of hosting any of SAC's aircraft, with an asphalt-concrete runway of 12,000 feet (3,700 m). The airfield became operational in July 1951.

The aircraft flown by SAC to Morocco from the United States remained on alert status for a specified number of days, then returned to their CONUS bases. The 5th Air Division never had any assigned combat units, such as wings, only individual aircraft that were assigned to units back in the United States. The 5th Air Division did oversee the 3922d Air Base Group (which later became the 3922 Combat Support Group) as the base operating unit. The division commander also acted as a representative to the Moroccan Liaison Office for the Commander, 16th Air Force.

During the middle and late-1950s, SAC adopted a dispersal program—spreading out its potential as a Soviet target by placing its aircraft, weapons, and personnel on many more bases, with each bombardment wing having two additional installations to which it could disperse. Nouasseur was one of a ring of overseas SAC air bases located from Greenland to North Africa.

In addition, SAC devised a deployment program to use its shorter-range B-47s, which Nouasseur hosted, rotating squadrons on a 90-day basis and kept the aircraft on 15-minute alert for that time period. The overseas bases moved the B-47s into effective range of their targets without aerial refueling.

USAFE F-86 Sabres began flying gunnery training missions during the spring of 1954 from Nouasseur.

The 5th Air Division was inactivated on 15 January 1958. It was replaced by the 4310th Air Division, which remained the host unit until the base closed in 1963.

With the destabilization of the French government in Morocco, and Moroccan independence in 1956, the government of Mohammed V wanted the US Air Force to pull out of the SAC bases in Morocco, insisting on such action after American intervention in Lebanon in 1958.

The United States agreed to leave as of December 1959, and was fully out of Nouasseur Air Base, closing the facility in December 1963.
