= Alison Patteson =

American biophysicist

- Education: Kutztown University; University of Pennsylvania
- Awards: Maria Goeppert-Mayer Award (2024)
- Scientific career
- Fields: Biophysics
- Workplaces: Syracuse University
- Thesis: (2016)

Alison Patteson is a biophysicist at Syracuse University. She is the winner of multiple awards including the 2024 Maria Goeppert-Mayer Award and the Dissertation Award in Statistical and Non-linear Physics from the American Physical Society, as well as the National Science Foundation CAREER Award.

== Career ==
Alison Patteson was interested in mathematics and its applications in undergraduate school. She worked on multiple research projects as an undergraduate including a summer research program at the University of Chicago. Patteson was awarded bachelors degrees in mathematics and physics from Kutztown University in 2011.

In 2016 she earned her doctorate in mechanical engineering and applied mechanics from the University of Pennsylvania. As a result of her graduate work, she was the first recipient of the Dissertation Award in Statistical and Nonlinear Physics of the American Physical Society in 2018. The award cited her work on non-equilibrium systems including active matter and fluid dynamics.

In January 2018 Patteson began work as an assistant professor in the physics department at Syracuse University. She is currently an associate professor in the physics department and also has an affiliation with the biology department.

In 2024 Patteson received the Maria Goeppert-Mayer Award for outstanding research by a woman in physics in the early stages of her career. The award cited her work on the physics of living systems including the mechanics of bacteria movement and the influence of the cell's cytoskeleton on cell functions.

Patteson studies the formation of biofilms, cell migration, the way cells respond to their environment, and other aspects of cellular biomechanics. Her research also includes a focus on the role of the protein vimentin, which forms filaments to protect against damage to the DNA in the cell nucleus after a wound. intermediate filaments, the network of proteins protects the nucleus against deformation, rupture and DNA damage during migration, often present in processes like wound healing. In the wake of the COVID-19 pandemic, Patteson in collaboration with Jennifer Schwarz began researching how antibodies against vimentin could be used to block the uptake of SARS-CoV-2 in cells.

== Honors and awards ==
- 2024 Maria Goeppert-Mayer Award, American Physical Society
- 2023 CAREER Award, National Science Foundation
- 2023 Sloan Research Fellow, Alfred P. Sloan Foundation
- 2023 Cottrell Scholar, Research Corporation
- 2018 Dissertation Award in Statistical and Nonlinear Physics, American Physical Society
- 2012 Graduate Research Fellow, National Science Foundation
