= Alice White (disambiguation) =

Alice White may refer to:

- Alice White (1904–1983), American film actress
- Alice White (physicist), American physicist
- Alice White (rower), (born 1993), British-New Zealand rower
- Alice White (writer) (1908–2007), British-American author
