= Henriette Elvang =

Theoretical particle physicist

- Education: University of California, Santa Barbara; University of Copenhagen
- Scientific career
- Workplaces: University of Michigan; MIT; Institute for Advanced Study
- Thesis: New black holes in string theory (2005)
- Doctoral advisor: Gary Horowitz

Henriette D. Elvang is a Theoretical Particle Physicist and Professor at the University of Michigan. She works on quantum field theory and scattering processes.

== Education and early career ==
Elvang studied physics at the University of Copenhagen. She earned her bachelor's degree in 1998 and her master's degree in 2001. Elvang moved to America for her graduate studies, earning a doctorate at the University of California, Santa Barbara in 2005. She worked on Young projection operators and charged, rotating black rings. Elvang also investigated Kaluza–Klein bubbles and their interactions with black holes. She was a Pappalardo Postdoctoral Fellow at Massachusetts Institute of Technology Center for Theoretical Physics from 2005 to 2008. Elvang identified that black holes and black rings can coexist if they are spinning. She named the combination of a spherical black hole surrounded by a black ring a 'Black Saturn'. After her fellowship, Elvang joined the Institute for Advanced Study as a postdoctoral researcher. She was supported by the United States Department of Energy.

== Research ==
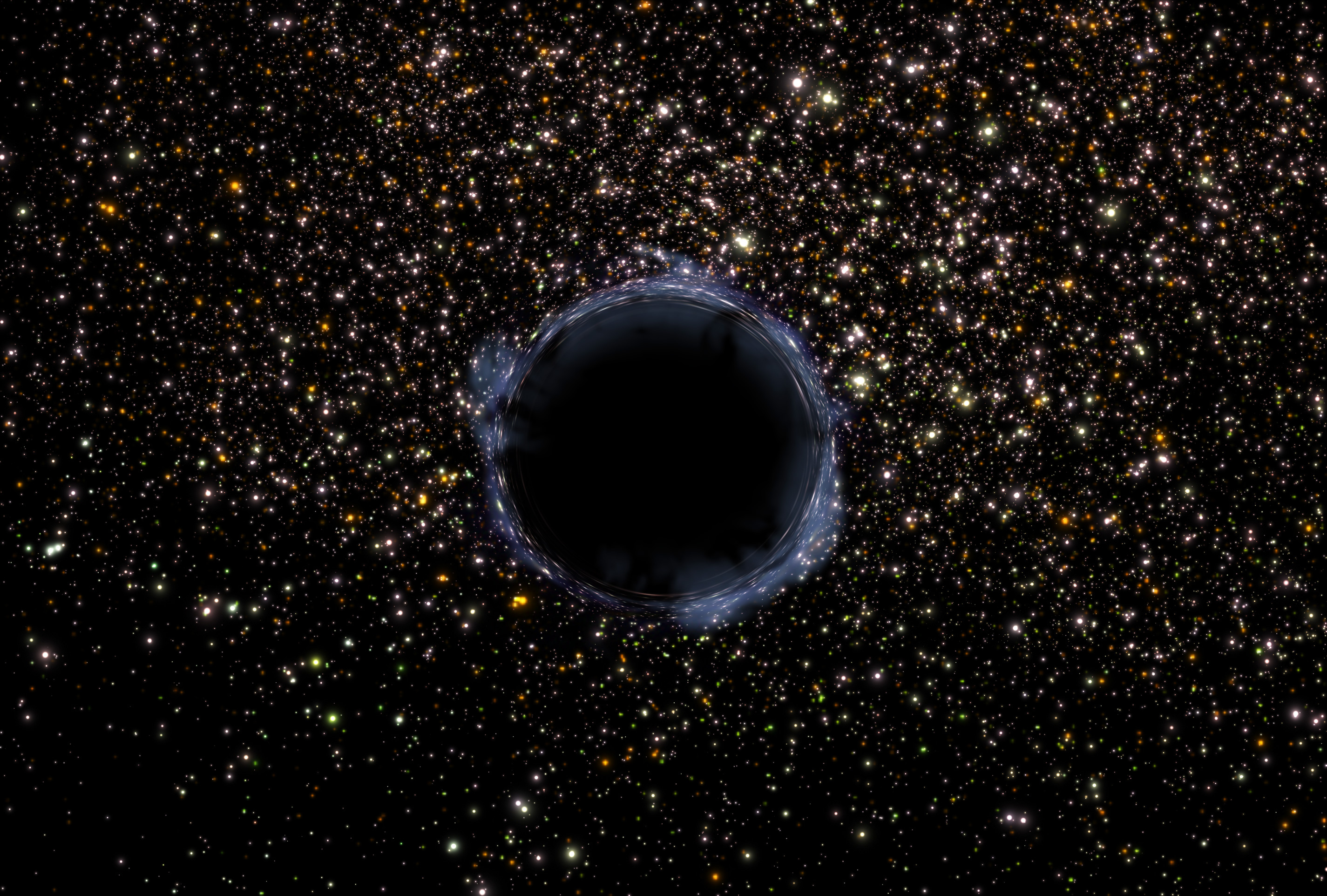
A computer simulation of a black hole

Elvang joined the University of Michigan in 2009 where she works on supersymmetry. She worked on the 4-dimensional spacetime RG flows. She looks to understand quantum gravity and the gauge gravitation correspondence. Elvang described scattering amplitudes using basic quantum field theory, including Feynman rules and Yukawa theory. She uses the spinor helicity formalism. Her work was turned into the first comprehensive textbook on quantum amplitudes, published by Cambridge University Press in 2015. Elvang studies the implications of standard symmetries on ultraviolet divergence in supergravity. She uses the soft bootstrap to constrain effective field theories of massless particles.

Elvang was made a Cottrell Scholar in 2013, developing a sophomore course that taught the value of academic study. The course she developed, Honors Physics Ill/Physics 360: Waves, Heat, and Light, was described by Andrew D. Martin as 'enhancing' the undergraduate course. Elvang developed an exchange program with Bryn Mawr College to attract women into physics research. In 2017 she was promoted to Professor of Physics at the University of Michigan.

She was made a Fellow of the American Physical Society in 2018. Elvang's citation read "for profound insights into gravitational field solutions with novel horizon geometries, the structure of quantum scattering in supersymmetric theories, corner contributions to entanglement entropy, and precision holography".

=== Awards and honours ===
- 2025 University of Michigan, College of Literature, Science, and the Arts, Oskar Klein Collegiate Professor.
- 2021 Class of Fellows of the American Association for the Advancement of Science.
- 2019 University of Michigan, Arthur F. Thurnau Professor, for outstanding contributions to undergraduate education.
- 2018 Fellow of the American Physical Society
- 2017 University of Michigan College of Literature, Science, and Arts John Dewey Award
- 2016 American Physical Society Maria Goeppert Mayer Award
- 2015 University of Michigan Rackham Graduate School Henry Russel Award
- 2014 University of Michigan Individual Award for Outstanding Contributions to Undergraduate Education
- 2013 Research Corporation for Science Advancement Cottrell Scholar
- 2010 NSF CAREER Award
