= Maiken Mikkelsen =

Physicist

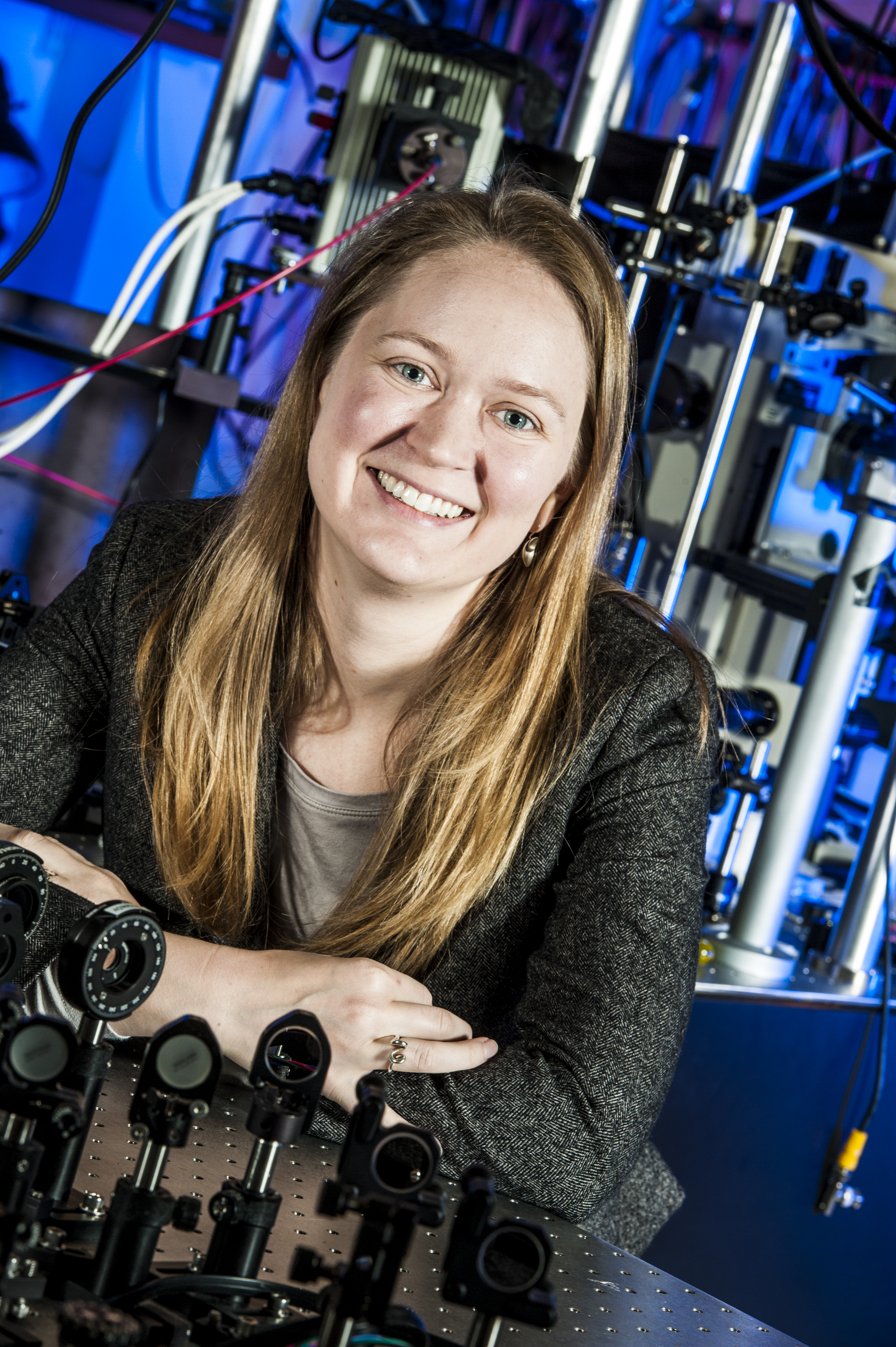
- Mikkelsen in 2014
- Born: Maiken Sophia Høgh Mikkelsen
- Education: University of Copenhagen; University of California, Santa Barbara
- Scientific career
- Fields: Physics
- Workplaces: University of California, Berkeley; Duke University
- Thesis: Optical detection and manipulation of single electron spin coherence in a semiconductor quantum dot (2009)
- Doctoral advisor: David Awschalom

Maiken Sophia Høgh Mikkelsen is a Danish physicist, who is the James N. and Elizabeth H. Barton Associate Professor in Electrical and Computer Engineering at Duke University, where she is also an associate professor of physics. In 2017, she received the Maria Goeppert Mayer Award from the American Physical Society for her work in quantum nanophotonics. Her research interests include optoelectronics, nanophotonics, and their applications to human health and the environment.

== Education ==
Maiken Mikkelsen received her B.S. in physics in 2004 from the University of Copenhagen. She received her Ph.D. in physics in 2009 from the University of California, Santa Barbara, where she studied single electron spin dynamics in semiconductors for her Ph.D. thesis and for which she won the 2011 Thesis Prize from the Quantum Electronics and Optical Division (QEOD) of the European Physical Society. She did a postdoctoral research fellowship at the University of California at Berkeley before joining the faculty at Duke University in 2012.

== Research interests ==
Mikkelsen's research focuses on light–matter interactions in nanophotonic structures, quantum materials, and novel multi-scale fabrication techniques. Her recent work in "Extreme Nanophotonics" aims to realize unprecedented material properties and behavior by sculpting electromagnetic fields on the molecular scale.

== List of awards and honors ==
- MURI Award (PI), AFOSR (2021)
- Stansell Family Distinguished Research Award, Duke University (2021)
- American Chemical Society (ACS) Photonics Young Investigator Award (2020)
- Moore Inventor Fellow Award, Gordon and Betty Moore Foundation (2019)
- National Institutes of Health (NIH) RO1 Award (2019)
- Maria Goeppert Mayer Award, American Physical Society (2017)
- Early Career Achievement Award, SPIE (International Society for Optics and Photonics) (2017)
- Young Investigator Program (YIP) Award, Office of Naval Research (2017)
- Young Investigator Program (YIP) Award, Army Research Office (2016)
- Cottrell Scholar Award, Research Corporation for Science Advancement (2016)
- Scialog Fellow, Research Corporation for Science Advancement (2016)
- CAREER Award, National Science Foundation (2015)
- Young Investigator Program (YIP) Award, Air Force Office of Scientific Research (2015)
- Ralph E. Powe Junior Faculty Award (2014)
- European Physical Society Ph.D. Thesis prize, Quantum Electronics and Optics (2011)
- NSF ADVANCE Award, Workshop for Women in Science & Engineering (2009)
- Center for Nanoscience Innovation for Defense (CNID) Graduate Fellowship (2007)

== Major scientific achievements ==
Revealed record-high spontaneous emission rates. Elucidated the mechanisms behind large Purcell factors and demonstrated record-high 1,000-fold enhancement in the spontaneous emission rate of dye molecules and semiconductor quantum dots (Nature Photonics 8, 835 (2014), Nature Communications 6, 7788 (2015)).

Realized first ultrafast and efficient single photon source. Realized this long-sought goal by embedding single quantum dots in plasmonic cavities. Critical to quantum information and quantum optics communities, as the natural slow emission rate of single photon sources is a limiting factor for many experiments and future applications (Nano Letters 16, 270 (2016)).

Demonstrated first ultrafast, spectrally-selective thermal photodetector. Utilized metasurfaces to create spectrally-selective perfect absorption enabling the use of an only 100 nm pyroelectric thermal detection layer and revealing speeds of <700 ps, an improvement of five-orders-of-magnitude over state-of-the-art. The metasurface also acts as an on-chip spectral filter promising for hyperspectral imaging (Nature Materials 19, 158 (2020)).

Created novel multi-scale fabrication technique to realize large-area structural color. Utilized chemical self-assembly to achieve sub-10 nm gaps between metals demonstrating spectrally selective perfect absorbers. Combined this with top-down large-scale patterning to realize multispectral pixels and approximately 10,000 plasmonic combinatorial colors. This work shows promise for breakthroughs in photodetectors and imaging devices (Advanced Materials 27, 8028 (2015), Advanced Materials 29, 1602971 (2017)).

Explained the benefit of nanogap cavities for point-of-care immunoassays. Integrated a sandwich immunoassay microarray within a plasmonic nanogap cavity resulting in a 151-fold increase in fluorescence and 14-fold improvement in the limit-of-detection for the cardiac biomarker B-type natriuretic peptide (BNP). (Nano Letters 20, 4330 (2020), Advanced Materials 35, 2107986 (2023)).

== Publications ==
Her most cited publications are:

- Akselrod, Gleb M.; Argyropoulos, Christos; Hoang, Thang B.; Ciracì, Cristian; Fang, Chao; Huang, Jiani; Smith, David R.; Mikkelsen, Maiken H. (2014-10-12). "Probing the mechanisms of large Purcell enhancement in plasmonic nanoantennas". Nature Photonics. 8 (11). Springer Science and Business Media LLC: 835–840. Bibcode:2014NaPho...8..835A. doi:10.1038/nphoton.2014.228. ISSN 1749-4885. S2CID 31055460. (cited 1118 times according to Google Scholar
- Zentgraf, Thomas; Liu, Yongmin; Mikkelsen, Maiken H.; Valentine, Jason; Zhang, Xiang (2011-01-23). "Plasmonic Luneburg and Eaton lenses". Nature Nanotechnology. 6 (3). Springer Science and Business Media LLC: 151–155. arXiv:1101.2493. Bibcode:2011NatNa...6..151Z. doi:10.1038/nnano.2010.282. ISSN 1748-3387. PMID 21258334. S2CID 8773190. (cited 376 times according to Google Scholar)
- Hoang, Thang B.; Akselrod, Gleb M.; Argyropoulos, Christos; Huang, Jiani; Smith, David R.; Mikkelsen, Maiken H. (2015-07-27). "Ultrafast spontaneous emission source using plasmonic nanoantennas". Nature Communications. 6 (1). Springer Science and Business Media LLC: 7788. Bibcode:2015NatCo...6.7788H. doi:10.1038/ncomms8788. ISSN 2041-1723. PMC 4525280. PMID 26212857. (cited 498 times according to Google Scholar)
- Yang, Ankun; Hoang, Thang B.; Dridi, Montacer; Deeb, Claire; Mikkelsen, Maiken H.; Schatz, George C.; Odom, Teri W. (2015-04-20). "Real-time tunable lasing from plasmonic nanocavity arrays". Nature Communications. 6 (1). Springer Science and Business Media LLC: 6939. Bibcode:2015NatCo...6.6939Y. doi:10.1038/ncomms7939. ISSN 2041-1723. PMC 4411284. PMID 25891212. (cited 463 times according to Google Scholar)
- Hoang, Thang B.; Akselrod, Gleb M.; Mikkelsen, Maiken H. (2015-12-09). "Ultrafast Room-Temperature Single Photon Emission from Quantum Dots Coupled to Plasmonic Nanocavities". Nano Letters. 16 (1). American Chemical Society (ACS): 270–275. Bibcode:2016NanoL..16..270H. doi:10.1021/acs.nanolett.5b03724. ISSN 1530-6984. PMID 26606001. (cited 488 times according to Google Scholar)
