= Wennie Wang =

American materials scientist

- Education: Massachusetts Institute of Technology; University of California, Santa Barbara
- Awards: Maria Goeppert-Mayer Award (2025)
- Scientific career
- Fields: Materials science
- Workplaces: University of Chicago; University of Texas at Austin
- Thesis: (2018)
- Doctoral advisor: Chris G. Van de Walle

Wennie Wang is a materials scientist at the University of Texas at Austin. She is the winner of multiple awards including the 2025 Maria Goeppert-Mayer Award from the American Physical Society. Her research work focuses on the optoelectronic properties of novel materials through the development and application of first-principles computational methods.

== Career ==
Wennie Wang completed her undergraduate education at the Massachusetts Institute of Technology in 2013 with a degree in Material Sciences and Engineering. She then earned her Ph.D. in 2018 at the University of California, Santa Barbara under the direction of Chris G. Van de Walle.

From 2018 to 2021 Wang worked as a postdoctoral researcher at the Pritzker School of Molecular Engineering at the University of Chicago under Giulia Galli. In this role she used quantum mechanical calculations to study the properties of bismuth vanadate, a photoelectrode material that can be used to create a solar fuel.

In 2021 Wang started work as an assistant professor in the McKetta Department of Chemical Engineering at the University of Texas at Austin. She also is affiliated with the Allen J. Bard Center for Electrochemistry, the Center for Dynamics and Control of Materials (a National Science Foundation Materials Research Science and Engineering Center), the Oden Institute for Computational Engineering and Sciences, and the Texas Materials Institute.

Wang and her research group at the University of Texas Austin use first-principles computational methods to study novel semiconductor material. Wang's research particularly focuses on the optical and electronic properties produced by defects in transition metal compounds.

In 2025 Wang received the Maria Goeppert-Mayer Award of the American Physical Society (APS) for outstanding research by a woman in physics in the early stages of her career. The award cited her "outstanding contributions to the field of materials science, including pioneering research on defective transition metal oxides for energy sustainability, a commitment to broadening participation of underrepresented groups in computational materials science, and leadership and advocacy in the scientific community."

Wang has also been involved in various roles outside her primary institution and has especially focused on the status of early career scientists. Because of her work in this and other areas, she has received the 2024 Reviewer Excellence Award for PRX Energy and the 2023 5 Sigma Physicist Honor. In 2025 she became one of the first early career board members of the American Chemical Society (ACS) journal Applied Electronic Materials. She also served as a member-at-large and as chair of the Forum for Early Career Scientists of the APS.

== Honors and awards ==
- 2025 Maria Goeppert-Mayer Award, APS
- 2024 Reviewer Excellence Award for PRX Energy, APS
- 2023 5 Sigma Physicist Honor, APS
- 2018 Ken Hass Outstanding Student Paper Award for Industrial Applications, Runner-up, APS
- 2017–2018 Excellence in Research Fellowship, Institute for Energy Efficiency
- 2017 Fall Graduate Student Award finalist, Silver Award, Materials Research Society
- 2014 Graduate Research Fellow, National Science Foundation
- 2013–2014 Holbrook Foundation Fellowship, Institute for Energy Efficiency
