= M. Lisa Manning =

American physicist (born 1980)

- Born: September 5, 1980; Cincinnati, Ohio, United States
- Spouse: William Wylie
- Awards: AAAS Fellow; Sloan Research Fellowship; Simons Investigators Award; Maria Goeppert-Mayer Award
- Scientific career
- Thesis: Effective temperature and strain localization in amorphous solids (2004)
- Doctoral advisor: Jean Carlson
- Website: https://mmanning.expressions.syr.edu

Mary Lisa Manning (born 1980) is an American physicist and the William R. Kenan, Jr., Professor of Physics at Syracuse University in Syracuse, New York, United States. Manning's research focuses on the behavior of glassy materials, using simulations and theory to model the emergent properties of biological tissues.

== Background ==
Manning grew up in Kentucky, near Cincinnati, Ohio and attended the University of Virginia as a Jefferson Scholar, graduating in 2002 with bachelor's degrees in physics and mathematics. She earned a Ph.D. in physics from the University of California at Santa Barbara in 2008, followed by a postdoctoral fellowship at the Princeton University Center for Theoretical Science. In 2011, Manning accepted a faculty position at Syracuse University. In 2020, Manning was named the William R. Kenan, Jr., Professor of Physics at the same university.

Manning is married to William Wylie and has two children.

== Research ==
As a graduate student, Manning studied the behaviors and properties of disordered solids and glasses under the mentorship of Jean Carlson. Among other findings, she described how effective temperature is an important determinant of material failure and strain localization, with potential applications for a wide range of amorphous materials.

After earning her Ph.D., Manning expanded her research on amorphous and granular solids to include biological cells, noting that many types of tissues behave as though they were glassy solids. Manning has developed a model describing the relationship between cell adhesion and cortical tension as a determinant for embryonic surface tension. Her ongoing research modeling the relationship between cell shape and jamming leading to tissue rigidity has implications for cell migration in metastatic cancer, wound healing, embryogenesis, and asthma. In addition, Manning has continued to explore the dynamics of conventional disordered solids. In 2018, Manning was named by Science News as one of 2018's 10 scientists to watch.

== Honors and awards ==
- 2014 Faculty Early Career Development Program (CAREER) Award, National Science Foundation
- 2014 Research Fellow, Alfred P. Sloan Foundation.
- 2015 Cottrell Scholar, Research Corporation for Science Advancement.
- 2015 Scialog Fellow Research Corporation for Science Advancement.
- 2016 Simons Foundation Investigators Award.
- 2016 International Union of Pure and Applied Physics Young Investigator Prize.
- 2018 Maria Goeppert Mayer Award Recipient
- 2026 Fellows of the American Association for the Advancement of Science
