= Yifei Mo =

Materials scientist

Yifei Mo is a professor in the Department of Materials Science and Engineering (MSE) at the University of Maryland.

== Education ==
He completed an MSc and Ph.D. in materials science at the University of Wisconsin, Madison in 2008 and 2010, respectively. He went on to become a postdoctoral research associate in the Materials Science and Engineering department at the Massachusetts Institute of Technology from 2010 until 2013.

== Career ==
In 2013, Yifei Mo joined the faculty of the Department of Materials Science and Engineering (MSE) at the University of Maryland. He was promoted to Associate Professor with tenure in 2019 and full Professor in 2024. Yifei Mo is internationally renowned for his work in theoretical and computational modeling of advanced materials for energy storage and conversion. Since joining the University of Maryland, he has spearheaded a new research group in computational materials science. He made significant research contributions in computational techniques based on quantum mechanisms, and machine learning to understand, discover, and design advanced renewable energy materials, including next generation Li-ion batteries.

== Awards and honors ==
- Scialog Fellow of Advanced Energy Storage, Research Corporation Foundation, 2017
- 3M Non-Tenured Faculty Award, 3M, 2019
- Outstanding Young Scientist Award, Maryland Academy of Sciences, 2019
- Junior Faculty Outstanding Research Award, 2022
- World’s top 2% scientists (based on single-year citation) by the Stanford University list, 2022
- Highly Cited Researchers by Clarivate, 2021, 2022 and 2023
- 2024 Early Career Award
