= Stephanie Law =

Stephanie Law may refer to:

- Stephanie Pui-Mun Law (born 1976), American fantasy artist
- Stephanie Law (materials scientist), American researcher
