= Eli Rotenberg =

American physicist

Eli Rotenberg is an American physicist. He works at the Advanced Light Source (ALS) synchrotron, and was named a fellow of the American Physical Society in recognition of his work in photoemission spectroscopy.

== Career ==
Rotenberg studied at Cornell University, and obtained a BS in 1987. He conducted his PhD studies at the University of California, Berkeley, and graduated in 1993 with a thesis entitled "The Relationship Between Structure and Core-Level Shifts in Thin Epitaxial Films of CaF2 and SrF2 on Si(111)". His thesis advisor was Marjorie Olmstead. Rotenberg then moved to the University of Oregon for postdoctoral work. In 1996, he became a staff scientist at ALS at the Lawrence Berkeley National Laboratory, where he has continued to work as of 2025. In this position, he serves as the project leader of the MAESTRO (Microscopic and Electronic STRucture Observatory) beamline.

== Awards and honors ==
- 2001 Peter Mark Memorial Award of the American Vacuum Society for "furthering our knowledge of nanophase and reduced dimensionality systems by creative use of angle-resolved photoemission."
- 2008 Fellow of the American Physical Society for "outstanding contributions to the understanding of quantum electronic properties of nanophase and reduced dimensionality systems by creative applications of angle-resolved photoemission spectroscopy."
- 2009 Inaugural Kai Siegbahn Award
- 2010 Vacuum Ultraviolet and X-ray Physics Prize
- Davisson–Germer Prize with Stephen Kevan "For the development of angle resolved photoemission spectroscopy (ARPES) leading to groundbreaking surface science."
