= Randall Feenstra =

Randall Feenstra may refer to:

- Randall M. Feenstra, physicist
- Randy Feenstra (born 1969), American politician
