= Yuri Suzuki =

Yuri Suzuki may refer to:

- Yuri Suzuki (physicist)
- Yuri Suzuki (designer)
