= Jerry Tersoff =

American physicist

Jerry Tersoff is a Research Staff Member at the IBM Thomas J. Watson Research Center. His work spans diverse topics in the theoretical understanding of surfaces, interfaces, electronic materials, epitaxial growth, and nanoscale devices. Throughout his career, his work has emphasized the use of simple models to understand complex behavior.

== Awards and honors ==
- 1988 Peter Mark Memorial award "For innovative approaches to the theoretical understanding of the electronic structure, properties, and measurement of surfaces and interfaces."
- 1996 MRS Medal "For seminal contributions to the theory of strain relaxation in thin films."
- 1997 Davisson–Germer Prize in Atomic or Surface Physics "For insightful, creative theoretical descriptions of surface phenomenology; particularly of crystal growth dynamics, surface structures and their probes."
- 2007 Medard W. Welch Award "For seminal theoretical contributions to the understanding of surfaces, interfaces, thin films and nanostructures of electronic materials."
- 2018 National Academy of Engineering "For theoretical contributions to the engineering science of materials growth and modeling, nanoscale electronic devices, and semiconductor interfaces."
- 2019 Materials Research Society Von Hippel Award "For advancing the understanding of low-dimensional and nanoscale electronic materials, surfaces and interfaces, through elegant theoretical models that highlight the essential physics controlling growth, structure and electronic properties."

== See also ==
- Bond order potential
