= Matthew Tirrell =

American chemical engineer (born 1950)

Matthew V. Tirrell
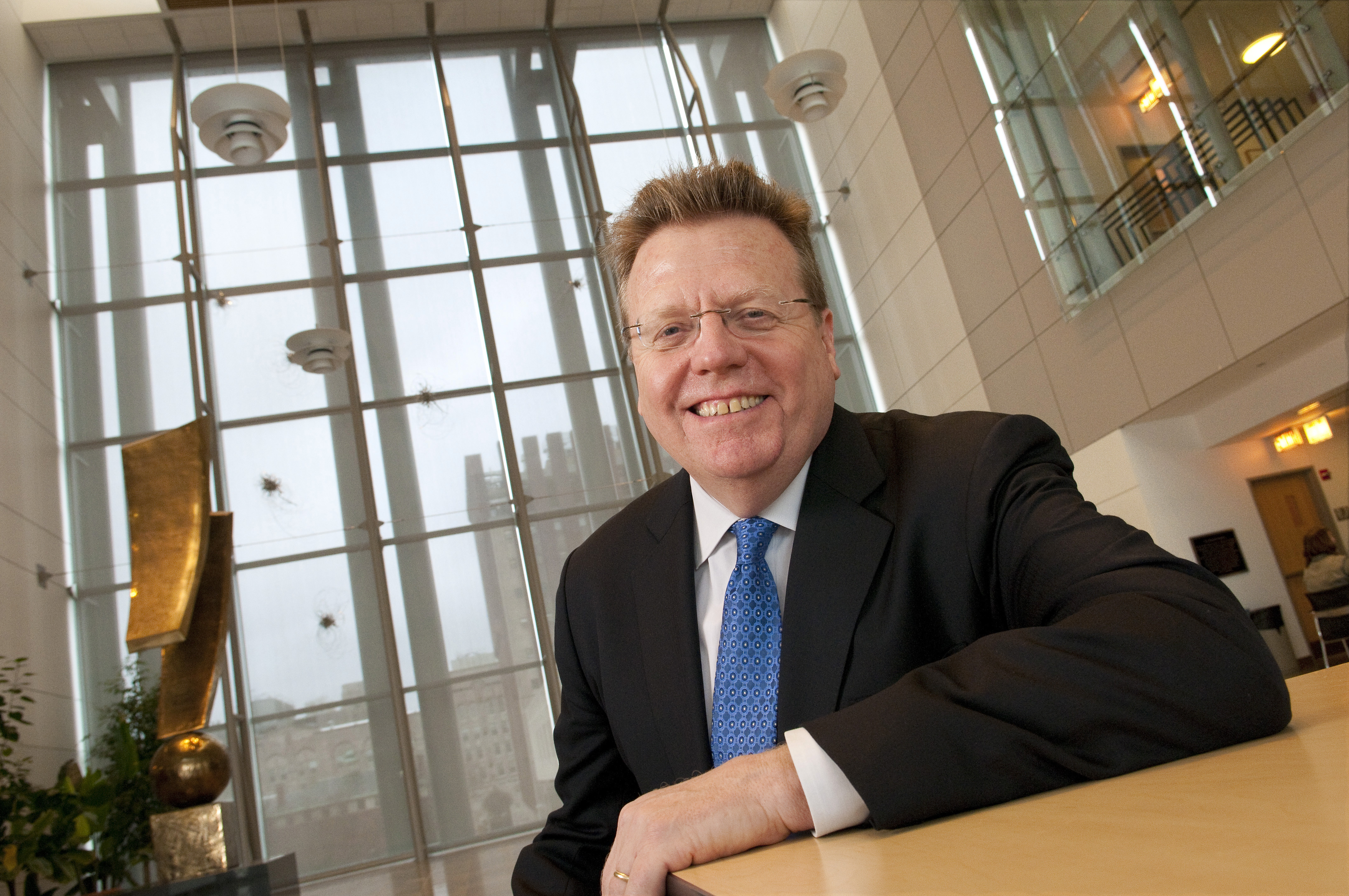
- Born: 5 September 1950 (age 76); Phillipsburg, New Jersey, U.S.
- Education: University of Massachusetts Amherst, Northwestern University
- Scientific career
- Fields: polymer science, molecular engineering, nanotechnology
- Workplaces: University of Chicago, Argonne National Laboratory, University of California, Berkeley, Lawrence Berkeley National Laboratory, University of California, Santa Barbara, University of Minnesota

Matthew V. Tirrell (born 5 September 1950) is an American chemical engineer. In 2011 he became the founding Pritzker Director and dean of the Institute for Molecular Engineering at the University of Chicago in addition to serving as senior scientist at Argonne National Laboratory. Tirrell's research specializes in the manipulation and measurement of polymer surface properties, polyelectrolyte complexation, and biomedical nanoparticles.

In 2019, IME became the Pritzker School of Molecular Engineering at the University of Chicago and Tirrell was named Robert A. Millikan Distinguished Service Professor and Dean. In January 2023, Tirrell was named D. Gale Johnson Distinguished Service Professor. In October 2023, Tirrell stepped out of the PME Dean position and became D. Gale Johnson Distinguished Service Professor Emeritus, while continuing to lead a research group of fifteen members.

== Early life and education ==
Tirrell was born in Phillipsburg, New Jersey on September 5, 1950. He received a bachelor's degree in Chemical Engineering (B.S. Ch.E.) in 1973 Northwestern University, and a Ph.D. in 1977 from University of Massachusetts Amherst in Polymer Science and Engineering under Stanley Middleman. Matthew Tirrell and Pamela LaVigne were married in St. Paul, Minnesota in 1993.

== Career ==
In 1977, Tirrell became an assistant professor in the department of chemical engineering and materials science at the University of Minnesota, receiving promotions through the academic ranks and serving as the head of the department from 1995 to 1999. In 1999, he moved to the University of California, Santa Barbara, where was Richard A. Auhll Professor and dean of the college of engineering. In 2009, he moved to the University of California, Berkeley as Arnold and Barbara Silverman Professor and chair of the department of bioengineering, as well as a professor of materials science and engineering and chemical engineering and a faculty scientist in the Materials Science Division at Lawrence Berkeley National Laboratory.

In 2011, Tirrell became the founding Pritzker Director and dean of the Institute for Molecular Engineering (IME) at the University of Chicago. In September 2015, he was appointed as the deputy laboratory director for science at Argonne National Laboratory. He stepped out of this role in April 2018. Tirrell returned to Argonne as interim deputy laboratory director from June 2022 to October 2023, at which time he became senior advisor as well as continuing as senior scientist.

== Research ==
The early work in Tirrell's career focused on the behavior of macromolecules in physically confined spaces, in which both the structure and motion of the macromolecule are constrained and distorted by the confining boundaries. For example, the apparent viscosity of a macromolecular solution can be lower because the centers-of-mass of the macromolecules cannot get close to the wall, giving rise to a low viscosity depletion layer (a similar phenomenon occurs, albeit at larger scales, in blood flow in narrow vessels). Tirrell was responsible for developing a quantitative, predictive theoretical picture of this type of phenomenon and comparing it with experimental rheological results. His papers describing this research have collectively been cited more than 1000 times.

Tirrell's interest in polymer confinement led to the investigation of what happens when polymers stick (adhere, adsorb) to the walls confining them. His research group became especially interested in a prediction made in the late 1970s by Pierre-Gilles de Gennes, about the situation where a polymer molecule is tethered by its end to a surface but no other segments were attracted to the surface, a situation that has become known as a polymer brush. De Gennes predicted that a dense layer of such end-tethered chains would result in the chains stretching out normal to the tethering surface to a high degree, resulting in a surface that is resistant to adhesion and has very low friction. Tirrell conceived and implemented the first experimental system to test these predictions by adsorbing block copolymers, and demonstrated the theoretically anticipated stretching and long-range repulsion. His interest in this field, amassing more than 3500 citations, continues today, especially in the area of charged polymer brushes, which are bio-medically relevant in situations such as mucosal and cartilage surfaces.

Eventually, Tirrell's work on block copolymers led him to starting research in the field of peptide amphiphiles. In the field of tissue engineering, in the early 1990s, the idea of adding ingredients, such as cell adhesion peptides (e.g., RGD) to surfaces and matrices was being developed. Tirrell realized that the majority of the ways that such molecules were being presented was very haphazard and uncontrolled. His research group began to explore the idea of conjugating peptides to lipids in order to use the self-assembly character of lipids to direct a controlled presentation of peptides. This has led to current work in peptide amphiphile micelles, which are versatile, modular, biofunctional nanoparticles that can be injected into the circulation to target, image and, in some cases, treat pathological conditions. The Tirrell group has active work now in using such particles to diagnose and treat atherosclerosis, and also to stimulate the adaptive immune system to generate desired B-cell and T-cell responses.

The other principal area of Tirrell's current work, in addition to peptide amphiphiles, is in the generation of new materials and functional assemblies via polyelectrolyte complexation. Under the right conditions, oppositely charged polyelectrolyte chains can assemble into flexible, fluid complexes. Such fluids (sometimes known as coacervates) have very low interfacial tension with water so they are very useful as encapsulants and also as agents to drive self-assembly in aqueous systems. Tirrell's research group has been exploring these materials and assemblies in a variety of biomedical applications such as micelle formation, encapsulation and hydrogel formation. A specific recent development has been in the assembly of polyelectrolyte complex micelles with nucleic acid cores to treat cardiovascular conditions arising from inflammation.

== Awards and honors ==
- 2026 Member, National Academy of Medicine
- 2022 American Chemical Society National Award in Colloid Chemistry
- 2019 Docteur Honoris Causa, Université de Bordeaux
- 2019 Member, National Academy of Sciences
- 2012 Polymer Physics Prize, American Physical Society
- 2009 Chevalier dans l'Ordre des Palmes Académiques (Ministry of Education of France, "pour services rendus à la culture française")
- 2009 Fellow, American Academy of Arts & Sciences
- 2008 Member, Indian National Academy of Engineering
- 2007 William H. Walker Award, American Institute of Chemical Engineers
- 2001 Institute Lecturer, American Institute of Chemical Engineers
- 2000 Fellow, American Association for the Advancement of Science
- 1998 Fellow, American Institute of Medical and Biological Engineering
- 1997 Member, National Academy of Engineering
- 1996 Charles M. A. Stine Award, American Institute of Chemical Engineers
- 1994 Andreas Acrivos Award for Professional Progress Award, American Institute of Chemical Engineers
- 1987 Fellow, American Physical Society
- 1987 John H. Dillon Medal, American Physical Society
