= Stacey Bent =

Professor of chemical engineering at Stanford University

Stacey F. Bent
- Education: University of California, Berkeley (B.S); Stanford University (Ph.D.)
- Known for: surface chemistry; atomic layer deposition
- Awards: National Academy of Engineering (2020)
- Scientific career
- Fields: Chemical Engineering
- Workplaces: Stanford University
- Doctoral advisor: Richard Zare
- Website: bentgroup.stanford.edu

Stacey Bent is a professor of chemical engineering and vice provost for graduate education and postdoctoral affairs (VPGE) at Stanford University. She is the Jagdeep and Roshni Singh Professor of Engineering, the Bert and Candace Forbes University Fellow in Undergraduate Education, and a member of the National Academy of Engineering. She was the director of the TomKat Center for Sustainable Energy and a senior associate dean in the Stanford School of Engineering until 2019. She is best known for contributions to semiconductor processing, materials chemistry, and surface science. Her work has been applied toward applications in semiconductors, solar cells, and catalysts.

== Education and career ==
Bent graduated from U.C. Berkeley in 1987 with a B.S., summa cum laude, in chemical engineering. She earned a Ph.D. in chemistry from Stanford in 1992, advised by Richard Zare. Her thesis studied the dynamics of how hydrogen atoms recombine and desorb molecularly from silicon surfaces, and has since played a significant role in the current understanding of hydrogen interactions with silicon surfaces.

She was a postdoctoral fellow at AT&T Bell Laboratories and an assistant professor of chemistry at New York University before moving to Stanford University in 1998.

At Stanford, Bent holds courtesy appointments in the departments of materials science and engineering, electrical engineering, and chemistry. She was the department chair of chemical engineering from 2015 to 2016 and senior associate dean in the school of engineering from 2016 to 2019 before her current position as a vice provost.

She was the director of the TomKat Center for Sustainable Energy from 2010 to 2019. She is also a senior fellow at the Stanford Precourt Institute for Energy. She is a fellow of the American Chemical Society and the American Vacuum Society.

She has received numerous awards for her research and teaching, including the Beckman Young Investigator Award, the Camille Dreyfus Teacher-Scholar Award, the Peter Mark Memorial award, a National Science Foundation CAREER Award, and a Tau Beta Pi Award for Excellence in Undergraduate Teaching. In 2018, she received the American Chemical Society Award in Surface Chemistry.

Bent was elected as a member of the National Academy of Engineering in 2020 for contributions to materials surface chemistry and its application across technology platforms from energy to electronics.

== Research ==
Bent’s work focuses on interfacial chemistry and materials synthesis, with a variety of applications in semiconductor processing, microelectronics, nanotechnology, and renewable energy. Her research group utilizes systems in atomic layer deposition, functionalization of semiconductor surfaces, nanoscale materials for light absorption, and catalyst and electrocatalyst development.
