= William R. Simpson =

Bill Simpson
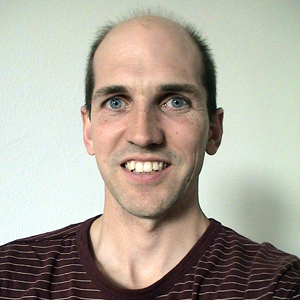
- Born: July 25, 1966 (age 60)
- Citizenship: United States
- Education: Swarthmore College (BA, 1988); Stanford University (PhD, 1995)
- Known for: Cavity ring-down spectroscopy, Snowpack photochemistry, Stratospheric ozone
- Awards: NSF CAREER Grant Award (2001-2006), Research Innovation Award of the Research Corporation for cavity ring-down spectroscopy (1999), Flavored Ice Award for revolutionary snow flavoring techniques
- Scientific career
- Fields: Chemistry
- Workplaces: University of Alaska Fairbanks
- Doctoral advisor: Richard N. Zare

William R. Simpson (born July 25, 1966) is an American chemist. He is a pioneer in the field of snow chemistry. He is also a current researcher at University of Alaska Fairbanks' Geophysical Institute and International Arctic Research Center and an associate professor in the chemistry department. He is the principal investigator of the atmospheric chemistry group and director of the university's NSF Research Experience for Undergraduates program.

== Education ==
Bill attained his B.A. in chemistry at Swarthmore College in 1988 and his Ph.D. in physical chemistry at Stanford University in 1995.

== Awards ==
- CAREER Grant Award of the National Science Foundation (NSF) 2001-2006
- Research Innovation Award for cavity ring-down spectroscopy, Research Corporation 1999
- Flavored Ice Award for revolutionary snow flavoring techniques

== Research ==
- Cavity ring-down spectroscopy
- Snowpack photochemistry
- Stratospheric ozone

== Selected publications ==
Simpson has more than 40 papers in peer-reviewed journals.

- Simpson, W. R., L. Alvarez-Aviles, T. A. Douglas, M. Sturm, and F. Domine (2005), Halogens in the coastal snow pack near Barrow, Alaska: Evidence for active bromine air-snow chemistry during springtime, Geophys. Res. Lett., 32, L04811.
- Ayers, J. D., and W. R. Simpson (2006), Measurements of N_{2}O_{5} near Fairbanks, Alaska, J. Geophys. Res., 111, D14309.
- Ayers, J. D., R. L. Apodaca, W. R. Simpson, and D. S. Baer (2005), Off-axis cavity ringdown spectroscopy: application to atmospheric nitrate radical detection, Appl. Optics., 44, 7239-7242.
