= Pritzker School of Molecular Engineering =

Graduate school of the University of Chicago

University of Chicago Pritzker School of Molecular Engineering
- Type: Private
- Established: 2011 (Institute of Molecular Engineering); 2019 (Pritzker School of Molecular Engineering)
- Parent institution: University of Chicago
- Dean: Stuart Rowan, Interim Dean https://pme.uchicago.edu/news-events/news/stuart-rowan-named-interim-dean-uchicago-pritzker-school-molecular-engineering (As of July 9, 2026)]
- Location: Chicago, Illinois, United States, United States of America
- Campus: Urban
- Website: pme.uchicago.edu

The University of Chicago Pritzker School of Molecular Engineering (UChicago PME) is the first school of an engineering discipline at the University of Chicago. It was founded as the Institute for Molecular Engineering in 2011 by the university in partnership with Argonne National Laboratory. When the program was raised to the status of a school in 2019, it became the first school dedicated to molecular engineering in the United States. It is named for a major benefactor, the Pritzker Foundation.

The scientists, engineers, and students at PME use scientific research to pursue engineering solutions to some of humanity's biggest challenges. The school does not have departments. Instead, it organizes its research around interdisciplinary “themes”: immuno-engineering, quantum engineering, and energy and sustainability. PME works toward technological advancements in areas of global importance, including sustainable energy and natural resources, immunotherapy-based approaches to cancer, “unhackable” communications networks, and a clean global water supply. The school plans to expand its research areas to address more issues of global importance.

== History ==
The Institute of Molecular Engineering (IME) was established in 2011, after three years of discussion and review. It was the largest academic program founded by the University of Chicago since 1988, when the Harris School of Public Policy Studies was established.

Matthew Tirrell was appointed founding Pritzker Director of IME in July 2011. The Pritzker Directorship honors the Pritzker Foundation, which donated a large gift in support of the institute. Tirrell is a researcher in biomolecular engineering and nanotechnology. His honors include election to the National Academy of Engineering, the American Academy of Arts and Sciences, and the National Academy of Sciences. He became dean of PME in 2019.

The William Eckhardt Research Center (WERC), which houses the school and part of the Physical Sciences Division, was constructed between 2011 and 2015. The WERC was named for alumnus William Eckhardt, in recognition of his donation to support scientific research at the university.

In 2019, the school received more than $23.1 million in research funding. From 2011 to 2019, faculty at the school have filed 69 invention disclosures and have created six companies.

On May 28, 2019, the University of Chicago announced a $100 million commitment from the Pritzker Foundation to support the institute's transition to a school—the first school of molecular engineering in the U.S. The Pritzker Foundation helped establish the school with a new donation of $75 million, adding to an earlier $25 million donation that supported the institute and the construction of the Pritzker Nanofabrication Facility. In 2019, PME became the university's first new school in three decades.

On October 1, 2023, physicist Nadya Mason was appointed Dean of UChicago PME, succeeding Founding Dean Matthew J. Tirrell.

On July 9, 2026, chemist Stuart Rowan was appointed Interim Dean of UChicago PME.

== Education ==
UChicago PME offers a graduate program in molecular engineering for both Master and Ph.D. students, as well as an undergraduate major and minor in molecular engineering offered with the College of the University of Chicago.

The institute began accepting applications to its doctoral program in fall 2013. The first class of graduate students was matriculated the following fall. In 2019, the school had 28 faculty members, 91 undergraduate students, 134 graduate students, and 75 postdoctoral fellows.

The graduate program curriculum includes various science and engineering disciplines, product design, entrepreneurship, and communication. The program is interdisciplinary, featuring a connected art program called STAGE Lab. STAGE Lab creates plays and films in the context of scientific research at UChicago PME.

The undergraduate major was added in spring 2015. It was the first engineering major offered at the University of Chicago. In 2018, the first undergraduate class received degrees in molecular engineering. When the school was established in 2019, it announced plans to expand its undergraduate offerings.

David Awschalom, a professor at UChicago PME, said the school has contributed to Chicago becoming a hub for quantum education and research. PME offers an advanced degree in quantum science and engineering. It also partnered with Harvard University to launch the Quantum Information Science and Engineering Network, a graduate student training program in quantum science and engineering. Participating students are paired with two mentors—one from academia and one from industry. The program was funded by a $1.6 million award from the National Science Foundation.

The school's partnership with Argonne National Laboratory provides additional opportunities for research and innovation. Argonne's facilities include the Advanced Photon Source, the Argonne Leadership Computing Facility, and the Center for Nanoscale Materials. The lab also has experience licensing new technology for industrial and commercial applications.

UChicago PME's educational outreach initiatives include K-12 programs with events and internships throughout the year. In 2019, with the establishment of PME, the school also launched a partnership with City Colleges of Chicago. The multi-year program connects City College students interested in STEM fields with PME faculty and labs, with the goal of enabling these students to transfer into four-year STEM degree programs.

== Notable faculty ==
- David Awschalom, Liew Family Professor in Molecular Engineering
- Andrew Cleland, John A. MacLean Sr. Professor for Molecular Engineering Innovation and Enterprise; Director, Pritzker Nanofabrication Facility
- Andrew Ferguson, Associate Professor
- Giulia Galli, Liew Family Professor in Molecular Engineering
- Supratik Guha, Professor
- Jeffrey Hubbell, Eugene Bell Professor in Tissue Engineering
- Nadya Mason, Dean of the Pritzker School of Molecular Engineering and the Robert J. Zimmer Professor of Molecular Engineering
- Y. Shirley Meng, Professor at the Pritzker School of Molecular Engineering and chief scientist of the Argonne Collaborative Center for Energy Storage Science (ACCESS) at Argonne National Laboratory.
- Paul Nealey, Brady W. Dougan Professor in Molecular Engineering
- Rama Ranganathan, Joseph Regenstein Professor in the Department of Biochemistry and Molecular Biology, Institute for Molecular Engineering, and the College
- Stuart Rowan, Barry L. MacLean Professor for Molecular Engineering Innovation and Enterprise
- Melody Swartz, William B. Ogden Professor
- Matthew Tirrell, Professor Emeritus, Founding Dean and Founding Pritzker Director of the Institute for Molecular Engineering
