= Ma Chung-pei =

Astrophysicist

Ma Chung-Pei
- 馬中珮
- Born: Taiwan
- Education: Massachusetts Institute of Technology (BS, PhD)
- Awards: Member of the National Academy of Sciences; Member of the American Academy of Arts and Sciences; Fellow of the American Association for the Advancement of Science; Fellow of the American Physical Society; Fellow of the American Astronomical Society; Sloan Research Fellowship; Simons Foundation fellow Annie Jump Cannon Award in Astronomy; Maria Goeppert-Mayer Award
- Scientific career
- Fields: Cosmology, astrophysics
- Workplaces: University of California, Berkeley

Ma Chung-Pei (Chinese: 馬中珮; pinyin: Mǎ Zhōngpèi) is a Taiwanese-American astrophysicist and cosmologist. She is the Judy Chandler Webb Professor of Astronomy and Physics at the University of California, Berkeley. She led the teams that discovered several of largest known black holes from 2011 to 2016.

== Biography ==
Ma was born in Taiwan to parents Huang Chao-heng and Ma Chi-shen. She started playing violin at the age of four. She attended Taipei Municipal First Girls' Senior High School and won the Taiwan National Violin Competition in 1983. She then attended the Massachusetts Institute of Technology (MIT), receiving her Bachelor of Science degree in physics in 1987. She then earned a Ph.D. in physics from MIT in 1993. She studied theoretical cosmology and particle physics with Alan Guth and Edmund W. Bertschinger, her doctoral advisors. A violin prodigy as a teenager in Taiwan, winning a national violin competition in Taipei when she was 16, she also took violin classes during her college years at MIT at Boston's New England Conservatory of Music.

From 1993 to 1996 Ma had a postdoctoral fellowship at the California Institute of Technology. From 1996 to 2001 she was an assistant and associate professor at the University of Pennsylvania. While there she won the Lindback Award for Distinguished Teaching. She became a professor of astronomy at UC Berkeley's Department of Astronomy in 2001.

Ma's research interests are the large-scale structure of the universe, dark matter, and the cosmic microwave background. She led the team that discovered the largest known black holes in 2011.

Ma was the scientific editor in cosmology for The Astrophysical Journal.

== Awards and honors ==
- 1987 – Phi Beta Kappa Society
- 1997 – Annie Jump Cannon Award in Astronomy (American Astronomical Society)
- 1999 – Sloan Research Fellowship
- 2003 – Maria Goeppert-Mayer Award (American Physical Society)
- 2009 – American Physical Society Fellow
- 2012 – American Association for the Advancement of Science Fellow
- 2012 – Simons Foundation Fellow
- 2020 – American Academy of Arts and Sciences Member
- 2022 - American Astronomical Society Fellow
- 2022 - National Academy of Sciences Member
- 2024 - Academician, Academia Sinica

== Selected publications ==
- Ma, Chung-Pei; Bertschinger, Edmund (December 1995). "Cosmological Perturbation Theory in the Synchronous and Conformal Newtonian Gauges". The Astrophysical Journal. 455: 7–25. arXiv:astro-ph/9506072. Bibcode:1995ApJ...455....7M. doi:10.1086/176550. S2CID 14570491.
- Ma, Chung-Pei; Fry, J. N. (10 November 2000). "Deriving the Nonlinear Cosmological Power Spectrum and Bispectrum from Analytic Dark Matter Halo Profiles and Mass Functions". The Astrophysical Journal. 543 (2): 503–513. arXiv:astro-ph/0003343. Bibcode:2000ApJ...543..503M. doi:10.1086/317146. S2CID 295034.
- Boylan-Kolchin, M.; Ma, C.-P.; Quataert, E. (1 January 2008). "Dynamical friction and galaxy merging time-scales". Monthly Notices of the Royal Astronomical Society. 383 (1): 93–101. arXiv:0707.2960. Bibcode:2008MNRAS.383...93B. doi:10.1111/j.1365-2966.2007.12530.x. S2CID 12502384.
- McConnell, Nicholas J.; Ma, Chung-Pei (20 February 2013). "Revisiting the Scaling Relations of Black Hole Masses and Host Galaxy Properties". The Astrophysical Journal. 764 (2): 184. arXiv:1211.2816. Bibcode:2013ApJ...764..184M. doi:10.1088/0004-637X/764/2/184. S2CID 118411403.
- Ma, Chung-Pei; Caldwell, R. R.; Bode, Paul; Wang, Limin (10 August 1999). "The Mass Power Spectrum in Quintessence Cosmological Models". The Astrophysical Journal. 521 (1): L1–L4. arXiv:astro-ph/9906174. Bibcode:1999ApJ...521L...1M. doi:10.1086/312183. S2CID 16817444.
- Fakhouri, Onsi; Ma, Chung-Pei; Boylan-Kolchin, Michael (21 August 2010). "The merger rates and mass assembly histories of dark matter haloes in the two Millennium simulations". Monthly Notices of the Royal Astronomical Society. 406 (4): 2267–2278. arXiv:1001.2304. Bibcode:2010MNRAS.406.2267F. doi:10.1111/j.1365-2966.2010.16859.x. S2CID 118485197.

== See also ==
- Timeline of women in science
