= Barbara Cooper (physicist) =

American physicist

Barbara Hope Cooper
- Born: September 1, 1953; Lancaster, Pennsylvania
- Died: August 7, 1999 (aged 45); Cayuga Medical Center
- Education: Cornell University; California Institute of Technology
- Awards: Maria Goeppert-Mayer Award
- Scientific career
- Fields: Physics
- Workplaces: Cornell University
- Thesis: Erosion of Ice Films by Energetic Ions (1982)
- Doctoral advisor: Thomas Tombrello

Barbara Hope Cooper (September 1, 1953 – August 7, 1999) was an American physicist. She was the first female professor on the physics faculty at Cornell University.

== Early life and education ==
Cooper was born in Lancaster in 1953. She was raised in Newark. She attended Newark High School and graduated in 1971. Her father, Charles Burleigh Cooper, was an emeritus professor of physics at the University of Delaware. She completed her undergraduate degree in 1976 at Cornell University. When she started at Cornell, she intended to apply to medical school. When she injured her back in her second year, she took a break from her studies to recover and was hired to work on an undergraduate research project at the Cornell Laboratory of Nuclear Studies. She became more interested in physics. She went on to obtain a PhD from the California Institute of Technology in 1982. She was supervised by Thomas Tombrello. Her thesis was entitled Erosion of Ice Films by Energetic Ions.

== Career ==
Cooper stayed at Caltech until 1983 for a postdoctoral fellowship, then she was hired by Cornell University as an assistant professor. She was granted full professorship in 1995.

Cooper specialised in charge exchange in low-energy ion-surface scattering. This topic is relevant in fabrication processes based on surface chemistry, including plasma etching. She built up her lab from scratch, creating ion-beam systems operating from 10 eV to 1000 eV and other instruments in addition to propelling research into theoretical models. She expanded her expertise to include ion erosion and X-ray diffraction metal growth. She was a proponent for multidisciplinary research collaborations at Cornell. She was a leader in establishing the Cornell Center for Materials Research (CCMR) and the Cornell High-Energy Synchrotron Source (CHESS).

She was interested in science outreach and organised workshops for elementary school students. She encouraged exploration and the use of interactive examples to teach undergraduate physics. Cooper mentored women in physics and more than half of the graduate students in her research group were women at the time of her death.

== Awards and honours ==
- 1992 Maria Goeppert Mayer Award for her innovative studies of ion-surface interactions in the hyperthermal energy range. Combining experimental data from a highly versatile ion spectrometer with theoretical modeling, she has developed accurate ion-surface interaction potentials and provided detailed information about energy deposition and scattering mechanisms.
- Faculty development awards from IBM and AT&T.
- 1985 NSF Presidential Young Investigator.
- Bell Labs Graduate Research Program for Women award.
- Named Fellow of the American Physical Society in 1995.

== Personal life ==
Cooper was married to physicist Christopher Robert Myers. They had a daughter who was eight at the time of Cooper's death. Cooper died in 1999 six months after being diagnosed with lung cancer at Cayuga Medical Center.
