= Saskia Mioduszewski =

American nuclear physicist

- Education: North Carolina State University; University of Tennessee
- Awards: American Physical Society Fellow; Maria Goeppert Mayer Award; Presidential Early Career Awards for Scientists and Engineers
- Scientific career
- Fields: Experimental nuclear physics
- Workplaces: Brookhaven National Laboratory; Texas A&M University
- Thesis: Centrality dependence of antiproton production in Proton-Nucleus Collisions at 17.5 and 12.3 GeV (1999)
- Website: https://cyclotron.tamu.edu/mio/

Saskia Mioduszewski is a nuclear physicist and professor at Texas A&M University.

== Education ==
Mioduszewski completed an undergraduate degree in physics and mathematics in 1994 at North Carolina State University. In 2000, she obtained her PhD in physics from the University of Tennessee. Her PhD thesis was called Centrality dependence of antiproton production in Proton-Nucleus Collisions at 17.5 and 12.3 GeV.

== Career ==
Between 2000 and 2005, Mioduszewski was a postdoctoral research associate at Brookhaven National Laboratory. During this time, she contributed to the PHENIX Experiment at the Relativistic Heavy Ion Collider (RHIC).

In 2005, she became an assistant professor at Texas A&M University. She continues to work with the RHIC on the STAR Collaboration and is a member of the Cyclotron Institute. She is interested in studying ultra-relativistic heavy-ion collisions. In particular, she studies the transition between nuclear or "hadronic" matter and the state known as Quark Gluon Plasma.

An application of Mioduszewski's work is in replicating conditions similar to just after the Big Bang by colliding gold particles accelerated to nearly the speed of light. The result of the high-speed collisions is a new particle called an "anti-hypertriton". The particles then cool and decay over lifetimes shorter than nanosecond timescales. These experiments are carried out at RHIC and may help improve understanding of nuclear interactions as well as the distribution of matter and antimatter in the universe. Today, matter appears to be far more prevalent than antimatter, and this asymmetry remains an active research area.

== Awards and honours ==
- 2019 Fellow of the American Physical Society for sustained leadership of high-precision measurement of the quark-gluon plasma using direct photons and their correlations with hadrons and jets at the PHENIX and STAR experiments at the Relativistic Heavy Ion Collider.
- 2018 Presidential Impact Fellow of Texas A&M University.
- 2009 Maria Goeppert Mayer Award for her pioneering contributions to the observation of jet quenching and her continuing efforts to understand high- p_T phenomena in relativistic heavy-ion collisions.
- 2006 Alfred P. Sloan Fellowship.
- 2003 Presidential Early Career Awards for Scientists and Engineers.
- 1998 Paul H. Stelson Nuclear Physics Award.

== Personal life ==
Mioduszewski is married to Ralf Rapp, another physics professor at Texas A&M University. They have a son.
