= Louise Dolan =

American mathematical physicist

Louise A. Dolan
- Born: Wilmington, Delaware
- Education: Wellesley College; Massachusetts Institute of Technology
- Awards: Phi Beta Kappa (1969); Sigma Xi (1970); Fulbright (1971); Maria Goeppert-Mayer Award (1987); Fellow, American Physical Society (1987)
- Scientific career
- Fields: Theoretical particle physics, gauge theories, gravity, and string theory.
- Doctoral advisor: Francis E. Low

Louise Ann Dolan (born April 5, 1950) is an American mathematical physicist and professor of physics at the University of North Carolina at Chapel Hill. She does research in theoretical particle physics, gauge theories, gravity, and string theory, and is generally considered to be one of the foremost experts worldwide in this field. Her work is at the forefront of particle physics today.

== Biography ==
After graduating from Wellesley College as a physics major in 1971, she received a Fulbright scholarship and studied at the University of Heidelberg, Germany. She received her Ph.D. in theoretical physics from the Massachusetts Institute of Technology in 1976 and was a junior fellow in the Society of Fellows at Harvard University from 1976 to 1979. She then joined Rockefeller University in New York City as a research associate, and was promoted to assistant professor in 1980, and associate professor in 1982. In 1990, Dolan joined the faculty of the University of North Carolina, department of physics and astronomy, where she now holds the position of university distinguished professor.

== Contributions ==
Dolan is responsible for several important discoveries which have furthered the study of elementary particle physics. She co-authored "Symmetry Behavior at Finite Temperature", now regularly cited, in 1974. This paper became a part of the foundation of quantitative analysis of phase transitions in the early universe in cosmological theories and is widely recognized as a seminal work. In 1981 she pioneered the uses of affine algebras in particle physics and her coruscant contributions to string theory have included symmetries in the Type II superstring and integrable structures in super conformal non-abelian gauge theories. Her work has revolutionized string theory, and she is considered to be one of the originators of the field.

She is a Fellow of the American Physical Society and has authored over eighty scientific publications. Dolan is also the principal investigator on a Department of Energy grant, which funds the string theory program at Chapel Hill.

== Teaching ==
Professor Dolan regularly instructs graduate level classes related to quantum mechanics at UNC Chapel Hill. These include Quantum Mechanics I and II, Field Theory, Electromagnetism, and Group Theory.

== Awards ==
- 1971: Wellesley Alumnae Scholarship
- 1971: Woodrow Wilson Fellowship
- 1987: Fellow of the American Physical Society
- 1987: Maria Goeppert-Mayer Award of the American Physical Society
- 1988: Guggenheim Fellow
- 2004: Wellesley College Alumnae Achievement Award
