= Phiala E. Shanahan =

Australian theoretical physicist

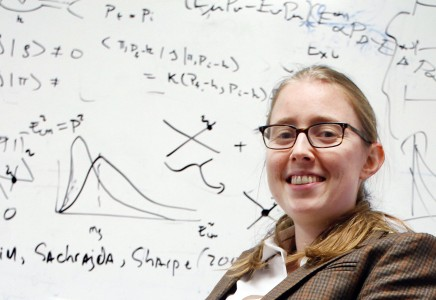
- Born: Phiala E. Shanahan; Australia
- Education: University of Adelaide
- Known for: Theoretical Physics, Lattice Quantum Chromodynamics
- Awards: Maria Goeppert-Mayer Award
- Scientific career
- Fields: Physics
- Workplaces: Massachusetts Institute of Technology; College of William & Mary; Thomas Jefferson National Accelerator Facility
- Doctoral advisor: Anthony William Thomas, Ross D. Young

Phiala Elisabeth Shanahan is an Australian theoretical physicist who lives and works in the United States. She is known for her work on the structure and interactions of hadrons and nuclei and her innovative use of machine learning techniques in lattice quantum field theory calculations.

== Education ==
Shanahan attended The Wilderness School in Medindie, a suburb of Adelaide, South Australia. While there, she received a 2007 Australian Student Prize. She received her BSc from the University of Adelaide in 2012 and her PhD from the same institution in 2015. Her PhD advisors were Anthony William Thomas and Ross D. Young. In her doctoral thesis, "Strangeness and Charge Symmetry Violation in Nucleon Structure," Shanahan studied the role of elementary particles called strange quarks and charge symmetry breaking in the structure of protons and neutrons in atomic nuclei using lattice quantum chromodynamics and effective field theory techniques. Her work improved understanding of the role of strange quarks in protons and atomic nuclei, which refines interpretations of experiments that seek to understand dark matter through direct detection techniques. Shanahan's work at the University of Adelaide and her thesis earned her the American Physical Society's 2017 Dissertation Award in Hadronic Physics, the 2016 Bragg Gold Medal for the best PhD completion in physics in Australia, and the University of Adelaide's 2016 Postgraduate Alumni University Medal.

== Career ==
After completing her PhD, Shanahan became a postdoctoral associate at the Massachusetts Institute of Technology from 2015 to 2017. During this time, she studied the role of force-carrying elementary particles called gluons in the structure of subatomic particles called hadrons. She also used lattice quantum chromodynamics techniques to examine the structures of atomic nuclei. In 2017, Forbes featured Shanahan in its "30 Under 30: Science" list for the impact of her work on the understanding of dark matter and physics beyond the Standard Model. From 2017 to 2018, she held a joint appointment as assistant professor at the College of William & Mary and senior staff scientist at the Thomas Jefferson National Accelerator Facility. Shanahan became assistant professor in the Center for Theoretical Physics at the Massachusetts Institute of Technology in July 2018, which at that time made her the youngest assistant professor of physics there. Shanahan was also a Simons Emmy Noether Fellow at the Perimeter Institute for Theoretical Physics during the fall 2018 semester. This fellowship supports early- and mid-career women physicists. Shanahan's current research includes seeking to understand how the structures and interactions of hadrons and atomic nuclei can be calculated from the fundamental principles of the Standard Model of physics, the role of gluons in the structures of hadrons and atomic nuclei, and how supercomputers and machine learning may be used to perform low-energy quantum chromodynamics calculations. Some of the predictions she is currently developing may be testable in the future using the Thomas Jefferson National Accelerator Facility's planned electron-ion collider.

Shanahan received the American Physical Society's 2021 Maria Goeppert Mayer Award, which recognizes outstanding achievement by early-career women physicists, for her "key insights into the structure and interactions of hadrons and nuclei using numerical and analytical methods and pioneering the use of machine learning techniques in lattice quantum field theory calculations in particle and nuclear physics."

== Honors and awards ==
- 2007 Australian Student Prize
- 2016 Bragg Gold Medal for the best PhD completion in physics in Australia
- University of Adelaide's 2016 Postgraduate Alumni University Medal
- American Physical Society's 2017 Dissertation Award in Hadronic Physics
- Featured in Forbes magazine's 2017 "30 Under 30: Science" list.
- 2018 National Science Foundation CAREER Award for the project "Quark and Gluon Structure of Nucleons and Nuclei"
- 2020 United States Department of Energy Early Career Award for the project "The QCD Structure of Nucleons and Light Nuclei."
- The Lattice International Conference's 2020 Kenneth G. Wilson Award for Excellence in Lattice Field Theory
- Featured in Science News's 2020 "10 Scientists to Watch" list
- American Physical Society's 2021 Maria Goeppert Mayer Award
