= Bonny L. Schumaker =

American physicist and pilot

- Education: California Institute of Technology
- Scientific career
- Workplaces: Jet Propulsion Laboratory
- Thesis: Theoretical Investigations in Nonlinear Quantum Optics, Theory of Measurement, and Pulsations of General Relativistic Models of Neutron Stars (1985)
- Doctoral advisor: Kip Thorne

Bonny Laura Schumaker (born 1953) is an American physicist and pilot who worked on the LISA Pathfinder. In 2010 she founded the nonprofit "On Wings of Care", a charity which protects animals and environments.

== Early life and education ==
Schumaker was born and raised in Wisconsin, near Lake Michigan. She wanted to be a vet but was awarded a scholarship to study physics at the California Institute of Technology. She loved mathematics, and continued at the California Institute of Technology for her graduate studies, earning a PhD in 1985. She worked under the supervision of Kip Thorne. Over six papers, her PhD thesis considered theoretical investigations into nonlinear quantum optics. She developed the mathematical theory of torsional oscillations in fully relativistic spherical stellar models and worked on homodyne detection. Her work considered two-photon physics using quadrature phase amplitudes, a technique now known as the Caves–Schumaker formalism, which has become a standard mathematical tool in optomechanics, quantum optics and gravitational wave science. She worked at Caltech as a postdoctoral research fellow for a year, before moving to the Jet Propulsion Laboratory in 1986. In 1988 she was awarded the Maria Goeppert-Mayer Award for her contributions to quantum optics. Schumaker trained as a pilot in 1996 and flew for Continental Airlines. She became a Federal Aviation Administration instructor in the mid nineties. She developed the Precision Optical INTerferometer in space (POINTS) that was proposed for the ASEPS-1 mission.

== Career ==
Schumaker conceptualised the LISA Pathfinder experiment at the Jet Propulsion Laboratory. She worked in the design and development team of the interferometer. By 2008 Schumaker had completed three mock data challenges, demonstrating the ability of the device to deal with the Galactic foreground and achieve accurate recovery of EMRI signals. The pathfinder contains six gold-platinum cube proof masses, and Schumaker predicted that "a nudge equivalent to the air pressure from a human whisper 40 kilometers away would tip a cube out of whack". She worked on a new technique to monitor changes in carbon found in soil; combining field-delineated spatial units, remote sensing, soil residues and simulations models. Schumaker retired from the Jet Propulsion Laboratory in 2011.

=== Wings of Care ===
Schumaker founded the nonprofit "On Wings of Care" in 2010, which looks to promote the welfare of animals. Schumaker uses her skills as a pilot to assess animal habitats, helping with rescues and rehabilitation. She joined the Board of Directors of the Sea Shepherd Conservation Society. Since the Deepwater Horizon oil spill in 2010, Schumaker has flown over the Gulf of Mexico for over 600 hours, locating and protecting animals. She flies a Cessna called "Bessie". She is often the first responder for pollution incidents. In August 2011 she identified oil globules on the surface of the ocean which had erupted from the broken well of Deepwater Horizon. She published the book The Story of Pellie Lou: A Pelican Who Survived the Gulf of Mexico Oil Spill in 2015. She has returned to the oil spill with various news organisations, and supported the local community in seeking justice. In 2018 she flew over the coastline of Louisiana to evaluate the fallout from Hurricane Katrina. She has since studied hydrocarbon seepage in the Mississippi Canyon.
