= Richard Zare =

American chemist

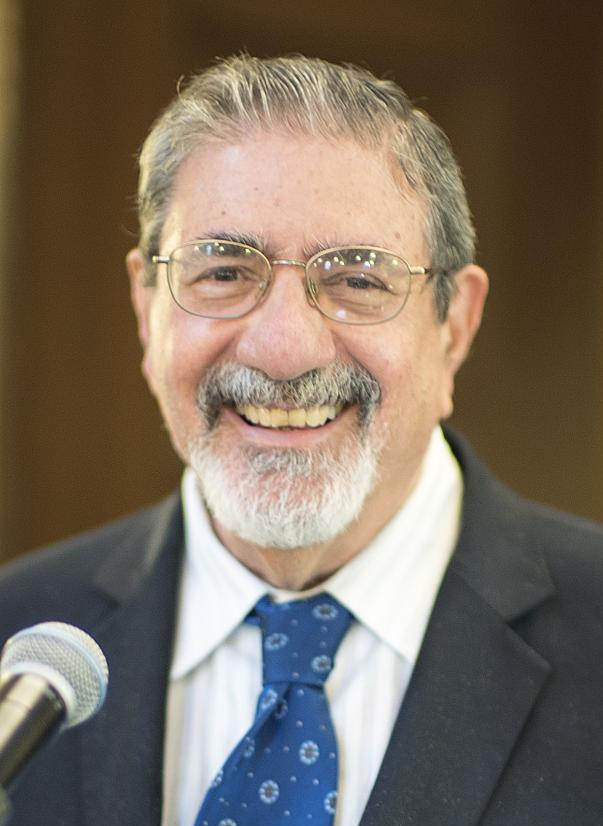
- Zare in 2015
- Born: Richard Neil Zare; November 19, 1939 (age 86); Cleveland, Ohio, United States
- Education: Harvard University B.A (1961) Ph.D. (1964)
- Spouse: Susan Shively Zare
- Scientific career
- Fields: Chemist
- Workplaces: Columbia University; Stanford University
- Thesis: Molecular fluorescence and photodissociation (1964)
- Doctoral advisor: Dudley Herschbach
- Doctoral students: Hongkun Park; William R. Simpson; Renato Zenobi; Stacey Bent
- Other notable students: Gerald Diebold (postdoc) Andrew Orr-Ewing (postdoc); Shuming Nie (postdoc); Ludger Wöste (postdoc)
- Website: web.stanford.edu/group/Zarelab/about.html

Richard Neil Zare (born November 19, 1939, in Cleveland, Ohio) is the Marguerite Blake Wilbur Professor in Natural Science and a Professor of Chemistry at Stanford University. Throughout his career, Zare has made a considerable impact in physical chemistry and analytical chemistry, particularly through the development of laser-induced fluorescence (LIF) and the study of chemical reactions at the molecular and nanoscale level. LIF is an extremely sensitive technique with applications ranging from analytical chemistry and molecular biology to astrophysics. One of its applications was the sequencing of the human genome.

Zare is known for his enthusiasm for science and his exploration of new areas of research. He has mentored over 150 PhD students and postdoctoral researchers, of whom more than 49 are women or members of minorities. Zare is a strong advocate for women in science, and a fellow of the Association for Women in Science (AWIS) as of 2008.

== Education ==
Zare earned his BA in chemistry and physics in 1961 and his PhD in 1964 in physical and analytical chemistry at Harvard University. As an undergraduate he worked with William Klemperer. Zare moved to the University of California, Berkeley to do PhD work with Dudley Herschbach, then returned 2 years later when Herschbach accepted a position at Harvard. Zare completed his PhD thesis, a theoretical analysis of Molecular fluorescence and photodissociation, with Herschbach at Harvard in 1964.

== Career ==
Zare joined Massachusetts Institute of Technology as an assistant professor in 1965. From 1966 to 1969, he was jointly appointed in the departments of chemistry, physics and astrophysics at JILA at the University of Colorado Boulder. In 1969 he became a full professor in the department of chemistry at Columbia University. He was named the Higgins Professor of Natural Science at Columbia in 1975.

In 1977 Zare accepted a position as a full professor of chemistry at Stanford University, becoming the Marguerite Blake Wilbur Professor in Natural Science in 1987. He served as chair of the chemistry department from 2005 to 2011.

Zare served on the National Science Board (NSB) of the National Science Foundation (NSF) from 1990 to 1996, and was the board's chair from 1994 to 1996. He was a founding co-editor of the Annual Review of Analytical Chemistry from 2008–2012. He is a member of the editorial advisory boards of other scientific publications, among them Chemistry World, Angewandte Chemie, Central European Journal of Chemistry, Journal of Separation Sciences and the Chinese Journal of Chromatography. Zare served on the Physical Sciences jury for the Infosys Prize from 2014 to 2016. He is chairman of the board of directors at Annual Reviews, Inc., and serves on the board of directors of The Camille and Henry Dreyfus Foundation.

== Research ==
Zare discusses his contributions to chemistry and molecular spectroscopy.

Zare is well known for his research in laser chemistry, particularly the development of laser-induced fluorescence, which he has used to study reaction dynamics and analytical detection methods. His research on the spectroscopy of chemical compounds suggested a new mechanism for energy transference in inelastic collisions. He and his students have developed tools and techniques to examine chemical reactions at the molecular and nanoscale levels. They have explored a wide-ranging variety of problems in physical chemistry and chemical analysis including examination of heterogeneous structures in mineral samples, the contents of cells and subcellular compartments, and the chemical analysis of liquid samples.

Early in his career, the question of whether laser-induced fluorescence (LIF) could be used to study aflatoxins spurred Zare to adapt LIF for use on liquids. Work with postdoc Gerald Diebold resulted in the first use of LIF for detection in chemical analysis. This opened up the potential for a wide variety of fluid applications, including the detection of single molecules in liquids at room-temperature and detection methods for capillary electrophoresis. Zare and his coworkers have combined CCD imaging with LIF detection to detect amol and zeptamole amounts of FITC-labelled amino acids. Zare and his students have also developed cavity ring-down spectroscopy (CRDS) for quantitative diagnosis, and for high performance liquid chromatography (HPLC) Zare is also involved in the development of desorption electrospray ionization (DESI) techniques, which are being used for mass spectrometric imaging of lipids, metabolites and proteins in tissue samples, including prostate cancer.

"I'm right now very excited about mass spectrometry, still excited about lasers, all types of [analytical techniques], but to me, they're tools. They're not ends in themselves... With new tools and measurement techniques, you can make advances in all types of fundamental problems." Richard Zare

Zare has also worked with NASA and others on astrobiology. He is one of the co-authors of a paper that appeared in Science in 1996, raising the possibility that a meteorite from Mars, ALH84001, contained traces of Martian life. Zare used two-step laser mass spectrometry (L2MS), a technique that is particularly sensitive to organic molecules, to examine samples from the interior of the meteorite. He found that the 4.5-billion-year-old Martian meteorite, discovered in Antarctica, contained polycyclic aromatic hydrocarbons. This lead researchers to speculate on the presence of fossilized remains from Mars. Other researchers questioned this interpretation, suggesting that the sample might have been contaminated after its arrival on Earth. Considerable controversy resulted, which Zare felt disrupted his ongoing laboratory research. Zare has also worked with NASA on examinations of organic materials obtained from Comet 81P/Wild by the Stardust Spacecraft.

== Publications ==
Zare has published several books, including a widely used textbook on the topic of angular momentum in quantum systems that is considered a classic for its explanations of angular momentum algebra and the fundamentals of molecular spectroscopy. He is an author or co-author of more than 1,000 peer-reviewed papers.

=== Selected publications ===
- Zare, RN; Fernández, FM; Kimmel, JR (January 3, 2003). "Hadamard transform time-of-flight mass spectrometry: more signal, more of the time". Angewandte Chemie International Edition in English. 42 (1): 30–5. doi:10.1002/anie.200390047. PMID 19757587. S2CID 2259113.
- Wu, H.; Wheeler, A.; Zare, R. N. (August 24, 2004). "Chemical cytometry on a picoliter-scale integrated microfluidic chip" (PDF). Proceedings of the National Academy of Sciences. 101 (35): 12809–12813. Bibcode:2004PNAS..10112809W. doi:10.1073/pnas.0405299101. PMC 516477. PMID 15328405.
- Zare, R. N. (March 20, 1998). "Laser Control of Chemical Reactions" (PDF). Science. 279 (5358): 1875–1879. Bibcode:1998Sci...279.1875Z. doi:10.1126/science.279.5358.1875. PMID 9506928.
- Alexander, A. J.; Zare, R. N. (1998). "Anatomy of Elementary Chemical Reactions" (PDF). Journal of Chemical Education. 75 (9): 1105–1118. Bibcode:1998JChEd..75.1105A. doi:10.1021/ed075p1105.
- Althorpe, Stuart C.; Fernández-Alonso, Félix; Bean, Brian D.; Ayers, James D.; Pomerantz, Andrew E.; Zare, Richard N.; Wrede, Eckart (March 7, 2002). "Observation and interpretation of a time-delayed mechanism in the hydrogen exchange reaction". Nature. 416 (6876): 67–70. Bibcode:2002Natur.416...67A. doi:10.1038/416067a. PMID 11882892. S2CID 4414725.

=== Books ===
- Hsu, Donald K.; Monts, David L.; Zare, Richard N. (1978). Spectral atlas of nitrogen dioxide, 5530 to 6480 Å. New York: Academic Press. ISBN 978-0-12-357950-8.
- Zare, Richard N. (1988). Angular momentum : understanding spatial aspects in chemistry and physics. New York: Wiley. ISBN 978-0-471-85892-8.
- Zare, Richard N.; Spencer, Bertrand H.; Springer, Dwight S.; Jacobson, Matthew P. (1995). Laser experiments for beginners. Sausalito, Calif.: University Science Books. ISBN 978-0-935702-36-1.
- Zare, Richard N. (1998). Angular momentum : understanding spatial aspects in chemistry and physics. New York: Wiley. ISBN 978-0-471-24478-3.
- Kleiman, Valeria; Park, Hongkun; Gordon, Robert J.; Zare, Richard N. (1998). Companion to Angular momentum. New York: Wiley. ISBN 978-0-471-19249-7.
- Yeung, Edward S.; Zare, Richard N. (2008). Annual Review of Analytical Chemistry, Volume 1. Annual Reviews Inc., U.S. ISBN 978-0-8243-4401-6.

== Awards, honors and fellowships ==
- 1974 – National Fresenius Award, Phi Lambda Upsilon
- 1976 – Member, National Academy of Sciences
- 1976 – Member, American Academy of Arts and Sciences
- 1979 – inaugural recipient of the Michael Polanyi Medal, Royal Society of Chemistry
- 1981 – Earle K. Plyler Prize
- 1983 – Spectroscopy Society of Pittsburgh Award
- 1983 – National Medal of Science
- 1985 – Irving Langmuir Award in Chemical Physics
- 1986 – Michelson-Morley Award
- 1986 – John Gamble Kirkwood Award, ACS New Haven Section, "in recognition of his fundamental contributions in experimental and theoretical aspects of reaction dynamics."
- 1990 – Willard Gibbs Medal
- 1991 – Peter Debye Award
- 1991 – National Academy of Sciences Award in Chemical Sciences, "For his pioneering laser-based techniques, deep insights, and seminal contributions, which have influenced every facet of chemical reaction dynamics."
- 1991 – Member, American Philosophical Society
- 1993 – Dannie Heineman Prize
- 1993 – The Harvey Prize
- 1995 – ACS Division of Analytical Chemistry Award in Chemical Instrumentation
- 1996 – The Bing Fellowship teaching award
- 1997 – California Scientist of the Year Award
- 1998 – American Chemical Society Award in Analytical Chemistry
- 1999 – E. Bright Wilson Award in Spectroscopy
- 1999 – Welch Award in Chemistry
- 1999 – Foreign Member of the Royal Society of London
- 2000 – honorary doctorate, Faculty of Science and Technology, Uppsala University, Sweden
- 2000 – Arthur L. Schawlow Prize in Laser Science
- 2000 – Nobel Laureate Signature Award for Graduate Education
- 2001 – Charles Lathrop Parsons Award
- 2001 – Faraday Lectureship Prize, Royal Society of Chemistry
- 2003 – Laurance and Naomi Carpenter Hoagland Prize
- 2004 – Foreign member, Royal Swedish Academy of Sciences
- 2004 – Foreign member, Chinese Academy of Sciences (CAS), Beijing, P.R.C.
- 2004 – James Flack Norris Award for Outstanding Achievement in the Teaching of Chemistry, Northeastern Section of the American Chemical Society
- 2005 – Nichols Medal, ACS (New York Section)
- 2005 – Wolf Prize in Chemistry
- 2005 – Howard Hughes Medical Institute Professorship
- 2009 – F.A. Cotton Medal for Excellence in Chemical Research of the American Chemical Society
- 2009 – BBVA Foundation Frontiers of Knowledge Award in Basic Science (co-winner with Michael Fisher)
- 2010 – Priestley Medal
- 2011 – King Faisal International Prize
- 2012 – Recipient of the Reed M. Izatt and James J. Christensen Lectureship.
- 2017 – Othmer Gold Medal from the Chemical Heritage Foundation
