= Elisabeth Krause =

German-American astronomer

- Born: Anna Elisabeth Krause
- Education: University of Bonn; Caltech
- Awards: Sloan Research Fellowship; Maria Goeppert Mayer Award; Fellow of the David and Lucile Packard Foundation
- Scientific career
- Fields: Cosmology
- Workplaces: University of Pennsylvania; Stanford-KIPAC; Caltech-JPL; University of Arizona
- Thesis: Topics in Large-Scale Structure (2012)
- Doctoral advisor: Chris Hirata
- Website: http://azcosmolab.org/index.html

Anna Elisabeth Krause is a German astronomer and full professor of physics at the University of Arizona.

== Education ==
Krause received a physics Diplom from the University of Bonn in 2007. She worked with Peter Schneider from Bonn and Lars Hernquist from Harvard on a project entitled Mock Observations of Simulated Galaxy interactions.

She completed a PhD at Caltech in 2012 under Chris Hirata. Her thesis was called Topics in Large-Scale Structure.

== Career ==
Krause spent roughly two years each at the University of Pennsylvania, Stanford-KIPAC and Caltech-JPL as a postdoctoral fellow. In 2018, she was appointed assistant professor in physics and astronomy at the University of Arizona. She was interested in working at the University of Arizona to be part of the Vera C. Rubin Observatory collaboration.

Krause is a cosmologist. She works on international collaborations including the Vera C. Rubin Observatory and SPHEREx, of which she is a co-investigator. She is a scientific coordinator for the Dark Energy Survey. Krause is interested in isolating the cause of cosmic acceleration by developing an analysis framework to combine datasets at different wavelengths obtained through multiple surveys. She is known for developing bias-free algorithms to connect the latest data with theory. This is particularly important when combining datasets: while the additional information can increase accuracy, the analysis must account for the relationship between the different galactic distributions. Using a blind approach can also reduce the likelihood that the analysis will be influenced by previous findings. Her goal is to shed light on the nature of dark energy. Based on large-scale galaxy structure information, Krause tunes models to determine the initial composition of the Universe.

== Awards and honours ==
- 2021 Sloan Research Fellowship.
- 2020 Maria Goeppert Mayer Award for contributions to theoretical cosmology and astrophysics, in particular, pioneering approaches to modeling key observables and extracting cosmological constraints from large galaxy surveys.
- 2020 Fellow of the David and Lucile Packard Foundation.
- 2019 Department of Energy Early Career Research Award for the project "Joint Analyses of Lensing, Clustering, and Galaxy Clusters with DES and LSST".
- 2018 International Union of Pure and Applied Physics Young Scientist Prize for pioneering contributions to the extraction of cosmological insights from large galaxy surveys, including modeling key observables, covariance matrix estimation, and the development of cosmological analysis tools, which have ushered in a new era of multi-probe cosmology and set a new standard for forthcoming experiments.
