= Nadya Mason =

American academic physicist and nanotechnologist

- Education: Harvard University (BS), Stanford (PhD)
- Scientific career
- Fields: Superconductivity Quantum Computing Nanomaterials
- Workplaces: Harvard University; University of Illinois at Urbana-Champaign; The University of Chicago
- Thesis: Superconductor-metal-insulator transitions in two dimensions (2001)

Nadya Mason is dean of the Pritzker School of Molecular Engineering at The University of Chicago, receiving that appointment in October 2023. Prior to joining The University of Chicago, she was the Rosalyn Sussman Yalow Professor of Physics at the University of Illinois at Urbana-Champaign. As a condensed matter experimentalist, she works on the quantum limits of low-dimensional systems. Mason was the Director of the Illinois Materials Research Science and Engineering Center (I-MRSEC), and Director of the Beckman Institute for Advanced Science and Technology from September 2022 through September 2023. She was the first woman and woman of color to work as the director at the institute. In 2021, she was elected to the National Academy of Sciences.

== Early life and education ==
As she described herself in interview, Mason was born in New York City, and lived in Brooklyn for the first six years of her life; after that, she grew up in Washington, D.C. before moving to Houston. As described to Aubrie Williams in interview, Mason spent from ages 7–16 ("most of my childhood") involved in gymnastics at a highly competitive level, making the Junior National Team at age 13, and ranking 27th nationally at age 15. This period of intensive training included a year (1986) spent with Bela Karolyi, a demanding course she ultimately set aside to pursue science.

Mason completed a bachelor's degree at Harvard University in 1995, and a PhD under Aharon Kapitulnik at Stanford University in 2001. Mason always enjoyed math and science, and completed several science-focused internships during her education, including a fellowship in condensed matter at Bell Laboratories.

== Career ==
Mason returned to Harvard as a MRSEC Postdoctoral Fellow in 2001, where she was elected junior fellow in the Harvard Society of Fellows. In 2005, Mason joined the University of Illinois at Urbana–Champaign as an assistant professor. In 2014 she was appointed a John Bardeen Faculty Scholar in Physics at University of Illinois at Urbana–Champaign. In 2016 she was promoted to full Professor. As of 2018, Mason was a General Councillor for the American Physical Society.

On October 1, 2023, Mason was appointed Dean of the University of Chicago's Pritzker School of Molecular Engineering, succeeding Matthew J. Tirrell.

=== Research ===
In 2006, Mason was on a team that was first to demonstrate the non-equilibrium Kondo effect, and in 2011 she was on a team that observed individual superconducting bound states in graphene-based systems. In the 2014-2018 period, Mason's research focused on carbon nanotubes, graphene, nanostructured semiconductors and topological insulators. In these systems she has concentrated on electron interactions, and how to apply her understanding to quantum computing.

== Service and outreach ==
As of 2017, Mason was Chair of the APS Committee on Minorities, and was featured by the National Society of Black Physicists for Black History Month in 2017. Also in 2017, she discussed the limit on the size of electronics and impact of novel nanomaterials on the "Saturday Physics for Everyone 2017" program of the UIUC YouTube channel.

In November 2019, Mason gave a TED talk called, "How to spark your creativity, scientifically."

In 2026, Mason was chosen to be a member of the Department of Energy's Office of Science Advisory Committee.

== Honors and awards ==
- 2021 - Elected to the American Academy of Arts and Sciences, and to the US National Academy of Sciences
- 2020 - Edward A. Bouchet Award, American Physical Society
- 2018 - Fellow, American Physical Society
- 2013 - Dean's Award for Excellence in Research, University of Illinois at Urbana–Champaign
- 2012 - Maria Goeppert Mayer Award, American Physical Society
- 2009 - Denice Denton Emerging Leader Award Anita Borg Institute Women of Vision Awards
- 2008 - Diverse Magazine "Emerging Scholar"
- 2007 - National Science Foundation CAREER award

Mason is also described as having been named a Woodrow Wilson Career Enhancement Fellow, the dates of which is unclear from the sources.

== Personal life ==
As of a September 2011 interview, Mason was indicated as being married (husband, Dillon), and having two daughters.
