= Stephanie Law (materials scientist) =

American materials scientist

Stephanie Law is an American materials scientist. Her research involves the use of molecular beam epitaxy to fabricate metamaterials including two-dimensional quantum materials, nanostructures, semiconductors, topological insulators, and plasmonic devices. She is an associate professor in the Department of Materials Science and Engineering and Wilson Faculty Fellow at Pennsylvania State University.

== Education and career ==
Law is originally from Marion, Iowa, where her father was a school band director and her mother was a schoolteacher and librarian. In high school, she took courses in astronomy and calculus at a local college. She majored in physics at Iowa State University, choosing physics as a reaction to her frustration with the imprecision of astronomical measurements. There, she worked with Paul C. Canfield on crystal growth, and on graduating in 2006, she followed Canfield's suggestion to continue in condensed matter physics.

After completing a Ph.D. in physics at the University of Illinois Urbana-Champaign in 2012, she continued there as a postdoctoral researcher in electrical and computer engineering, working there with Daniel Wasserman on optical materials. In 2014 she became Clare Boothe Luce Assistant Professor of Materials Science and Engineering at the University of Delaware, and in 2023 she moved to Pennsylvania State University.

== Recognition ==
Law was the 2016 recipient of the North American Molecular Beam Epitaxy Young Investigator Award, its first female recipient. She also received the 2019 Presidential Early Career Award for Scientists and Engineers, the 2019 Peter Mark Memorial Award of the American Vacuum Society (AVS), and the 2020 International Conference on Molecular Beam Epitaxy Young Investigator Award. She was named a Fellow of the AVS in 2024.
