= Robertson Scholars Program =

Coordinates: 36.00187°N 78.92239°W

The Robertson Scholars Leadership Program is a joint merit scholarship and leadership development program at Duke University and the University of North Carolina at Chapel Hill. The scholarship offers participants a unique "dual citizenship" at both Duke University and UNC-Chapel Hill. Approximately 25-30 students are selected from the pool of applicants to both universities.

== History and background ==
The program was created in 2000 by benefactor Julian Robertson, a 1955 graduate of UNC-Chapel Hill. Mr. Robertson sought to encourage collaboration between Duke and the University of North Carolina and to promote the development of young leaders. His initial $24 million gift as well as his subsequent gifts to the program and the universities are overseen by a board of directors including Duke University president Vincent E. Price, UNC-Chapel Hill chancellor Kevin Guskiewicz. Julian Robertson was chair of this board and was involved in the program's administration until his death in August 2022.

The program covers four years of undergraduate tuition, mandatory fees, room and board, and provides recipients full funding for three summer experiences. The summer components of the program have served as a model for DukeEngage, an initiative to offer the opportunity for summer research and internships to all Duke undergraduates.

Robertson Scholars are required to spend the second semester of their sophomore year at the sister campus and may attend classes at the sister campus throughout their undergraduate career.

== See also ==
- Jefferson Scholarship
- Morehead-Cain Scholarship
