= Gerald Diebold =

American physicist

Gerald J. Diebold is an American physicist and Professor Emeritus at Brown University. He is known for his contributions to photothermal and photoacoustic science. His research advanced understanding of the photoacoustic effect, from its fundamental mechanisms to its applications in imaging, spectroscopy, and sensing. Diebold’s work has also contributed to the development of techniques in analytical chemistry, voltage imaging based on vibrational potential, and X-ray phase-contrast imaging.

== Research and career ==
Diebold earned his Ph.D. in physics from Boston College in 1974 and completed postdoctoral work with Richard N. Zare at Columbia University and Stanford University. He joined the faculty at Brown University in 1978, where he became a full professor and is now Professor Emeritus.

Diebold was a co-founder of the International Photoacoustic and Photothermal Association and served as its director from 2002 to 2020. He received the James Smith Prize from the International Photoacoustic and Photothermal Society in 2011. He was elected a Fellow of the American Physical Society in 2010,

“for the development of a body of elegant and sophisticated theories addressing fundamental mechanisms of the laser photacoustic effect from spheres, cylinders, and layers of fluids and solids; the discovery of an anomalous giant photoacoustic effect; the worldwide impact of his experimental applications of his theories to suspensions, colloids, dye solutions, sedimentation and biomedical imaging.”

The Gerald J. Diebold Prize in Theoretical Photoacoustics and Photothermics was established in his honor.
