= Maria Goeppert-Mayer Award =

Award in physics

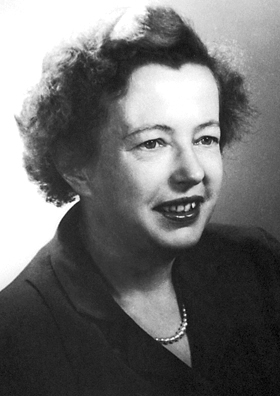
Maria Goeppert-Mayer

The Maria Goeppert-Mayer Award is an annual prize presented by the American Physical Society in recognition of an outstanding contribution to physics research by a woman. It recognizes and enhances outstanding achievements by women physicists in the early years of their careers.

The prize has been awarded since 1986 and is named after Maria Goeppert-Mayer, Nobel laureate in 1963 with J. Hans D. Jensen and Eugene Paul Wigner. Goeppert-Mayer and Jensen were awarded their prize "for their discovery of the nuclear shell structure". Goeppert-Mayer was the second woman to receive a Nobel Prize in Physics after Marie Curie.

== Recipients ==
- 1986: Judith S. Young
- 1987: Louise Dolan
- 1988: Bonny L. Schumaker
- 1989: Cherry A. Murray
- 1990: Ellen Williams
- 1991: Alice E. White
- 1992: Barbara Hope Cooper
- 1993: Ewine van Dishoeck
- 1994: Laura H. Greene
- 1995: Jacqueline Hewitt
- 1996: Marjorie Ann Olmstead
- 1997: Margaret Murnane
- 1998: Elizabeth Beise
- 1999: Andrea Ghez
- 2000: Sharon Glotzer
- 2001: Janet Conrad
- 2002: Deborah S. Jin
- 2003: Chung-Pei Michele Ma
- 2004: Suzanne Staggs
- 2005: Yuri Suzuki
- 2006: Hui Cao
- 2007: Amy Barger
- 2008: Vassiliki Kalogera
- 2009: Saskia Mioduszewski
- 2010: Alessandra Lanzara
- 2011: Réka Albert
- 2012: Nadya Mason
- 2013: Feryal Ozel
- 2014: Ana Maria Rey
- 2015: Gretchen Campbell
- 2016: Henriette Elvang
- 2017: Maiken Mikkelsen
- 2018: M. Lisa Manning
- 2019: Alyson Brooks
- 2020: Elisabeth Krause
- 2021: Phiala E. Shanahan
- 2022: Blakesley Burkhart
- 2023: Prineha Narang
- 2024: Alison Patteson
- 2025: Wennie Wang
- 2026: Kayla Nguyen

== See also ==
- List of physics awards
