= Janet Conrad =

American experimental physicist

Janet Marie Conrad
- Born: October 23, 1963 (age 62); Wooster, Ohio
- Education: Swarthmore College (B.A. 1985); Oxford University (M.Sc., 1987); Harvard University (Ph.D., 1993)
- Awards: Guggenheim Fellow; Sloan Research Fellow; Maria Goeppert-Mayer Award
- Scientific career
- Fields: Experimental Particle Physics
- Institutions: Massachusetts Institute of Technology; Columbia University; Fermilab

Janet Marie Conrad (born 1963) is an American experimental physicist, researcher, and professor at MIT studying elementary particle physics. Her work focuses on neutrino properties and the techniques for studying them. In recognition of her efforts, Conrad has been the recipient of several highly prestigious awards during her career, including an Alfred P. Sloan Research Fellow, a Guggenheim Fellow, and the American Physical Society Maria Goeppert-Mayer Award.

== Education ==
Conrad obtained a physics B.A. from Swarthmore College in 1985. She then went to Oxford University to complete a M.Sc. in High Energy Physics as a member of the European Muon Collaboration in 1987 then to Harvard University to complete a PhD in High Energy Physics in 1993.

== Career ==
Following Conrad's sophomore year at Swarthmore, she spent her summer in Cambridge, Massachusetts working with Francis Pipkin at Harvard, at her uncle's suggestion. The following summer, Conrad worked with him at Fermilab.

After graduating from Harvard in 1993, Conrad took a position as a postdoctoral research associate at the Nevis Laboratories, operated by Columbia University. In 1995, she joined Columbia's physics department as an assistant professor. In 1996 she was awarded the DOE Outstanding Junior Investigator Award for a study entitled Construction of a Decay Channel for the NuTeV Experiment at Fermilab . She gained tenure at Columbia in 1999. In 2002, she was nominated by the American Physical Society's Division of Particles and Fields for fellowship with the APS, citing "her leadership in experimental neutrino physics, particularly for initiating and leading the NuTeV decay channel experiment and the Mini-BooNe neutrino oscillations experiment". From 2005 until 2008, Conrad was a Columbia Distinguished Faculty Fellow, and was promoted to the endowed position of Walter O. Lecroy Professor in 2006. In 2008, Conrad left Columbia to join MIT's physics department as a professor.

Conrad is a member of several physics collaborations, including MicroBooNE, DAEδALUS, Short-Baseline Near Detector (SBND), and IceCube. She was previously a member of Double Chooz (2006-2014), SciBooNE (2005-2011), MiniBooNE (1997-2014), CCFR/NuTeV (1993-2001), E665 (1984-1996), and EMC (1985-1986).

In addition, she has acted as a spokesperson for IsoDAR/DAEdALUS and MiniBooNE, of which she was a founding member.

== Other ==
In 2012, Conrad took part in a panel with the World Science Festival, speaking to the public about neutrinos.

Inspired by detector development efforts while working on IceCube, Conrad took part in the development of a low-cost tabletop muon detector.

In 2015, Conrad and fellow MIT professor Lindley Winslow were consulted as experts in the culture and science of physics for the 2016 film Ghostbusters.

== Personal life ==
Janet Conrad was born October 23, 1963, in Wooster, Ohio. She was a member of 4-H as a child in Ohio.

Conrad is the niece of chemistry Nobel Laureate William Lipscomb.

Conrad is married to fellow physicist Vassili Papavassiliou, a professor at New Mexico State University

== Honors and awards ==
- Keasby Foundation Fellowship, 1986-1987 (awarded 1985)
- Harvard Physics Department (K.T. Bainbridge) Award (1988)
- AAUW American Dissertation Fellowship, 1991-92
- NSF Career Advancement Award, 1996
- DOE Outstanding Junior Investigator, 1996
- NSF CAREER Award, 1998
- Presidential Early Career Award for Scientists and Engineers, 1999
- Alfred P. Sloan Research Fellow, 2000
- The Maria Goeppert-Mayer Award from the American Physical Society, 2001
- The New York City Mayor’s Award for Excellence in Science and Technology, Young Investigator, 2001
- Fellow of the American Physical Society, 2003
- Guggenheim Fellow, 2009
- Amar G. Bose Fellowship, 2014
