= Elizabeth Beise =

American professor of physics

- Education: Massachusetts Institute of Technology; Carleton College
- Awards: Maria Goeppert-Mayer Award (1998)
- Scientific career
- Workplaces: University of Maryland, College Park

Elizabeth J. (Betsy) Beise is a Professor of Physics and Associate Provost at the University of Maryland, College Park. She works on quantum chromodynamics, nucleon structure and fundamental symmetries.

== Early life and education ==
Beise studied physics at Carleton College, and graduated in 1981. She joined MIT for her graduate research, earning a PhD in 1988. She was awarded the Peter T. Demos Award for the best PhD thesis from the MIT-Bates Accelerator Center. She worked at the California Institute of Technology Kellogg Radiation laboratory as a senior research fellow from 1988 to 1993. Since this fellowship, Beise has been involved with the study of baryons.

== Career ==
In 1993 Beise joined the University of Maryland, College Park. Her research considered the use of electron scattering to understand the structure of a nucleon. She worked in several research labs, including the Thomas Jefferson National Accelerator Facility, National Institute of Standards and Technology, Argonne National Laboratory and Fermilab. She worked on parity violating electron scattering and used data from the Jefferson Lab G0 experiment. She was awarded the American Physical Society Maria Goeppert-Mayer Award for her contributions to electron scattering in 1998. She contributed to a teacher's guide to nuclear science for the Lawrence Berkeley National Laboratory in 1998.

=== Academic service and advocacy ===
Beise is the Associate Provost for Academic Planning & Programs at the University of Maryland, College Park. In 1999 she joined the United States Department of Energy – NSF Nuclear Science Advisory Committee, writing the long-range plans in 1996, 2002, 2007 and 2012. In 2004 she served as the National Science Foundation Program Director for Nuclear Physics. She was a member of the American Physical Society Executive Board in 2009. Beise is interested in the intersection of the arts and sciences, and took part in an interdisciplinary AAAS symposium in 2008. She has checked the physics in film Ghostbusters, realising that they were estimating the rate of proton decay. In 2010 she contributed to the National Academy of Sciences Review of Nuclear Physics.

Beise has been involved with several initiatives to improve the representation of women, and particularly women of colour, in physics. Beise was part of a team that was awarded a National Science Foundation ADVANCE grant to investigate faculty workload, looking to transform the workplace culture that results in an underrepresentation of women in physics. The project is a five-year experiment in collaboration with North Carolina State University and the University of Massachusetts Amherst. She has been involved in the APS committee on the status of women in physics.

=== Awards and honours ===
- 2012 University of Maryland, College Park Distinguished Scholar-Teacher
- 2009 American Association for the Advancement of Science Fellow
- 2008 University of Maryland George M. Snow Award for Promotion of Women in Physics
- 2004 University of Maryland Faculty-mentor Phillip Merrill Scholarship Award
- 2001 American Physical Society Fellow
- 1998 American Physical Society Centennial Speaker
- 1998 American Physical Society Maria Goeppert-Mayer Award
