= Jefferson Scholarship =

Scholarship program at the University of Virginia

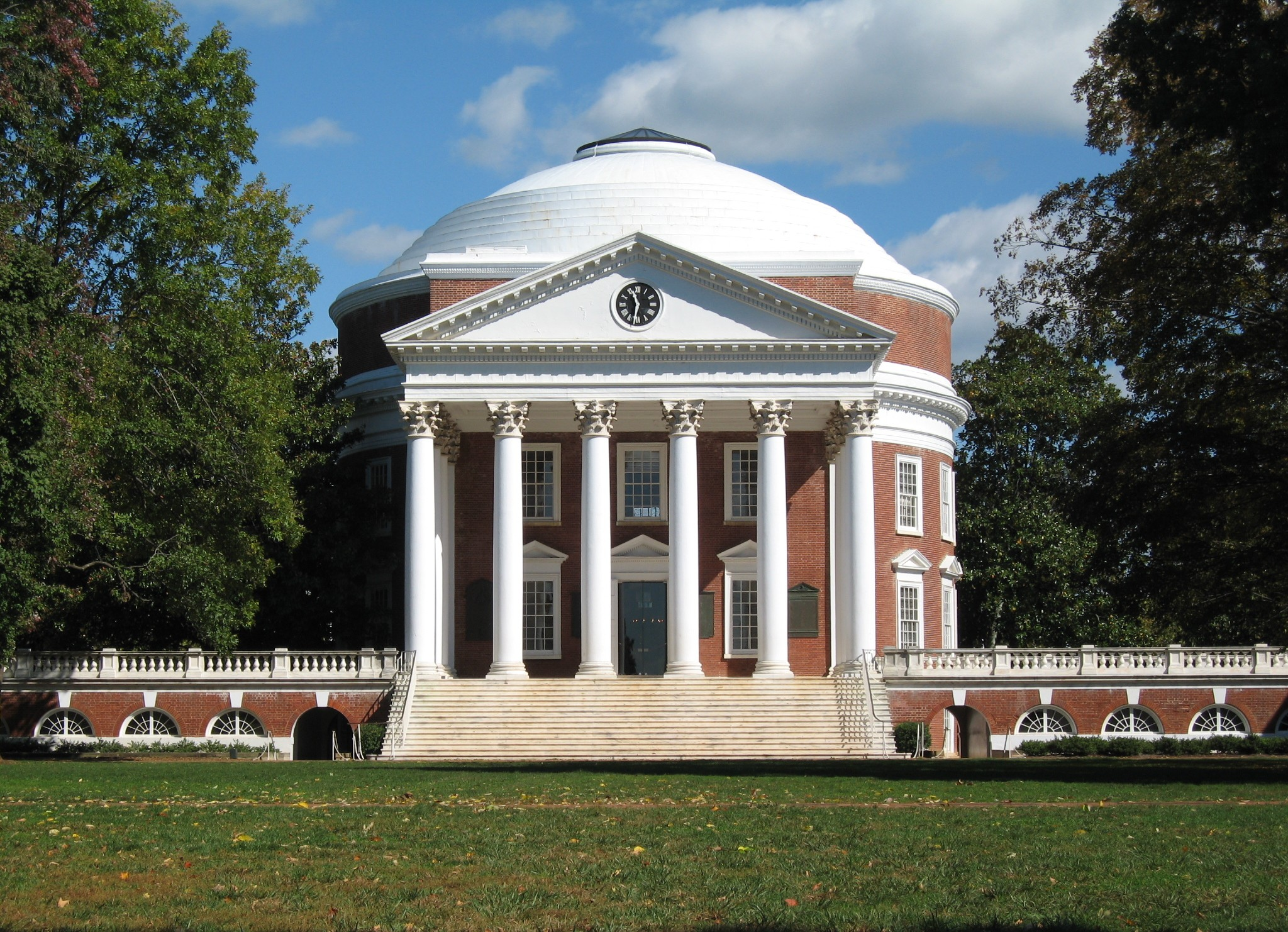
- The Rotunda at the University
- Awarded for: Merit-based to high school seniors
- Description: full scholarship to attend the University of Virginia
- Sponsored by: Jefferson Scholars Foundation
- Location: Charlottesville, Virginia, US
- Post-nominals: JS
- Established: 1981
- Website: jeffersonscholars.org

The Jefferson Scholarship is a merit scholarship that provides four years of fully funded study at the University of Virginia in the United States. The scholarship covers tuition and room and board, and also provides money for summer travel, independent research, and study abroad. Application to the scholarship is by invitation only. Around 30 "Scholars" are selected annually from some 7,000 schools who may each nominate one student. Considered one of the most prestigious scholarships in the United States, Scholars have included 24 Rhodes Scholars and Marshall Scholars, Olympians, Pulitzer Prize winners, and others.

== History ==
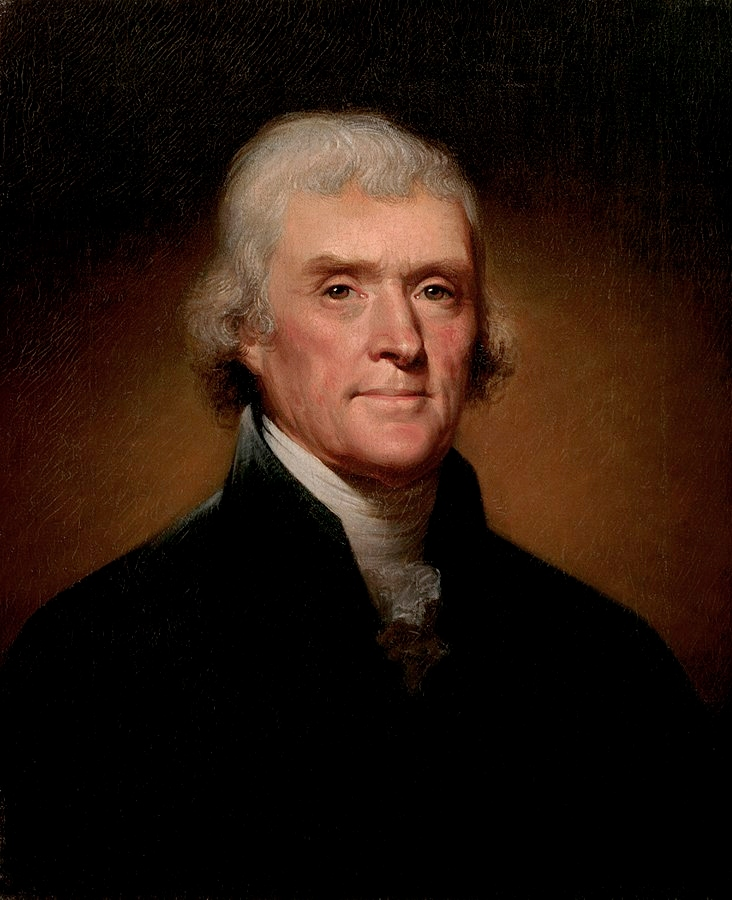
Thomas Jefferson, benefactor of the University of Virginia

In 1981, the first Jefferson Scholarship was endowed and named for Thomas Jefferson, the third President of the United States and a benefactor of the University of Virginia. The program has grown since with the support of benefactors and endowments. As of 2024, the endowment was $874.9 million and supported 139 scholars. Out-of-state recipients receive in excess of $370,000, as of 2024.

=== Selection criteria ===
The Jefferson Scholars Foundation aims to identify, attract, and nurture "individuals of extraordinary intellectual range and depth who possess the highest concomitant qualities of: Leadership, Scholarship, and Citizenship".

Scholars are nominated as the most accomplished student at their respective school, and then compete through a series of interview rounds from local to regional, national and the finals, which are held in Charlottesville, Virginia. There are currently 70 nominating regions, with over 7,000 schools eligible to nominate a student, and a pool of students exceeding 800,000. In 2020, over 2,100 high schools nominated students; 34 were selected, or less than 2% of the nominees.

Designation	Number of candidates	Ratio	Percent
Graduating seniors at designated schools	840,000 (approx.) eligible to apply	1 in 1	100%
Jefferson Scholar Candidate	2100 (approx.)	1 in 400	0.25%
Jefferson Scholar	30	1 in 28000	0.00357%

== Enrichment programmes ==
=== Institute for Leadership & Citizenship ===
The Leadership and Citizenship Institute is a two-week seminar for all Scholars, taking place at the end of their freshman year. It is held on the grounds of the University of Virginia, and consists of workshops, group discussions and personal exploration, and is designed to foster and develop the characteristics of leadership and citizenship in scholars.

=== Travel ===
Scholars are encouraged to partake in foreign travel and study after their sophomore year, and invited to undertake a self-designed exploration into a topic of personal interest. Many also take the opportunity to study at one of the university's partners for a semester.

=== Exploratory Fund ===
The Exploratory Fund, as an initiative of the Foundation, provides seed funding for Scholars' projects and concepts. Developed to support the innovation of Scholars, the Foundation encourages Scholars to build projects that serve societal and cultural development. New commercial or philanthropic enterprises within or outside the university can also apply for funding consideration.

== Notable alumni ==
- Maurie McInnis, 24th president of Yale University
- Jia Tolentino, author and writer for The New Yorker
- Melissa Murray, legal commentator and professor at New York University School of Law
- Meghan O'Leary, Olympic rower
- Kevin G. Ritz, U.S. Circuit Judge of the United States Court of Appeals for the Sixth Circuit
- Andrew Oldham, U.S. Circuit Judge of the United States Court of Appeals for the Fifth Circuit
- Jasmine H. Yoon, U.S. District Judge of the United States District Court for the Western District of Virginia
- Peter D. Leary, former United States Attorney for the Middle District of Georgia
- M. Lisa Manning, American physicist and professor of physics at Syracuse University
- W. Bradford Wilcox, American sociologist
- Payvand Ahdout, law professor at University of Virginia School of Law

== See also ==
- Morehead-Cain Scholarship
- Robertson Scholars Program
- Boettcher Scholarship
- Levine Scholarship
