= Alyson Brooks =

Theoretical astrophysicist

- Born: Minnesota
- Education: Macalester College; University of Washington
- Known for: Dwarf galaxy formation; lambda-cold-dark-matter simulations
- Awards: Maria Goeppert Mayer Award
- Scientific career
- Fields: Theoretical astrophysics
- Workplaces: Caltech; University of Wisconsin–Madison; Rutgers University
- Thesis: The role of gas in the evolution of disk galaxies (2008)
- Doctoral advisor: Fabio Governato
- Website: http://www.physics.rutgers.edu/~abrooks/

Alyson Brooks is an American theoretical astrophysicist and professor at Rutgers University. She uses large-scale simulations to determine how galaxies form.

== Early life and education ==
Brooks grew up in Minnesota. She was interested in astronomy from a young age, and asked for a telescope as a Christmas gift when she was eight. However, she was discouraged from pursuing a career in science in her teens because of the perception that research would be isolating and unwelcoming to women. She started her undergraduate degree in English in 1996 at Macalester College. After doing well in an astronomy elective course, she was invited to join a research project and later changed her major to physics upon discovering the collaborative nature of astronomical research. She wrote an honours thesis called Boron in the small magellanic cloud: a novel test of light element formation.

From 2002 to 2008, Brooks was a graduate student at the University of Washington. She completed a master's degree in 2004, then a PhD in 2008. She was supervised by Fabio Governato. Her thesis was The role of gas in the evolution of disk galaxies.

== Career ==
Brooks completed postdoctoral fellowships at Caltech from 2008 to 2011 and then at the University of Wisconsin, Madison from 2011 to 2013. In 2013, Brooks became an assistant professor in physics at Rutgers University.

She specialises in large-scale simulations of galaxy formation starting approximately one million years after the Big Bang. These simulations can take up to months to run and require supercomputers. Her results suggest that stars and supernovae displace dark matter, reorganising the universe in a manner consistent with experimental observations which cannot directly detect dark matter. Brooks collaborates with high energy particle physicists who are interested in applying her findings to help tune dark matter astrophysical models. Her simulations use higher spatial resolution than previous efforts, allowing her to include dynamics of dwarf galaxies in addition to large structures. Dwarf galaxies are thought to contain a large proportion of dark matter, making them useful candidates for studying the evolution of the dark matter distribution including its disappearance. Brooks found that dark matter self-interactions, previously thought to be a way to indirectly observe dark matter in dwarf galaxies, may not be a significant factor after all after the Fermi Large Area Telescope delivered no positive results for a gamma ray–dark matter annihilation theory. One of her main contributions to state-of-the-art lambda-cold-dark-matter simulations is including baryonic matter despite its relatively smaller mass than dark matter.

Brooks will use the James Webb Space Telescope to image stars and dwarf galaxies in detail in the infrared, including the Messier 92 (M92) star cluster, dwarf galaxy Draco II, and the Wolf–Lundmark–Melotte (WLM) galaxy. The objective is to study how these structures formed and to track their motion.

She was an organiser of the 2019 "Inclusive Astronomy" meeting. Starting in 2014, she was a member of the American Astronomical Society's Committee on the Status of Minorities in Astronomy. Brooks is involved in mentorship activities for undergraduate students, particularly women and minorities in science.

== Awards and honours ==
- 2020 Leadership Resource Allocation Awardee to use Frontera supercomputer for project "Simulated Inside and Out: the Milky Way Galaxy at Unprecedented Resolution".
- 2019 Maria Goeppert Mayer Award for contributions to theoretical astrophysics, in particular, the use of numerical hydrodynamic simulations compared with observations to elucidate the essential physics of galaxy formation.
- 2019 Rutgers Board of Trustees Research Fellowship for Scholarly Excellence.
- 2019 Rutgers Presidential Fellowship for Teaching Excellence.
- 2017 Rutgers School of Arts & Sciences Award for Distinguished Contributions to Undergraduate Education.
- 2016 Outstanding Teaching Award from the Rutgers Society of Physics Students.
- 2015 Sloan Research Fellowship.
