= Alice White (physicist) =

American physicist

- Born: Alice Elizabeth White
- Education: Middlebury College; Harvard University
- Awards: OSA Fellow; IEEE Fellow; Bell Labs Fellow; APS Fellow; Alumni Achievement Award from Middlebury College; Maria Goeppert-Mayer Award
- Scientific career
- Fields: Physics; Engineering
- Workplaces: Bell Labs; Boston University
- Thesis: Resistance rise in ultrathin metallic wires at low temperatures (1982)
- Academic advisors: Douglas Osheroff
- Website: https://www.bu.edu/eng/profile/alice-white/

Alice Elizabeth White is an American physicist. She is a professor and chair at the Boston University College of Engineering. Previously, she was Chief Scientist at Bell Labs. She is a fellow of the APS, the IEEE and the OSA.

== Early life and education ==
White was born to physicist parents and grew up in New Jersey. Her father worked at Bell Labs. Her parents helped to foster her interest in science and mathematics.

She did her undergraduate studies at Middlebury College in Vermont, where she enjoyed a supportive science learning environment. She interned at Bell Labs during the summer through the Summer Research Program, eventually leading to a fellowship through the Graduate Research Program for Women to study at Harvard University. Her PhD thesis, completed in 1982, was entitled Resistance rise in ultrathin metallic wires at low temperatures. She was mentored by Doug Osheroff of Bell Labs during her time at Harvard.

== Career ==
White returned to Bell Labs after her PhD, and occupied various roles in the organisation from 1982 to 2013. She spent two years as a post-doctoral fellow before joining the permanent technical staff. Her last position was Chief Scientist. Her research areas during this period include mesotaxy techniques to grow metals on silicon, photonic circuitry, fiber optics and low temperature physics.

White became chair of Boston University's mechanical engineering department in 2013 after 30 years at Bell Labs. She is a professor of mechanical engineering, materials science, biomedical engineering, and physics. She is also affiliated with Boston University's Photonics and Nanotechnology centers. She is interested in nanomechanics. One potential application of her research is in creating biomedical structures to repair tissues after a heart attack. She uses 3D printing technology to create micromechanical structures. In 2014, she established the Multiscale Laser Lithography Lab at Boston University. This facility houses a Direct Laser Writing tool to create 3D polymer structures at high resolution as well as systems to design and characterise samples.

White and her team worked on 3D printing nasal swab components in response to the COVID-19 pandemic.

She became a Councilor-at-Large for the APS in 1993 and was a founding member of the Forum on Industrial and Applied Physics. In 2001, she was chair of the APS Committee on the Status of Women in Physics. She is a mentor for the Bell Labs Graduate Research Program for Women, and gives physics talks at elementary schools.

== Awards and honours ==
- 2013 OSA Fellow for "developing advanced nanofabrication techniques and applying them to integrated electronics and photonics to enable next-generation lightwave devices".
- 2011 IEEE Fellow for "leadership in development and commercialization of integrated silicon optical components for communication networks".
- 2001 Bell Labs Fellow for "developing and applying novel integrated photonic device technologies in advanced optical networks".
- 1995 APS Fellow for "contributions to the study of transport phenomena in metallic thin films and for her work on buried silicide films formed by ion implantation".
- 1994 Alumni Achievement Award from Middlebury College.
- 1991 Maria Goeppert-Mayer Award from the APS.

== Personal life ==
White married another Bell Labs scientist and has two children. She enjoys skiing and cycling.
