= Randall M. Feenstra =

Randall M. Feenstra is a Canadian physicist. He completed a bachelor's degree in engineering physics at the University of British Columbia in 1978, followed by his master's and doctorate in applied physics at the California Institute of Technology. From 1982 to 1995, he was a research staff member at the IBM Thomas J. Watson Research Center in Yorktown Heights, New York. Since 1995, he has taught at Carnegie Mellon University, where he conducts research in semiconductors.

Feenstra is a fellow of the American Vacuum Society, and was the 1989 recipient of its Peter Mark Memorial Award. He was elected to fellowship of the American Physical Society in 1997, "[f]or contributions to the development of the Scanning Tunneling Microscope as a spectroscopic tool to probe semiconductor surfaces and surface phenomena," and was awarded the APS Davisson–Germer Prize in Atomic or Surface Physics in 2019, "[f]or pioneering developments of the techniques and concepts of spectroscopic scanning tunneling microscopy."
