= Marjorie Olmstead =

American physicist

Marjorie Ann Olmstead
- Education: Swarthmore College (BA); University of California, Berkeley (MA, PhD)
- Scientific career
- Fields: Physics
- Workplaces: Xerox Palo Alto Research Center; University of California, Berkeley; University of Washington
- Thesis: Optical properties and atomic structure of cleaved silicon and germanium surfaces as determined by photothermal displacement spectroscopy (1985)

Marjorie Ann Olmstead is an American condensed matter physicist.

== Education ==
Olmstead majored in physics at Swarthmore College for her B.A. and graduated with highest honours in 1979. After her junior year, she worked at Bell Labs for a summer through a research program to support women and minority groups, where she became interested in the interactions between semiconductors and insulators when creating stacks. She received her M.A. in 1982 and her PhD in 1985, both from the University of California, Berkeley.

== Career ==
After graduating, Olmstead took position at the Xerox Palo Alto Research Center in 1985. Though she could have stayed there permanently, she was interested in teaching and applied for faculty positions. She became assistant professor at the University of California, Berkeley in 1986.

Olmstead is currently a professor at the University of Washington. She also acts as Undergraduate Faculty Advisor, Associate Chair of physics and manages a Nanotechnology PhD Program. She was hired at UW in 1991 as an assistant professor, then became associate professor in 1993 and full professor in 1997.

Her main research focus, broadly stated, is investigating "interfaces between dissimilar materials". She develops techniques to grow and characterize high-quality thin films and layered systems including materials such as calcium fluoride, silicon and gallium arsenide.

In 1999, Olmstead was chair of the APS Committee on the Status of Women in Physics.

== Awards and honours ==
- 2002 Fellow of the American Physical Society for innovative studies of interface formation between dissimilar materials, especially the competition between thermodynamic and kinetic constraints in controlling morphologies and properties of heterostructures.
- 1999 Alexander von Humboldt Research Award Program.
- 1999 University of Washington Society of Physics Students Outstanding Undergraduate Teaching Award.
- 1996 Maria Goeppert Mayer Award for her innovative application of electron spectroscopies to surfaces and interfaces that has elucidated the importance of interfacial reactions on the structure, properties and morphology of both the interface and growing film in systems involving dissimilar materials, especially when heteroepitaxy is involved.
- 1996 Fellow of the American Vacuum Society.
- 1994 Peter Mark Memorial Award for elucidating the nature of semiconductor surfaces and the heteroepitaxial growth of insulating materials on these surfaces.
- 1989 Department of Energy "2% Initiative" Competition.
- 1987 National Science Foundation Presidential Young Investigator Award.
- 1986 IBM Faculty Development Award.

== Personal life ==
Olmstead is married and has two children.
