= Jennifer Schwarz =

American physicist

Jennifer "Jen" Marie Schwarz is an American physicist whose research applies ideas from condensed matter physics including percolation theory, jamming, dislocation avalanches, and rigidity transitions to biological structures and quantum systems. She is a professor of physics at Syracuse University.

== Education and career ==
Schwarz was a double major in history and physics at the University of Maryland, College Park, graduating magna cum laude in 1994. She went to Harvard University for graduate study in physics, receiving both a master's degree and a Ph.D. in 2002. Her dissertation, Depinning with Elastic Waves: Criticality, Hysteresis, and Even Pseudo-Hysteresis, was supervised by Daniel S. Fisher.

After postdoctoral research with M. Cristina Marchetti and A. Alan Middleton at Syracuse University, and with Andrea Liu at the University of Pennsylvania and the University of California, Los Angeles, she returned to Syracuse University as an assistant professor in 2005. She was tenured while still retaining her assistant professor rank in 2011, promoted to associate professor in 2016, and promoted again to full professor in 2021.

== Recognition ==
Schwarz was elected as a Fellow of the American Physical Society in 2023, "for influential contributions to the statistical physics of disordered systems, particularly in the development of models concerning correlated percolation, as well as models related to rigidity transitions in both living and nonliving matter".

== Selected publications ==
Schwarz selected the following:

- Lee, K.-C.; Gopinathan, A.; Schwarz, J. M. (October 2010), "Modeling the formation of in vitro filopodia", Journal of Mathematical Biology, 63 (2): 229–261, arXiv:0909.2594, doi:10.1007/s00285-010-0371-7, PMID 20957371
- Quint, D. A.; Schwarz, J. M. (December 2010), "Optimal orientation in branched cytoskeletal networks", Journal of Mathematical Biology, 63 (4): 735–755, arXiv:1008.1091, doi:10.1007/s00285-010-0389-x, PMID 21140151
- Jeng, M.; Schwarz, J. M. (January 2010), "Force-balance percolation", Physical Review E, 81 (1) 01134, arXiv:0806.1552, Bibcode:2010PhRvE..81a1134J, doi:10.1103/physreve.81.011134, PMID 20365350
- Cao, L.; Schwarz, J. M. (September 2010), "Quantum k-core conduction on the Bethe lattice", Physical Review B, 82 (10) 104211, arXiv:1005.4673, Bibcode:2010PhRvB..82j4211C, doi:10.1103/physrevb.82.104211
- Jeng, M.; Xu, S.-L.-Y.; Hawkins, E.; Schwarz, J. M. (2010), "On the nonlocality of the fractional Schrödinger equation", Journal of Mathematical Physics, 51 (6) 062102, arXiv:0810.1543, Bibcode:2010JMP....51f2102J, doi:10.1063/1.3430552, MR 2675180
