= Rama Ranganathan =

American bioengineer

- Education: University of California, Berkeley; University of California, San Diego
- Scientific career
- Fields: Bioengineering
- Workplaces: University of California, Berkeley; University of Chicago

Rama Ranganathan is an American bioengineer.

Ranganathan studied bioengineering at the University of California, Berkeley, and earned a master's degree and doctorate at the University of California, San Diego. During his tenure at the University of Texas Southwestern Medical Center, he headed the Cecil H. and Ida Green Center for Systems Biology, and was a Howard Hughes Medical Investigator from 1997 to 2007. Ranganathan joined the University of Chicago faculty in 2017, as founding leader of the Center for Physics of Evolving Systems, a joint project of UChicago's Division of the Biological Sciences and the Institute for Molecular Engineering. In 2018, Ranganathan was appointed the Joseph Regenstein Professor in the Department of Biochemistry and Molecular Biology, as well as the Institute for Molecular Engineering.
