= Yuri Suzuki (physicist) =

American scientist

- Education: Stanford University; Harvard University
- Scientific career
- Workplaces: Cornell University; University of California, Berkeley; Stanford University
- Thesis: Structure and anisotropic transport in YBa_{2}Cu_{3}O_{7} and PrBa_{2}Cu_{3}O_{7} thin films and superlattices
- Doctoral advisor: Theodore H. Geballe

Yuri Suzuki is a Professor of Applied Physics at Stanford University. She studies novel ground states and magnetic phenomena. She is a Fellow of the American Physical Society and an American Competitiveness and Innovation Fellow of the National Science Foundation.

== Early life and education ==
Suzuki studied physics at Harvard University, graduating magna cum laude in 1989. She earned her PhD at Stanford University in 1995. Her research was supported by an ARCS Foundation and National Science Foundation Predoctoral Fellowship, studying high-temperature superconductivity. Suzuki was a postdoctoral researcher at Bell Labs from 1995 - 1996. She was appointed to the Cornell University faculty in 1997. She was part of a $11.6 million National Science Foundation centre for Nanoscale Systems in Information Technologies.

== Career ==
Suzuki joined the faculty at University of California, Berkeley in 2003. At UCBerkeley Suzuki led an NSF Nanoscale Interdisciplinary Research Team on Complex Magnetic Materials and Devices. Her group studied chalcogenide thin films and functional interfaces, magnetic junction devices and nanostructures and photonics. She is interested in the structure-property relationships of magnetic oxide thin film materials, as well as establishing the origins of magnetism at the nanoscale. She has also explored photonic crystals and optical transistors. In 2008 she was made a National Science Foundation Innovation Fellow for her "innovative research on novel magnetic heterostructures, and her exceptional contributions to broader impacts, particularly the integration of research and education involving graduate, undergraduate, and high-school students".

Suzuki is a member of the Pittsburgh Quantum Initiative. She joined Stanford University in 2012, where she studies materials for spin-current generation and detection. She is primarily located in the Department of Materials Science & Engineering, serves on the affiliated faculty of Bio-X. She is a member of the Advanced Light Source executive committee. She studies the interfaces that result in emergent magnetic and electronic phenomena. At these interfaces it is possible to observe new ground states that are not present in the bulk; such as interfacial ferromagnetism between an antiferromagnetic insulator and paramagnetic metals. Her group have also stabilised metallic ground states in correlated materials and ferromagnetic ground states in LaCaO_{3}. By studying model systems, Suzuki looks for a comprehensive understanding of their nanoscale behavior and ways to incorporate them into prototypical devices. She helped to coordinate the 2014 Materials Research Society Bulletin. Her current research considers spin transport in perovskite stannates using complex oxide heteroepitaxy. Perovskite stannates are oxide thin-films based on tin, where Suzuki incorporates magnetic dopants in an effort to access room temperature ferromagnetic semiconductors.

=== Awards and honours ===
- 2014 Department of Defense National Security Science and Engineering Fellowship
- 2012 American Physical Society Fellow
- 2008 National Science Foundation American Competitiveness and Innovation Fellow
- 2005 American Physical Society Maria Goeppert-Mayer Award
- 2002 Cornell University Outstanding Educator for having most influenced Merrill Presidential Scholar
- 1999 The Minerals, Metals & Materials Society Robert Lansing Hardy Award
- 1998 David and Lucile Packard Foundation Fellowship
- 1997 Office of Naval Research Young Investigator Award
- 1994 ARCS Foundation Fellowship
- 1998 National Science Foundation Predoctoral Fellowship
- 1997 National Science Foundation CAREER Awards
