= Peter Mark Memorial Award =

This Peter Mark Memorial Award was established in 1979 by American Vacuum Society " To recognize outstanding theoretical or experimental work by a young scientist or engineer."

Year	Recipient	Affiliation	Citation
1980	Christopher R. Brundle		
1981	Lawrence L. Kazmerski		
1982	Charles W. Magee		
1983	James Chadi		
1984	Barbara J. Garrison		
1985	Franz J. Himpsel		
1986	Richard A. Gottscho		
1987	Raymond T. Tung		
1988	Jerry Tersoff		
1989	Randall M. Feenstra		
1990	Stephen M. Rossnagel		
1991	William J. Kaiser		
1992			
1993	Robert J. Hamers		
1994	Marjorie Olmstead	University of Washington	For elucidating the nature of semiconductor surfaces and the heteroepitaxial growth of insulating materials on these surfaces.
1995	Emily Carter		
1996	Brian E. Bent		
1997	Brian S. Swartzentruber		
1998	David G. Cahill		
1999	Eray S. Aydil		
2000	Stacey F. Bent		For seminal studies of Diels-Alder chemistry at semiconductor surfaces, and for contributions to a fundamental understanding of the reaction processes underlying semiconductor growth and functionalization.
2001	Eli Rotenberg	LBNL	For furthering our knowledge of nanophase and reduced dimensionality systems by creative use of angle-resolved photoemission.
2002	Rachel S. Goldman		For contributions to the fundamental understanding of strain relaxation, alloy formation, diffusion, and the correlations among microstructure, electronic, and optical properties.
2003	Charles H. Ahn		
2004	Kathryn W. Guarini		
2005	Jane P. Chang		
2006	Mark C. Hersam		"For outstanding contributions to the development of silicon-based molecular electronics."
2007	W.M.M. Kessels		
2008	Sergei Kalinin		For pioneering work in the area of nanoelectromechanics and local properties at surfaces
2009	Beatriz Roldan Cuenya	University of Central Florida	For pioneering contributions to the understanding of processes taking place in metal nanocluster-catalyzed chemical reactions
2010	Arutiun Ehiasarian		
2011	Mohan Sankaran		
2012	E. Charles H. Sykes		For pioneering atomic-scale studies of chirality, catalysis, and molecular rotation.
2013	Daniel Gunlycke		For significant contributions to the understanding of the electronic properties of low-dimensional graphene nanostructures.
2014	Joshua Zide	University of Delaware	For pioneering work in the growth and characterization of novel electronic and photonics materials.
2015	Petro Maksymovych	Oak Ridge National Laboratory	For high level frontier chemical and physical contributions to nanoscience.

== See also ==
- List of physics awards
