= Research Corporation =

Foundation that supports scientific research

Research Corporation for Science Advancement (RCSA) is an organization in the United States devoted to the advancement of science, funding research projects in the physical sciences. It was one of the first foundations in the United States. Since 1912, RCSA has identified trends in science and education, financing many scientific research projects. It has various grants programs and strategic partnerships, and has funded the early work of at least 40 scientists who have received Nobel Prizes.

== History ==
The Research Corporation was founded in 1912 by Frederick Gardner Cottrell, scientist, inventor, environmentalist and philanthropist, with initial funding derived from the profits from his patents on the electrostatic precipitator. Research Corporation was the second foundation established in the United States (Andrew Carnegie established the Carnegie Foundation for the Advancement of Teaching in 1906) and America's first foundation devoted solely to the advancement of science. The organization is devoted to the advancement of science, funding research projects in the physical sciences. For over 100 years, RCSA has catalyzed transformative research by funding top early-career teacher-scholars at America's colleges and universities.

The Research Corporation played a major role in the minds of many scientists of the period in formulating ideal policies about the role of intellectual property in science. During the 1920s and 1930s, many scientists took out patents of their developments and assigned them to the Research Corporation in order to guarantee that any profits made from their work would be used for further scientific research (one notable example is Ernest O. Lawrence, who assigned his cyclotron patent to the company). RCSA was also a major supporter of the research that led to the presentation of Interlingua in 1951. In 1987, their invention-handing facilities became Research Corporation Technologies, a wholly independent company which handles technology transfer.

== Mission ==
RCSA seeks to identify and support ideas that could revolutionize and advance entire fields of study. At the same time, RCSA works to improve U.S. science education by advocating that faculty members enhance their teaching and contribution to society by remaining active in research and by involving undergraduates in their work. For many years the foundation has maintained that involving undergraduates in research develops critical thinking, creativity, problem solving, and intellectual independence, and promotes an innovation-oriented culture.

RCSA supports direct grants to academic scientists; conferences that leverage important scientific work that is already under way; advocacy with an emphasis on the research of early-career faculty; promulgating innovative ideas for scientific transformation; the integration of research and science teaching; interdisciplinary research; and building academic cultures that look toward tomorrow's scientific needs.

== Grants programs ==
=== Cottrell Scholar Awards ===
The Cottrell Scholar Awards program (CSA) reinforces the growing awareness that teaching and research are complementary rather than wholly or partially exclusive. RCSA believes this convergence is essential for increasing the number of students who are attracted and retained in science.

Cottrell Scholar Awards are intended to:

- Create a culture shift in PhD-granting institutions toward valuing the university scholar;
- Increase the attraction and retention of undergraduates in science;
- Increase the number of undergraduates from PhD-granting institutions pursuing graduate degrees.

The program provides $120,000 over three years to early-career faculty in chemistry, physics, astronomy, biochemistry and biophysics at major research universities. Cottrell Scholars are chosen not only for their high-quality research, but also for their dedication to the task of teaching undergraduates. There are currently nearly 500 Scholars in the United States and Canada.

Each award recipient is required to attend at least two annual conferences during the three-year term of the award. These conferences are focused on providing opportunities to share teaching knowledge as well as mentoring from previous award recipients and nationally recognized experts on such topics as navigating career paths, and balancing research and education in the research university environment. Numerous Cottrell Scholars have found the knowledge and recognition the program provides to be major motivating factors in their efforts to push through reforms in undergraduate science curricula at their universities.

In 2011, RCSA did not make any regular Cottrell Scholar Awards; instead, foundation personnel and various Cottrell Scholars focused on revamping and reorienting the program to increase its effectiveness in the coming decade. At the 2011 conference, a new synergistic organization, the Cottrell Scholar Collaborative, was launched. The Collaborative's central goal is to act collectively to change the way undergraduate science education is taught at major American universities.

=== Scialog ===
The Scialog program was created in 2010 to promote cross-disciplinary research on important global scientific themes. Its name is a portmanteau of "science" and "dialogue." Each Scialog invites 50+ early-career researchers from varying disciplines, institutions and approaches to participate in three annual conferences led by facilitators who are experts in their fields. Participants are challenged to identify ways in which they might collaborate on novel research, and to pitch their proposals at the end of the conference. RCSA and its co-sponsors award seed funding to the most promising proposals.

Scialog's unique way of promoting collaboration at conferences is being studied by a team of researchers at Northwestern University.

=== Discontinued programs ===
The Cottrell College Science Awards and Arizona Partners in Science Awards have been discontinued.

== Strategic partnerships ==
Research Corporation for Science Advancement works with corporations, fellow foundations, and government offices and agencies, as well as educational institutions, across the country.

In order to increase the breadth of its influence, in 2010 Research Corporation established a Strategic Partnerships program charged with increasing its endowment and establishing collaborations with corporations, fellow foundations, government offices and agencies.

== Presidents ==
| Years | Name | Previous roles | Education | Notes | Ref |
|---|---|---|---|---|---|
| 1912-1915 | Board of directors | - | - | - | |
| 1915-1922 | Elon Huntington Hooker | Founder of Hooker Electrochemical Company | University of Rochester bachelor's, Cornell University PhD | Chemist, hydrodynamic engineer | |
| 1922-1927 | Arthur A. Hamerschlag | Engineer for the US Government in Cuba and Mexico (1888-1892), President of Carnegie Institute of Technology (1903-1921) | | | |
| 1927-1945 | Howard Andrews Poillon | Mucker in Alaskan gold mines (1900-1910), Manager of Vanadium Mines (1910-?), Director of RCSA (1920-1927) | Spent one year at Columbia University School of Mines | Formed an engineering consulting firm for mining | |
| 1946-1957 | Joseph Warren Barker | US Army Officer (?-1925), Professor of Electrical Engineering at MIT, Dean of Engineering Faculty at Columbia University (?-?), Special Assistant to the Secretary of the Navy (World War II) | MIT graduate (1916) | Navy Distinguished Civilian Service Award recipient | |
| 1957-1967 | J. William Hinkley | Central Hudson Gas & Electric Corp. (1927-1943), Staff at MIT's Radiation Laboratory (1943-1944), Manager of RCSA's Research Construction Company (1945-1946), Director of RCSA's Patent Management Division (1946-1957) | | Died during his tenureship | |
| 1968-1982 | James Stacy Coles | Chemistry Professor at City College of New York and Middlebury College (?-?), Research Supervisor at Woods Hole Oceanographic Institution (World War II), Acting Dean and Chemistry Professor at Brown University (?-?), President of Bowdoin College (?-1967) | Degrees from Mansfield State Teachers College and Columbia University | Retired in 1982 but remained Chairman of the RCSA's executive committee until 1984 | |
| 1982-2002 | John P. Schaefer | Assistant Professor of Chemistry at University of California, Berkeley (?-1960); Chemistry Department Head and Dean of the College of Liberal Arts (?-1971), and President of University of Arizona (1971-1982) | Helped found the Center for Creative Photography | Polytechnic Institute bachelor's in chemistry, University of Illinois Urbana-Champaign PhD in chemistry, California Institute of Technology postdoc | |
| 2002 | Michael P. Doyle | Taught at University of Arizona, Nankai University, Hope College, and Trinity University; Chemistry and Biochemistry Department Chair at University of Maryland (2003-?); Medicinal Chemistry Department Chair at University of Texas at San Antonio (?-present) | Attended University of St. Thomas and Iowa State University; University of Illinois, Chicago postdoc | | |
| 2002-2005 | John P. Schaefer | - | - | Resumed presidency | |
| 2005-2013 | James M. Gentile | Dean for the Natural Sciences and Endowed Chair in Biology at Hope College | Saint Mary's University of Minnesota bachelor's and Illinois State University Master's and PhD, Yale School of Medicine postdoc | Received the Alexander Hollaender Research Excellence Award from the EMGS and the Cancer Research Medallion from the National Cancer Institute of Japan; AAAS Fellow | |
| 2014-2017 | Robert N. Shelton | President of Giant Magellan Telescope Organization (?-?), President of University of Arizona (2006-2011), Executive Director of the Arizona Sports Foundation (2011-2014) | | Novel materials physicist | |
| 2017 | Daniel Gasch | | | Interim president | |
| 2017- 2025 | Daniel I. Linzer | Assistant Professor (1984-?), Associate Dean (1998-2002), Dean (2002-2007), Provost (2007-2017), and Professor of Biochemistry, Molecular Biology, and Cell Biology at Northwestern University | Yale University bachelor's in molecular biophysics and biochemistry (1976), Princeton University PhD in biochemical science (1980), NIH postdoc at Johns Hopkins School of Medicine | | |
| 2025- present | Eric D. Isaacs | President of the Carnegie Institute for Science (2018-2024). Previously Executive Vice President for Research, Innovation and National Laboratories at the University of Chicago, Provost at the University of Chicago and director of the Argonne National Laboratory. Director of the Semiconductor and Materials Physics departments at Bell Laboratories (1990s). | B.A. in physics from Beloit College, Ph.D. in physics from Massachusetts Institute of Technology, postdoctoral fellow at Bell Laboratories. | | |

== Nobel laureates ==
Research Corporation for Science Advancement has funded the early work of at least 40 scientists who have received Nobel Prizes.

| Year | Name | Category | RCSA grant(s) | Research topic | Ref |
|---|---|---|---|---|---|
| 1934 | Harold C. Urey | Chemistry | 1938 | Isotopes | |
| 1939 | Ernest O. Lawrence | Physics | 1931 (renewed 1934, 1935, 1937, 1938), 1939 (renewed 1940, 1941, 1942) | Cyclotron (1931), nuclear physics (1939) | |
| 1944 | Isidor Isaac Rabi | Physics | 1931, 1937 (renewed 1938, 1939, 1940) | Molecular beam research (1931), magnetic moment of the atom (1937) | |
| 1946 | Percy W. Bridgman | Physics | 1954 | Properties of matter under pressure with a particular reference to the properties of alloys | |
| 1950 | Edward C. Kendall | Physiology or Medicine | 1942 (1943, 1944) | Cortical hormones | |
| 1952 | Felix Bloch | Physics | 1939, 1946 (renewed 1947, 1948) | Low voltage generator (1939), nuclear induction and its application to polarized neutrons (1946) | |
| 1952 | Edward M. Purcell | Physics | 1946, 1948 | Resonance absorption by nuclear magnetic moments | |
| 1958 | George Beadle | Physiology or Medicine | 1944 | Induction and detection of biochemical mutations in Neurospora crassa | |
| 1958 | Edward L. Tatum | Physiology or Medicine | 1946, 1947, 1971, 1974 | Use of isotopes in the study of biosynthesis of amino acids (1946, 1947), characterization of enzymes of morphological mutants of Neurospora (1971, 1974) | |
| 1959 | Severo Ochoa | Physiology or Medicine | 1941, 1944, 1951 | Intermediary carbohydrate metabolism (1941), respiratory enzymes and the mechanism of the biological oxidation of pyruvic acid (1944), enzyme systems involved in biological oxidations and syntheses (1971) | |
| 1961 | Robert Hofstadter | Physics | 1950 | Nuclear electric charge distribution by experiments on the elastic scattering of electrons from nuclei | |
| 1964 | Feodor Lynen | Physiology or Medicine | 1954 | Biosynthesis of the fatty acids and isoprene derivatives | |
| 1965 | Robert B. Woodward | Chemistry | 1949 (renewed 1950, 1951, 1952, 1953), 1957 | Synthesis of cortisone (1949), structure and synthesis of chlorophyll (1957) | |
| 1967 | Manfred Eigen | Chemistry | 1954 | Velocity and mechanism of high speed ionic reactions | |
| 1968 | Robert W. Holley | Physiology or Medicine | 1958 | Chemistry of intermediates in protein synthesis | |
| 1969 | Max Delbrück | Physiology or Medicine | 1958 | Production, characterization and mapping of the phage T2L | |
| 1973 | Ernst Otto Fischer | Chemistry | 1961 | Extension of metal microanalysis | |
| 1976 | William N. Lipscomb Jr. | Chemistry | 1959 | Determination of the molecular structure of an enzyme, a proteinase from Tetrahymena pyriformis W, by x-ray diffraction methods | |
| 1979 | Herbert C. Brown | Chemistry | 1948, 1949 | Effects of structure on the chemistry of addition compounds | |
| 1979 | George Wald | Physiology or Medicine | 1942 (renewed 1943), 1949 | Physiological action of thiamin in neuromuscular systems (1942), cozymase-destroying systems in the tissues of freshwater fishes or the conversion of β-Carotene to vitamin A in vitro (1949) | |
| 1979 | Georg Wittig | Chemistry | 1955 | Organic anion chemistry | |
| 1986 | Dudley Herschbach | Chemistry | 1998 | Mechanical means to decelerate gaseous molecules | |
| 1987 | Donald J. Cram | Chemistry | 1951 | Macro-ring compounds containing aromatic nuclei as part of the ring systems | |
| 1989 | Thomas R. Cech | Chemistry | 1977, 1978 | Photochemical crosslinking of DNA with psoralens | |
| 1990 | Elias J. Corey | Chemistry | 1958, 1959 | Synthesis of electronically unstable organic structures protected by large substituents | |
| 1992 | Rudolph A. Marcus | Chemistry | 1954, 1956 | Behavior of the dicarboxylate ions | |
| 1992 | Edwin G. Krebs | Physiology or Medicine | 1958, 1959 | Immunochemical studies on glycolytic enzymes | |
| 1993 | Joseph H. Taylor Jr. | Physics | 1970 | Temporal variation of pulsars | |
| 1995 | Frederick Reines | Physics | 1959 (unrestricted), 1961 | Neurons and gamma-rays of extraterrestrial origin | |
| 1996 | Robert C. Richardson | Physics | 1972, 1973 | Possible superfluid properties of liquid 3He | |
| 1996 | Robert F. Curl Jr. | Chemistry | 1958 | Microwave spectra of radicals and molecules | |
| 1996 | Richard E. Smalley | Chemistry | 1976, 1977 | Supersonic molecular beam laser spectroscopy of photoactive molecules | |
| 1999 | Ahmed H. Zewail | Chemistry | 1976 | Energy transport in high-dimensional solids | |
| 2000 | Alan G. MacDiarmid | Chemistry | 1956, 1957, 1959 | Silico-ethyl (SiH3SiH2) compounds | |
| 2001 | Carl E. Wieman | Physics | 1981 | Precision test of the Weinberg-Salam theory of weak and electromagnetic interactions | |
| 2001, 2022 | Karl B. Sharpless | Chemistry | 1971 | Chemistry of cis-dioxotransition metal species and its relevance to the action of mixed function oxygenases | |
| 2002 | Raymond Davis Jr. | Physics | 1948 | studies in the adsorption of gases by solids | |
