= Jack Harlan =

American botanist (1917–1998)

Jack Rodney Harlan (June 7, 1917 – August 26, 1998) was an American botanist, agronomist, plant collector, and campaigner for crop plant biodiversity conservation.

== Early life ==
Born in Washington, DC, Jack Harlan was the son of Harry Harlan, a plant breeder who worked on barley at the US Department of Agriculture (USDA), and who travelled around the world on seed collecting expeditions in search of new genetic material for use the USDA's crop breeding programs. Harry Harlan was a friend of the famous Russian plant breeding expert Nikolai Vavilov, and at the age of fifteen Jack Harlan met Vavilov when the latter stayed at the Harlan house during an international conference. This meeting inspired Jack to become a plant collector himself, and plans were made for him to travel to Russia after finishing his undergraduate degree to work with Vavilov. However the trip was cancelled as a result of Vavilov's deteriorating relationship with the Soviet authorities.

== University study and career ==
Harlan earned a B.S. from George Washington University in 1938. He went on to study under the famous botanist and geneticist G. Ledyard Stebbins at the University of California, where he received a Ph.D. in genetics in 1942.

From 1942 to 1951 he worked at the U.S. Department of Agriculture, where he worked on breeding forage crops and improving the grazing quality of rangelands in Oklahoma.

In 1951 Harlan became a university lecturer and researcher, working first as a professor of agronomy at Oklahoma State University at Stillwater, Oklahoma, where he refused to sign an oath of loyalty, and later as a professor of plant genetics at the University of Illinois Urbana-Champaign. He co-founded the Crop Evolution Laboratory there in 1966.

He moved to New Orleans, Louisiana in the 1980s and served as an adjunct professor at Tulane University. Harlan published a variety of papers in the area of crop biodiversity, and publicized his concerns that modern agricultural practices were contributing to the extinction of older, traditional varieties of crops.

== Plant collecting ==
As a scientist Harlan had two complementary research interests; the practical work of breeding economically important crops for desirable traits such as disease resistance or higher yield, and archaeobotany, the archeological study of the origins of crop domestication. Over the course of his career he carried out over forty plant- and seed-collecting expeditions to locations all over the world. Many of these expeditions were funded by the USDA, and the samples he brought back were added to USDA seed collections. Harlan was famous for the quality and quantity of the seed collections he brought back.

Some of Harlan's collected seeds came to be used successfully in official USDA breeding programs. For example, in 1948 Harlan and his colleague Osman Tosun collected some wheat grains in a field in eastern Turkey (it was later discovered that the grains may actually have come from Iraq, having been brought to Turkey by recent immigrants). The sample was added to the USDA's seed bank as PI 178383. Fifteen years later in the early 1960s there was a severe epidemic of stripe rust, and hundreds of seed collections were tested for resistance to the rust. PI 178383 turned out to be resistant, not only to the stripe rust, but to several other wheat diseases as well, and it was added to breeding programs to produce new, resistant varieties, which were widely grown in America's northwestern states.

== Views on the origins of crop plant genetic diversity ==
Harlan agreed broadly with Vavilov's idea that just a few geographical locations are crucial for generating much of the biodiversity on which plant breeders depend. However Harlan preferred the term center of diversity to Vavilov's term center of origin, because while the centers of crop diversity are known and mapped, the origins of crops cannot be definitely pinned down. In The Living Fields: Our Agricultural Heritage he wrote:

First, we will not and cannot find a time or place where agriculture originated. We will not and cannot because it did not happen that way. Agriculture is not the result of a happening, an idea, an invention, discovery or instruction by a god or goddess. It emerged as a result of long periods of intimate coevolution between plants and man... The coevolution took place over millennia and over vast regions measured in terms of thousands of kilometers. There were many independent tentatives in many locations that fused over time to produce effective food production systems. Origins are diffuse in both time and space.

== Awards ==
- John Simon Guggenheim Memorial Fellowship (1959)
- American Grassland Council Merit Award (1962)
- Frank N. Meyer Memorial Medal for Plant Genetic Resources, awarded by the Crop Science Society of America (1971)
- International Service in Agronomy Award (1976)
- Distinguished Botanist Award, awarded by the Society for Economic Botany (1986)
- Vavilov Medal, awarded during the Vavilov Centennial Celebration in Moscow and St. Petersburg (1987)

== Publications ==
=== as author ===
- 1956, Theory and Dynamics of Grassland Agriculture, Jack R. Harlan, Van Nostrand
- 1976, Crops and Man, Jack R. Harlan, American Society of Agronomy
- 1995, The Living Fields: Our Agricultural Heritage, Jack R. Harlan, Cambridge University Press

=== as editor ===
- 1976, Origins of African Plant Domestication, edited with Jan M. J. De Wet and Ann B. L. Stemler, Mouton Publishers
  - Origins of African Plant Domestication. Walter de Gruyter. 24 June 2011. ISBN 978-3-11-080637-3; pbk reprint
