= Plant breeding =

Science of changing the traits of plants

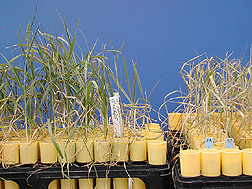
The Yecoro wheat (right) cultivar is sensitive to salinity, plants resulting from a hybrid cross with cultivar W4910 (left) show greater tolerance to high salinity

Plant breeding is the science of changing the traits of plants in order to produce desired characteristics. It is used to improve the quality of plant products for use by humans and animals. The goals of plant breeding are to produce crop varieties that boast unique and superior traits for a variety of applications. The most frequently addressed agricultural traits are those related to biotic and abiotic stress tolerance, grain or biomass yield, end-use quality characteristics such as taste or the concentrations of specific biological molecules (proteins, sugars, lipids, vitamins, fibers) and ease of processing (harvesting, milling, baking, malting, blending, etc.).

Plant breeding can be performed using many different techniques, ranging from the selection of the most desirable plants for propagation, to methods that make use of knowledge of genetics and chromosomes, to more complex molecular techniques. Genes in a plant are what determine what type of qualitative or quantitative traits it will have. Plant breeders strive to create a specific outcome of plants and potentially new plant varieties, and in the course of doing so, narrow down the genetic diversity of that variety to a specific few biotypes.

It is practiced worldwide by individuals such as gardeners and farmers, and by professional plant breeders employed by organizations such as government institutions, universities, crop-specific industry associations or research centers. International development agencies believe that breeding new crops is important for ensuring food security by developing new varieties that are higher yielding, disease resistant, drought tolerant or regionally adapted to different environments and growing conditions.

A 2023 study shows that without plant breeding, Europe would have produced 20% fewer arable crops over the last 20 years, consuming an additional 21.6 million hectares (53 million acres) of land and emitting 4 billion tonnes (3.9×10^{9} long tons; 4.4×10^{9} short tons) of carbon. Wheat species created for Morocco are currently being crossed with plants to create new varieties for northern France. Soy beans, which were previously grown predominantly in the south of France, are now grown in southern Germany.

== History ==
Plant breeding started with sedentary agriculture and particularly the domestication of the first agricultural plants, a practice which is estimated to date back 9,000 to 11,000 years. Initially early farmers simply selected food plants with particular desirable characteristics, and employed these as progenitors for subsequent generations, resulting in an accumulation of valuable traits over time.

Gregor Mendel (1822–84) is considered the "father of genetics". His experiments with plant hybridization led to his establishing laws of inheritance. Genetics stimulated research to improve crop production through plant breeding.

Selective breeding played a crucial role in the Green Revolution of the 20th century.

Modern plant breeding is applied genetics, but its scientific basis is broader, covering molecular biology, cytology, systematics, physiology, pathology, entomology, chemistry, and statistics (biometrics). It has also developed its own technology.

== Classical plant breeding ==
Selective breeding enlarged desired traits of the wild cabbage plant (Brassica oleracea) over hundreds of years, resulting in dozens of today's agricultural crops. Cabbage, kale, broccoli, and cauliflower are all cultivars of this plant.

One major technique of plant breeding is selection, the process of selectively propagating plants with desirable characteristics and eliminating or "culling" those with less desirable characteristics.

Another technique is the deliberate interbreeding (crossing) of closely or distantly related individuals to produce new crop varieties or lines with desirable properties. Plants are crossbred to introduce traits/genes from one variety or line into a new genetic background. For example, a mildew-resistant pea may be crossed with a high-yielding but susceptible pea, the goal of the cross being to introduce mildew resistance without losing the high-yield characteristics. Progeny from the cross would then be crossed with the high-yielding parent to ensure that the progeny were most like the high-yielding parent, (backcrossing). The progeny from that cross would then be tested for yield (selection, as described above) and mildew resistance and high-yielding resistant plants would be further developed. Plants may also be crossed with themselves to produce inbred varieties for breeding. Pollinators may be excluded through the use of pollination bags.

Classical breeding relies largely on homologous recombination between chromosomes to generate genetic diversity. The classical plant breeder may also make use of a number of in vitro techniques such as protoplast fusion, embryo rescue or mutagenesis (see below) to generate diversity and produce hybrid plants that would not exist in nature.

Traits that breeders have tried to incorporate into crop plants include:

1. Improved quality, such as increased nutrition, improved flavor, or greater beauty
2. Increased yield of the crop
3. Increased tolerance of environmental pressures (salinity, extreme temperature, drought)
4. Resistance to viruses, fungi and bacteria
5. Increased tolerance to insect pests
6. Increased tolerance of herbicides
7. Longer storage period for the harvested crop

=== Before World War II ===
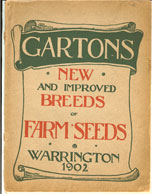
Garton's catalogue from 1902

Gartons Agricultural Plant Breeders in England was established in 1880, which became a public company in 1898, by John Garton, who was one of the first to commercialize new varieties of agricultural crops created through cross-pollination. The firm's first introduction was the Abundance Oat, an oat variety. It is one of the first agricultural grain varieties bred from a controlled cross, introduced to commerce in 1892.

In the early 20th century, plant breeders realized that Gregor Mendel's findings on the non-random nature of inheritance could be applied to seedling populations produced through deliberate pollinations to predict the frequencies of different types. Wheat hybrids were bred to increase the crop production of Italy during the so-called "Battle for Grain" (1925–1940). Heterosis was explained by George Harrison Shull. It describes the tendency of the progeny of a specific cross to outperform both parents. The detection of the usefulness of heterosis for plant breeding has led to the development of inbred lines that reveal a heterotic yield advantage when they are crossed. Maize was the first species where heterosis was widely used to produce hybrids.

Statistical methods were also developed to analyze gene action and distinguish heritable variation from variation caused by environment. In 1933 another important breeding technique, cytoplasmic male sterility (CMS), developed in maize, was described by Marcus Morton Rhoades. CMS is a maternally inherited trait that makes the plant produce sterile pollen. This enables the production of hybrids without the need for labor-intensive detasseling.

These early breeding techniques resulted in large yield increase in the United States in the early 20th century. Similar yield increases were not produced elsewhere until after World War II, the Green Revolution increased crop production in the developing world in the 1960s.

=== After World War II ===
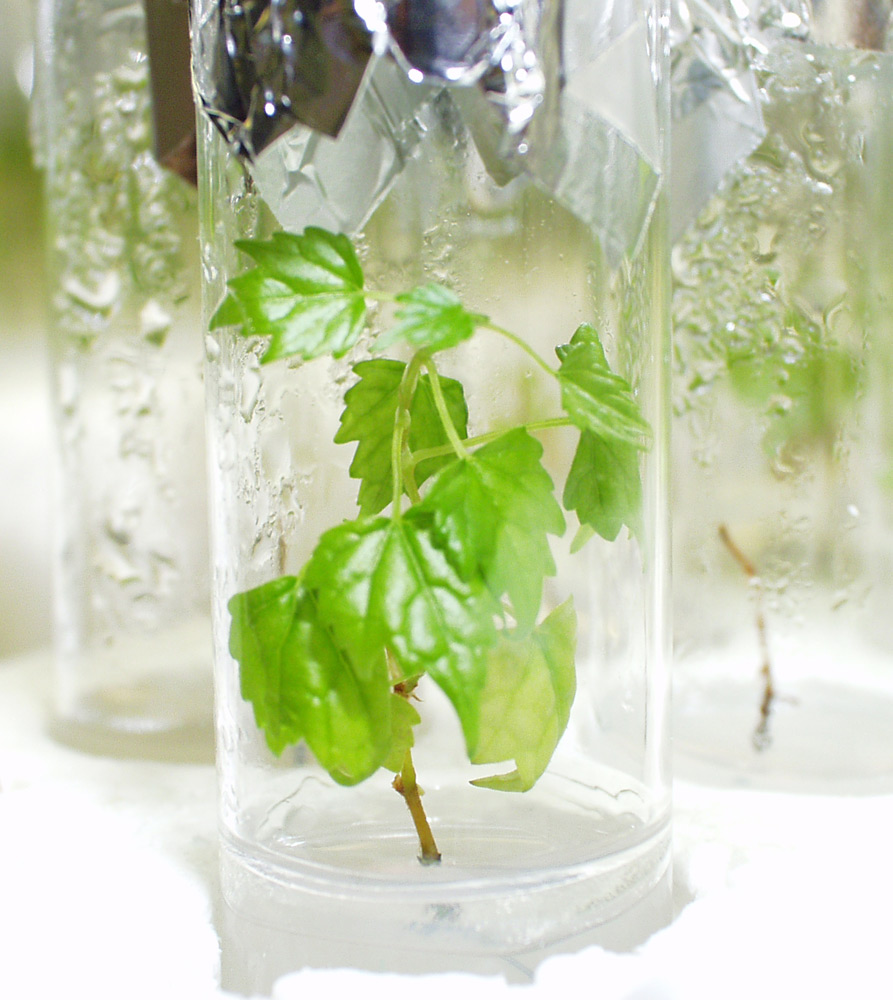
In vitro-culture of Vitis (grapevine), Geisenheim Grape Breeding Institute

Following World War II a number of techniques were developed that allowed plant breeders to hybridize distantly related species, and artificially induce genetic diversity.

When distantly related species are crossed, plant breeders make use of a number of plant tissue culture techniques to produce progeny from otherwise fruitless mating. Interspecific and intergeneric hybrids are produced from a cross of related species or genera that do not normally sexually reproduce with each other. These crosses are referred to as Wide crosses. For example, the cereal triticale is a wheat and rye hybrid. The cells in the plants derived from the first generation created from the cross contained an uneven number of chromosomes and as a result was sterile. The cell division inhibitor colchicine was used to double the number of chromosomes in the cell and thus allow the production of a fertile line.

Failure to produce a hybrid may be due to pre- or post-fertilization incompatibility. If fertilization is possible between two species or genera, the hybrid embryo may abort before maturation. If this does occur the embryo resulting from an interspecific or intergeneric cross can sometimes be rescued and cultured to produce a whole plant. Such a method is referred to as embryo rescue. This technique has been used to produce new rice for Africa, an interspecific cross of Asian rice Oryza sativa and African rice O. glaberrima.

Hybrids may also be produced by a technique called protoplast fusion. In this case protoplasts are fused, usually in an electric field. Viable recombinants can be regenerated in culture.

Mutagens like ethyl methanesulfonate (EMS) and dimethyl sulfate (DMS), and radiation are used for mutagenesis. The breeder hopes for desirable traits to arise in the mutated germplasm so that they can be used in new cultivars – a process known as mutation breeding. Classical plant breeders can also generate genetic diversity within a species by exploiting a process called somaclonal variation, which occurs in plants produced from tissue culture, particularly plants derived from callus. Induced polyploidy, and the addition or removal of chromosomes using a technique called chromosome engineering may also be used.

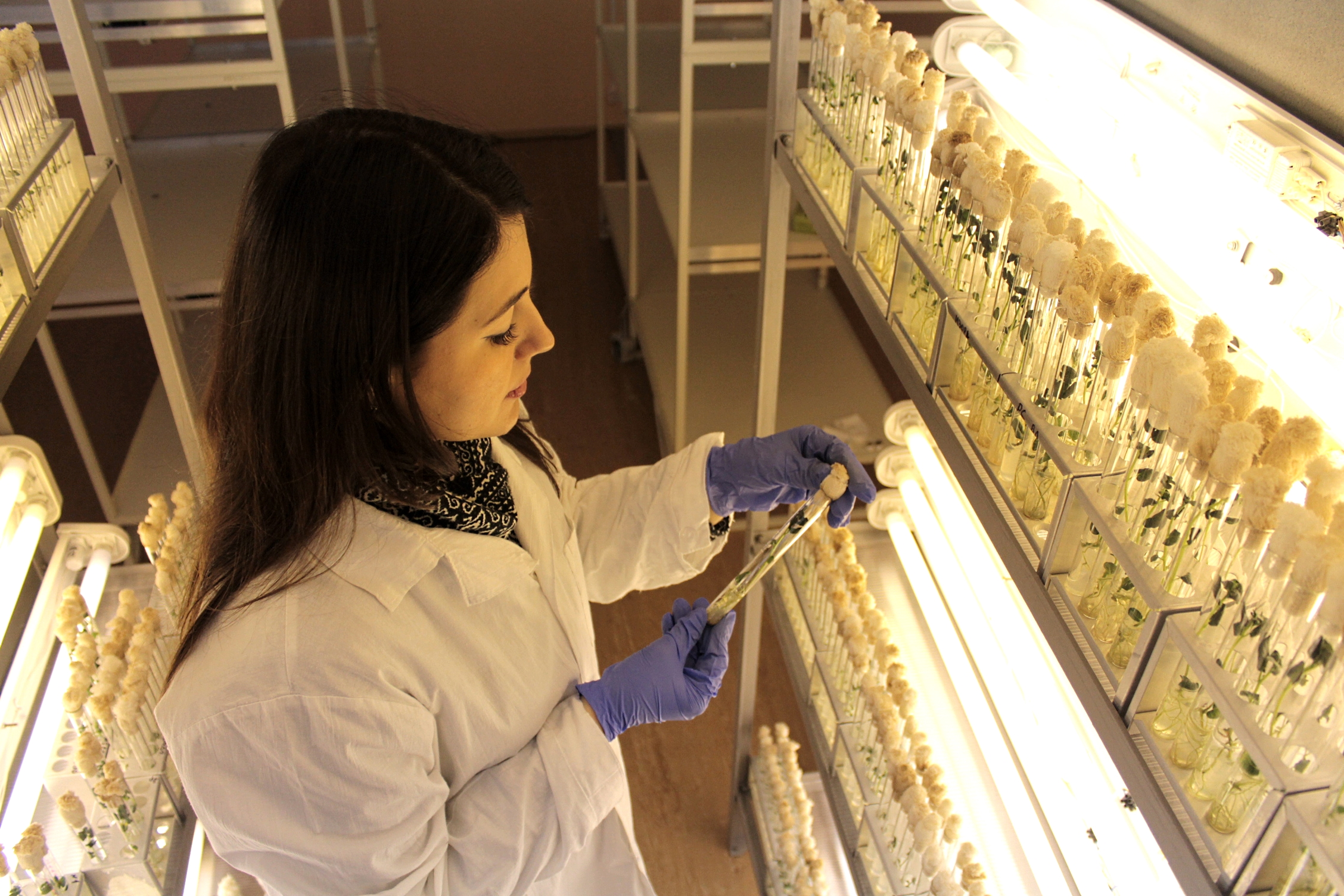
Agricultural research on potato plants

When a desirable trait has been bred into a species, a number of crosses to the favored parent are made to make the new plant as similar to the favored parent as possible. Returning to the example of the mildew resistant pea being crossed with a high-yielding but susceptible pea, to make the mildew resistant progeny of the cross most like the high-yielding parent, the progeny will be crossed back to that parent for several generations (See backcrossing). This process removes most of the genetic contribution of the mildew resistant parent. Classical breeding is therefore a cyclical process.

With classical breeding techniques, the breeder does not know exactly what genes have been introduced to the new cultivars. Some scientists therefore argue that plants produced by classical breeding methods should undergo the same safety testing regime as genetically modified plants. There have been instances where plants bred using classical techniques have been unsuitable for human consumption, for example the poison solanine was unintentionally increased to unacceptable levels in certain varieties of potato through plant breeding. New potato varieties are often screened for solanine levels before reaching the marketplace.

Even with the very latest in biotech-assisted conventional breeding, the incorporation of a trait into a population takes an average of seven generations for clonally propagated crops, nine for self-fertilising, and seventeen for cross-pollinating.

== Modern plant breeding ==
Modern plant breeding may use techniques of molecular biology to select, or in the case of genetic modification, to insert, desirable traits into plants. Application of biotechnology or molecular biology is also known as molecular breeding.

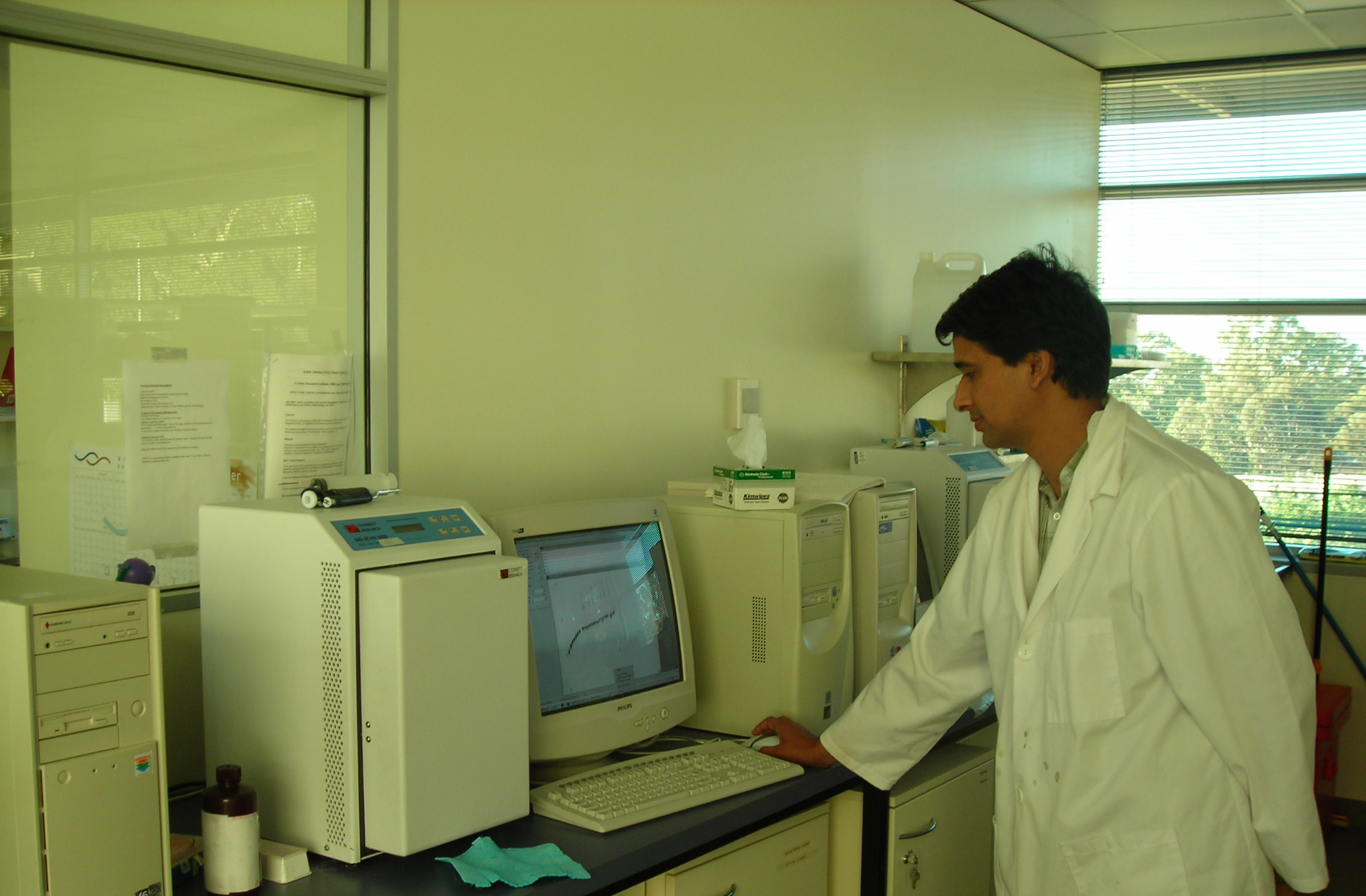
Modern facilities in molecular biology are now used in plant breeding.

=== Marker assisted selection ===
Sometimes many different genes can influence a desirable trait in plant breeding. The use of tools such as molecular markers or DNA fingerprinting can map thousands of genes. This allows plant breeders to screen large populations of plants for those that possess the trait of interest. The screening is based on the presence or absence of a certain gene as determined by laboratory procedures, rather than on the visual identification of the expressed trait in the plant. The purpose of marker assisted selection, or plant genome analysis, is to identify the location and function (phenotype) of various genes within the genome. If all of the genes are identified it leads to genome sequence. All plants have varying sizes and lengths of genomes with genes that code for different proteins, but many are also the same. If a gene's location and function is identified in one plant species, a very similar gene likely can also be found in a similar location in another related species genome.

=== Double haploids ===
Homozygous plants with desirable traits can be produced from heterozygous starting plants, if a haploid cell with the alleles for those traits can be produced, and then used to make a doubled haploid. The doubled haploid will be homozygous for the desired traits. Furthermore, two different homozygous plants created in that way can be used to produce a generation of F1 hybrid plants which have the advantages of heterozygosity and a greater range of possible traits. Thus, an individual heterozygous plant chosen for its desirable characteristics can be converted into a heterozygous variety (F1 hybrid) without the necessity of vegetative reproduction but as the result of the cross of two homozygous/doubled haploid lines derived from the originally selected plant. This shortcut has been dubbed 'reverse breeding'. Plant tissue culturing can produce haploid or double haploid plant lines and generations. This cuts down the genetic diversity taken from that plant species in order to select for desirable traits that will increase the fitness of the individuals. Using this method decreases the need for breeding multiple generations of plants to get a generation that is homogeneous for the desired traits, thereby saving much time over the natural version of the same process. There are many plant tissue culturing techniques that can be used to achieve haploid plants, but microspore culturing is currently the most promising for producing the largest numbers of them.

=== Genetic modification ===
Genetic modification of plants is achieved by adding a specific gene or genes to a plant, or by knocking down a gene with RNAi, to produce a desirable phenotype. The plants resulting from adding a gene are often referred to as transgenic plants. If for genetic modification genes of the species or of a crossable plant are used under control of their native promoter, then they are called cisgenic plants. Sometimes genetic modification can produce a plant with the desired trait or traits faster than classical breeding because the majority of the plant's genome is not altered.

To genetically modify a plant, a genetic construct must be designed so that the gene to be added or removed will be expressed by the plant. To do this, a promoter to drive transcription and a termination sequence to stop transcription of the new gene, and the gene or genes of interest must be introduced to the plant. A marker for the selection of transformed plants is also included. In the laboratory, antibiotic resistance is a commonly used marker: Plants that have been successfully transformed will grow on media containing antibiotics; plants that have not been transformed will die. In some instances markers for selection are removed by backcrossing with the parent plant prior to commercial release.

The construct can be inserted in the plant genome by genetic recombination using the bacteria Agrobacterium tumefaciens or A. rhizogenes, or by direct methods like the gene gun or microinjection. Using plant viruses to insert genetic constructs into plants is also a possibility, but the technique is limited by the host range of the virus. For example, Cauliflower mosaic virus (CaMV) only infects cauliflower and related species. Another limitation of viral vectors is that the virus is not usually passed on to the progeny, so every plant has to be inoculated.

The majority of commercially released transgenic plants are currently limited to plants that have introduced resistance to insect pests and herbicides. Insect resistance is achieved through incorporation of a gene from Bacillus thuringiensis (Bt) that encodes a protein that is toxic to some insects. For example, the cotton bollworm, a common cotton pest, feeds on Bt cotton it will ingest the toxin and die. Herbicides usually work by binding to certain plant enzymes and inhibiting their action. The enzymes that the herbicide inhibits are known as the herbicide's "target site". Herbicide resistance can be engineered into crops by expressing a version of target site protein that is not inhibited by the herbicide. This is the method used to produce glyphosate resistant ("Roundup Ready") crop plants.

Genetic modification can further increase yields by increasing stress tolerance to a given environment. Stresses such as temperature variation, are signalled to the plant via a cascade of signalling molecules which will activate a transcription factor to regulate gene expression. Overexpression of particular genes involved in cold acclimation has been shown to produce more resistance to freezing, which is one common cause of yield loss

Genetic modification of plants that can produce pharmaceuticals (and industrial chemicals), sometimes called pharming, is a rather radical new area of plant breeding.

The debate surrounding genetically modified food during the 1990s peaked in 1999 in terms of media coverage and risk perception, and continues today – for example, "Germany has thrown its weight behind a growing European mutiny over genetically modified crops by banning the planting of a widely grown pest-resistant corn variety." The debate encompasses the ecological impact of genetically modified plants, the safety of genetically modified food and concepts used for safety evaluation like substantial equivalence. Such concerns are not new to plant breeding. Most countries have regulatory processes in place to help ensure that new crop varieties entering the marketplace are both safe and meet farmers' needs. Examples include variety registration, seed schemes, regulatory authorizations for GM plants, etc.

=== Breeding and the microbiome ===
Industrial breeding of plants has unintentionally altered how agricultural cultivars associate with their microbiome. In maize, for example, breeding has altered the nitrogen cycling taxa required to the rhizosphere, with more modern lines recruiting less nitrogen fixing taxa and more nitrifiers and denitrifiers. Microbiomes of breeding lines showed that hybrid plants share much of their bacterial community with their parents, such as Cucurbita seeds and apple shoot endophytes. In addition, the proportional contribution of the microbiome from parents to offspring corresponds to the amount of genetic material contributed by each parent during breeding and domestication.

=== Phenotyping and artificial intelligence ===
As of 2020 machine learning – and especially deep machine learning – has recently become more commonly used in phenotyping. Computer vision using machine learning has made great strides and is now being applied to leaf phenotyping and other phenotyping jobs typically performed by human eyes. Pound et al. 2017 and Singh et al. 2016 are prominent examples of early successful application and demonstration of the general usability of the process across multiple target plant species. These methods work better when provided with large, publicly available open data sets.

=== Speed breeding ===
Speed breeding is introduced by Watson et al. 2018. Classical (human performed) phenotyping during speed breeding is also possible, using a procedure developed by Richard et al. 2015. As of 2020 it is highly anticipated that SB and automated phenotyping will, combined, produce greatly improved outcomes – see § Phenotyping and artificial intelligence above.

=== Genomic selection (GS) ===
The NGS platform has substantially declined the time and cost required for sequencing and facilitated SNP discovery in model and non-model plants. This in turn has led to employing large-scale SNP markers in genomic selection approaches which aim at predicting genomic breeding values/GEBVs of genotypes in a given population. This method can increase the selection accuracy and decrease the time of each breeding cycle. It has been used in different crops such as maize, wheat, etc.

== Participatory plant breeding ==
Participatory plant breeding (PPB) is when farmers are involved in a crop improvement programme with opportunities to make decisions and contribute to the research process at different stages. Participatory approaches to crop improvement can also be applied when plant biotechnologies are being used for crop improvement. Local agricultural systems and genetic diversity are strengthened by participatory programs, and outcomes are enhanced by farmers knowledge of the quality required and evaluation of the target environment.

A 2019 review of participatory plant breeding indicated that it had not gained widespread acceptance despite its record of successfully developing varieties with improved diversity and nutritional quality, as well as greater likelihood of these improved varieties being adopted by farmers. This review also found participatory plant breeding to have a better cost/benefit ratio than non-participatory approaches, and suggested incorporating participatory plant breeding with evolutionary plant breeding.

== Evolutionary plant breeding ==
Evolutionary plant breeding describes practices which use mass populations with diverse genotypes grown under competitive natural selection. Survival in common crop cultivation environments is the predominant method of selection, rather than direct selection by growers and breeders. Individual plants that are favored under prevailing growing conditions, such as environment and inputs, contribute more seed to the next generation than less-adapted individuals. Evolutionary plant breeding has been successfully used by the Nepal National Gene Bank to preserve landrace diversity within Jumli Marshi rice while reducing its susceptibility to blast disease. These practices have also been used in Nepal with bean landraces.

In 1929, Harlan and Martini proposed a method of plant breeding with heterogeneous populations by pooling an equal number of F2 seeds obtained from 378 crosses among 28 geographically diverse barley cultivars. In 1938, Harlan and Martini demonstrated evolution by natural selection in mixed dynamic populations as a few varieties that became dominant in some locations almost disappeared in others; poorly-adapted varieties disappeared everywhere.

Evolutionary breeding populations have been used to establish self-regulating plant–pathogen systems. Examples include barley, where breeders were able to improve resistance to Rynchosporium secalis scald over 45 generations. An evolutionary breeding project grew F5 hybrid bulk soybean populations on soil infested by the soybean cyst nematode and was able to increase the proportion of resistant plants from 5% to 40%. The International Center for Agricultural Research in the Dry Areas (ICARDA) evolutionary plant breeding is combined with participatory plant breeding in order to allow farmers to choose which varieties suit their needs in their local environment.

An influential 1956 effort by Coit A. Suneson to codify this approach coined the term evolutionary plant breeding and concluded that 15 generations of natural selection are desirable to produce results that are competitive with conventional breeding. Evolutionary breeding allows working with much larger plant population sizes than conventional breeding. It has also been used in tandem with conventional practices in order to develop both heterogeneous and homogeneous crop lines for low input agricultural systems that have unpredictable stress conditions.

Evolutionary plant breeding has been delineated into four stages:

- Stage 1: Genetic diversity is created, for example by manual crosses of inbreeding species or mixing of cultivars in outcrossing species.
- Stage 2: Multiplication of seeds
- Stage 3: Seeds of each cross are then mixed to produce the first generation of the Composite Cross Population (CCP). The entire offspring is sown to grow and set seed. As the number of plants in the population increases, a proportion of the harvested seed is saved for sowing.
- Stage 4: The seed can be used for continued evolutionary plant breeding or as a starting point for a conventional breeding effort.

== Issues and concerns ==
=== Breeding and food security ===
Issues facing plant breeding in the future include the lack of arable land, increasingly harsh cropping conditions and the need to maintain food security, which involves being able to provide the world population with sufficient nutrition. Crops need to be able to mature in multiple environments to allow worldwide access, which involves solving problems including drought tolerance. It has been suggested that global solutions are achievable through the process of plant breeding, with its ability to select specific genes allowing crops to perform at a level which yields the desired results. One issue facing agriculture is the loss of landraces and other local varieties which have diversity that may have useful genes for climate adaptation in the future.

Conventional breeding intentionally limits phenotype plasticity within genotypes and limits variability between genotypes. Uniformity does not allow crops to adapt to climate change and other biotic stresses and abiotic stresses.

=== Plant breeders' rights ===
Plant breeders' rights is an important and controversial issue. Production of new varieties is dominated by commercial plant breeders, who seek to protect their work and collect royalties through national and international agreements based in intellectual property rights. The range of related issues is complex. In the simplest terms, critics of the increasingly restrictive regulations argue that, through a combination of technical and economic pressures, commercial breeders are reducing biodiversity and significantly constraining individuals (such as farmers) from developing and trading seed on a regional level. Efforts to strengthen breeders' rights, for example, by lengthening periods of variety protection, are ongoing.

Intellectual property legislation for plants often uses definitions that typically include genetic uniformity and unchanging appearance over generations. These legal definitions of stability contrast with traditional agronomic usage, which considers stability in terms of how consistent the yield or quality of a crop remains across locations and over time.

As of 2020, regulations in Nepal only allow uniform varieties to be registered or released. Evolutionary plant populations and many landraces are polymorphic and do not meet these standards.

=== Environmental stressors ===
Uniform and genetically stable cultivars can be inadequate for dealing with environmental fluctuations and novel stress factors. Plant breeders have focused on identifying crops which will ensure crops perform under these conditions; a way to achieve this is finding strains of the crop that is resistance to drought conditions with low nitrogen. It is evident from this that plant breeding is vital for future agriculture to survive as it enables farmers to produce stress resistant crops hence improving food security. In countries that experience harsh winters such as Iceland, Germany and further east in Europe, plant breeders are involved in breeding for tolerance to frost, continuous snow-cover, frost-drought (desiccation from wind and solar radiation under frost) and high moisture levels in soil in winter.

=== Long-term process ===
Breeding is not a quick process, which is especially important when breeding to ameliorate a disease. The average time from human recognition of a new fungal disease threat to the release of a resistant crop for that pathogen is at least twelve years.

=== Maintaining specific conditions ===
When new plant breeds or cultivars are bred, they must be maintained and propagated. Some plants are propagated by asexual means while others are propagated by seeds. Seed propagated cultivars require specific control over seed source and production procedures to maintain the integrity of the plant breeds results. Isolation is necessary to prevent cross contamination with related plants or the mixing of seeds after harvesting. Isolation is normally accomplished by planting distance but in certain crops, plants are enclosed in greenhouses or cages (most commonly used when producing F1 hybrids).

=== Nutritional value ===
Modern plant breeding, whether classical or through genetic engineering, comes with issues of concern, particularly with regard to food crops. The question of whether breeding can have a negative effect on nutritional value is central in this respect. Although relatively little direct research in this area has been done, there are scientific indications that, by favoring certain aspects of a plant's development, other aspects may be retarded. A study published in the Journal of the American College of Nutrition in 2004, entitled Changes in USDA Food Composition Data for 43 Garden Crops, 1950 to 1999, compared nutritional analysis of vegetables done in 1950 and in 1999, and found substantial decreases in six of 13 nutrients measured, including 6% of protein and 38% of riboflavin. Reductions in calcium, phosphorus, iron and ascorbic acid were also found. The study, conducted at the Biochemical Institute, University of Texas at Austin, concluded in summary: "We suggest that any real declines are generally most easily explained by changes in cultivated varieties between 1950 and 1999, in which there may be trade-offs between yield and nutrient content."

Plant breeding can contribute to global food security as it is a cost-effective tool for increasing nutritional value of forage and crops. Improvements in nutritional value for forage crops from the use of analytical chemistry and rumen fermentation technology have been recorded since 1960; this science and technology gave breeders the ability to screen thousands of samples within a small amount of time, meaning breeders could identify a high performing hybrid quicker. The genetic improvement was mainly in vitro dry matter digestibility (IVDMD) resulting in 0.7-2.5% increase, at just 1% increase in IVDMD a single Bos Taurus also known as beef cattle reported 3.2% increase in daily gains. This improvement indicates plant breeding is an essential tool in gearing future agriculture to perform at a more advanced level.

=== Yield ===
With an increasing population, the production of food needs to increase with it. It is estimated that a 70% increase in food production is needed by 2050 in order to meet the Declaration of the World Summit on Food Security. But with the degradation of agricultural land, simply planting more crops is no longer a viable option. New varieties of plants can in some cases be developed through plant breeding that generate an increase of yield without relying on an increase in land area. An example of this can be seen in Asia, where food production per capita has increased twofold. This has been achieved through not only the use of fertilisers, but through the use of better crops that have been specifically designed for the area.

=== Role of plant breeding in organic agriculture ===
Some critics of organic agriculture claim it is too low-yielding to be a viable alternative to conventional agriculture in situations when that poor performance may be the result in part of growing poorly-adapted varieties. It is estimated that over 95% of organic agriculture is based on conventionally adapted varieties, even though the production environments found in organic vs. conventional farming systems are vastly different due to their distinctive management practices. Most notably, organic farmers have fewer inputs available than conventional growers to control their production environments. Breeding varieties specifically adapted to the unique conditions of organic agriculture is critical for this sector to realize its full potential. This requires selection for traits such as:

- Water use efficiency
- Nutrient use efficiency (particularly nitrogen and phosphorus)
- Weed competitiveness
- Tolerance of mechanical weed control
- Pest/disease resistance
- Early maturity (as a mechanism for avoidance of particular stresses)
- Abiotic stress tolerance (i.e. drought, salinity, etc...)

Currently, few breeding programs are directed at organic agriculture and until recently those that did address this sector have generally relied on indirect selection (i.e. selection in conventional environments for traits considered important for organic agriculture). However, because the difference between organic and conventional environments is large, a given genotype may perform very differently in each environment due to an interaction between genes and the environment (see gene–environment interaction). If this interaction is severe enough, an important trait required for the organic environment may not be revealed in the conventional environment, which can result in the selection of poorly adapted individuals. To ensure the most adapted varieties are identified, advocates of organic breeding now promote the use of direct selection (i.e. selection in the target environment) for many agronomic traits.

There are many classical and modern breeding techniques that can be utilized for crop improvement in organic agriculture despite the ban on genetically modified organisms. For instance, controlled crosses between individuals allow desirable genetic variation to be recombined and transferred to seed progeny via natural processes. Marker assisted selection can also be employed as a diagnostics tool to facilitate selection of progeny who possess the desired trait(s), greatly speeding up the breeding process. This technique has proven particularly useful for the introgression of resistance genes into new backgrounds, as well as the efficient selection of many resistance genes pyramided into a single individual. Molecular markers are not currently available for many important traits, especially complex ones controlled by many genes.

== List of notable plant breeders ==
- Yvonne Aitken
- Norman Borlaug
- Luther Burbank
- Keith Downey
- Thomas Andrew Knight
- Niels Ebbesen Hansen
- Nazareno Strampelli
- Nikolai Vavilov

== See also ==
- Bioactive compound
- Cisgenesis
- Crop
- Crop breeding in Nepal
- Cultivated plant taxonomy
- Double-pair mating
- EUCARPIA
- Family based QTL mapping
- Food security
- Genomics of domestication
- International Code of Nomenclature for Cultivated Plants
- Marker-assisted selection (MAS)
- Mating design
- Orthodox seed
- QTL mapping
- Recalcitrant seed
- Selection methods in plant breeding based on mode of reproduction
- Smart breeding
- Composite cross population
- Bioprospecting / biopiracy / Access and Benefit Sharing Agreement
- Plant Treaty / Convention on Biological Diversity and Nagoya Protocol
- UPOV Convention on New Varieties of Plants
- Farmers rights / Peasants' rights
- Genetic resources (disambiguation)
