= Jason Sheltzer =

Jason Sheltzer is a cancer biologist at the Stanford University School of Medicine.

== Education ==
Sheltzer received a BA in molecular biology from Princeton University in 2008 and a PhD in biology from the Massachusetts Institute of Technology in 2015. His PhD research focused on the consequences of aneuploidy and was advised by Angelika Amon, a faculty member of MIT's Koch Institute for Integrative Cancer Research. Following his PhD, Sheltzer was an independent fellow at Cold Spring Harbor Laboratory from 2015 to 2021. In 2021, he joined the Yale University School of Medicine as an assistant professor of surgery and of genetics. In 2025, Sheltzer moved his lab to the Stanford University School of Medicine and became an assistant professor in the school's department of radiation oncology.

== Career and research ==
Sheltzer uses CRISPR/Cas9 technology to study aneuploidy and cancer genomics. Through the use of chromosome engineering, he has constructed cancer cells with different degrees of aneuploidy, and he has found how aneuploidy affects tumor development and metastasis. In 2019, he discovered a set of copy number alteration biomarkers that can be used to predict cancer patient outcomes. His research has questioned whether anti-cancer drugs could be acting through alternate mechanisms. He is a co-founder of Meliora Therapeutics.

Sheltzer also studies gender disparities in biology research. He found that some faculty members, such as Nobel Prize winners, tended to hire very few female students in their labs, which could contribute to the gender gap in STEM.

== Awards and honors ==
- Forbes Magazine, 30 under 30 in Science
- American Society for Cell Biology, Gilula Prize
- White House Office of Science and Technology, Presidential Early-Career Science and Engineering Award
