= Harry Harlan =

American botanist

Harry Vaughn Harlan (February 19, 1882 – November 6, 1944) was an American botanist, agronomist, and plant breeder who worked on barley at the US Department of Agriculture (USDA). He is notable for his international seed-collecting expeditions in search of barley cultivars for use the USDA's crop breeding programs.

== Early life ==
Born in London Mills, Illinois, H.V. Harlan was the son of Plato F. Harlan and Elizabeth Susan Phillippi. He came from a non-religious Quaker family.

== University study and career ==
In his own words, he entered the Kansas State College of Agriculture as the "crudest of country youths" and graduated in 1904. From 1904 to 1908, he worked in the Philippines organizing a school of agriculture. He then performed two years of graduate study at Kansas State College before being hired by Mark Carleton at the U.S. Department of Agriculture. At the USDA, he worked under Carleton and David Fairchild. He was assigned to work on barley, despite having no prior-experience with the crop.

== Barley collection ==
Harlan began his international work with the USDA in 1914, when he was sent to Peru to advise officials at the Southern Railroad of Peru (Ferrocarril del Sur) on agricultural matters. In Peru, he gathered high-altitude barley samples from around the town of Arequipa.

Nearing the end of World War I, The USDA sent Harlan to Europe in order to collect diverse barley to assist with breeding programs intended to bolster depleted food supplies in the post-war period. He collected barley in (modern day) England, France, Italy, Croatia, Serbia, Hungary, Romania, the Czech Republic, Austria, Germany, the Netherlands, Belgium, and Spain. He concluded that barleys in the Danube region had been largely untouched by modern plant breeding, and that they resembled barley as it had looked when it first came to the region thousands of years prior. Of barley cultivation in Eastern Europe, Harlan wrote: "What little we did see confirms the verdict of history and of our collections, namely that Europe never grew more than a limited number of type, and these had originated elsewhere."

In 1923, he collected plants in Asia, including India, Central Asia, China, and Japan.

In 1925, he traveled to Ethiopia and spent 59 days traveling through East and North Africa by mule caravan. He was likely the first English-speaker to visit many North African villages. He noted the extreme diversity of barley in these regions. He was particularly struck by the fact that some of the cultivars in Africa resembled those in Europe, indicating that they had probably originated in Africa or been brought from the Middle East to both Africa and Europe. He remarked that one cultivar of Egyptian barley resembled the grains found in ancient archaeobotanical samples in Egypt.

Back in the United States, Harlan and his collaborator Mary Martini used the diverse assembly of barley cultivars to build a composite cross population: an interbreeding population of genetically diverse plants which would evolve by natural selection. This population—a form of experimental evolution—has provided several insights in evolutionary biology and plant breeding.

== Personal life ==
He married Augusta Goodrich Griffing on November 15, 1905. They had two children, Wilbur Vaughn Harlan and Jack Rodney Harlan, who also became a distinguished botanist. H.V. Harlan was also a friend of the famous Russian plant scientist Nikolai Vavilov.
