= Mating design =

Mating design is a schematic cross between the groups or strains of plants are made in a plant breeding that is common in agriculture and biological science. The mating design in plant breeding has two main objectives: (1) to obtain information and understand the genetic control of a trait or behavior that is observed, and (2) to get the base population for the development of plant cultivars. Analysis of variance in offspring plants results from a mating design was used to evaluate the effects of additive genetic, dominant level, epistasis and heritability value equal to the value of genetic expectations.
