= Composite cross population =

A composite cross population (CCP) is created by crossing a number of plants from different lines, and subsequently bulking seeds from the resulting offspring. This makes a CCP a population of plants with a lot of inherent genetic diversity, in contrast to monocultures where all plants are clones and homozygous at all loci (fully inbred). In recent years CCPs have been proposed as a way to create modern landraces of wheat, barley and oats. Research is done to explore whether they are better suited for organic farming than the modern cultivars.

They are suited for participatory breeding of crops, which is in contrast to cultivars owned by big breeding companies.

The idea of using CCPs in plant breeding was published in 1956 based on the barley composite cross devised by Harry Harlan and Mary Martini in 1929. Yield data for 4 different populations for 8–28 years were presented in the article and after 8–15 years of repeated breeding under natural selection, the populations out-yielded the reference cultivar.

== Stages ==
Creating a CCP involves three steps: initiation, multiplication and mixture. The population then goes into the maintenance phase.

=== Initiation ===
A number of lines, generally 7-30, with interesting properties, such as yield or baking quality, are selected and all possible crosses of them are done. If many lines of different genetic background are used, a huge amount of genetic diversity will be present.

=== Multiplication ===
Seeds from crosses are sown out and harvested separately for a growing season or two until enough seeds are available.

=== Mixture ===
All seeds are mixed in equal portions to produce the first CCP generation.

=== Maintenance ===
The population is grown repeatedly and possibly changes due to natural selection. Each year seeds are saved after harvest, and used as seed for the next growing season. Plants that are successful under the prevailing growing conditions will give more seeds and contribute more to the next generation, compared to less successful plants. Disease will cull susceptible plants and the population will over time become resistant to the common diseases, but only if the initial population has resistance genes present.

=== Selection by human intervention ===
Negative mass selection, which is removal of plants/seeds with unwanted properties, can be done when preparing seed for planting, at field visits during the growing season and at harvest. Removing unhealthy/deceased plants from the field is a simple way to improve the population. Before planting it is normal procedure to clean the seed to remove seeds from weeds and this will also remove small seeds, introducing a weak selection towards bigger kernels. Seed can also be sorted according to color or protein content.

== Pros ==
When genotypes grown together in a diverse population have different profiles of resource use they complement each other in the exploitation of the limiting resource and therefore are subject to smaller between-plant competition.

In case of disease or environmental change some plants will take over when others fail. Yield stability over years and environments can be better than pure lines due to compensation.

Participatory plant breeding (PPB) methods represent alternatives aimed to improve local adaptation breeding, to promote genetic diversity, to empower farmers and rural communities. In PPB farmers are actively participating in developing new cultivars or populations, e.g. by performing selection.

== Cons ==
Different genotypes may compete with each other in a way that is not beneficial for the population. A pure line optimized for a certain environment or usage outperforms the CCP under these specific conditions.

There is no reason to believe that the Darwinian selection will work in the desired direction for traits such as baking quality. Natural selection and in-field human selection act on the plant stage, not the seed stage.

Common Bunt is a seed borne disease in wheat. In conventional farming it is controlled by fungicide treatment of seeds. In organic farming seeds can be cleaned by brushing before sowing, but it is also desirable that plants have genetic resistance. A CCP, including crosses of resistant cultivars, was grown with heavy common bunt infection for 5 years and it appeared to get more resistant, but the common bunt's virulence appeared to change at least as fast. The overall result was that infection levels went up.

== Genetic resource ==
CCPs can be a valuable resource of genetic material. They can be used to preserve valuable genetic diversity for future use, or as base for new breeding programs. Promising plants can be selected and multiplied, generating new varieties.

== EU seed law ==
It is legal under EU law to sell and buy seeds from a composite cross population as an experiment in the period between 2014 and 2018.

=== ORC Wakelyns Population ===
In 2000, with the help of plant breeders and the Organic Research Centre, the scientist Martin Wolfe crossed 20 varieties of wheat (selected for quality and yield) and crossed them to obtain 190 new crosses. These seeds were not further selected and planted, grown, harvested and reseeded together as a population.

Martin Wolfe called it YQ, for "yield" and "quality". Wolfe lobbied in Brussels and Westminster to receive an exception to the EU regulations that would allow YQ to be sold. In 2014, it was accepted and since 2017 the YQ seed, officially called the "ORC Wakelyns Population" was the first population wheat to go on sale in Europe.
