= Pollinator exclusion experiment =

Pollinator exclusion experiments are experiments used by ecologists to determine the effectiveness of putative plant pollination vectors. Essentially, certain pollinators are prevented from visiting certain flowers, and observations are then made on which flowers develop seeds. If the exclusion of a certain class of visitor prevents or greatly reduces flower fertilisation rates, then it can be concluded that that class of visitor plays an important role in pollination.

There are various methods for excluding pollinators. A cage may exclude nectarivorous birds and mammals but allow access by insects, while a net may exclude all but the smallest animals, yet permit wind-pollination and minimise effects of microclimate. Insect repellent may prevent visits by insects whilst allowing access by birds and mammals. Bags may be used to prevent all but autogamous pollination. Bagging flowers only during the day or night makes it possible to exclude diurnal or nocturnal visitors respectively.
