= Pollination bag =

Pollination control device

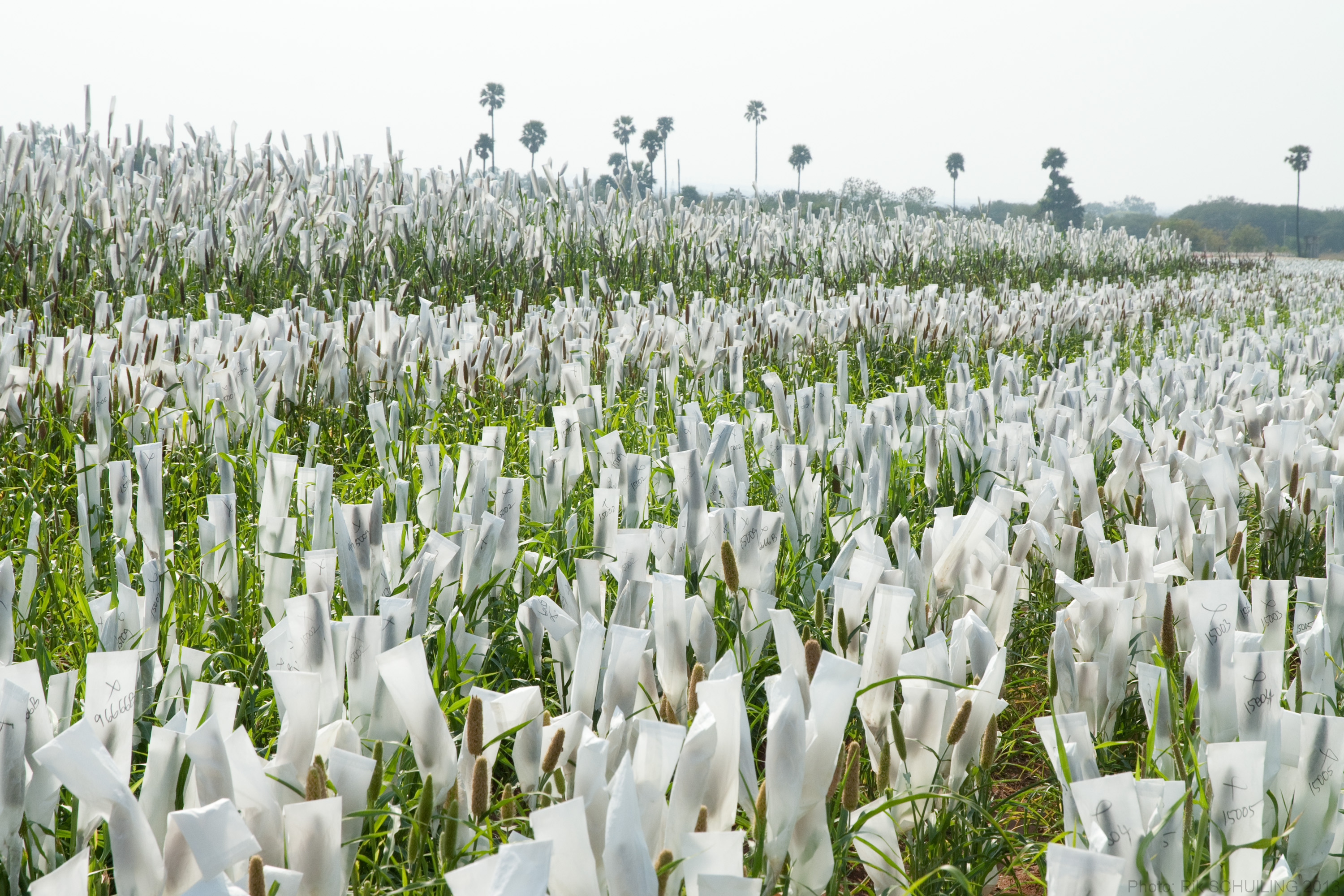
Pearl millet seed production plots at ICRISAT (Patancheru, Hyderabad (AP), India), the panicles covered in parchment paper bags to ensure self-pollination.

Pollination bags, sometimes called crossing bags, isolation bags or exclusion bags, are containers made of various different materials for the purpose of controlling pollination for plants.

== Characteristics of pollination bags ==
Pollination bags are designed to fit well over the inflorescence or individual flowers of a plant type. The size, shape and strength of bag should ensure that there is no contact with flowers to avoid development of diseases and physical hindrances in seed development. The size of bag will vary with the size of inflorescence to be covered. Pollination bags may be 2D or 3D. The 3D bags have a gusset for expansion to avoid contact between the plant and the bag. Sometimes pollination bags may have a window to allow examination of inflorescence without removing the bag. Bags with a flap over the window, when provided, protects from strong sunlight.

Most pollination bags are produced by general paper bag manufacturers which have branched out into providing pollination bag supplies. Such bags may not suit to the needs of plant breeders of different crops. Some companies such as PBS International UK, Del Star (Delnet) Technologies (Delnet bags), AKCRON Technologies(DL, India) and Focus Packaging manufacture customized bags of different qualities for individual needs. Modifications in bags have been made that allow pollen collection without opening the bag in order minimise contamination. These bags have provision on one side that allows attachment of a plastic tube in which pollen can be collected after shaking the bag. Bags for female flowers sometimes have nozzles for introducing the pollen without any need for them to open.

Plant breeders have often faced a problem of opening of bags at the seams. Glued seams do not hold long under variable weather conditions frequented with rains. Pollination tents are also used for controlled pollination.

== Design of pollination bags ==
Good pollination bags are those which have most of the following properties:

- Enough strength against abrasions and tearing by wind, rain storms and birds in the open field or water spray in the glasshouse.
- Highly effective barrier to pollen grains with pores smaller than the size of pollen.
- Allow sunlight penetration for continuation of photosynthetic activity within the bag. However, the material should be UV stable.
- Moisture and air should be able to pass through the bag. There should be enough aeration that should not let temperature rise drastically.
- Rainwater should not collect in the bag and rain should not deteriorate the quality of bag. The bag should dry out quickly after the rain.
- Fungal disease should not develop within the bag. This will result from the combined effect of ambient conditions for moisture, aeration and temperature maintenance in the bag.
- A good bag should allow ambient micro-environment within it for the development of strong and healthy seeds that will reflect in higher yield and seed viability for healthy seedlings that will ensure early establishment in the field.
- The bags should be foldable and flexible for easy transport and management during operations.

=== Types of pollination bags ===
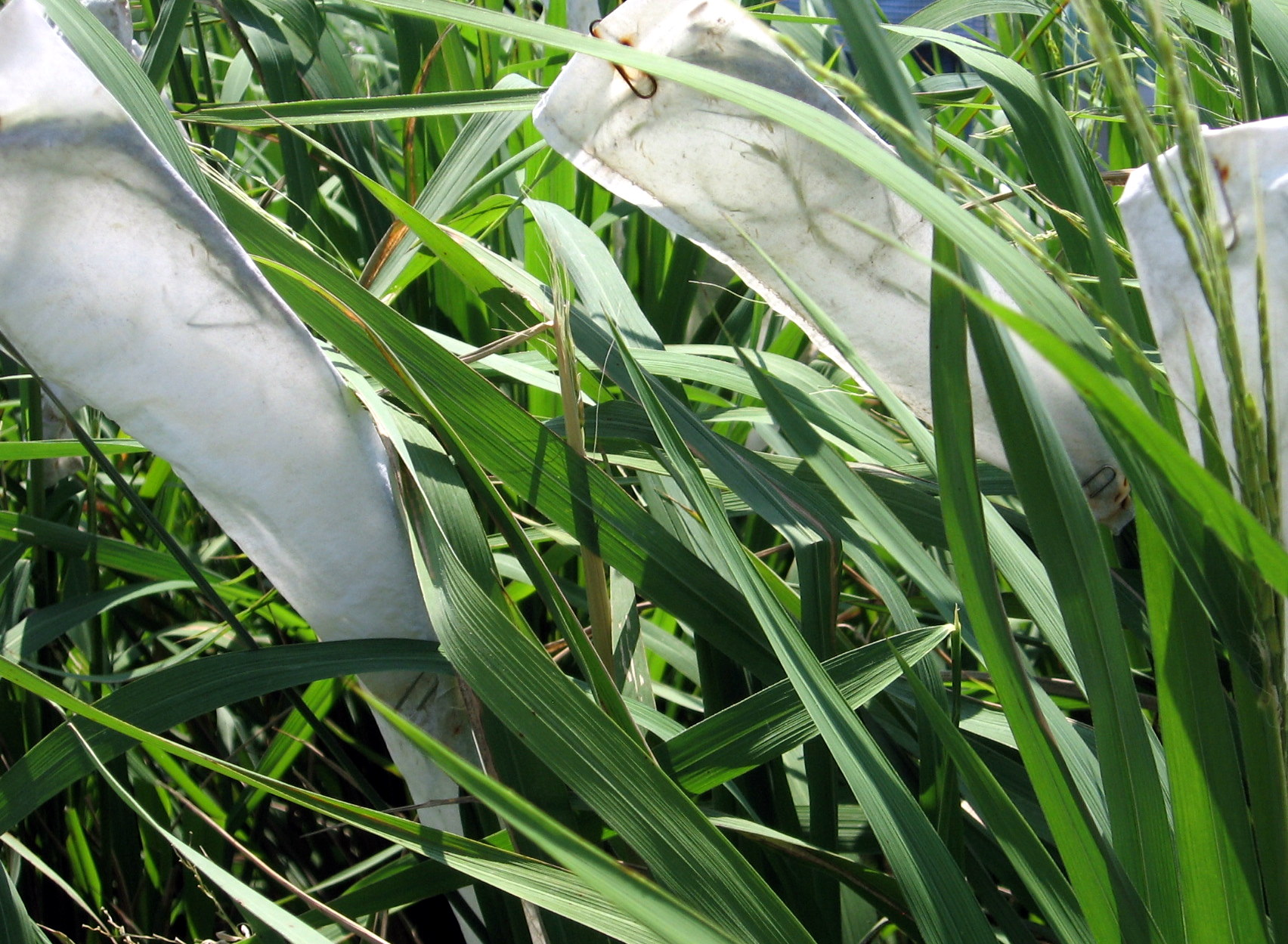
Bagged rice panicles in paper bags

- Kraft paper: Pollination bags used in Sorghum and maize are made from strong Kraft paper. These bags multi-layered strong brown paper but can be damaged by rains and birds to some extent.
- Canvas: They are made of natural cotton fibre bags which are strong but attract moisture in rains. They also attract bacteria due to high cellulose content. However, they are breathable and washable.
- Glassine: They are made of glazed paper and also called butter paper bags. They are water repellent types but can be damaged by high winds and birds. These are used in wheat and barley. Focus Packaging produces this sort of bags.
- Plastic/polyethylene: Generically it includes many type of materials. It may have transparent hard plastic or bread type soft bags. Polyethylene nylon type when flash spun is strong and used as protective clothing. Non-woven from hybrid process is also produced. These bags degenerate in light and air does not pass through them but water is repelled.

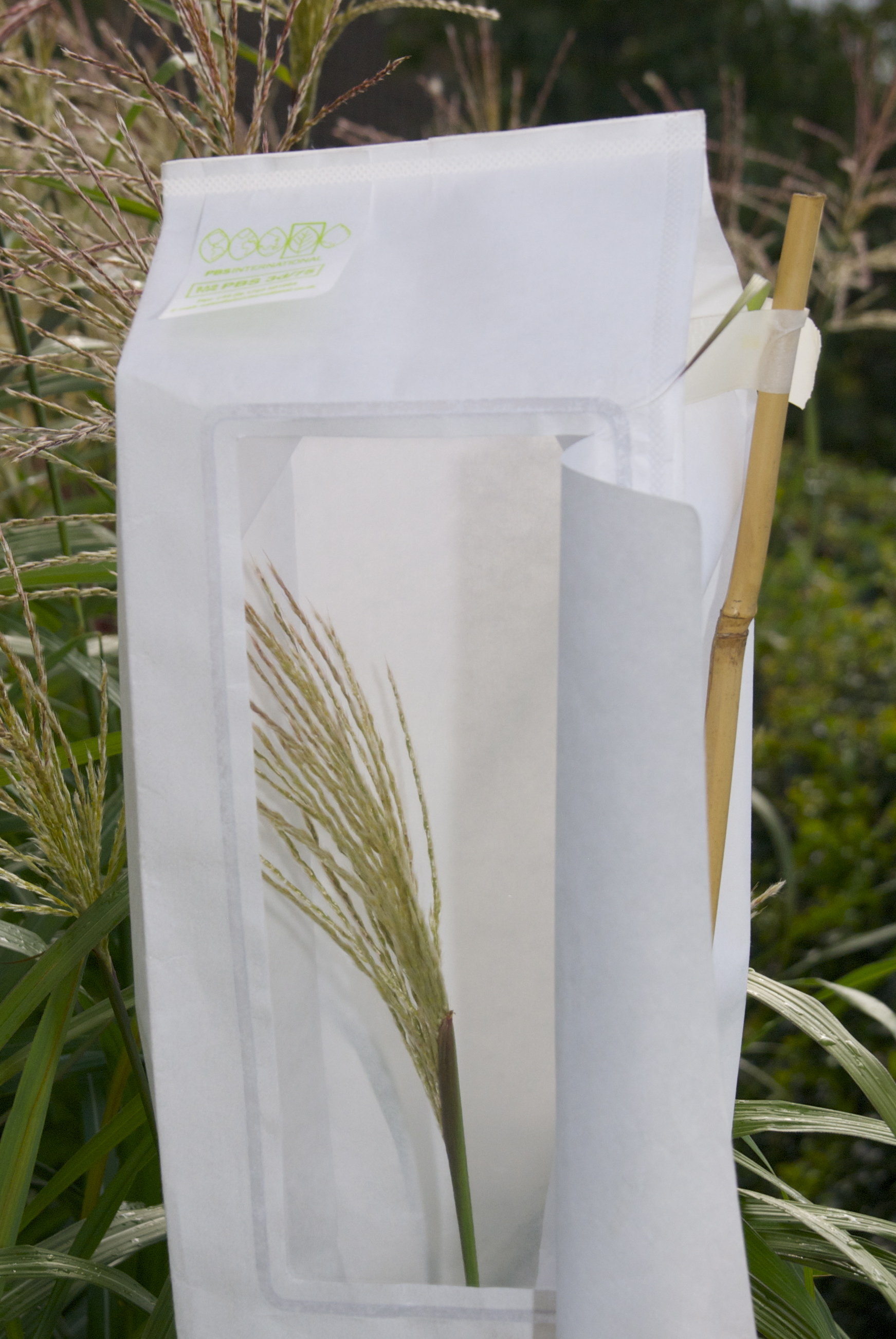
Miscanthus in a non-woven polyester pollination bag from PBS International

- Polyester: Non-woven polyester pollination bags are often used in plant breeding programmes associated with forestry, fruit breeding and some wind pollinated crops. They are also used where durability is critical. PBS International specialises in these product types.
- Tyvek: Dupont Company produces non-woven polyethylene which can be converted into bag. This cloth is used as a damp proofing membrane, envelopes and protective clothing amongst other things. These types of bags are strong but not as breathable as others.
- Micro-mesh or micro-perforated fabric: Polypropylene non-woven melted and pressed materials which is breathable and water resistant. These bags have micro-perforations to allow the plant to breathe and are available in varying sizes and hole patterns. The pore size may vary according to the density of the pressed fibres. Usually the perforated rough side is outside so as not to damage the plants. These bags are used in forestry and grasses.
- Organza Sachets: often found in a party supply store or section are a cheap alternative used by home gardeners.

Plant breeders have been using pollination bags made of a wide range of materials such as: brown paper (Pickering, 1977); glassine (Foster, 1968; Tsangarakis and Fleming, 1968), polythene (Tsangarakis and Fleming, 1968; Smith and Mehlenbacher, 1994) ), plastic (Schertz and Clark, 1967; Smith and Mehlenbacher, 1994), butter paper (Dahiya and Jatsara, 1979), cellophane (Jensen, 1976; Subrahmanyam, 1977), paraffin paper (Shigenobu and Sakamoto, 1977), pergamyn or parchment (Jensen, 1976; Hall, 1954), plastic (Cooper et al., 1978; Krus, 1974), polythene (Keller, 1945; Martin and Chapman, 1977), polyester (McAdam, et al., 1987; Hata et al., 1995). Alternative materials which have been reported to have beneficial effect on seed production, include terylene (Foster, 1968) and Kraft paper bags (Wells, 1962; Smith and Mehlenbacher, 1994)). Others (Smith and Mehlenbacher, 1994;) have used paper bags and variation of spun polyethylene bags which are made from spun-bond polyethylene fibre sheet designed and marketed as a vapour barrier for residential building construction (Tyvek Home- wrap, DuPont Corp., Wilmington DE); fabric bags of polyester, cotton muslin and nylon fabrics (Neal and Anderson, 2004); and polyester micromesh fabric (Nel and J van Staden, 2013; Vogel et al., 2014).

== Patents ==
A patent for the design of pollination bags for hybridisation in corn in the US was granted to Tell and Des Moines in 1985. The design allows expansion of bags to remain on the shoot during high winds and let the shoot grow within it. The cover is transparent to enable workers to observe developmental stages. The cover material is vapour permeable to prevent unwanted condensation from destroying transparency and to discourage the growth of mildew, fungus and bacteria. However, bags have been patented for protecting the fruit, vegetables and small plants by Kollath and Huffman (2000). These bags are made of perforated materials passing sunlight, water and air but having perforations sufficiently small to exclude insects. Guthrie (1988) patented bag for processing fruit or vegetables especially the apple fruit.

== See also ==
- Pollination
- Cheating (biology)
- Domestication
- Fruit tree pollination
- Hand pollination
- Paul Knuth
- Hermann Müller (botanist)
- Plant reproductive morphology
- Pollination syndrome
- Pollinators
- Self-pollination
