= Plant breeding in Nepal =

Plant breeding in Nepal is the art and science of improving the heredity of plants for benefit of humanity in Nepal. The major crops of Nepal include rice, wheat, maize, oil seeds and grain legumes.

== National Organizations ==
Crop breeding history in Nepal started long before the establishment of research stations around the country and establishment of Institute of Agriculture and Animal Science, Rampur, Chitwan under Tribhuvan University. Later as a research governmental organization, Nepal Agricultural Research Council (NARC) was established in 1991 as an autonomous organization under "Nepal Agricultural Research Council Act - 1991" to conduct agricultural research in the country to uplift the economic level of the people.

== Ministry of Agriculture and Cooperatives ==
The Ministry of Agriculture and Cooperatives is major responsible organization for agricultural development in Nepal. This consists of five divisions, two centers, one research and development council, four departments, four projects and autonomous bodies of one research council (Nepal Agriculture Research Council), four corporations and a few development committees and boards. In and under the Ministry of Agriculture and Cooperatives there are more than 10,000 employees.

Under NARC following crop research station perform crop improvement activities in Nepal.

1. National Rice Research Program
2. National Wheat Research Program
3. National Maize Research Program
4. National Grain Legumes Research Program
5. National Oilseeds Research Program
6. National Sugarcane Research Program
7. National Citrus Research Program
8. National Potato Research Program
9. National Jute Research Program #National Ginger Research Program
10. Hill Crops Research Program

== Department of Plant Breeding, Institute of Agriculture and Animal Science ==
Under Tribhuvan University system, IAAS Paklihawa and Lamjung and Under Agriculture and Forestry University in Rampur, Chitwan have also research on breeding major crops including rice, wheat, maize and grain legumes. A well equipped biotechnology laboratory for crop improvement is located at the Institute. Major coordinating department for plant breeding research is department of plant breeding in coordination with department of plant pathology, entomology, horticulture and agronomy.

== National Rice Research Program ==
National Rice Research Program (NRRP) is located at Hardinath, Dhanusa. This was located at Parwanipur, Bara.

== National Wheat Research Program ==
National Wheat Research Program (NWRP) was established in 1972 at Khumaltar, Lalitpur under the name of National Wheat Development Program. In 1975, it was transferred to Bhairahawa Agricultural Farm, which was established in 1960. Geographically, the station is located at 105 meters above sea level and 27°32’ north latitude and 83°25’ east longitude. It is 300 km west of capital city Kathamandu and 21 km east of Lumbini, the birthplace of Buddha.

The climate at NWRP is subtropical. The recorded maximum temperature in summer is 44.6 °C and minimum temperature in winter is 4.8 °C. The average annual rain fall is 1700 mm, with maximum and minimum mean temperature of June and January is 30.8 0C and 14.7 0C respectively. NWRP station has a total of 35 hectares of land area out of which 25 hectares are utilized for wheat research and production activities and rest 10 hectares are occupied by farm roads drainage, office and residence facilities.

Wheat is the third largest cereal crop in Nepal after rice and maize. Before the introduction of Mexican semi-dwarf wheat varieties, wheat cultivation in Nepal was limited to mid and far-western hills only and it was considered as a minor cereal in the country. After the introduction of semi-dwarf varieties from Mexico, the area and production of wheat in Nepal has been increased dramatically and now it has significant contribution to the national food supply. In 1965/66, wheat area in the country was 100,000 ha and the production was 112,000 metric tons. In 2006/07, its area and production have increased to 702664 ha and 1515139 metric tons respectively. The present national average wheat productivity is 2156 kg/ha. Wheat is cultivated in 20 percent of the total cultivated land area and contributes 18.8 percent to the total national cereal production. Per capita wheat consumption has increased from 17.4 kg in 1972 at the time of NWRP establishment to 60 kg in 2007. In Terai, as irrigation facility is steadily increasing there is still ample opportunity to expand the wheat area where the lands remain fallow after rice harvesting.

National Wheat Research Program located at Bhairahawa

== National Oilseed Research Program ==
National Oilseed Development Program was established on April 14, 1976 (Baishakh 02, 2033 BS) for the research and development of the oilseeds in the country. After the inception of Nepal Agricultural Research Council in 1990 (2048 BS) it was renamed as National Oilseed Research Program (NORP). This program is situated in Nawalpur in Sarlahi District. Oilseed research in Nepal was started systematically with the establishment this program. NORP is located at Netragunj Village Development Committee in ward no. 6, Nawalpur. It is located on east west national highway. It lies at 27° 3' 86" north latitude and 85° 35' 52" east longitude and at an elevation of 144 masl.

== National Agricultural Research and Development Fund ==
In general, National Agricultural Research and Development Fund (NARDF) is Responsible to carry out the applied researches. It was established in December 2001 under the Working Fund Act, 1986. it has targeted to support the Government, non-government, educational, private sector, civil society, cooperatives and community-based organizations to conduct agricultural research and development works. NARDF has been supporting crop improvement projects in addition to other agricultural research projects.

== International Collaboration ==
CIMMYT international and the IRRI has been collaborating actively with NARC and IAAS in wheat and rice improvement programs.
