= Chromosome engineering =

Chromosome engineering is "the controlled generation of chromosomal deletions, inversions, or translocations with defined endpoints." By combining chromosomal translocation, chromosomal inversion, and chromosomal deletion, chromosome engineering has been shown to identify the underlying genes that cause certain diseases in mice. In coming years, it is very likely that chromosomal engineering will be able to do the same identification for diseases in humans, as well as all other organisms.

== The Three Types of Chromosome Engineering ==
chromosomal deletion	chromosomal inversion	chromosomal translocation
Chromosomal deletion is a mutation (a genetic aberration) in which a part of a chromosome or a sequence of DNA is missing.	Chromosomal inversion is a chromosome rearrangement in which a segment of a chromosome is reversed end to end.	Chromosomal translocation is a chromosome abnormality caused by rearrangement of parts between nonhomologous chromosomes.

== Experiments of Chromosome Engineering ==
In an experiment pertaining to chromosome engineering that was conducted in 2006, it was found that chromosome engineering can be effectively used as a method of identifying the causes of genetic disorders such as the continuous gene and aneuploidy syndromes. The experiment was conducted by infecting mice with the human disease, ES, to see the effectiveness of chromosomal engineering in the gene identification of those diseases. After much experimenting, it was found that manipulating chromosomes, or chromosome engineering, is an excellent and efficient method of determining underlying genes in genetic orders and diseases.

In the future, chromosome engineering will experiment in removing more common disorders such as asthma, diabetes, and cancer. If it can be recognized by the medical community as effective and safe, it should be able to be used regularly in the near future.

== See also ==
- Genetics
- Chromosome
- Chromosomal deletion
- Chromosomal inversion
- Chromosomal translocation
- DNA
- Disease
